= Brad Mehldau discography =

Brad Mehldau is an American jazz pianist. He first recorded in 1991, for saxophonist Christopher Hollyday's The Natural Moment. Mehldau has recorded more than forty albums as leader or co-leader, many more as a sideman, and for several soundtracks.

== Discography ==
An asterisk (*) after the year indicates that it is the year of release.

=== As leader/co-leader ===
Mehldau plays piano on all albums, unless otherwise indicated.

| Year recorded | Title | Label | Notes |
|---|---|---|---|
| 1993 | New York-Barcelona Crossing, Volumen 1 | Fresh Sound | Quartet, co-led with Perico Sambeat (alto sax), Mario Rossy (bass), Jorge Rossy (drums); in concert |
| 1993 | New York-Barcelona Crossing, Volumen 2 | Fresh Sound | Quartet, co-led with Perico Sambeat (alto sax), Mario Rossy (bass), Jorge Rossy (drums); in concert |
| 1993 | When I Fall in Love | Fresh Sound | Trio, as "Mehldau & Rossy Trio", with Mario Rossy (bass), Jorge Rossy (drums); in concert |
| 1994 | Consenting Adults | Criss Cross | Quintet, as "MTB", with Mark Turner (tenor sax), Peter Bernstein (guitar), Larry Grenadier (bass), Leon Parker (drums); released 2000 |
| 1995 | Introducing Brad Mehldau | Warner Bros. | Trio, with Larry Grenadier (bass), Jorge Rossy (drums) on most tracks; Christian McBride (bass), Brian Blade (drums) on some |
| 1996 | The Art of the Trio Volume One | Warner Bros. | Trio, with Larry Grenadier (bass), Jorge Rossy (drums) |
| 1996 | Marian McPartland's Piano Jazz | Jazz Alliance | Solo piano; duo with Marian McPartland (piano); conversation; radio broadcast, released on CD in 2007 |
| 1997 | Live at the Village Vanguard: The Art of the Trio Volume Two | Warner Bros. | Trio, with Larry Grenadier (bass), Jorge Rossy (drums); in concert |
| 1998 | Songs: The Art of the Trio Volume Three | Warner Bros. | Trio, with Larry Grenadier (bass), Jorge Rossy (drums) |
| 1999 | Elegiac Cycle | Warner Bros. | Solo piano |
| 1999 | Art of the Trio 4: Back at the Vanguard | Warner Bros. | Trio, with Larry Grenadier (bass), Jorge Rossy (drums); in concert |
| 2000 | Places | Warner Bros. | Some solo piano; some trio, with Larry Grenadier (bass), Jorge Rossy (drums) |
| 2000 | Progression: The Art of the Trio, Vol. 5 | Warner Bros. | Trio, with Larry Grenadier (bass), Jorge Rossy (drums); in concert |
| 2002 | Largo | Warner Bros. | With Larry Grenadier, Justin Meldal-Johnsen, Darek Oleszkiewicz (bass), Matt Chamberlain, Jim Keltner, Jorge Rossy (drums), Victor Indrizzo (drums, percussion), Jon Brion (guitar, guitar synth, piano percussion), various others (horn instruments); Mehldau also plays vibraphone |
| 2002 | Anything Goes | Warner Bros. | Trio, with Larry Grenadier (bass), Jorge Rossy (drums) |
| 2003 | Live in Tokyo | Nonesuch | Solo piano; in concert |
| 2002–05 | House on Hill | Nonesuch | Trio, with Larry Grenadier (bass), Jorge Rossy (drums) |
| 2005 | Day Is Done | Nonesuch | Trio, with Larry Grenadier (bass), Jeff Ballard (drums) |
| 2005 | Metheny Mehldau | Nonesuch | Duo, co-led with Pat Metheny (guitars, guitar synth); some quartet tracks, with Larry Grenadier (bass), Jeff Ballard (drums) added |
| 2005 | Metheny Mehldau Quartet | Nonesuch | Quartet, co-led with Pat Metheny (guitars, guitar synth), Larry Grenadier (bass), Jeff Ballard (drums); some duo tracks, with Metheny |
| 2006 | Brad Mehldau Trio Live | Nonesuch | Trio, with Larry Grenadier (bass), Jeff Ballard (drums) |
| 2006 | Love Sublime | Nonesuch | Duo, co-led with Renée Fleming (vocals) |
| 2006 | Live in Marciac | Nonesuch | Solo piano, in concert |
| 2007 | Long Ago and Far Away | Impulse! | Duo, co-led with Charlie Haden (bass); in concert; released 2018 |
| 2009 | Highway Rider | Nonesuch | With Joshua Redman (soprano sax, tenor sax), Larry Grenadier (bass), Jeff Ballard (drums, percussion), Matt Chamberlain (drums), The Fleurettes (vocals), orchestra; Mehldau also plays various other instruments |
| 2010 | Love Songs | Naïve | Duo, co-led with Anne Sofie von Otter (vocals) |
| 2010 | Modern Music | Nonesuch | Duo, co-led with Kevin Hays (piano) |
| 2008–11 | Ode | Nonesuch | Trio, with Larry Grenadier (bass), Jeff Ballard (drums) |
| 2008–11 | Where Do You Start | Nonesuch | Trio, with Larry Grenadier (bass), Jeff Ballard (drums) |
| 2011 | Nearness | Nonesuch | Duo, with Joshua Redman (saxophones) |
| 2013 | Variations on a Melancholy Theme | Nonesuch | With Orpheus Chamber Orchestra; released 2021 |
| 2014* | Mehliana: Taming the Dragon | Nonesuch | Duo, as "Mehliana", co-led with Mark Guiliana (drums, electronics); Mehldau also plays synthesizers, Fender Rhodes |
| 2004–14 | 10 Years Solo Live | Nonesuch | Solo piano; in concert |
| 2012–14 | Blues and Ballads | Nonesuch | Trio, with Larry Grenadier (bass), Jeff Ballard (drums) |
| 2012–14 | Seymour Reads the Constitution! | Nonesuch | Trio, with Larry Grenadier (bass), Jeff Ballard (drums) |
| 2015–16 | Chris Thile & Brad Mehldau | Nonesuch | Duo, with Chris Thile (mandolin, vocals) |
| 2017 | After Bach | Nonesuch | Solo piano |
| 2017–18 | Finding Gabriel | Nonesuch | With Ambrose Akinmusire (trumpet), Chris Cheek (baritone sax, tenor sax), Charles Pillow (baritone sax, alto sax, soprano sax, bass clarinet), Joel Frahm (tenor sax), Michael Thomas (alto sax, flute), Sara Caswell (violin), Lois Martin (viola), Noah Hoffeld (cello), Mark Guiliana (drums), Aaron Nevezie (effects), Kurt Elling, Gabriel Kahane, "Snorts" Malibu and Becca Stevens (vocals) |
| 2020 | Suite: April 2020 | Nonesuch | Solo piano |
| 2020 | Your Mother Should Know: Brad Mehldau Plays The Beatles | Nonesuch | Solo piano; in concert |
| 2020–21 | Jacob's Ladder | Nonesuch | With various; Mehldau plays multiple instruments |
| 2022 | The Folly of Desire | Pentatone | Duo, with Ian Bostridge (vocals) |
| 2017–23 | After Bach II | Nonesuch | Solo piano |
| 2023 | Après Fauré | Nonesuch | Solo piano |
| 2023 | Solid Jackson | Criss Cross | Quintet, as "MTB", with Mark Turner (tenor sax), Peter Bernstein (guitar), Larry Grenadier (bass), Bill Stewart (drums) |
| 2025 | Ride into the Sun | Nonesuch | With John Davis (bass), Matt Chamberlain (drums, percussion), Daniel Rossen (guitar, vocals), Chris Thile (mandolin, vocals), Felix Moseholm (bass), orchestra |

Promotional album (not for sale): Deregulating Jazz (trio, with Larry Grenadier (bass), Jorge Rossy (drums)) (Warner Bros., released 2000)

Compilation with other tracks by Eliane Elias, Dave Grusin, Herbie Hancock, and Bob James: Portrait of Bill Evans (JVC, around 2002)

Compilation containing some additional material: The Art of the Trio: Recordings 1996–2001 (Nonesuch)

=== As sideman ===
| Year recorded | Leader | Title | Label |
|---|---|---|---|
| 1991 | Christopher Hollyday | The Natural Moment | Novus |
| 1992 | Peter Bernstein | Somethin's Burnin' | Criss Cross |
| 1992 | Allen Mezquida | A Good Thing | Koch Jazz |
| 1992 | Grant Stewart | Downtown Sounds | Criss Cross |
| 1993 | Jesse Davis | Young at Art | Concord |
| 1994 | Peter Bernstein | Signs of Life | Criss Cross |
| 1994 | Joshua Redman | Moodswing | Warner Bros. |
| 1994 | Mark Turner | Yam Yam | Criss Cross |
| 1995 | Perico Sambeat | Ademuz | Fresh Sound |
| 1996 | Chris Potter | Moving In | Concord |
| 1996 | Lee Konitz | Alone Together | Blue Note |
| 1997 | Anthony Wilson | Anthony Wilson | MAMA |
| 1997 | Lee Konitz | Another Shade of Blue | Blue Note |
| 1997 | Avishai Cohen | Adama | Stretch |
| 1998* | Willie Nelson | Teatro | Island |
| 1998* | Joshua Redman | Timeless Tales (For Changing Times) | Warner Bros. |
| 1998 | Mark Turner | In This World | Warner Bros. |
| 1998* | Scott Weiland | 12 Bar Blues | Atlantic |
| 1999 | Ruth Cameron | Roadhouse | Verve |
| 1999 | Chris Cheek | Vine | Fresh Sound |
| 1999 | Fleurine | Close Enough for Love | EmArcy |
| 1999 | Charles Lloyd | The Water Is Wide | ECM |
| 1999 | Charles Lloyd | Hyperion with Higgins | ECM |
| 2000 | Steve Davis | Portrait in Sound | Stretch |
| 2000 | John Scofield | Works for Me | Verve |
| 2001* | Lea DeLaria | Play It Cool | Warner Bros. |
| 2001 | Joe Henry | Scar | Mammoth |
| 2001 | John Patitucci | Communion | Concord |
| 2001 | Walt Weiskopf | Man of Many Colors | Criss Cross |
| 2001 | Joel Frahm | Don't Explain | Palmetto |
| 2002* | Vinicius Cantuária | Vinicius | Transparent Music |
| 2002 | Peter Bernstein | Heart's Content | Criss Cross |
| 2002 | Charlie Haden | American Dreams | Verve |
| 2003* | Fleurine | Fire | Coast to Coast |
| 2003 | Perico Sambeat | Friendship | ACT |
| 2003* | Wayne Shorter | Alegría | Verve |
| 2003 | Peter Bernstein | Stranger in Paradise | Venus |
| 2004* | Harvey Mason | With All My Heart | Bluebird |
| 2004* | Darek Oleszkiewicz | Like a Dream | Cryptogramophone |
| 2005* | Daniel Lanois | Belladonna | ANTI- |
| 2005* | Kurt Rosenwinkel | Deep Song | Verve |
| 2005 | Chris Cheek | Blues Cruise | Fresh Sound |
| 2005 | Fleurine | San Francisco | Sunnyside |
| 2006 | Michael Brecker | Pilgrimage | Telarc |
| 2007 | Vinicius Cantuária | Cymbals | Naïve |
| 2008 | Allen Toussaint | The Bright Mississippi | Nonesuch |
| 2009 | Lee Konitz | Live at Birdland | ECM |
| 2009 | Joe Martin | Not by Chance | Anzic |
| 2009 | Eli Degibri | Israeli Song | Anzic |
| 2009 | Vinicius Cantuária | Samba Carioca | Naïve |
| 2009* | Robert Sadin | Art of Love: Music of Machaut | Deutsche Grammophon |
| 2012 | Joshua Redman | Walking Shadows | Nonesuch |
| 2012 | Petra Haden | Petra Goes to the Movies | ANTI- |
| 2013 | Antonio Sánchez | Three Times Three | CAM Jazz |
| 2014* | Jimmy Cobb | The Original Mob | Smoke Sessions |
| 2014* | Renée Fleming | Christmas in New York | Decca |
| 2014* | Dayna Stephens | Peace | Sunnyside |
| 2016* | Warren Wolf | Convergence | Mack Avenue |
| 2016 | Wolfgang Muthspiel | Rising Grace | ECM |
| 2017* | Dayna Stephens | Gratitude | Contagious Music |
| 2017* | Peter Bernstein | Signs Live! | Smoke Sessions |
| 2018* | Fleurine | Brazilian Dream | Sunnyside |
| 2018 | Wolfgang Muthspiel | Where the River Goes | ECM |
| 2019* | Kyle Crane | Crane Like the Bird | Crane Like the Bird |
| 2019* | Pedro Martins | Vox | Heartcore |
| 2019* | Chase Baird | A Life Between | Soundsabound |
| 2007–2019 | Joshua Redman | LongGone | Nonesuch |
| 2019 | Joshua Redman | RoundAgain | Nonesuch |
| 2022 | Chris Potter | Eagle's Point | Edition |
| 2024 | Peter Bernstein | Better Angels | Smoke Sessions |

=== Soundtracks ===
- Vanya on 42nd Street (1994)
- Midnight in the Garden of Good and Evil (1997)
- Eyes Wide Shut (1999)
- Space Cowboys (2000)
- The Million Dollar Hotel (2000)
- Ma femme est une actrice (2001)
- Ils se marièrent et eurent beaucoup d'enfants (2004)
- Mon chien stupide (2019)
