= Rossy (disambiguation) =

Rossy is a Canadian chain of discount stores.

It may also refer to:

- Rossy (musician), musician from Madagascar
- Rossy Aguirre, Mexican actress
- Rossy Barbour, Canadian politician
- Rossy de Palma, Spanish actress
- Rossy Pratiwi Dipoyanti, Indonesian table tennis player
- Rossy Evelin Lima, Mexican poet
- Rossy Mendoza, Mexican actress
- Rossy Moreno, Mexican wrestler
- Rossy Noprihanis, Indonesian footballer
- Derric Rossy, American boxer
- Jorge Rossy, Spanish musician
- Mario Rossy, Spanish musician
- Mercedes Rossy, Spanish musician
- Rico Rossy, American baseball player
- Thomas de Rossy, Scottish clergyman
- Thomas de Rossy (bishop of the Isles), Scottish clergyman
- Yves Rossy, Swiss jet pack pilot
