= When I Fall in Love (disambiguation) =

"When I Fall in Love" is a 1952 song, written by Victor Young and Edward Heyman, recorded by many artists.

When I Fall in Love may also refer to:

== In music ==
- When I Fall in Love, an album by The Lettermen, 1989
- When I Fall in Love (Brad Mehldau album), 1993
- When I Fall in Love (Ant & Dec song), 1996
- When I Fall in Love (Sacha Distel album), 2003
- When I Fall in Love (Chris Botti album), 2004
- "When I Fall in Love" [Albert Felden] 2:41 (Sam Cooke's Encore, 1958)
- "When I Fall in Love", a song by The Featherz, recorded 2012, released on their 2017 album Five-Year-Itch

== In literature ==
- When I Fall in Love, a 1999 novel by Iris Rainer Dart
- When I Fall in Love, a 2007 novel by Lynn Kurland

== See also ==
- When I Fall in Love... with Both, a 2000 Hong Kong film
