= New York-Barcelona Crossing, Volumen 1 =

Live album by Brad Mehldau
- Released: 1993
- Recorded: May 10, 1993
- Venue: Jamboree Club, Barcelona
- Genre: Jazz
- Length: 1:12:09
- Label: Fresh Sound New Talent
- Producer: Jordi Pujol, Jordi Rossy

Brad Mehldau chronology
New York-Barcelona Crossing, Volumen 1 (1993)	New York-Barcelona Crossing, Volumen 2 (1993)

New York-Barcelona Crossing, Volumen 1 is an album by jazz pianist Brad Mehldau, with Perico Sambeat (alto sax), Mario Rossy (bass) and Jorge Rossy (drums).

== Music and recording ==
The album was recorded in concert at the Jamboree Club in Barcelona on May 10, 1993. The material is mostly jazz standards and pieces from the Great American Songbook.

== Release and reception ==
It was released by Fresh Sound New Talent, after the Mehldau–Rossy album When I Fall in Love. The Penguin Guide to Jazz commented that Mehldau's "introduction and improvisation on 'Old Folks' are quite breathtaking and it's clear that the pristine touch of the later discs was already in place."

Professional ratings
Review scores
Source	Rating
The Penguin Guide to Jazz	3.5/4 stars

== Track listing ==
1. "Wonderful" (Ben Raleigh) – 13:55
2. "Spring Can Really Hang You Up the Most" (Fran Landesman, Tommy Wolf) – 11:58
3. "Old Folks" (Dedette Lee Hill, Willard Robison) – 10:01
4. "Sushi" (Mario Rossy) – 7:41
5. "Bodi" (Perico Sambeat) – 8:16
6. "Començar de Novo" (Ivan Lins) – 8:49
7. "Just One of Those Things" (Cole Porter) – 9:32
8. "No Blues" (Miles Davis) – 1:57

== Personnel ==
- Brad Mehldau – piano
- Perico Sambeat – alto sax
- Mario Rossy – bass
- Jorge Rossy – drums
