= Mario Rossy =

Mario Rossy is a jazz bassist, composer, and educator.

== Biography ==
In 1988, Rossy was a bassist for Tete Montoliu's And Orquestra Taller De Musics recording. In 1993, Rossy played on the albums New York-Barcelona Crossing, Volumen 1 and New York-Barcelona Crossing, Volumen 2, with saxophonist Perico Sambeat, pianist Brad Mehldau, and drummer Jorge Rossy, Mario's brother. A further recording from that year, When I Fall in Love, without Sambeat, was credited to the Mehldau & Rossy Trio.

Mario Rossy is an instructor at the Berklee College of Music.

== Discography ==
=== As leader/co-leader ===
Rossy plays bass on all albums.

Year recorded	Title	Label	Notes
1993	New York-Barcelona Crossing, Volumen 1	Fresh Sound	Quartet, co-led with Perico Sambeat (alto sax), Brad Mehldau (piano), Jorge Rossy (drums); in concert
1993	New York-Barcelona Crossing, Volumen 2	Fresh Sound	Quartet, co-led with Perico Sambeat (alto sax), Brad Mehldau (piano), Jorge Rossy (drums); in concert
1993	When I Fall in Love	Fresh Sound	Trio, as "Mehldau & Rossy Trio", with Brad Mehldau (piano), Jorge Rossy (drums); in concert

=== As sideman ===
Year recorded	Leader	Title	Label
1988	Tete Montoliu	And Orquestra Taller De Musics	Discmedi Blau
1996	Mark Turner	The Music of Mercedes Rossy	Fresh Sound
1997	Perico Sambeat and Bruce Barth	Jindungo	Fresh Sound
1999	George Colligan	Desire	Fresh Sound
2000	George Colligan	Como la Vida Puede Ser	Fresh Sound
