= Consenting adults (disambiguation) =

Consenting adult or consenting adults can refer to:

- Consent (criminal law), in particular in the case of sexual consent between two adults
- Consenting Adults (1992 film), a Anmerican thriller film, directed by Alan J. Pakula
- Consenting Adults (2007 film), a BBC Four television dramatisation of the events of the Wolfenden committee
- Consenting Adults (album), a 1994 album by Brad Mehldau, Mark Turner and Peter Bernstein
- Consenting Adult (film), a 1985 American made-for-television drama film
