= New York-Barcelona Crossing, Volumen 2 =

1993 jazz album

Live album by Brad Mehldau
- Released: 1993
- Recorded: May 10, 1993
- Venue: Jamboree Club, Barcelona
- Genre: Jazz
- Length: 1:00:08
- Label: Fresh Sound New Talent
- Producer: Jordi Pujol, Jordi Rossy

Brad Mehldau chronology
New York-Barcelona Crossing, Volumen 1 (1993)	New York-Barcelona Crossing, Volumen 2 (1993)	When I Fall in Love (1993)

New York-Barcelona Crossing, Volumen 2 is an album by jazz pianist Brad Mehldau, with Perico Sambeat (alto sax), Mario Rossy (bass) and Jorge Rossy (drums).

== Music and recording ==
The album was recorded in concert at the Jamboree Club in Barcelona on May 10, 1993. The material is mostly jazz standards and pieces from the Great American Songbook.

== Reception ==
The Penguin Guide to Jazz commented that this album was not as good as New York-Barcelona Crossing, Volumen 1, but that "It's Easy to Remember" is "another gorgeous ballad performance, at a dangerously slow tempo". The AllMusic reviewer wrote that "What is engrossing about the disc is the utter fluidity with which these four young musicians from varying backgrounds are able to communicate using the common language of standard songs."

Professional ratings
Review scores
Source	Rating
The Penguin Guide to Jazz	3/4 stars

== Track listing ==
1. "I've Told Every Little Star" (Jerome Kern)
2. "Un Poco Loco" (Bud Powell)
3. "Easy to Remember" (Richard Rodgers)
4. "Played Twice" (Thelonious Monk)
5. "Dat Dere" (Bobby Timmons)
6. "Cousin Mary" (John Coltrane)
7. "No Blues" (Miles Davis)

== Personnel ==
- Brad Mehldau – piano
- Perico Sambeat – alto sax
- Mario Rossy – bass
- Jorge Rossy – drums
