= The Original Mob =

Studio album by Jimmy Cobb
- Released: 2014
- Venue: Smoke
- Genre: Jazz
- Label: Smoke Sessions

The Original Mob is an album by jazz drummer Jimmy Cobb. It was released by Smoke Sessions.

== Background ==
Cobb met the other three musicians on this album – pianist Brad Mehldau, guitarist Peter Bernstein, and bassist John Webber – "at workshops that he led at the New School University in New York in the early 1990s". The four recorded together on Bernstein's first album: Somethin's Burnin', released in 1994.

== Music and recording ==
The album was recorded at Smoke when the club was closed. Cobb wrote two of the tracks – "Composition 101" and "Remembering You". Other tracks are standards or written by band members. The album was released by Smoke Sessions in 2014.

== Track listing ==
1. "Old Devil Moon"
2. "Amsterdam After Dark"
3. "Sunday in New York"
4. "Stranger in Paradise"
5. "Unrequited"
6. "Composition 101"
7. "Remembering U"
8. "Nobody Else But Me"
9. "Minor Blues"
10. "Lickety Split"

== Personnel ==
- Brad Mehldau – piano
- Peter Bernstein – guitar
- John Webber – bass
- Jimmy Cobb – drums
