= Signs Live! =

Live album by Peter Bernstein
- Released: 2017
- Recorded: 2015
- Venue: Jazz at Lincoln Center, NYC
- Genre: Jazz
- Length: 76:11 + 69:33
- Label: Smoke Sessions

Signs Live! (stylized as Signs LIVE!) is an album by jazz guitarist Peter Bernstein.

== Background ==
The quartet of guitarist Peter Bernstein, pianist Brad Mehldau, bassist Christian McBride, and drummer Gregory Hutchinson had recorded together in 1994, resulting in the album Signs of Life.

== Music and recording ==
Signs Live! was recorded in 2015. Most of the compositions are by Bernstein.

== Reception ==
Professional ratings
Review scores
Source	Rating
DownBeat	4/5 stars
The Times	4/5 stars

The reviewer for The Times concluded that "The results are, as you may expect, quite special." The DownBeat reviewer wrote: "Bernstein is a guitarist so good he often sounds like two guitarists in a duet. It reflects a mastery that is elegant, mellow and gently swinging, but not especially surprising."

== Track listing ==
Disc One

1. "Blues for Bulgaria"
2. "Hidden Pockets"
3. "Dragonfly"
4. "Jive Coffee"
5. "Pannonica"

Disc Two

1. "Useless Metaphor"
2. "Let Loose"
3. "All Too Real"
4. "Resplendor"
5. "Crepuscule with Nellie"/"We See"
6. "Cupcake"

== Personnel ==
- Peter Bernstein – guitar
- Brad Mehldau – piano
- Christian McBride – bass
- Gregory Hutchinson – drums
