= Another Shade of Blue =

Live album by Lee Konitz
- Released: 1999
- Recorded: December 21, 1997
- Genre: Jazz
- Label: Blue Note

Another Shade of Blue is an album by saxophonist Lee Konitz.

== Background ==
Konitz recorded Alone Together for Blue Note in 1996, with pianist Brad Mehldau and bassist Charlie Haden. Exactly a year later, the same band recorded Another Shade of Blue.

== Music and recording ==
The album was recorded at the Jazz Bakery in Los Angeles, in December 1997.

== Reception ==
Professional ratings
Review scores
Source	Rating
AllMusic	4/5 stars
The Penguin Guide to Jazz	3.5/4 stars

The JazzTimes reviewer commented that the tracks were too long and taken at a very slow tempo. The Penguin Guide to Jazz praised the renditions of "Body and Soul" and "What's New?", but preferred the earlier Alone Together recording.

== Track listing ==
1. "Another Shade of Blue" (Lee Konitz) – 10:50
2. "Everything Happens to Me" (Tom Adair, Matt Dennis) – 12:15
3. "What's New?" (Johnny Burke, Bob Haggart) – 15:49
4. "Body and Soul" (Frank Eyton, Johnny Green, Edward Heyman, Robert Sour) – 17:29
5. "All of Us" (Charlie Haden, Konitz, Brad Mehldau) – 11:27

== Personnel ==
- Lee Konitz – alto sax
- Brad Mehldau – piano
- Charlie Haden – bass
