= 10 Years Solo Live =

Live album by Brad Mehldau
- Released: October 16, 2015
- Recorded: June 7, 2004 – March 10, 2014
- Genre: Jazz
- Length: 5:05:39
- Label: Nonesuch
- Producer: Brad Mehldau

Brad Mehldau chronology
| Mehliana: Taming the Dragon (2014) | 10 Years Solo Live (2004–14) | Blues and Ballads (2012–14) |

10 Years Solo Live is a recording by jazz pianist Brad Mehldau. It contains solo piano tracks from 19 concerts in Europe during the period 2004–2014.

== Background ==
"Mehldau became a working musician at a time when jazz was engulfed by historicism, and he spent a lot of youthful energy swatting away one presumptive legacy or another. This could be one reason that his solo work deals sparingly with the jazz repertory." "In the late 1990s, Brad Mehldau began turning his refined attention to the exacting art Keith Jarrett had dominated for so long: unaccompanied acoustic-piano improvisation." Mehldau's previous solo piano albums were Elegiac Cycle (1999), Live in Tokyo (2003), and Live in Marciac (2006).

== Music and recording ==
The tracks are arranged by four themes: "Dark/Light", "The Concert", "Intermezzo/Rückblick", and "E Minor/E Major". Dark/Light "explores versions of Jeff Buckley's 'Dream Brother', which is followed by Lennon/McCartney's 'Blackbird'". In Mehldau's words, "'Rückblick' means a look backward, perhaps a reappraisal. Brahms's Intermezzo movement was a look back at what had taken place in his Sonata before moving to the final movement. Here, the listener is invited to look back to music that was recorded 10 or more years ago, in 2004 and 2005." The final theme uses minor and major variants of a key and references the first theme.

On "Dream Brother", Mehldau lets "a single-note pulse work as an emotional metronome before the layering really begins." "And I Love Her" is given a "fugue-like construction". "Smells Like Teen Spirit" has "pointillistic flourishes, a sound painting sourced from West Coast grunge with a Satie-like sensitivity." On the 2011 version of "Knives Out", "Arpeggios ripple, melodies flit across said ripples, and Radiohead's bluesy electronica is lent the power of Beethoven." "Junk" "has a light danceability about it stemming from just how damn tuneful it is." "Intermezzo in B-Flat Major" "is a kind of behold-these-chops moment, with Mehldau crossing over into classical territory with a virtuosity we’ve been well prepared for by this time."

The performances were recorded in concerts in Europe between June 7, 2004 and March 10, 2014.

== Releases ==
Mehldau explained that "the order of songs is not arbitrary, and I have tried to tell a story from beginning to end in the way I've sequenced it."

The original release, of a collection of eight LPs, was on October 16, 2015. The same material was issued as a four-CD collection, and made available by digital download, on November 13 of the same year.

== Reception ==
John Fordham of The Guardian commented on the recording's "slew of orchestrally rolling chordwork, tireless trills and corkscrewing contrapuntal playing". In a mixed review in The Daily Telegraph, Ivan Hewett wrote that several tracks "begin intriguingly, but then become gripped by a sense of their own importance, swelling up to an oppressively 'anthemic' weightiness." Nate Chinen, in The New York Times, believed that the release "contains some of the most impressive pianism Mr. Mehldau has captured on record." Nenad Georgievski of All About Jazz noted, "10 Years Solo Live doesn't feel like a compilation of selected performances put together, but the whole repertoire flows into a complete whole. Somehow these sound like a free-flowing single works. It's a beautiful release/box from a unique pianist who continually shows what the piano can do." Jeff Simon of The Buffalo News stated, "...it’s a stupendous collection of a decade of solo piano performances by Brad Mehldau all across Europe that proves that with the death of Michel Petrucciani, Mehldau is the only solo jazz pianist who deserves to be mentioned in the same breath as Keith Jarrett." Cormac Larkin of The Irish Times wrote, " To listen intently is to engage in the tangle of a great musician’s mind, one whose influence may now be discerned in pretty much every jazz pianist that has come after him. Nothing can replace the thrill of actually being in the room when Mehldau is in the act of creation, but 10 Years Solo Live is a close second."

Professional ratings
Aggregate scores
| Source | Rating |
|---|---|
| Metacritic | 84/100 |
Review scores
| Source | Rating |
| All About Jazz | 4/5 stars |
| AllMusic | 4/5 stars |
| The Buffalo News | 4/4 stars |
| The Daily Telegraph | 4/5 stars |
| Down Beat | 4/5 stars |
| Financial Times | 5/5 stars |
| The Guardian | 4/5 stars |
| The Irish Times | 5/5 stars |
| The Times | 4/5 stars |
| PopMatters | 8/10 |

== Track listing ==
| Track | Title | Composer(s) | Length | Recorded |
|---|---|---|---|---|
| CD1–1 | "Dream Brother" | Jeff Buckley | 13:34 | 5 Nov 2013 |
| CD1–2 | "Blackbird" | John Lennon / Paul McCartney | 6:30 | 18 Sep 2011 |
| CD1–3 | "Jigsaw Falling into Place" | Thom Yorke / Jonny Greenwood / Colin Greenwood / Phil Selway / Ed O'Brien | 11:52 | 17 Sep 2011 |
| CD1–4 | "Meditation I – Lord Watch over Me" | Brad Mehldau | 8:45 | 10 Mar 2014 |
| CD1–5 | "And I Love Her" | Lennon / McCartney | 15:59 | 8 Nov 2013 |
| CD1–6 | "My Favorite Things" | Richard Rodgers / Oscar Hammerstein II | 12:14 | 16 Mar 2010 |
| CD1–7 | "This Here" | Bobby Timmons | 8:15 | 16 Mar 2010 |
| CD2–1 | "Smells Like Teen Spirit" | Kurt Cobain | 9:37 | 16 Mar 2010 |
| CD2–2 | "Waltz for J. B." | Mehldau | 6:05 | 15 Jul 2010 |
| CD2–3 | "Get Happy" | Harold Arlen / Ted Koehler | 12:31 | 30 Oct 2010 |
| CD2–4 | "I'm Old Fashioned" | Jerome Kern / Johnny Mercer | 5:20 | 17 Mar 2010 |
| CD2–5 | "Teardrop" | Grantley Marshall / Andrew Vowles / Robert Del Naja / Elizabeth Fraser | 14:13 | 9 Jun 2011 |
| CD2–6 | "Holland" | Sufjan Stevens | 11:06 | 8 Nov 2013 |
| CD2–7 | "Meditation II – Love Meditation" | Mehldau | 5:53 | 17 Sep 2011 |
| CD2–8 | "Knives Out" | Yorke / Jonny Greenwood / Colin Greenwood / Selway / O'Brien | 11:34 | 29 Mar 2011 |
| CD3–1 | "Lost Chords" | Mehldau | 9:29 | 10 Jul 2005 |
| CD3–2 | "Countdown" | John Coltrane | 10:42 | 10 Jul 2005 |
| CD3–3 | "On the Street Where You Live" | Frederick Loewe / Alan Jay Lerner | 7:08 | 10 Jul 2005 |
| CD3–4 | "Think of One" | Thelonious Monk | 7:46 | 5 Aug 2004 |
| CD3–5 | "Zingaro/Paris" | Antônio Carlos Jobim / Mehldau | 10:42 | 10 Jul 2005 |
| CD3–6 | "John Boy" | Mehldau | 3:35 | 29 Mar 2011 |
| CD3–7 | "Intermezzo in B-flat major, Op. 76: No. 4" | Johannes Brahms | 2:39 | 7 Jun 2011 |
| CD3–8 | "Junk" | McCartney | 5:07 | 17 Nov 2004 |
| CD3–9 | "Los Angeles II" | Mehldau | 5:16 | 17 Nov 2004 |
| CD3–10 | "Monk's Mood" | Monk | 4:45 | 17 Nov 2004 |
| CD3–11 | "Knives Out" | Yorke / Jonny Greenwood / Colin Greenwood / Selway / O'Brien | 7:22 | 17 Nov 2004 |
| CD4–1 | "La Mémoire et la Mer" | Léo Ferré | 10:37 | 10 Sep 2011 |
| CD4–2 | "Bitter Sweet Symphony / Waterloo Sunset" | Richard Ashcroft / Keith Richards / Mick Jagger / Ray Davies | 15:50 | 29 Mar 2011 |
| CD4–3 | "Intermezzo in E minor, Op. 119: No. 2" | Brahms | 5:06 | 25 Mar 2011 |
| CD4–4 | "Interstate Love Song" | Eric Kretz / Robert DeLeo / Scott Weiland / Dean DeLeo | 17:58 | 10 Mar 2014 |
| CD4–5 | "Hey You" | Roger Waters | 11:07 | 18 Sep 2011 |
| CD4–6 | "God Only Knows" | Brian Wilson / Tony Asher | 16:44 | 9 Jun 2011 |

== Personnel ==
- Brad Mehldau – piano

== Charts ==
| Chart (2015) | Peak position |
|---|---|
| Belgian Albums (Ultratop Flanders) | 92 |
| Belgian Albums (Ultratop Wallonia) | 140 |
| French Albums (SNEP) | 176 |
| German Albums (Offizielle Top 100) | 59 |
| US Top Jazz Albums (Billboard) | 6 |
