= House on Hill =

Studio album by Brad Mehldau Trio
- Released: June 27, 2006
- Recorded: October 8 & 9, 2002 and March 12, 2005
- Studio: Avatar (New York, New York)
- Genre: Jazz
- Length: 67:29
- Label: Nonesuch; 7559-79911-2
- Producer: Brad Mehldau and Matt Pierson

Brad Mehldau chronology
Live in Tokyo (2003)	House on Hill (2002–05)	Day Is Done (2005)

House on Hill is an album by American pianist and composer Brad Mehldau released on the Nonesuch label in 2006. The album was mainly recorded at the sessions which produced Anything Goes (2004) and is the first album entirely composed by Mehldau since Places (2000).

== Reception ==
Professional ratings
Review scores
Source	Rating
AllMusic	3/5 stars
The Guardian	4/5 stars
Jazzwise	3/5 stars
The Penguin Guide to Jazz	3.5/4 stars
Tom Hull	B+

AllMusic awarded the album three stars out of five and in its review by Thom Jurek stated, "While this set is nowhere near as full of surprises as Day Is Done, it is nonetheless another chapter in the development of a singular composer and pianist". The Guardian's John Fordham gave it a 4 star rating and observed, "Mehldau's originals tend to be more private, enigmatic and, in some ways, classical than his imports, but the playing is typically mesmerising, those characteristic overlapping, interrogating left-right lines as vivaciously engaged as ever". On All About Jazz, Troy Collins noted, "Although House On Hill may not rise to the conceptual highs of Day Is Done, it is an impressive document from an artist who continues to refine himself". JazzTimes reviewer, Steve Greenlee commented, "As much as Ballard has stepped to the plate since Rossy’s departure, House on Hill is a reminder that Mehldau’s first trio was one amazing outfit". The album also received a "CHOC de l'ANNEE" from the French magazine "Jazzman".

== Track listing ==
All compositions by Brad Mehldau

1. "August Ending" – 7:00
2. "House on Hill" – 8:13
3. "Bealtine" – 9:20
4. "Boomer" – 7:17
5. "Backyard" – 5:44
6. "Fear and Trembling" – 5:26
7. "Embers" – 8:07
8. "Happy Tune" – 8:54
9. "Waiting for Eden" – 7:32

== Personnel ==
- Brad Mehldau – piano
- Larry Grenadier – bass
- Jorge Rossy – drums

== Credits ==
- Produced by Brad Mehldau and Matt Pierson
- Recorded and Mixed by James Farber
- Mastering by Greg Calbi
- Artwork by Benita Raphan
- Photography by Lourdes Delgado
