= Ademuz (album) =

Studio album by Perico Sambeat
- Released: 1998
- Recorded: August, November 1995
- Genre: Jazz
- Length: 55:35
- Label: Fresh Sound New Talent
- Producer: Perico Sambeat

Ademuz is an album by jazz saxophonist and flautist Perico Sambeat.

== Music and recording ==
The album was recorded in Valencia in August and November 1995. The compositions, all by Sambeat, are Latin jazz in style. Vocalist Enrique Morente appears on three tracks. The title track has "hard-hitting, quasi-fusion groove and keyboard, electric bass, and overdriven guitar textures, all of which give way to an acoustic ambience as the tune progresses." Pianist Brad Mehldau's recollection of the record was that it "combined jazz and flamenco music in a new way".

Sambeat was also producer for the album.

== Reception ==
The Penguin Guide to Jazz described it as "overcrowded with detail and noise", but concluded that it is "a charismatic and frequently exciting record."

Professional ratings
Review scores
| Source | Rating |
|---|---|
| AllMusic | 4.5/5 stars |
| The Penguin Guide to Jazz | 3.5/4 stars |

== Track listing ==
All compositions by Perico Sambeat.

1. "A Free K" – 9:56
2. "Ademuz" – 8:33
3. "Tu Rostro Oculto" – 8:17
4. "Expedición" – 9:03
5. "La Noche De Lemuria" – 6:07
6. "Porta Do Ferro" – 7:17
7. "Barri De La Coma" – 6:22

== Personnel ==
- Perico Sambeat – alto sax, flute
- Brad Mehldau – piano
- Mark Turner – tenor sax
- Michael Leonhart – trumpet
- Kurt Rosenwinkel – guitar
- Joe Martin – bass
- Jorge Rossy – drums
- Enric Canada, Guillermo McGuill – percussion
- Enrique Morente – vocals
