= Friendship (Perico Sambeat album) =

Studio album by Perico Sambeat
- Recorded: February 2003
- Genre: Jazz
- Label: ACT
- Producer: Perico Sambeat

Friendship is an album by jazz saxophonist Perico Sambeat.

== Background ==
This was Sambeat's first recording as leader for ACT Music. He was also the producer.

== Music and recording ==
The album was recorded at Knoop Studio, River Edge, New Jersey, in February 2003. All but one track ("Crazy She Calls Me") is a Sambeat original. Carmen Canela sings in Portuguese on one track.

== Reception ==
The Penguin Guide to Jazz suggested that the tracks were too similar and that more of Sambeat on soprano instead of alto sax would have helped this. BBC Music Magazine commented that "Mehldau, away from his own records, is free simply to play excellent piano", and "this is an often riveting sequence of originals". Writing for The Guardian, critic James Fordham gave the album 3 out of 5 stars, calling Sambeat ""an artist of imposing character within a straightish postbop context".

Professional ratings
Review scores
Source	Rating
The Guardian	3/5 stars
The Penguin Guide to Jazz	3/4 stars

== Track listing ==
All compositions by Perico Sambeat, except track 7.

1. "Memoria de un sueño" – 08:00
2. "Orbis" – 07:25
3. "Bioy" – 07:36
4. "Eterna" – 04:54
5. "Icaro" – 07:34
6. "Mirall" – 05:36
7. "Crazy She Calls Me" – 05:44
8. "Actors" – 05:03
9. "Matilda" – 07:34
10. "Iris" – 2:08

== Personnel ==
- Perico Sambeat – alto sax, soprano sax
- Brad Mehldau – piano
- Kurt Rosenwinkel – guitar
- Ben Street – bass
- Jeff Ballard – drums
- Carmen Canela – vocals
