= Marian McPartland's Piano Jazz with Brad Mehldau =

Studio album by Marian McPartland, Brad Mehldau
- Released: 2007
- Recorded: September 1996
- Genre: Jazz
- Length: 56:03
- Label: Concord/ Jazz Alliance
- Producer: Shari Hutchinson

Brad Mehldau chronology
The Art of the Trio Volume One (1996)	Marian McPartland's Piano Jazz with Brad Mehldau (1996)	Live at the Village Vanguard: The Art of the Trio Volume Two (1997)

Professional ratings
Review scores
Source	Rating
AllMusic	3/5 stars
PopMatters	6/10 stars
The Penguin Guide to Jazz Recordings	3/4 stars

Marian McPartland's Piano Jazz with Brad Mehldau is an album by jazz pianists Marian McPartland and Brad Mehldau. The recording was released as a CD in 2007.

== Music and recording ==
The contents of the album were first recorded for NPR broadcast in September 1996. The radio broadcast was one in a long series of Piano Jazz programs that featured jazz pianist Marian McPartland in conversation and playing with another musician. The material played is a combination of Mehldau originals and standards.

The two pianists play both individually and together. On "From This Moment On", Mehldau "utilizes multiple lines simultaneously rather than simply soloing against standard chord changes." He uses imaginative voicings on "When I Fall in Love". "McPartland's solos include moving renditions of 'I Get Along Without You Very Well' and the less frequently performed 'I See Your Face Before Me'". They duet on "Stella By Starlight" and "Our Love Is Here to Stay", and "a lively improvised blues to wrap up the date." During the conversations, "McPartland gets him to talk about some of his core concepts: the 'voice lead' (with 'several voices going at one time'), the implicit rather than stated beat (which requires 'keeping the pulse in my head'), and 'compositionally compact' thematic development."

== Track listing ==
1. "Conversation" – 3:35
2. "From This Moment On" (Cole Porter) – 4:44
3. "Conversation" – 4:19
4. "Ron's Place" (Brad Mehldau) – 4:30
5. "Conversation" – 1:22
6. "Stella by Starlight" (Ned Washington, Victor Young) – 4:23
7. "Conversation" – 1:55
8. "I Get Along Without You Very Well (Except Sometimes)" (Hoagy Carmichael) – 4:02
9. "Conversation" – 2:23
10. "When I Fall in Love" (Edward Heyman, Victor Young) – 4:35
11. "Conversation" – 2:59
12. "(Our) Love Is Here to Stay" (George Gershwin, Ira Gershwin) – 5:28
13. "Conversation" – 0:58
14. "I See Your Face Before Me" (Howard Dietz, Arthur Schwartz) – 3:54
15. "Conversation" – 3:34
16. "No Particular Blues" (Marian McPartland, Mehldau) – 3:16
17. "Conversation" – 0:06

== Personnel ==
- Marian McPartland – piano, speech
- Brad Mehldau – piano, speech
