= Adama (album) =

Studio album by Avishai Cohen
- Released: 1998
- Recorded: 1997
- Genre: Jazz
- Label: Stretch
- Producers: Avishai Cohen, Chick Corea

Professional ratings
Review scores
Source	Rating
AllMusic	4/5 stars
The Penguin Guide to Jazz	3.5/4 stars

Adama is the debut album by bassist Avishai Cohen.

== Background ==
This was Cohen's first recording as leader. He co-produced it with Chick Corea.

== Music and recording ==
All but one of the tracks were written by Cohen; the other is "Besame Mucho".

No.	Title	Length
1.	"Ora"	4:19
2.	"Madrid"	4:45
3.	"Bass Suite #1"	5:51
4.	"Reunion of the Souls"	5:20
5.	"Dror"	5:17
6.	"No Change"	4:30
7.	"Bass & Bone Fantasy"	4:07
8.	"Adama"	5:56
9.	"Bass Suite #2"	4:37
10.	"Besame Mucho" (Consuelo Velázquez)	7:24
11.	"Gadu"	6:20
12.	"Jasonity"	1:18

== Personnel ==
- Avishai Cohen – bass
- Steve Wilson – soprano sax
- Steve Davis – trombone
- Jason Lindner, Brad Mehldau - (track 10), Danilo Pérez – piano
- Chick Corea – Fender Rhodes (track 11)
- Amos Hoffman – guitar, oud
- Jeff Ballard – drums, percussion
- Jorge Rossy – drums (tracks 10, 11)
- Don Alias – congas (track 11)
- Claudia Acuña – vocals (track 12)
