= When I Fall in Love (Mehldau & Rossy Trio album) =

Live album by Brad Mehldau, Mario Rossy, Jorge Rossy
- Released: 1993
- Recorded: October 9–10, 1993
- Venue: La Cova del Drac, Barcelona
- Genre: Jazz
- Length: 67:13
- Label: Fresh Sound New Talent

Brad Mehldau chronology
New York-Barcelona Crossing, Volumen 2 (1993)	When I Fall in Love (1993)	Consenting Adults (1994)

When I Fall in Love is an album by the Mehldau & Rossy Trio, consisting of pianist Brad Mehldau, bassist Mario Rossy, and drummer Jorge Rossy.

== Music and recording ==
The album was recorded in concert at La Cova del Drac in Barcelona on October 9 and 10, 1993.

On the up-tempo "Anthropology", Mehldau plays the melody "note for note and then begins to move through the lower register for sevenths and ninths, playing 16th and even 32nd notes to corral the rhythm section as he moves the scale over first a half, then a whole, and then two and a half steps." Jorge Rossy arranged "I Didn't Know What Time It Was" in a 5/4 time signature, and the band played some of the bars with four beats. The title track contains a piano cadenza towards the start and end.

== Reception ==
The AllMusic reviewer wrote that "This may not be as great as some of Meldau's later trio work, but it is very impressive for such an early date."

Professional ratings
Review scores
Source	Rating
AllMusic	4/5 stars
The Penguin Guide to Jazz	3.5/4 stars

== Track listing ==
1. "Anthropology" (Charlie Parker) – 8:22
2. "At a Loss" (Brad Mehldau) – 6:32
3. "When I Fall in Love" (Victor Young, Edward Heyman) – 14:20
4. "Countdown" (John Coltrane) – 8:16
5. "Convalescent" (Mehldau) – 8:22
6. "I Fall in Love Too Easily" (Jule Styne, Sammy Cahn) – 10:35
7. "I Didn't Know What Time It Was" (Richard Rodgers, Lorenz Hart) – 9:40

== Personnel ==
- Brad Mehldau – piano
- Mario Rossy – bass
- Jorge Rossy – drums
