= Consenting Adults (album) =

Studio album
- Released: 2000
- Recorded: December 26, 1994
- Studio: New York City, New York
- Genre: Jazz
- Length: 65:03
- Label: Criss Cross
- Producer: Gerry Teekens

Brad Mehldau chronology
When I Fall in Love (1993)	Consenting Adults (1994)	Introducing Brad Mehldau (1995)

Professional ratings
Review scores
Source	Rating
The Penguin Guide to Jazz Recordings	3.5/4 stars

Consenting Adults is an album by MTB, a quintet consisting of Brad Mehldau (piano), Mark Turner (tenor sax), Peter Bernstein (guitar), Larry Grenadier (bass), and Leon Parker (drums).

== Music and recording ==
The album was recorded in New York City on December 26, 1994. The first track, "Belief", "starts out with some Charleston off beats before leading into a Messengers-type shuffle."

The album was released in 2000. Mehldau commented that "it captured all of us when we were right at the beginning of developing our own voices." All members of the quintet went on to be successful jazz musicians.

== Track listing ==
1. "Belief" (Leon Parker) – 6:50
2. "Little Melonae I" (Jackie McLean) – 7:15
3. "Phantasm" (Peter Bernstein) – 9:39
4. "Afterglow" (Bernstein) – 5:49
5. "Limbo" (Wayne Shorter) – 7:28
6. "Consenting Adults" (Brad Mehldau) – 9:07
7. "From This Moment On" (Cole Porter) – 6:09
8. "Peace" (Horace Silver) – 5:59
9. "Little Melonae II" (McLean) – 6:43

== Personnel ==
- Brad Mehldau – piano
- Mark Turner – tenor sax
- Peter Bernstein – guitar
- Larry Grenadier – bass
- Leon Parker – drums
