= Alone Together (Lee Konitz album) =

Live album by Lee Konitz, Brad Mehldau & Charlie Haden
- Released: 1997
- Recorded: December 1996
- Genre: Jazz
- Label: Blue Note

Alone Together is an album by saxophonist Lee Konitz.

== Background and recording ==
This was Konitz's first recording for Blue Note Records. The album was recorded at the Jazz Bakery in Los Angeles, in December 1996. The tracks are standards.

== Reception ==
Professional ratings
Review scores
Source	Rating
AllMusic	4.5/5 stars
The Penguin Guide to Jazz	4/4 stars

The AllMusic reviewer stated that "all three musicians are restless and inventive, making even the simplest numbers on the disc vibrant, lively and adventurous". The Penguin Guide to Jazz commented that "Konitz was playing with magisterial calm and an elder statesman's mischief", and highlighted Mehldau's creation of "a feeling of space and relaxed time".

== Track listing ==
1. "Alone Together" (Howard Dietz, Arthur Schwartz) – 13:48
2. "The Song Is You" (Oscar Hammerstein II, Jerome Kern) – 12:54
3. "Cherokee" (Ray Noble) – 10:59
4. "What Is This Thing Called Love?" (Cole Porter) – 11:32
5. "'Round Midnight" (Thelonious Monk, Cootie Williams) – 12:49
6. "You Stepped Out of a Dream" (Nacio Herb Brown, Gus Kahn) – 12:54

== Personnel ==
- Lee Konitz – alto sax
- Brad Mehldau – piano
- Charlie Haden – bass
