= Signs of Life (Peter Bernstein album) =

Studio album by Peter Bernstein
- Released: May 2, 1995
- Recorded: December 17, 1994
- Studio: RPM Studios, New York City
- Genre: Jazz
- Length: 71:58
- Label: Criss Cross
- Producer: K. Hasselpflug

Peter Bernstein chronology
Somethin's Burnin' (1992)	Signs of Life (1995)	Brain Dance (1996)

Signs of Life is an album by jazz guitarist Peter Bernstein that was released by Criss Cross Jazz in 1995.

Professional ratings
Review scores
Source	Rating
AllMusic	4.5/5 stars

== Track listing ==
All tracks are written by Peter Bernstein except where noted.

No.	Title	Length
1.	"Blues for Bulgaria"	8:06
2.	"Jet Stream"	7:19
3.	"Jive Coffee"	9:45
4.	"The Things We Did Last Summer" (Jule Styne, Sammy Cahn)	6:48
5.	"Minor Changes"	8:10
6.	"Will You Still Be Mine?" (Tom Adair, Matt Dennis)	6:59
7.	"Signs of Life"	9:45
8.	"Nobody Else But Me" (Oscar Hammerstein II, Jerome Kern)	8:06
9.	"My Ideal" (Newell Chase, Leo Robin, Richard A. Whiting)	7:20

== Personnel ==
- Peter Bernstein – guitar
- Brad Mehldau – piano
- Christian McBride – double bass
- Gregory Hutchinson – drums
