= Largo (Brad Mehldau album) =

Studio album by Brad Mehldau
- Released: August 13, 2002
- Recorded: April 2–8, 2001
- Studio: Capitol Studio B (Hollywood, California)
- Genre: Jazz
- Length: 65:30
- Label: Warner Bros. 9362 48114-2
- Producer: Jon Brion

Brad Mehldau chronology
Progression: The Art of the Trio, Vol. 5 (2000)	Largo (2002)	Anything Goes (2002)

Largo is an album by American pianist and composer Brad Mehldau released on the Warner Bros. label in 2002. The album is a departure from Mehldau's earlier straight-ahead jazz albums, instead featuring a more experimental pop-influenced sound and extensive use of session musicians.

== Reception ==
Professional ratings
Review scores
Source	Rating
AllMusic	3/5 stars
The Guardian	4/5 stars
The Penguin Guide to Jazz	3.5/4 stars
Sputnikmusic	4.4/5

The Guardian's John Fordham gave it a 4-star rating and observed "Mehldau is framed quite differently on Largo – a setting that includes chamber-classical woodwind and brass and a percussion sound deploying hip-hop and drum'n'bass grooves. He also plays electric keyboards at times, and the influence of producer Jon Brion – Mehldau's principal collaborator on the project, though the pianist wrote all the arrangements - was clearly critical".

AllMusic awarded the album 3 stars, and in its review by Robert L. Doerschuk stated "what intrigues most about Largo in the end is the perspective it offers on Mehldau, whose playing here is, as always, intelligent, perhaps a bit cerebral, and now open as well to sonic exotica".

JazzTimes reviewer Russel Carlson noted "Even with the added musicians and sounds, Mehldau's piano is, as it should be, the focal point of Largo. His playing remains a little sinister and sad on the CD, but he has also lightened his touch and his melodies and harmonies are refreshingly simpler this time around".

The album was issued on vinyl for the first time in 2023.

== Track listing ==
All tracks are written by Brad Mehldau, except where noted.

No.	Title	Writer(s)	Length
1.	"When It Rains"		6:36
2.	"You're Vibing Me"		3:28
3.	"Dusty McNugget"		5:43
4.	"Dropjes"	Mehldau, Darek Oleszkiewicz, Justin Meldal-Johnsen, Jon Brion, Matt Chamberlain, Victor Indrizzo	3:58
5.	"Paranoid Android" (Radiohead cover)	Thom Yorke, Jonny Greenwood, Ed O'Brien, Colin Greenwood, Phil Selway	9:05
6.	"Franklin Avenue"		3:42
7.	"Sabbath"		4:42
8.	"Dear Prudence" (The Beatles cover)	Lennon-McCartney	5:22
9.	"Free Willy"	Mehldau, Chamberlain, Larry Grenadier, Jorge Rossy	5:06
10.	"Alvarado"		4:00
11.	"Wave/Mother Nature's Son"	Antônio Carlos Jobim/Lennon-McCartney	6:29
12.	"I do"		7:18
Total length:			65:30

== Personnel ==
- Brad Mehldau – piano, vibes, prepared piano
- Larry Grenadier (tracks 1, 2 & 9), Darek Oleszkiewicz (tracks 2–6, 8, 10 & 11) – bass
- Matt Chamberlain – drums, percussion, tabla (tracks 1–11)
- Jim Keltner – drums, snare drum, vibraphone (tracks 2, 3, 5, 6, 8, 10)
- Victor Indrizzo (tracks 4, 10 & 11), Jorge Rossy (tracks 2 & 9) – drums, percussion
- Jon Brion – guitar synthesizer, guitar treatments, percussion (tracks 4, 5 & 11)
- Justin Meldal-Johnsen – electric bass (tracks 4, 10 & 11)
- Peter Mandell, Rose Corrigan – bassoon (tracks 1 & 12)
- Emile Bernstein, Gary Gray – clarinet (tracks 1 & 12)
- David Shostac, Steve Kujala – flute (tracks 1 & 12)
- Earle Dumler, Jon Clark – oboe (tracks 1 & 12)
- Daniel Kelley, Philip Yao – French horn (tracks 3 & 6)
- William Reichenbach – trombone (tracks 3 & 6)
- George B. Thatcher – bass trombone (tracks 3 & 6)

== Credits ==
- Produced by Jon Brion
- Engineered by Thomas Biller
- Mastering by Doug Sax & Robert Hadley
- Art Direction and Design by Lawrence Azerrad
- Photography by Tina Tyrell
