= Progression: The Art of the Trio, Vol. 5 =

Live album by Brad Mehldau
- Released: July 31, 2001
- Recorded: September 22–24, 2000
- Venue: Village Vanguard (New York City)
- Genre: Jazz
- Length: 136:00
- Label: Warner Bros. 9362-48005-2
- Producer: Matt Pierson

Brad Mehldau chronology
Places (2000)	Progression: The Art of the Trio, Vol. 5 (2001)	Largo (2002)

Progression: The Art of the Trio, Vol. 5 is a live album by American pianist and composer Brad Mehldau released on the Warner Bros. label in 2001.

== Reception ==
Professional ratings
Review scores
Source	Rating
AllMusic	4/5 stars
The Guardian	4/5 stars
The Penguin Guide to Jazz	3/4 stars

The album received universally favourable reviews. AllMusic awarded the album 4 stars and in its review by Paula Edelstein, she states "his intrinsic musical signature is more substantial on Progression due to several stunning piano solos, ethereal vamps, and successive thematic transformations". The Guardian's John Fordham observed "The way in which Mehldau develops improvisations thematically - eventually interweaving fragments of the original tune and spontaneous motifs until the pieces take on the character of 10-minute compositions rather than variations on much shorter originals - grows increasingly riveting". PopMatters reviewer Maurice Bottomley said "Progression offers over two hours of keyboard improvisation at the highest level. Almost equally divided between self-penned numbers and standards, nothing here serves to diminish the growing suspicion that Mehldau may well be the most significant piano talent to emerge in recent years" On All About Jazz, Glenn Astarita noted "the musicians shrewdly utilize space and depth as a vehicle to implement fragmented shifts in strategy as they also expand, contract, modify, and replenish their combined mode of attack in altogether stunning fashion. Strongly recommended". On the same site David Adler stated "Without a doubt, his trio remains one of the most identifiable groups in jazz, and Progression is one of its most substantial documents to date". JazzTimes reviewer, Stuart Nicholson commented "Mehldau is gradually living down the hyperbole that surrounded his early recordings, and he has exceeded expectations to become a significant musician".

== Track listing ==
All compositions by Brad Mehldau except as indicated

Disc One:

1. "The More I See You" (Harry Warren, Mack Gordon) - 10:05
2. "Dream's Monk" - 11:21
3. "The Folks Who Live On the Hill" (Oscar Hammerstein II, Jerome Kern) - 9:50
4. "Alone Together" (Howard Dietz, Arthur Schwartz) - 15:01
5. "It Might as Well Be Spring" (Hammerstein, Rodgers) - 2:48
6. "Cry Me a River" (Arthur Hamilton) - 8:50
7. "River Man" (Nick Drake) - 11:29

Disc Two:

1. "Quit" - 7:13
2. "Secret Love" (Paul Francis Webster, Sammy Fain) - 10:06
3. "Sublation" - 14:58
4. "Resignation" - 8:39
5. "Long Ago (and Far Away)" (Ira Gershwin, Kern) - 14:50
6. "How Long Has This Been Going On?" (George Gershwin, Ira Gershwin) - 10:44

== Personnel ==
- Brad Mehldau - Piano
- Larry Grenadier - Bass
- Jorge Rossy - Drums

== Credits ==
- Produced by Matt Pierson
- Recorded by Adam Blackburn
- Mixing by James Farber
- Mastering by Greg Calbi
- Art Direction and Design by Lawrence Azerrad
