= Havana Cafe =

Cafe in Syria

Coordinates: 33°30′52.6″N 36°17′42.3″E

Established in 1945, Havana Cafe (Arabic: مَقْهًى الْهَافَانَا, romanized: Maqhan al-Hāfānā) is a noted cafe situated in the al Bahsa Area in Damascus City, Syria. During the modern period the cafe became well known for its elite class of visitors, including politicians, high-ranking military officers, poets, artists, authors and journalists, in addition to a number of political refugees. The cafe is sometimes referred to as the birthplace of novels, poems, political conspiracies and even coups.
