= Your Mother Should Know: Brad Mehldau Plays The Beatles =

Studio album by Brad Mehldau
- Released: 10 February 2023
- Recorded: September 2020
- Venue: Philharmonie de Paris
- Genre: Jazz
- Length: 48:28
- Label: Nonesuch
- Producer: Brad Mehldau

Brad Mehldau chronology
Suite: April 2020 (2020)	Your Mother Should Know: Brad Mehldau Plays The Beatles (2020)	Jacob's Ladder (2020-2021)

Your Mother Should Know: Brad Mehldau Plays The Beatles is a solo piano album by Brad Mehldau. It was recorded in September 2020 and released by Nonesuch Records on 10 February 2023.

== Music and recording ==
The album was recorded live on the stage of the Philharmonie de Paris in September 2020 where Mehldau played a program of Beatles songs that were previously unperformed by him. Mehldau also recorded the David Bowie track "Life on Mars?"

== Release and reception ==
Professional ratings
Aggregate scores
Source	Rating
Metacritic	86%
Review scores
Source	Rating
All About Jazz	4/5 stars
AllMusic	4/5 stars
The Guardian	4/5 stars
Jazzwise	4/5 stars
Mojo	4/5 stars
PopMatters	9/10
The Times	5/5 stars
Tom Hull	B

Matt Collar of AllMusic commented, "...Mehldau treating each Beatles tune as he might a jazz standard, reconsidering the harmony of the song and using the melody as jumping-off point for his own bold, endlessly lyrical improvisations. What's particularly enjoyable about Mehldau's approach is how he keeps each song recognizable while making it his own..." Selwyn Harris of Jazzwise stated, "Recorded live at the Philharmonie de Paris, it focusses mostly on a selection of the Fab Four's lesser-known album tracks, none of which have been recorded by him previously. Throughout, Mehldau is at his most succinctly refined, as if he has chipped away at anything non-essential or that sounds like it's falling into the trap of merely jazzing up The Beatles, as those before him have too frequently done."

Martin Johnson of The Wall Street Journal wrote that "The new album aims for smaller changes rather than full-blown reinvention." Steven Wine writing for Associated Press added, "The album pairs jazz’s most lyrical living pianist with songwriting masters of melody, and Mehldau finds fresh radiance in the familiar tunes by exploring their elasticity, which is considerable. These performances show how Beatles songs invite improvisation thanks to their lilt, sturdy construction and sophisticated chord changes. Plus, as Mehldau observes in his liner notes, they swing."

== Track listing ==
All tracks are written by Lennon–McCartney except where noted.

No.	Title	Writer(s)	Length
1.	"I Am the Walrus"		4:14
2.	"Your Mother Should Know"		2:18
3.	"I Saw Her Standing There"		3:54
4.	"For No One"		2:28
5.	"Baby's in Black"		7:19
6.	"She Said She Said"		2:42
7.	"Here, There and Everywhere"		3:58
8.	"If I Needed Someone"	George Harrison	2:25
9.	"Maxwell's Silver Hammer"		6:42
10.	"Golden Slumbers"		8:17
11.	"Life on Mars?"	David Bowie	4:09
Total length:			48:28

== Personnel ==
- Brad Mehldau – piano

== Chart performance ==
Chart (2020)	Peak position
Swiss Albums (Schweizer Hitparade)	30
Belgian Albums (Ultratop Wallonia)	150
