= Suite: April 2020 =

Studio album by Brad Mehldau
- Released: June 12, 2020
- Recorded: April 23–24, 2020
- Studios: Power Sound Studios, Amsterdam
- Genre: Jazz
- Length: 40:21
- Label: Nonesuch
- Producer: Brad Mehldau

Brad Mehldau chronology
Finding Gabriel (2017–18)	Suite: April 2020 (2020)	Your Mother Should Know: Brad Mehldau Plays The Beatles (2020)

Suite: April 2020 is a solo piano album by Brad Mehldau. It was recorded in 2020 and released later that year by Nonesuch Records.

== Background ==
During the COVID-19 pandemic, Mehldau was at home in Amsterdam with his family. During that period, in April 2020, he wrote twelve pieces based on his experiences at that time. Bob Hurwitz, chairman emeritus of Nonesuch Records, encouraged the pianist to compose the music "designed to reflect the deep insecurities, comforting rituals and unexpected graces of the time". Mehldau himself describes the album as "a musical snapshot of life in the last month in the world in which we've all found ourselves."

== Music and recording ==
For the album, three compositions by others were added to the twelve pieces by Mehldau. The album was recorded on April 23 and 24, 2020, at Power Sound Studios in Amsterdam. All of the pieces were performed solo on piano by Mehldau. No piece exceeds four minutes in length, in contrast with many of his previous more improvisation-based performances.

In the final piece, "Look for the Silver Lining", "Mehldau intentionally ends on the V chord, leaving the sound – and the situation – in an unresolved state."

== Release and reception ==
Professional ratings
Review scores
Source	Rating
All About Jazz	3/5 stars
AllMusic	3.5/5 stars
DownBeat	4/5 stars
Jazz Forum	5/5 stars
Jazz Journal	4/5 stars
Mojo	4/5 stars
The Times	3/5 stars
Tom Hull	A−

Suite: April 2020 was released on limited-edition 180-gram vinyl and for download by Nonesuch Records on June 12, 2020. Nonesuch released the CD and standard vinyl editions on September 18 of the same year.

DownBeat wrote, "If its bite-size pieces are easily digestible, so are its penetrating melodies. Like the thinned-out harmonies, they emphasize the isolation at the heart of both the work and the context." JazzTimes described the 12-piece suite as "mostly muted, introspective music". Thomas Fletcher writing for Jazz Journal added, "As ever, Mehldau’s graceful touch continues to send me into deep reflection. The titles of each composition are named appropriately... Each homes in on individual thoughts and memories which are reflected the music." Chris Pearson of The Times observed, " Now Brad Mehldau re-emerges with the first Covid-themed solo jazz album. Is this wise? As the world gradually gropes its way back to normality we are perhaps realising why previous pandemics were forgotten: those who lived through them wanted it that way. Does this set already belong to the past? Perhaps not."

== Track listing ==
All tracks are written by Brad Mehldau except track 13 written by Neil Young, track 14 written by Billy Joel, and track 15 written by Jerome Kern and Buddy DeSylva.

No.	Title	Length
1.	"Suite: April 2020: I. Waking Up"	1:14
2.	"Suite: April 2020: II. Stepping Outside"	2:18
3.	"Suite: April 2020: III. Keeping Distance"	2:52
4.	"Suite: April 2020: IV. Stopping, Listening: Hearing"	1:56
5.	"Suite: April 2020: V. Remembering Before All This"	3:39
6.	"Suite: April 2020: VI. Uncertainty"	1:51
7.	"Suite: April 2020: VII. The Day Moves By"	1:57
8.	"Suite: April 2020: VIII. Yearning"	3:31
9.	"Suite: April 2020: IX. Waiting"	3:14
10.	"Suite: April 2020: X. In the Kitchen"	2:57
11.	"Suite: April 2020: XI. Family Harmony"	2:54
12.	"Suite: April 2020: XII. Lullaby"	3:13
13.	"Don't Let It Bring You Down"	2:06
14.	"New York State of Mind"	3:06
15.	"Look for the Silver Lining"	3:31
Total length:		40:21

== Personnel ==
- Brad Mehldau – piano

=== Chart performance ===
Chart (2020)	Peak position
Portuguese Albums (AFP)	43
