= The Natural Moment =

Studio album by Christopher Hollyday
- Recorded: January 1991
- Genre: Jazz
- Label: RCA Novus

The Natural Moment is a studio album by jazz alto saxophonist Christopher Hollyday.

== Background ==
This was alto saxophonist Christopher Hollyday's third album. It was pianist Brad Mehldau's first recording.

== Music and recording ==
The album was recorded in January 1991. Hollyday "performs five of his driving originals and a song apiece from Peter Bernstein, Walter Davis Jr., John Webber, and Cole Porter."

== Release and reception ==
Professional ratings
Review scores
Source	Rating
AllMusic	4/5 stars
DownBeat	4.5/5 stars
The Penguin Guide to Jazz	2.5/4 stars

The Natural Moment was released by RCA Novus. The Chicago Tribune reviewer commented that Hollyday's album "represents a musical advance over his second and almost justifies the attention given his first". The Penguin Guide to Jazz wrote that "the music seems over-intense, as if Hollyday were reacting to the usual charges of neo-conservatism by trying to prove how impolite he can be".

== Track listing ==
1. "Scorpio Rising" – 7:42
2. "Had to Be Brad" – 4:34
3. "All New Meaning" – 2:45
4. "Point of Delirium" – 6:15
5. "Every Time We Say Goodbye" – 6:04
6. "Johnny Red" – 7:48
7. "Afterglow" – 5:23
8. "Idleism" – 4:57
9. "The Natural Moment" – 5:32

== Personnel ==
- Christopher Hollyday – alto sax
- Brad Mehldau – piano
- John Webber – bass
- Ron Savage – drums
