= Live at the Village Vanguard: The Art of the Trio Volume Two =

Live album by Brad Mehldau
- Released: March 10, 1998
- Recorded: July 29–August 3, 1997
- Venue: Village Vanguard (New York City)
- Genre: Jazz
- Length: 73:00
- Label: Warner Bros. 9362-46848-2
- Producer: Matt Pierson

Brad Mehldau chronology
Marian McPartland's Piano Jazz with Brad Mehldau (1996)	Live at the Village Vanguard: The Art of the Trio Volume Two (1997)	Songs: The Art of the Trio Volume Three (1998)

Live at the Village Vanguard: The Art of the Trio Volume Two is a live album by American pianist and composer Brad Mehldau released on the Warner Bros. label in 1998.

== Reception ==
Professional ratings
Review scores
Source	Rating
AllMusic	4/5 stars
The Penguin Guide to Jazz	4/4 stars
The Rolling Stone Jazz & Blues Album Guide	4/5 stars

AllMusic awarded the album 4 stars and in its review by Joel Roberts, states "It takes a certain nerve for a young jazz artist to subtitle an album Live at the Village Vanguard. The title evokes some mighty powerful spirits from the jazz pantheon. John Coltrane, Sonny Rollins. Bill Evans. Joe Henderson. But pianist Brad Mehldau is more than up to this daunting challenge... he has made a stunning album of exploratory jazz that holds its own with the great "Live at the Village Vanguard" recordings of the past".

== Track listing ==
1. "It's All Right with Me" (Cole Porter) - 12:39
2. "Young and Foolish" (Albert Hague, Arnold B. Horwitt) - 13:07
3. "Monk's Dream" (Thelonious Monk) - 11:09
4. "The Way You Look Tonight" (Dorothy Fields, Jerome Kern) - 12:33
5. "Moon River" (Henry Mancini, Johnny Mercer) - 10:52
6. "Countdown" (John Coltrane) - 12:40

== Personnel ==
Musicians

- Brad Mehldau - Piano
- Larry Grenadier - Bass
- Jorge Rossy - Drums

Production

- Matt Pierson – producer
- James Farber – engineer
- Greg Calbi – engineer (mastering)
- Dana Watson – production coordination
- Rey International – art direction, design
- Larry Fink – photography
