= Art of the Trio 4: Back at the Vanguard =

Live album by Brad Mehldau
- Released: September 28, 1999
- Recorded: January 5–10, 1999
- Venue: Village Vanguard (New York City)
- Genre: Jazz
- Length: 75:48
- Label: Warner Bros. 9362 47463-2
- Producer: Matt Pierson

Brad Mehldau chronology
Elegiac Cycle (1999)	Art of the Trio 4: Back at the Vanguard (1999)	Places (2000)

Art of the Trio 4: Back at the Vanguard is a live album by American pianist and composer Brad Mehldau released on the Warner Bros. label in 1999.

== Reception ==
Professional ratings
Review scores
Source	Rating
AllMusic	4.5/5 stars
The Penguin Guide to Jazz	4/4 stars

AllMusic awarded the album 4½ stars and in its review by Stephen Thomas Erlewine, he states "as this exceptional album proves, there is considerable emotion and feeling and plain excitement behind his music, even during the mesmerizing quiet sections". On All About Jazz, John Sharpe noted "Mehldau and his trio have changed and evolved since his early recordings and have now established their own, unique voice". JazzTimes reviewer, Josef Woodard commented "It's a live affair in more ways than one, full of the detours and shameless explorations on-the-fly that Mehldau is wont to make in the course of jazz duty. Mehldau's debt to the re-inventive impulse, and the classical instincts, in Keith Jarrett's playing are still identifiable, but his personal voice keeps emerging afresh".

== Track listing ==
All compositions by Brad Mehldau except as indicated

1. "All the Things You Are" (Oscar Hammerstein II, Jerome Kern) - 13:44
2. "Sehnsucht" - 10:48
3. "Nice Pass" - 17:35
4. "Solar" (Miles Davis) - 9:54
5. "London Blues" - 7:37
6. "I'll Be Seeing You" (Sammy Fain, Irving Kahal) - 7:17
7. "Exit Music (For a Film)" (Radiohead) - 8:53

== Personnel ==
- Brad Mehldau - Piano
- Larry Grenadier - Bass
- Jorge Rossy - Drums

== Credits ==
- Produced by Matt Pierson
- Recorded by David Oakes
- Mixing by James Farber
- Mastering by Mark Wilder
- Art Direction and Design by Lawrence Azerrad
- Photography by John Clark
