= Somethin's Burnin' =

Studio album by Peter Bernstein
- Released: April 6, 1994
- Recorded: December 22, 1992
- Genre: Jazz
- Length: 59:58
- Label: Criss Cross
- Producer: Gerry Teekens

Peter Bernstein chronology
Somethin's Burnin' (1994)	Signs of Life (1995)

Somethin's Burnin is the debut album by jazz guitarist Peter Bernstein that was released by Criss Cross Jazz in 1994.

Professional ratings
Review scores
Source	Rating
AllMusic	4.0/5 stars
The Penguin Guide to Jazz Recordings	2.5/4 stars

== Track listing ==
No.	Title	Length
1.	"This Could Be the Start of Something Big" (Steve Allen)	9:08
2.	"Afterglow" (Bernstein)	5:08
3.	"Booker's Little Blues" (Bernstein)	10:01
4.	"Mr. Kenyatta" (Lee Morgan)	7:18
5.	"On a Misty Night" (Tadd Dameron)	7:02
6.	"Isn't This a Lovely Day?" (Irving Berlin)	6:38
7.	"Love for Sale" (Cole Porter)	6:31
8.	"Sideburns" (Bernstein)	8:12

== Personnel ==
- Peter Bernstein – guitar
- Brad Mehldau – piano
- John Webber – double bass
- Jimmy Cobb – drums
