= Mercedes Rossy =

Jazz Pianist

Mercedes Rossy (1961–1995) was a jazz pianist, composer and bandleader from Barcelona, Spain. Classically trained as a child, she began serious jazz studies in the early 1980s. Rossy moved to Munich in 1985, where she was active professionally for four years. In 1989, she received a scholarship to attend the Berklee College of Music in Boston, graduating in 1992. While at Berklee, she met Mark Turner and Steve Wilson, who joined her band and toured Europe with her. Rossy also performed with musicians Seamus Blake, Antonio Hart, Herb Harris, Leon Parker and Hal Crook.

In 1996 Mark Turner recorded The Music of Mercedes Rossy for the Fresh Sound label. Rossy's composition "The Newcomer" was also the title track of a 1997 George Colligan album on Steeplechase.

== Death ==
Rossy died on November 27, 1995, of intestinal cancer. Her brothers are drummer Jorge Rossy and bassist Mario Rossy.
