= Introducing Brad Mehldau =

Studio album by Brad Mehldau
- Released: 1995
- Recorded: March 13 and April 3, 1995
- Studio: Power Station (New York City)
- Genre: Jazz
- Length: 55:41
- Label: Warner Bros. 9362-45997-2
- Producer: Matt Pierson

Brad Mehldau chronology
Consenting Adults (1994)	Introducing Brad Mehldau (1995)	The Art of the Trio Volume One (1996)

Introducing Brad Mehldau is an album by pianist and composer Brad Mehldau, released on the Warner Bros. label in 1995.

== Background and reception ==
Professional ratings
Review scores
Source	Rating
AllMusic	4/5 stars
The Penguin Guide to Jazz	4/4 stars
The Rolling Stone Jazz & Blues Album Guide	3.5/5 stars

Mehldau in 2023, reflecting on the existence of two of his trios on the release, wrote: "What you hear is two records in one – my voice, I think, but mediated by all those great musicians who, by my lights, already had their own sound as well."

AllMusic awarded the album 4 stars and in its review by Scott Yanow, called it "a fine start to what should be a productive career".

== Track listing ==
All compositions by Brad Mehldau except as indicated

1. "It Might as Well Be Spring" (Oscar Hammerstein II, Richard Rodgers) - 7:46
2. "Countdown" (John Coltrane) - 4:12
3. "My Romance" (Rodgers, Lorenz Hart) - 6:23
4. "Angst" - 6:11
5. "Young Werther" - 7:11
6. "Prelude to a Kiss" (Duke Ellington) - 10:00
7. "London Blues" - 7:00
8. "From This Moment On" (Cole Porter) - 6:33
9. "Say Goodbye" - 9:25

== Personnel ==
Band

- Brad Mehldau - piano
- Larry Grenadier (tracks 1–5), Christian McBride (tracks 6–9) - bass
- Jorge Rossy (tracks 1–5), Brian Blade (tracks 6–9) - drums

Production

- Produced by Matt Pierson
- Engineered by James Farber
- Mastering by Greg Calbi
- Design by Rey International
- Art Direction by Greg Ross
- Production Coordination by Dana Watson
