= When I Fall in Love (Sacha Distel album) =

Studio album by Sacha Distel
- Released: 2003
- Genre: Jazz
- Label: Mercury Records

'When I Fall in Love is an album by Sacha Distel, released by Mercury Records in 2003 and features collaborations with Dionne Warwick and Liza Minnelli.

== Track listing ==
1. It Had To Be You (2:53)
2. The Good Life (feat. Dionne Warwick) (4:13)
3. I Only Have Eyes For You (2:55)
4. All The Way (feat. Liza Minnelli) (2:53)
5. My Funny Valentine (3:27)
6. When I Fall In Love (feat. Dionne Warwick) (3:45)
7. Mona Lisa (3:12)
8. What A Wonderful World (3:23)
9. But Beautiful (4:29)
10. Spell "Charme" (3:02)
11. Girl Talk (3:14)
12. Young And Foolish (3:26)
13. It's In The Eyes (Ecoutes Mes Yeux) (4:02)
14. L.O.V.E (2:48)
15. I Fall in Love Too Easily (2:20)
16. If We Could Stop Time (Si L'on Pouvait Arreter Le Temps) (feat. Dionne Warwick) (3:44)
17. Raindrops Keep Falling On My Head (2:53)
