= The Art of the Trio Volume One =

Studio album by Brad Mehldau
- Released: January 28, 1997
- Recorded: September 4–5, 1996
- Studio: Mad Hatter Studios (Los Angeles)
- Genre: Jazz
- Length: 56:03
- Label: Warner Bros. 9362-46260-2
- Producer: Matt Pierson

Brad Mehldau chronology
Introducing Brad Mehldau (1995)	The Art of the Trio Volume One (1997)	Marian McPartland's Piano Jazz with Brad Mehldau (1996)

The Art of the Trio Volume One is an album by American pianist and composer Brad Mehldau released on the Warner Bros. label in 1997.

== Reception ==
Professional ratings
Review scores
Source	Rating
AllMusic	3/5 stars
The Penguin Guide to Jazz Recordings	4/4 stars
The Rolling Stone Jazz & Blues Album Guide	4/5 stars

AllMusic awarded the album 3 stars and in its review by Scott Yanow stated: "At this point in time, pianist Brad Mehldau's style falls between Keith Jarrett and Bill Evans, being heavily influenced by the voicings of the latter and the free yet lyrical improvising of the former." The Penguin Guide to Jazz Recordings has listed the album as one of its "Core Collection" for fans of jazz music.

== Track listing ==
All compositions by Brad Mehldau except as indicated

1. "Blame It on My Youth" (Edward Heyman, Oscar Levant) – 6:17
2. "I Didn't Know What Time It Was" (Lorenz Hart, Richard Rodgers) – 6:30
3. "Ron's Place" – 6:29
4. "Blackbird" (John Lennon, Paul McCartney) – 5:00
5. "Lament for Linus" – 4:38
6. "Mignon's Song" – 6:34
7. "I Fall in Love Too Easily" (Sammy Cahn, Jule Styne) – 7:16
8. "Lucid" – 5:43
9. "Nobody Else but Me" (Oscar Hammerstein II, Jerome Kern) – 7:36

== Personnel ==
- Brad Mehldau – piano
- Larry Grenadier – bass
- Jorge Rossy – drums

== Credits ==
- Produced by Matt Pierson
- Engineered by James Farber
- Mastering by Greg Calbi
- Art direction and design by Rey International
- Production coordination by Dana Watson
- Photography by Andrea Marouk
- Band photographs by Ed Fox
