= Christopher Hollyday =

American musician

Robert Christopher Hollyday (born February 3, 1970) is an American jazz alto saxophonist.

== Biography ==
Hollyday was born in New Haven, Connecticut, on February 3, 1970. He began playing the saxophone at the age of nine. He grew up in a musical family, and his father listened to a lot of bebop. He has an older brother, Richard; together, they had gigs locally in Worcester, Massachusetts in their teens. He was strongly influenced by Charlie Parker. He released albums on his own label, Jazzbeat – Treaty in 1985 and Oh, Brother! the following year.

In 1988 Hollyday led a band at the Village Vanguard. He was listed among the 'young lions' of jazz, including Roy Hargrove, Wynton Marsalis and Marcus Roberts, who were playing earlier styles of jazz and receiving a lot of media attention. Hollyday played in Maynard Ferguson's big band in 1989. His first recording as leader was Christopher Hollyday in 1989, for RCA / Novus. In the same year, he played in the UK. For On Course, Hollyday wrote eight of the 10 tracks.

His playing was praised for its technical facility, but criticized for its lack of expression. After four albums for RCA/Novus, Hollyday "was starting to develop his own voice when he was dropped from the label."

Hollyday moved to San Diego in 1996, "and became the band director at Valley Center High School". He shifted more to private tuition around 2013, which also gave him more time for his own playing again. He released a new album, Telepathy, in 2018, and another, Dialogue, two years later.

== Discography ==
An asterisk (*) after the year indicates that it is the year of release.

=== As leader ===
Year recorded	Title	Label	Notes
1988	Reverence	RBI	Quartet, with Cedar Walton (piano), Ron Carter (bass), Billy Higgins (drums)
1989*	Christopher Hollyday	RCA / Novus	Quintet, with Wallace Roney (trumpet), Cedar Walton (piano), David Williams (bass), Billy Higgins (drums)
1990*	On Course	RCA / Novus	Quartet, with Larry Goldings (piano), John Lockwood (bass), Ron Savage (drums)
1991	The Natural Moment	RCA / Novus	Quartet, with Brad Mehldau (piano), John Webber (bass), Ron Savage (drums)
1992*	And I'll Sing Once More	RCA / Novus	With Scott Robinson (tenor sax, baritone sax, flute, clarinet), Earl Gardner (trumpet, flugelhorn), John Mosca, Ed Neumeister (trombone), Douglas Purviance (bass trombone), John Clark (French horn), Mark Feldman (violin), Kenny Werner (piano), Scott Colley (bass), Ron Savage (drums), Janey Haddad (talking drum, caxixi, Indian bells, frame drum), Eric Charry (tanpura)
2018*	Telepathy	Christopher Hollyday	Quintet, with Gilbert Castellanos (trumpet), Joshua White (piano), Rob Thorsen (bass), Tyler Kreutel (drums)
2020*	Dialogue	Christopher Hollyday	Quintet, with Gilbert Castellanos (trumpet), Joshua White (piano), Rob Thorsen (bass), Tyler Kreutel (drums)
