= Songs: The Art of the Trio Volume Three =

Studio album by Brad Mehldau
- Released: September 15, 1998
- Recorded: May 27 & 28, 1998
- Studio: Right Track (New York City)
- Genre: Jazz
- Length: 59:15
- Label: Warner Bros. 9362-47051-2
- Producer: Matt Pierson

Brad Mehldau chronology
Live at the Village Vanguard: The Art of the Trio Volume Two (1997)	Songs: The Art of the Trio Volume Three (1998)	Elegiac Cycle (1999)

Songs: The Art of the Trio Volume Three is an album by American pianist and composer Brad Mehldau released on the Warner Bros. label in 1998. It was produced by Matt Pierson.

== Reception ==
Professional ratings
Review scores
Source	Rating
AllMusic	4.5/5 stars
The Penguin Guide to Jazz	3.5/4 stars
The Rolling Stone Jazz & Blues Album Guide	4/5 stars

AllMusic awarded the album 4½ stars and in its review by Steve Huey, stated "this is a fine program easily recommended to straight-ahead collectors". For the New Statesman, Richard Cook wrote that "Songs enters the piano tradition without a murmur of protest while still offering music that is bursting loose of the accepted trinity of piano, bass and drums."

== Track listing ==
All compositions by Brad Mehldau except as indicated

1. "Song-Song" - 6:29
2. "Unrequited" - 6:07
3. "Bewitched, Bothered and Bewildered" (Lorenz Hart, Richard Rodgers) - 5:57
4. "Exit Music (For a Film)" (Radiohead) - 4:23
5. "At a Loss" - 6:19
6. "Convalescent" - 5:58
7. "For All We Know" (J. Fred Coots, Sam M. Lewis) - 7:59
8. "River Man" (Nick Drake) - 4:47
9. "Young at Heart" (Carolyn Leigh, Johnny Richards) - 6:20
10. "Sehnsucht" - 4:56

== Personnel ==
- Brad Mehldau – piano
- Larry Grenadier – double bass
- Jorge Rossy – drums

Production

- Matt Pierson – producer
- James Farber – engineering
- Greg Calbi – mastering
- Dana Watson – production coordination
- Tom Tavee – photography
- Art Direction and Design by Rey International
