= Live in Tokyo (Brad Mehldau album) =

Live album by Brad Mehldau
- Released: September 14, 2004
- Recorded: February 15, 2003
- Venue: Sumida Triphony Hall (Tokyo)
- Genre: Jazz
- Length: 70:36
- Label: Nonesuch; 7559-79853-2
- Producer: Brad Mehldau

Brad Mehldau chronology
Anything Goes (2002)	Live in Tokyo (2004)	House on Hill (2002–05)

Live in Tokyo is a live album by American pianist and composer Brad Mehldau released on the Nonesuch label in 2004.

== Reception ==
Professional ratings
Review scores
Source	Rating
AllMusic	4.5/5 stars
The Guardian	4/5 stars
The Penguin Guide to Jazz	3.5/4 stars
Sputnikmusic	4.2/5

The album received universally favourable reviews. AllMusic awarded the album 4½ stars and called it an "intense, cerebral, and beautiful album". The Guardian's John Fordham identifies it as "Another bold step on Mehldau's imperious way".

On All About Jazz, Doug Collete noted "Mehldau plays beautifully on his own, his work is florid with detail, yet never just flowery. There is a deeply felt passion in all he plays, and that's exactly why he is so engrossing to hear: in a solo setting Mehldau demonstrates how he selects his ideas altogether discriminatingly from what must be a veritable flood of variations that occur to him as he plays. It's not long into listening to Live in Tokyo that you are reminded how skillfully he runs the gamut of emotion in his playing".

JazzTimes reviewer, Harvey Siders commented "Few pianists can match Brad Mehldau when it comes to cross-fertilizing jazz, classical and rock. The same applies for technique, taste and intellectual curiosity. All of those qualities are on display in Mehldau's latest CD".

== Track listing ==
All compositions by Brad Mehldau except as indicated

Single Disc International Edition

1. "Things Behind the Sun" (Nick Drake) – 4:37
2. "Intro" – 2:42
3. "Someone to Watch Over Me" (George Gershwin, Ira Gershwin) – 9:55
4. "From This Moment On" (Cole Porter) – 7:55
5. "Monk's Dream" (Thelonious Monk) – 7:59
6. "Paranoid Android" (Colin Greenwood, Jonny Greenwood, Ed O'Brien, Phil Selway, Thom Yorke) – 19:29
7. "How Long Has This Been Going On?" (Gershwin, Gershwin) – 9:00
8. "River Man" (Drake) – 8:59

Two Disc Japanese Edition

Disc One:

1. "Intro" – 4:37
2. "50 Ways to Leave Your Lover" (Paul Simon) – 6:30
3. "My Heart Stood Still" (Lorenz Hart, Richard Rodgers) – 9:32
4. "Roses Blue" (Joni Mitchell) – 8:16
5. "Intro II" – 2:37
6. "Someone to Watch Over Me" (Gershwin, Gershwin) – 10:08
7. "Things Behind the Sun" (Drake) – 4:49

Disc Two:

1. "C Tune" – 5:52
2. "Waltz Tune" – 5:24
3. "From This Moment On" (Porter) – 7:57
4. "Alfie" (Burt Bacharach, Hal David) – 6:50
5. "Monk's Dream" (Monk) – 7:59
6. "Paranoid Android" (Greenwood, O'Brien, Yorke) – 19:29
7. "How Long Has This Been Going On?" (Gershwin, Gershwin) – 9:00
8. "River Man" (Drake) – 8:58

== Personnel ==
- Brad Mehldau – Piano

== Credits ==
- Produced by Brad Mehldau
- Recorded by Yoshihito Saegusa
- Mastering by Greg Calbi
- Design by Barbara de Wilde
- Photography by Michael Wilson and Ye Rin Mok
