= Anything Goes (Brad Mehldau album) =

Studio album by Brad Mehldau
- Released: February 24, 2004
- Recorded: October 8–9, 2002
- Studio: Avatar (New York City)
- Genre: Jazz
- Length: 62:59
- Label: Warner Bros.
- Producers: Matt Pierson, Brad Mehldau

Brad Mehldau chronology
Largo (2002)	Anything Goes (2002)	Live in Tokyo (2003)

Professional ratings
Review scores
Source	Rating
AllMusic	4/5 stars
The Guardian	5/5 stars
Now	2/5 Ns
The Penguin Guide to Jazz	4/4 stars
Pitchfork	7.8/10
Tom Hull	B+

Anything Goes is a contemporary jazz album by the Brad Mehldau trio. The title track is Cole Porter's "Anything Goes" arranged for the trio. The album, like many of Mehldau's other albums, contains several jazz arrangements of pop/rock songs, including "Still Crazy After All These Years" by Paul Simon, and "Everything in Its Right Place" by Radiohead.

== Reception ==
Tim Perlich of Now stated, "Jazz pianist Brad Mehldau has never been much of a risk-taker, preferring instead to straddle the thin line that divides the progressively minded traditionalists and the conservative modernists. On the disappointing Anything Goes, Mehldau surrenders to his commercial impulses and adopts the clichéd contemporary pop-jazz album formula." John Fordham of The Guardian wrote, "As before, it's a mix of standards, quirkily personal choices and a Radiohead theme, but Anything Goes is likely to rank very high in the Mehldau trio list." Matt Collar of AllMusic commented, " Anything Goes moves from the expected to the inspired and that alone makes this worth a listen."

== Track listing ==
1. "Get Happy" (Harold Arlen, Ted Koehler) – 9:47
2. "Dreamsville" (Raymond B. Evans, Jay Livingston, Henry Mancini) – 5:03
3. "Anything Goes" (Cole Porter) – 7:08
4. "Tres Palabras" (Osvaldo Farrés) – 5:01
5. "Skippy" (Thelonious Monk) – 5:24
6. "Nearness of You" (Hoagy Carmichael, Ned Washington) – 6:43
7. "Still Crazy After All These Years" (Paul Simon) – 5:21
8. "Everything in Its Right Place" (Thom Yorke, Jonny Greenwood) – 6:55
9. "Smile" (Charlie Chaplin, Geoff Parsons, James John Turner Phillips) – 6:48
10. "I've Grown Accustomed to Her Face" (Alan Jay Lerner, Frederick Loewe) – 4:49

== Personnel ==
- Brad Mehldau – Piano
- Larry Grenadier – Bass
- Jorge Rossy – Drums

== Credits ==
- Produced by Brad Mehldau and Matt Pierson
- Mastered by Greg Calbi
- Engineered by James Farber, Steve Mazur, Aya Takemura
- Photography by Warren Darius Aftahi
- Production Coordination by Dana Watson
