= Places (Brad Mehldau album) =

Studio album by Brad Mehldau
- Released: September 5, 2000
- Recorded: January 24 & 25 and March 24 & 25, 2000
- Studio: Mad Hatter Studio (Los Angeles)
- Genre: Jazz
- Length: 69:23
- Label: Warner Bros. 9362-47693-2
- Producer: Brad Mehldau

Brad Mehldau chronology
Art of the Trio 4: Back at the Vanguard (1999)	Places (2000)	Progression: The Art of the Trio, Vol. 5 (2000)

Places is an album by Brad Mehldau, released on the Warner Bros. label in 2000.

== Background ==
Mehldau described the influence of James Joyce's Ulysses on the album being "cyclical in design, with a theme that began the record and returned at the ending, just as Odysseus's journey was a circular one in which he eventually arrived home".

== Reception ==
Professional ratings
Review scores
Source	Rating
AllMusic	4.5/5 stars
The Penguin Guide to Jazz	3/4 stars
Sputnikmusic	3.8/5

AllMusic awarded the album 4½ stars and in its review by Richard S. Ginell, stated "the album is about the constancy of his personality and musical language, taking all of your personal mental baggage with you wherever you travel. This is an important album, one that anyone interested in piano jazz ought to check out". On All About Jazz, David Adler noted "Each piece is named for a particular place (hence the title), which Mehldau attempts to represent in musical terms. In short, Places is a concept album, and a particularly effective one. For the most part, Mehldau holds his prodigious chops in check, preferring instead to conjure moods and memories with subtle nuances". JazzTimes reviewer, Bill Shoemaker commented "In addition to being a technically dazzling pianist, Mehldau has an arch sense of nuance; by changing the touch of a single note or introducing a single beat's rest in a long serpentine line, Mehldau can turn a smile or a frown upside down".

== Track listing ==
All compositions by Brad Mehldau.

1. "Los Angeles" - 5:21
2. "29 Palms" - 5:09
3. "Madrid" - 6:07
4. "Amsterdam" - 3:38
5. "Los Angeles II" - 5:18
6. "West Hartford" - 5:39
7. "Airport Sadness" - 4:48
8. "Perugia" - 3:52
9. "A Walk in the Park" - 5:59
10. "Paris" - 6:30
11. "Schloss Elmau" - 6:32
12. "Am Zauberberg" - 7:07
13. "Los Angeles (Reprise)" - 3:28

== Personnel ==
- Brad Mehldau - piano
- Larry Grenadier - bass (tracks 1, 3, 6, 9, 11 and 13)
- Jorge Rossy - drums (tracks 1, 3, 6, 9, 11 and 13)

== Credits ==
- Produced by Brad Mehldau
- Engineered by Bernie Kirsch
- Mastering by Andrew Garver
- Art direction and design by Lawrence Azerrad
- Photography by Michael Lewis
