= Elegiac Cycle =

Studio album by Brad Mehldau
- Released: June 8, 1999
- Recorded: February 1–2, 1999
- Studio: Mad Hatter Studios (Los Angeles)
- Genre: Jazz, post-romanticism
- Length: 56:47
- Label: Warner Bros. 9362-47357-2
- Producer: Brad Mehldau, Michael Davenport

Brad Mehldau chronology
Songs: The Art of the Trio Volume Three (1998)	Elegiac Cycle (1999)	Art of the Trio 4: Back at the Vanguard (1999)

Professional ratings
Review scores
Source	Rating
Allmusic	4.5/5 stars
The Penguin Guide to Jazz	3/4 stars
Sputnikmusic	4.4/5

Elegiac Cycle is a solo piano album by Brad Mehldau. It was issued in 1999 by Warner Bros. produced by Mehldau himself.

== Background and music ==
Mehldau described the influence of James Joyce's Ulysses on the album being "cyclical in design, with a theme that began the record and returned at the ending, just as Odysseus's journey was a circular one in which he eventually arrived home". He also mentioned Joyce's use of Latin translated into English in the novel as an inspiration for a musical effect in "Memory's Tricks": "I silently depressed the notes of its meoldic motif with one hand, and with them held down, improvised other lines with the other hand, allowing the motif to peak out in the sympathetic vibrations that arose from the soundboard."

== French edition ==
In 2011, the French publisher Outre Mesure released in both English and French the complete transcription note for note of Elegiac Cycle, and some musical commentaries by Philippe André, the original manuscript “lead sheets” of Brad Mehldau and a long and recent interview by Ludovic Florin about the genesis of the record and where the musician stands with it now.

== Track listing ==
All pieces composed by Brad Mehldau

1. "Bard" 2:45
2. "Resignation" 5:34
3. "Memory's Tricks" 9:17
4. "Elegy for William Burroughs and Allen Ginsberg" 4:43
5. "Lament for Linus" 1:27
6. "Trailer Park Ghost" 9:19
7. "Goodbye Storyteller (for Fred Myrow)" 10:27
8. "Rückblick" 8:56
9. "The Bard Returns" 4:16

== Personnel ==
Primary artist

- Brad Mehldau - piano, producer, liner notes

Production

- Lawrence Azerrad – art direction, design
- Alisha Chamberlain – assistant engineer
- Michael Davenport – executive producer, management
- Alan Yoshida – mastering
- John Clark – photography
- Bernie Kirsch – recording
