= Jorge Rossy =

Spanish jazz musician

Jorge "Jordi" Rossy (born August 21, 1964) is a Spanish jazz drummer, pianist and vibraphonist.

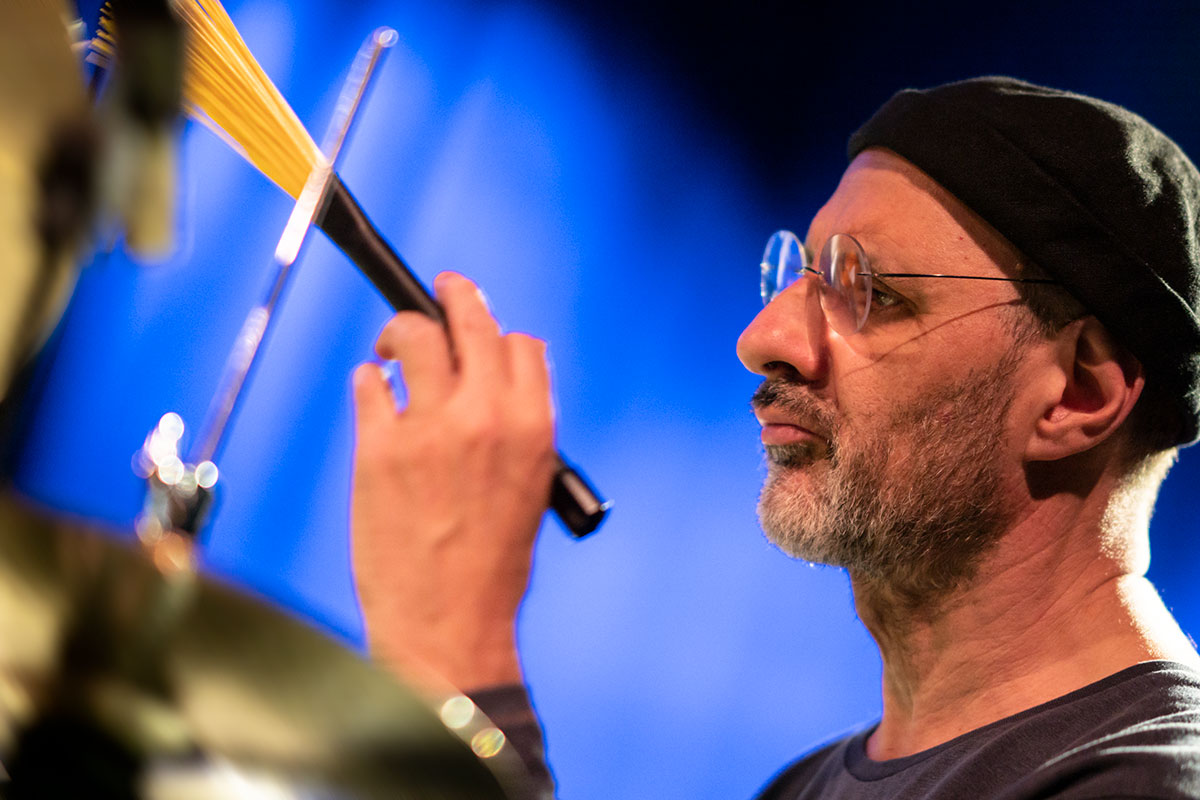
Aarhus, Denmark 2020 Photo Hreinn Gudlaugsson

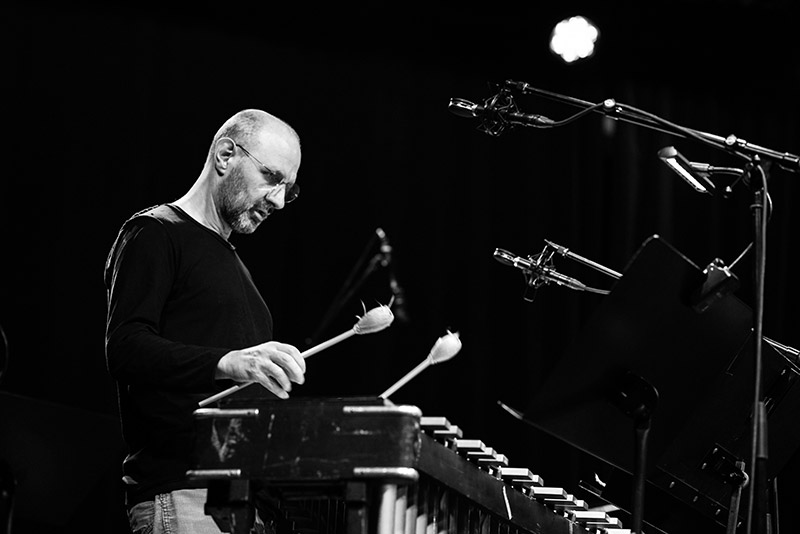
Rossy as vibraphonist playing in Aarhus Denmark 2018

== Early life ==
Rossy was born in Barcelona.

His father, Mario, played the piano that was in the family home, as did Jorge's sister, Mercedes. Jorge started playing percussion at the age of 11, and was given a drum set a year later. When he was 14, he got a cheap vibraphone, which he practised on for two years. He then took up the trumpet, initially to improve his musical listening ability.

== Later life and career ==
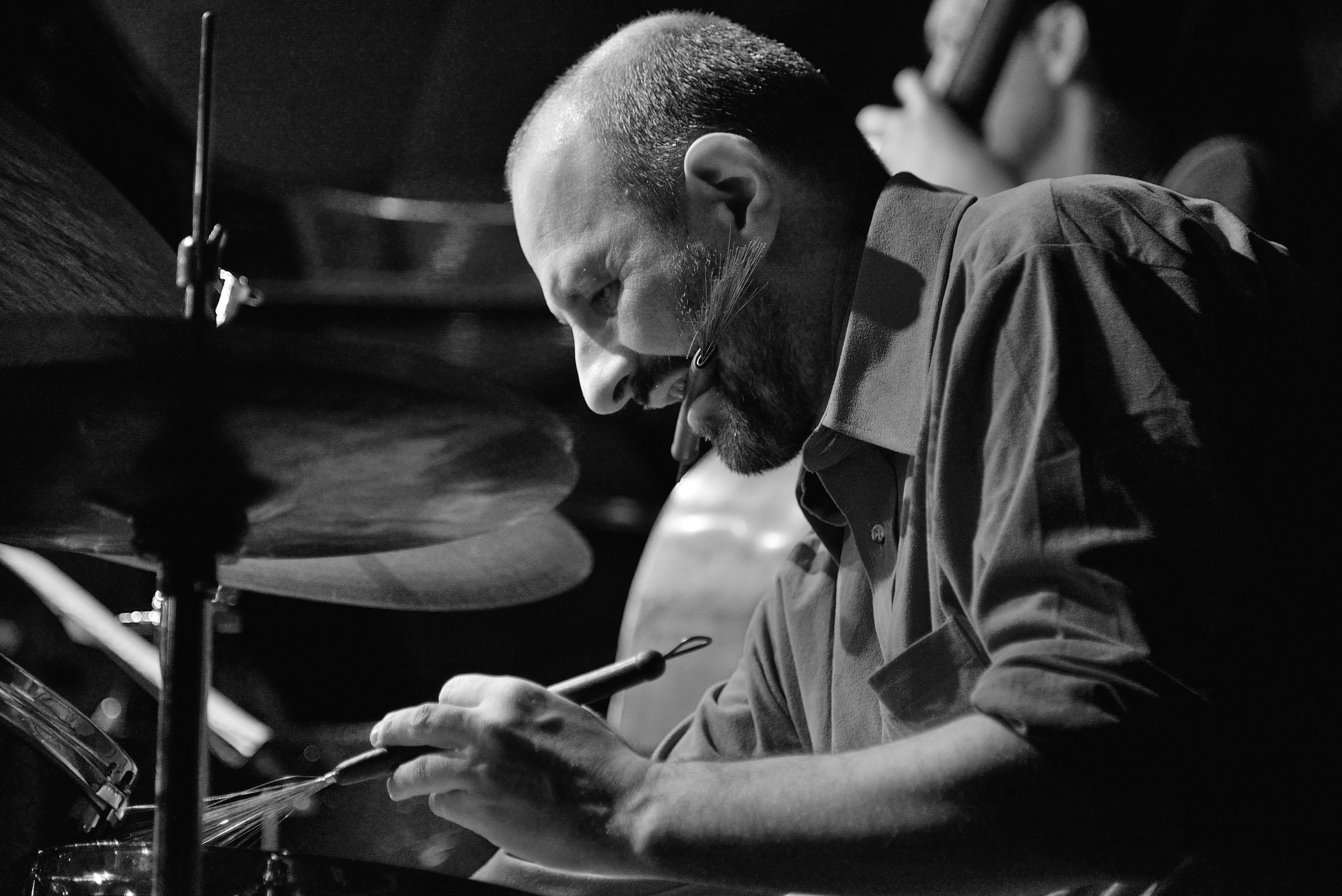
Rossy as drummer

Between 1980 and 1989, Rossy toured and recorded extensively with several musicians in the Spanish jazz scene, as well as with internationally acclaimed artists such as Woody Shaw, Kenny Wheeler, Jack Walrath, David Schnitter, Sal Nistico, Sean Levitt, and others.

In 1989, he moved to Boston to study trumpet at Berklee College of Music, but within two years switched to concentrating on drums. In Boston, Rossy became the drummer of choice for many of his peers, and joined the Danilo Perez Trio for gigs in Panama, France, Boston and New York. He subsequently joined the Paquito D'Rivera Sextet for two years.

In 1991, Rossy left Berklee and moved to New York City with his wife, the singer María de Angelis. He played on several early recordings of many of his Boston contemporaries, including Mark Turner, Chris Cheek, Seamus Blake, Kurt Rosenwinkel. He also accompanied several other musicians then living in New York, including Brad Mehldau, Ethan Iverson, Reid Anderson, Avishai Cohen, Joe Martin, and Freddie Bryant.

In 1995, Rossy started touring and recording extensively with the Brad Mehldau Trio. He has also toured and recorded with The Bloom Daddies, an electric band composed of Chris Cheek, Seamus Blake, Jesse Murphy and two drummers, Rossy and, initially, Dan Reiser, but subsequently with Tony Mason. Rossy has also worked and recorded with Joshua Redman, Bill McHenry, Bruce Barth, Mike Kanan, Ben Monder, Nat Su, Steve Wilson, Mark Johnson, Larry Grenadier, and Ben Street.

Rossy moved back to Barcelona in 2000, to raise his family and to shift his focus to piano. Since then, he has been playing and recording on piano with the Jordi Matas Quintet and the Joe Smith Septet, and has participated in several projects with Guillermo Klein, including performances at Merkin Hall in New York and at the Library of Congress Auditorium in Washington, DC.

In 2006, Rossy recorded his first album as leader, with Albert Sanz on Hammond organ and R J Miller on drums. His second album, featured the same rhythm section but added Chris Cheek on saxophone and his son Felix Rossy on trumpet.

As a pianist, Rossy has toured Spain, the United States, Morocco, Italy and Basel, Switzerland. Rossy has continued to support other musicians on drums, including the Lee Konitz and Ethan Iverson quartet, Charlie Haden's Quartet West and Land of the Sun Septet, Carla Bley's Liberation Orchestra, Joe Lovano’s Quartet Europa, the Kurt Rosenwinkel Quintet, the Seamus Blake Quartet, Trio 2000 with Chick Corea and Niels-Henning Ørsted Pedersen, and another trio with Brad Mehldau and Charlie Haden. His first recording playing the vibes was Stay There, with saxophonist Mark Turner, guitarist Peter Bernstein, bassist Doug Weiss, and drummer Al Foster.

== Discography ==
=== As leader/co-leader ===
- Wicca (Fresh Sounds Records, 2007)
- Ivlianus Suite (ContraBaix /Karonte, 2010)
- Iri's Blues (Moskito Records, 2012)
- Gershwin (Swit Records, 2015)
- Stay There (Pirouet, 2015)
- Beyond Sunday (Jazz & People, 2018)
- Puerta (ECM, 2021)
- Luna (Fresh Sound New Talent, 2023)

=== As sideman ===
With Brad Mehldau

- New York-Barcelona Crossing, Volumen 1 (Fresh Sound New Talent, 1993)
- New York-Barcelona Crossing, Volumen 2 (Fresh Sound New Talent, 1993)
- When I Fall in Love (Fresh Sound New Talent, 1993)
- Introducing Brad Mehldau (Warner Bros., 1995)
- The Art of the Trio Volume One (Warner Bros., 1997)
- Live at the Village Vanguard: The Art of the Trio Volume Two (Warner Bros., 1998)
- Songs: The Art of the Trio Volume Three (Warner Bros., 1998)
- Art of the Trio 4: Back at the Vanguard (Warner Bros., 1999)
- Places (Warner Bros., 2000)
- Progression: The Art of the Trio, Vol. 5 (Warner Bros., 2001)
- Largo (Warner Bros., 2002)
- Anything Goes (Warner Bros., 2004)
- House on Hill (Nonesuch, 2006)

With Chris Cheek

- I wish I knew (Fresh Sound, 1997)
- A girl named Joe (Fresh Sound, 1997)
- Vine (Fresh Sound, 1999)
- Live at Jamboree: Guilty (Fresh Sound, 2002)
- Live at Jamboree: Lazy Afternoon (Fresh Sound, 2002)
- Blues Cruise (Fresh Sound, 2005)
- Saturday Songs (Sunnyside, 2017)

With The Bloomdaddies

- Mosh for lovers (1995)
- Racer X (2002)

With Avishai Cohen

- Adama (Stretch, 1997)

With Paquito D'Rivera

- Havana Cafe (Chesky Records, 1992)

With Dan Faulk

- Spirits in the Night (Fresh Sound, 1996)

With Ethan Iverson

- Costumes Are Mandatory (HighNote, 2012) with Lee Konitz and Larry Grenadier

With Mark Turner

- In This World (Warner Bros., 1998)

With Kurt Rosenwinkel

- East Coast Love Affair (Fresh Sound, 1996)
