= Perico Sambeat =

Spanish jazz saxophonist

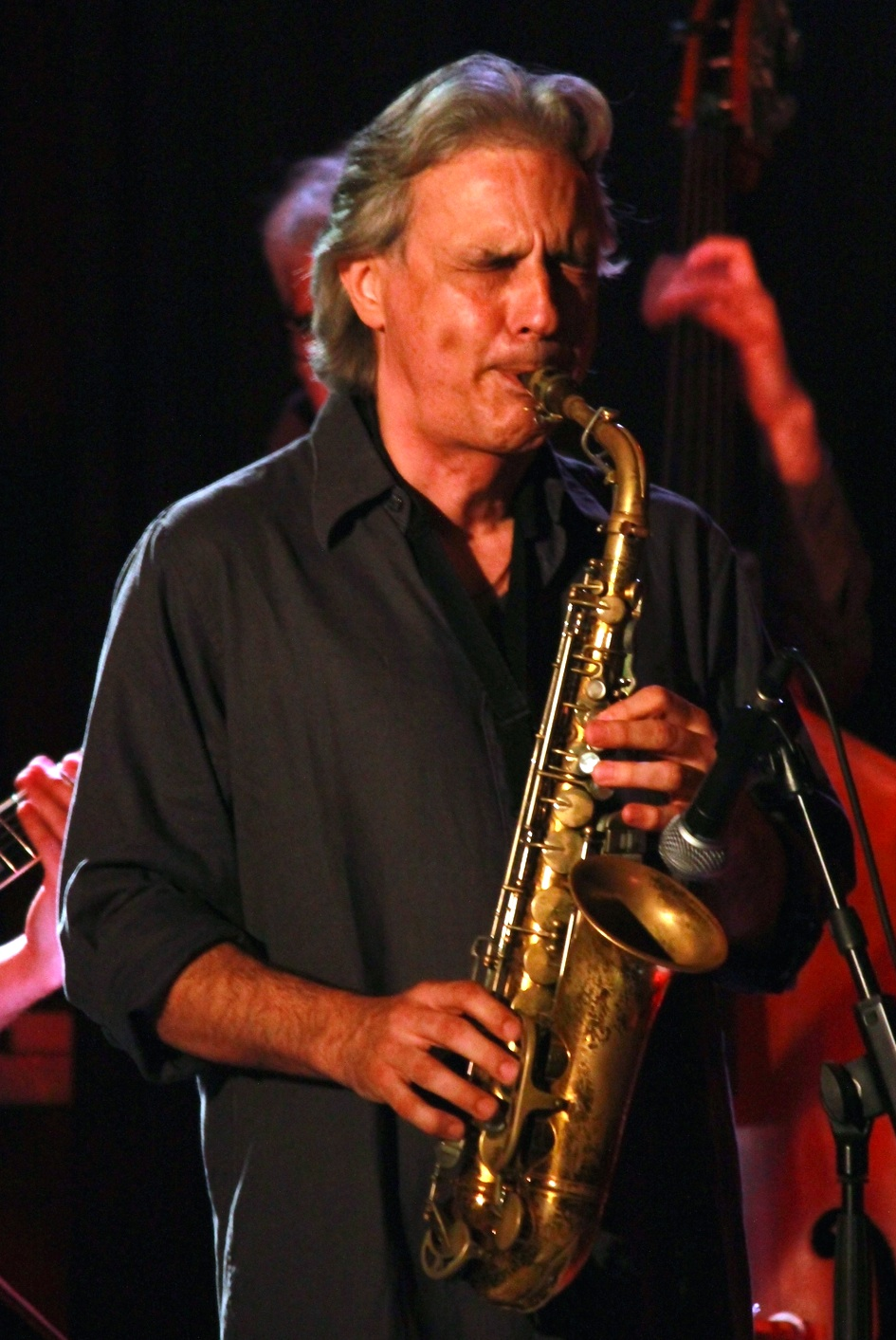
- Perico Sambeat, 2012

Background information
- Born: Valencia, Spain
- Genres: Jazz
- Occupation: Musician
- Instrument: Saxophone
- Label: Fresh Sound

Perico Sambeat (born 23 July 1962) is a Spanish jazz saxophonist.

Initially training as a classical flute player, Sambeat began playing the saxophone in 1980. In 1982, he moved to Barcelona and started to concentrate on the saxophone full-time. He has been a professor at Berklee's campus in Valencia, Spain since 2013.

Reviewing his album Friendship, John Fordham of The Guardian described Sambeat as "an artist of imposing character within a straightish postbop context".

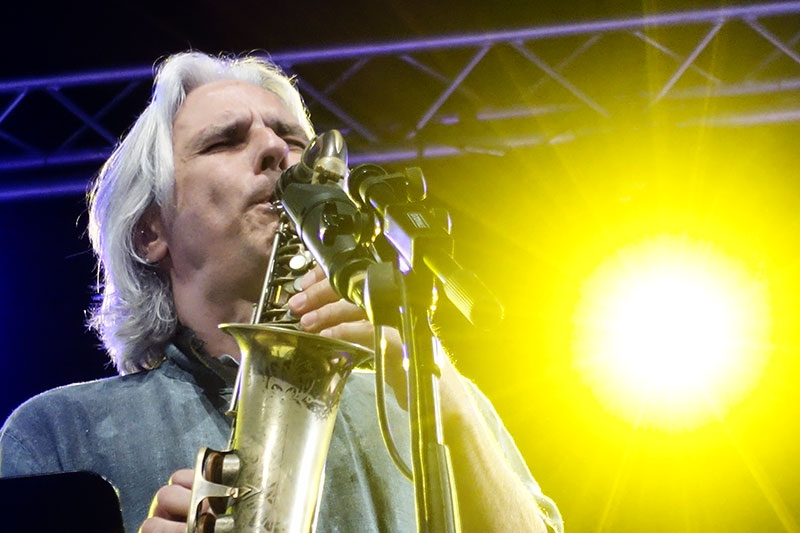
Perico Sambeat at Aarhus Jazz Festival, 2016

== Discography ==
- Perico Sambeat LP (EGT, 1991)
- Uptown Dance (EGT, 1992)
- Dual Force (Ronnie Scott's Jazz House, 1996)
- Jindungo (Fresh Sound, 1997)
- Ademuz (Fresh Sound, 1998)
- Some Other Spring (Satchmo, 1999)
- Perico (Lola/Chrysalis/EMI Spain, 2001)
- Jazz Viene Del Sur Cruce de Caminos (Resistencia, 2001)
- Passages (Resistencia, 2002)
- Friendship (ACT, 2003)
- Colina Miralta Sambeat Trio (Contrabaix/Karonte, 2007)
- Flamenco Big Band (Verve, 2008)
- Andando (Contrabaix, 2009)
- Infinita (Fresh Sound, 2009)
- Barcelona Hora Cero (Ayva, 2010)
- Baladas (Contrabaix, 2011)
- Sketches of Pangea (Budapest Music Center, 2011)
- Elastic (Karonte/(Contrabaix, 2012)
- Plays Zappa (Karonte, 2016)
- Ofrenda (Karonte 2019)
- CMS 15 años (Karonte 2022)
- Atlantis (Karonte 2022)
- Roneando (Karonte 2023)
- Boreal (CARA, 2025)
