= Brad Mehldau =

American jazz musician (born 1970)

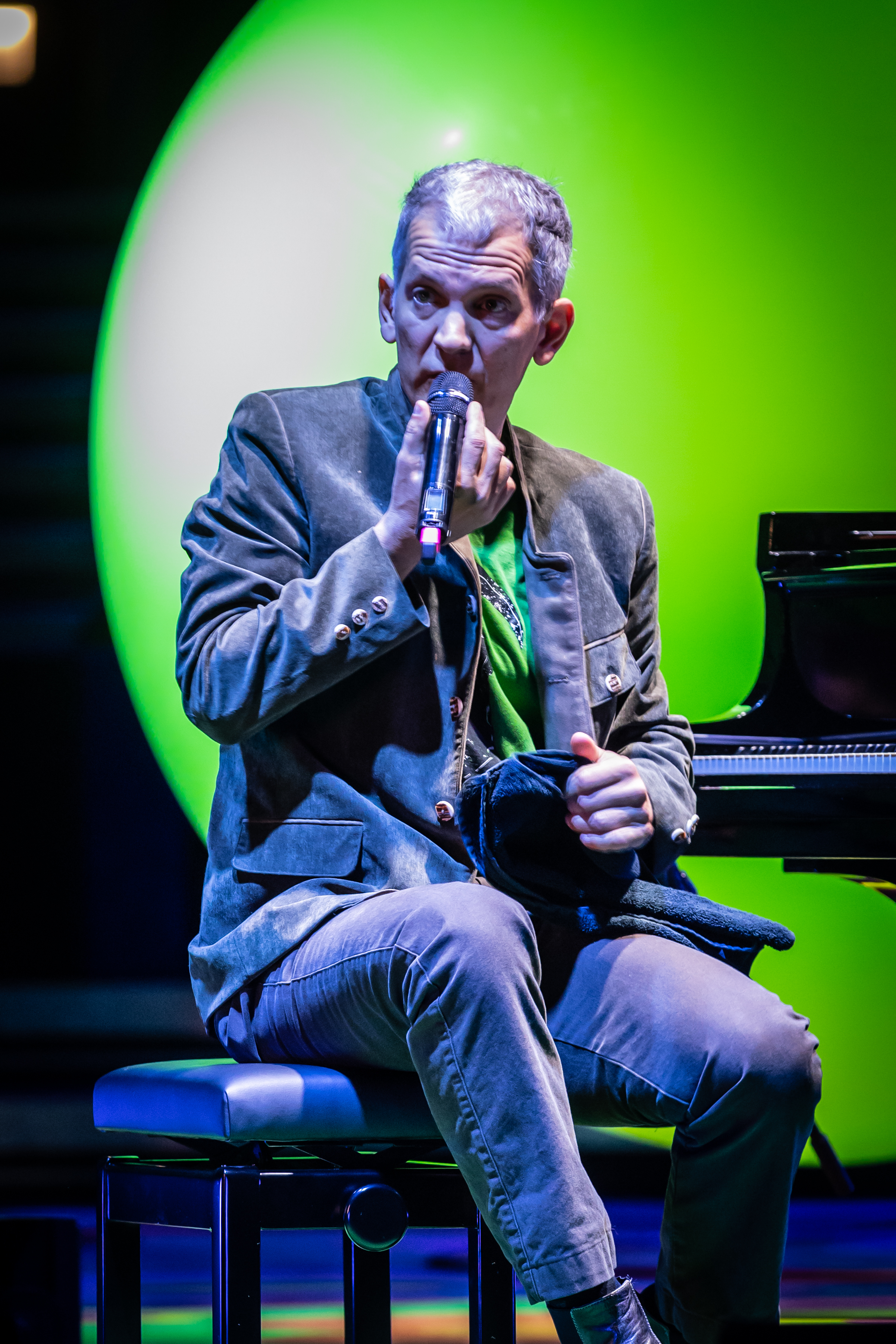
- Mehldau in 2021

Background information
- Born: Bradford Alexander Mehldau; August 23, 1970 (age 56); Jacksonville, Florida, U.S.
- Genres: Jazz, post-bop
- Occupations: Musician; Composer; Arranger
- Instrument: Piano
- Years active: Late 1980s–present
- Labels: Warner Bros.; Nonesuch
- Website: bradmehldaumusic.com

Bradford Alexander Mehldau (/ˈmɛldaʊ/; born August 23, 1970) is an American jazz pianist, composer, and arranger.

Mehldau studied music at The New School, touring and recording while still a student. He was a member of saxophonist Joshua Redman's quartet in the mid-1990s, and has led his own trio since the early 1990s. His first long-term trio featured bassist Larry Grenadier and drummer Jorge Rossy; in 2005 Jeff Ballard replaced Rossy. These bands have released more than a dozen albums under the pianist's name.

Since the early 2000s, Mehldau has experimented with other musical formats in addition to trio and solo piano. Largo, released in 2002, contains electronics and input from rock and classical musicians. Later examples include: touring and recording with guitarist Pat Metheny; writing and playing song cycles for classical singers Renée Fleming, Anne Sofie von Otter, and Ian Bostridge; composing orchestral pieces for 2009's Highway Rider; and playing electronic keyboard instruments in a duo with drummer Mark Guiliana.

Aspects of pop, rock, and classical music, including German Romanticism, have been absorbed into Mehldau's writing and playing. Through his use of some traditional elements of jazz without being restricted by them, simultaneous playing of different melodies in separate hands, and incorporation of pop and rock pieces, Mehldau has influenced musicians in and beyond jazz in their approaches to writing, playing, and choice of repertoire.

== Early life ==
Mehldau was born on August 23, 1970, in Jacksonville, Florida. His adoptive family was father Craig Mehldau, an ophthalmologist, mother Annette, a homemaker, and sister Leigh Anne, who became a social worker. The family moved from Roswell, Georgia, to Bedford, New Hampshire, in 1975. There was always a piano in the house during Mehldau's childhood, and he initially listened to pop and rock music on the radio. His family moved to West Hartford, Connecticut, when Mehldau was 10. Up to this point he had played mostly simple pop tunes and exercises from books, but the move brought him a new piano teacher, who introduced him to classical music. This new interest lasted for a few years, but by the age of 14 he was listening more to jazz, including recordings by saxophonist John Coltrane and pianist Oscar Peterson. As his interest in jazz developed, a friend gave Mehldau Keith Jarrett's solo album Bremen/Lausanne. Mehldau later recalled that the recording expanded his sense of what was possible on the piano and that he connected with Jarrett's playing through his classical background.

Mehldau attended William H. Hall High School and played in its concert jazz band. While at high school, he began transcribing jazz solos from recordings, to improve his listening skills and gain insights into improvisation. From the age of 15 until he graduated from high school he had a weekly gig at a local club, and performed for weddings and other parties, often with fellow Hall student Joel Frahm. In his junior year at the school Mehldau won Berklee College of Music's Best All Round Musician Award for school students. Mehldau described himself as being, up to this point, "a white, upper-middle-class kid who lived in a pretty homogenized environment".

After graduating, Mehldau moved to New York City in 1988 to study jazz and contemporary music at The New School, on a partial scholarship. He studied under pianists Fred Hersch, Junior Mance and Kenny Werner, and drummer Jimmy Cobb. In 1989, Mehldau was a member of saxophonist Christopher Hollyday's band that toured for several months; as a result of playing so often with one group, Mehldau was able to assimilate the music of Wynton Kelly and McCoy Tyner, his two principal influences on piano up to that point, and began to develop his own sound. Before the age of 20, Mehldau also had gigs in Cobb's band, along with fellow student Peter Bernstein on guitar.

== Later life and career ==
=== 1991–1998 ===
Mehldau's first recording was for Hollyday's The Natural Moment in 1991; his first tour of Europe was also with the saxophonist during the same year. Mehldau's interest in classical music returned when he was in his early twenties, and spurred him into developing his left-hand playing technique. He led his own trio from at least 1992, when he played at New York's Village Gate. Mehldau also played as sideman with other musicians around this time. His performances with saxophonist Perico Sambeat included a tour of Europe early in 1993, and Mehldau's first released recordings as co-leader, from a May concert in Barcelona. Mehldau toured for 18 months with saxophonist Joshua Redman. The association with Redman began in 1993, but they had played together for a short period the previous year. Redman and his band attracted attention, with their 1994 album Moodswing also aiding Mehldau's profile. They also played together for the soundtrack to the film Vanya on 42nd Street (1994), for which Redman wrote the music.

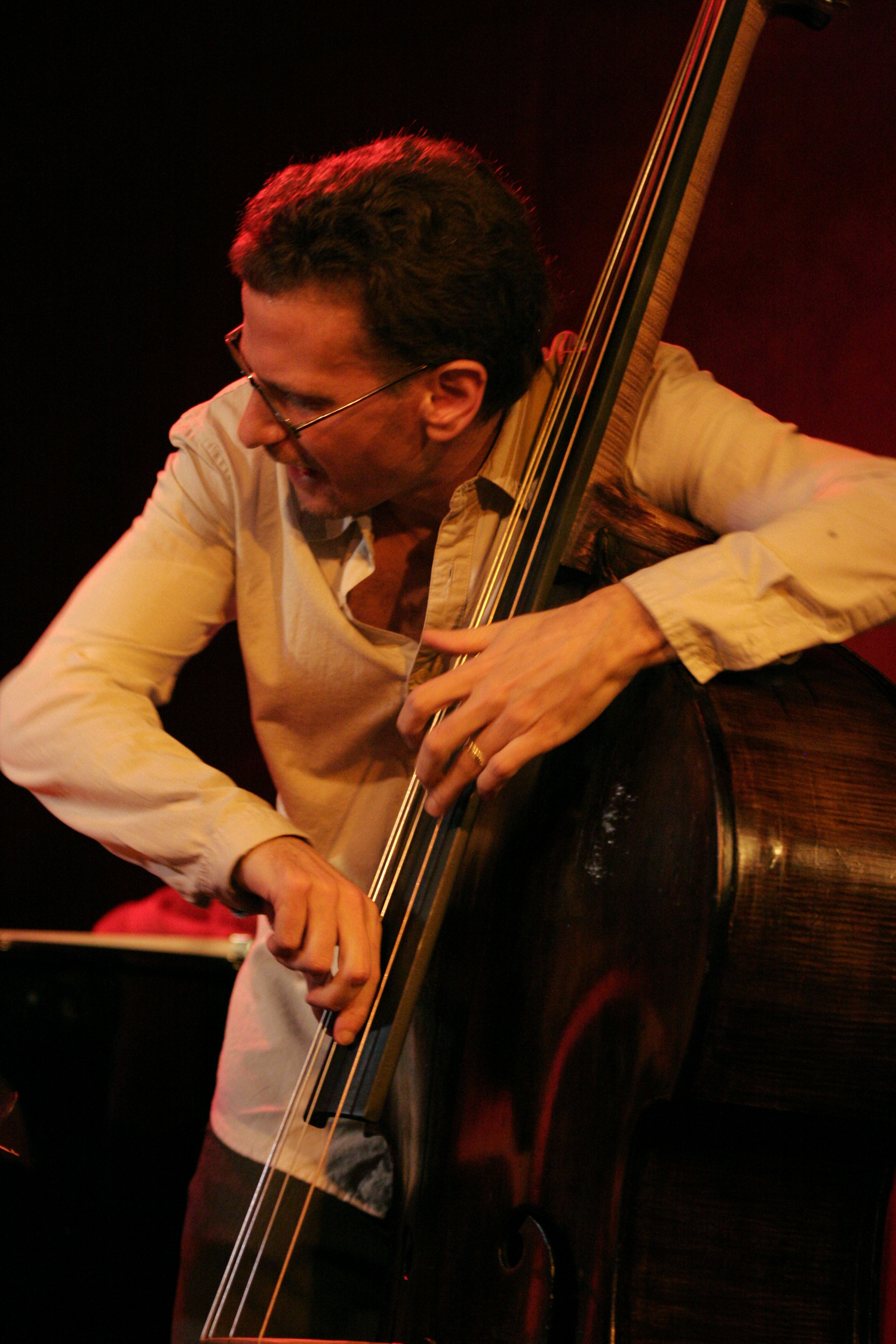
Long-term collaborator Larry Grenadier, photographed in 2009

Mehldau graduated from The New School in 1993. He formed his first long-term trio in 1994, with bassist Larry Grenadier and drummer Jorge Rossy. In the following year, Mehldau recorded Introducing Brad Mehldau for Warner Bros., his first album as sole leader. It was well received, with The Penguin Guide to Jazz commenting that "it's as if he were aware of jazz tradition but entirely unencumbered by it." His second album for Warner Bros., The Art of the Trio Volume One, was recorded in 1996 and was widely praised by critics. The title was selected by producer Matt Pierson as one that would attract attention and help to build a brand.

By the mid- to late 1990s, Mehldau was regarded by some as one of the leading jazz musicians of the day: Guardian critic John Fordham described him as "the next great keyboard star of jazz". The appreciation was not universal: some of the pianist's self-penned liner notes and interview comments, which included philosophical musings and complaints about comparisons with pianist Bill Evans, engendered dislike in some, thereby, in critic Nate Chinen's words, "leaving Mehldau with a lingering reputation for pretentiousness and self-indulgence." Many critics did, though, reassess their judgment of his main influences, which previously had often been given as Evans, an assessment that was perhaps attributable more to race than to music. Another, non-musical, similarity with Evans that was commented on was Mehldau's struggle with an addiction to heroin during the 1990s, up to 1998. Around 1996 he moved to Los Angeles, to try to overcome his problem with drugs. Mehldau later stated: "Once I stopped using heroin, it was like a rush of creativity that had been held in check came out".

In 1996, Mehldau made the first of several recordings with saxophonist Lee Konitz and bassist Charlie Haden. Mehldau's contributions to film music continued in 1997, with an accompanist role for some of the tracks recorded for Midnight in the Garden of Good and Evil. His series of trio albums also continued, employing some of the traditional elements of jazz while not conforming to or being restricted by its norms. Live at the Village Vanguard: The Art of the Trio Volume Two consisted entirely of standards, and was recorded at a series of 1997 concerts at the Village Vanguard, and released the following year. The title again attracted attention, as concert recordings from the same club had been issued by some of the biggest names in jazz, including Evans, and saxophonists Coltrane and Sonny Rollins. The studio album Songs: The Art of the Trio Volume Three followed later in 1998, and contained Mehldau originals, standards, plus Nick Drake's "River Man", and Radiohead's "Exit Music (For a Film)". This album was chosen by Fordham as his jazz CD of the year. "[Although it] might seem to some a little introverted, and certainly distinctly classical in flavor", he wrote, "the intricacy and counter-melodic richness of a great pianist is astonishingly balanced against the more direct and open eloquence a great vocalist might bring."

Mehldau became established on the international jazz festival scene in the mid- to late 1990s, having played at events such as the Montreal International Jazz Festival and the Montreux Jazz Festival in 1997, and the North Sea Jazz Festival in 1998. Also in 1998, the pianist reunited with Redman for the saxophonist's Timeless Tales (For Changing Times), and played on country artist Willie Nelson's Teatro. That summer, Mehldau spent a few months in Germany, developing his interest in its language, literature, and music.

=== 1999–2004 ===
Mehldau's interest in figures of 19th century German Romanticism, including Brahms, Schubert, and Schumann, influenced his first solo piano release, Elegiac Cycle, which was recorded in 1999 and broke the sequence of trio recordings under his name. Art of the Trio 4: Back at the Vanguard was recorded and released in the same year, presenting more performances from the Village Vanguard. The recording features standards, Mehldau originals, Miles Davis' "Solar", and another version of "Exit Music (For a Film)". Also in 1999, Mehldau was pianist for two albums by saxophonist Charles Lloyd. In the following year, Places, an album containing both Mehldau solo piano pieces and trio performances, was released. All of the tracks were Mehldau originals, and were based on his experiences of visiting and revisiting various locations worldwide. Progression: The Art of the Trio, Vol. 5, the final album in that series, was another concert recording from the Village Vanguard, and was recorded in 2000 and released in 2001. Looking back on his earlier career, Mehldau commented in 2005 that "The trio created my identity". In the three or four years up to the end of 2001, his trio had toured for the majority of each year.

In 2001 Mehldau expanded from playing on film soundtracks, which had included The Million Dollar Hotel and Space Cowboys, to scoring, with the French film Ma femme est une actrice. In the same year, he left Los Angeles. He first played with saxophonist Wayne Shorter that year, and recorded the Grammy Award-winning Alegría with him a couple of years later.

While trio performances and recordings continued, Mehldau began in the early to mid-2000s to broaden the musical settings in which he appeared as leader. An early instance was his 2002 album Largo, which was Mehldau's first departure from piano solo or trio albums. It was produced by Jon Brion, whom Mehldau had met at a California club that hosted weekly happenings. On the album, in addition to Mehldau's usual trio, rock musicians and instruments associated more with classical music were employed, as were experiments with prepared piano and "multiple layers of electronically enhanced sound". As of 2010, this was reported to be Mehldau's best-selling album.

The results of two further days of recording in 2002 were split over two trio albums: Anything Goes, released in 2004, contained performances of compositions by others; the Mehldau originals were released two years later on House on Hill. A solo piano recording from a 2003 concert, Live in Tokyo, showed greater lyricism appearing in Mehldau's playing, and was released in 2004 as his first album for Nonesuch Records, an imprint of Warner Bros. In the summer of 2004 he toured Europe for three weeks with a band that included guitarist Kurt Rosenwinkel and Redman. That autumn, Mehldau formed a quartet, with Mark Turner on saxophones, Grenadier on bass, and Jeff Ballard on drums.

=== 2005–2019 ===
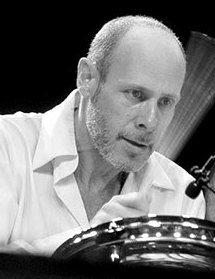
Jeff Ballard, drummer in Mehldau's trio from 2005

In 2005 Ballard replaced Rossy as the drummer in Mehldau's trio. This, in the view of critic Ray Comiskey, did not radically change the trio's sound, but it did give them "a harder edge and pushed Mehldau more, with bassist Larry Grenadier left more in a fulcrum role, the centre around which piano and drums cavort." Another critic, Ben Ratliff, suggested that the new trio's sound was "denser and more tumultuous", with rhythms more overt than with the previous trio. In February 2005 Mehldau performed in Hong Kong for the first time, with his new trio. Their first album, Day Is Done, was recorded the following month.

Mehldau continued to expand beyond trio and solo playing. In the spring of 2005 he premiered a song cycle that he had written for classical music singer Renée Fleming. This association was based on a commission from Carnegie Hall; their 2006 recording contained music set to poems by Rainer Maria Rilke and Louise Bogan. Mehldau also collaborated with guitarist Pat Metheny from 2005 – they recorded two albums together that year, along with Grenadier and Ballard, and in 2007 went on a worldwide tour.

Another Village Vanguard recording, Brad Mehldau Trio Live, was recorded in 2006 and released two years later. This also contained a variety of sources of material, including "Wonderwall" by rock band Oasis, "Black Hole Sun" by grunge band Soundgarden, and Chico Buarque's samba "O Que Será"; "it's business as usual – state-of-the-art contemporary jazz piano", commented Fordham. A further recording from 2006 was released as Live in Marciac in 2011; this contained two CDs and one DVD of a solo concert by the pianist. Mehldau asserted that his third solo recording "is the beginning of a freer approach, [...] and maybe [contains] more ease and fluidity in a musical texture with several simultaneous voices". In 2006 Mehldau also played on saxophonist Michael Brecker's final album, Pilgrimage.

In March 2007 Mehldau first performed his piano concerto "The Brady Bunch Variations for Piano and Orchestra", with the Orchestre national d'Île-de-France at the Théâtre du Châtelet in Paris. Later that decade, Carnegie Hall awarded Mehldau another commission – to write the song cycle Love Songs for singer Anne Sofie von Otter; they premiered it together in 2009 and recorded the songs the following year. In 2009 Mehldau began a two-year period as curator of London's Wigmore Hall jazz series, which included a performance with von Otter in the second year.

In 2009 Mehldau also recorded Highway Rider, an album that combined his usual trio with guest musicians and a 28-piece orchestra. Again based compositionally on the theme of travel or a journey, the album was produced by Brion, and, in critic Mike Hobart's description, "probes the confluence of the arbitrary and non-arbitrary in music, of balancing what is committed to the page with improvisation." This was pursued further in the winter of 2010–11, in public performances of pieces from the album in the US and Europe. Mehldau's trio returned to the studio for the first time in several years in 2008 and again in 2011, resulting in Ode, an album of the pianist's originals, and Where Do You Start, an album of covers. DownBeat reviewer Jim Macnie commented that, on the former album, "More than ever, Mehldau uses his instrument as a drum, popping staccato notes into the maw of the rhythm section's formidable bustle."

During 2010–11 Mehldau held Carnegie Hall's Richard and Barbara Debs Composer's Chair, the first jazz musician to do so. He also played and recorded piano duets with Kevin Hays. This collaboration was on arrangements by Patrick Zimmerli, with whom Mehldau had attended high school. One piece from their album, Modern Music, featured the pianists playing a composed left-hand part while improvising with the other hand; "to do both at once is a real test. The brain feels like it's split in half", commented Mehldau. Also in 2011 Mehldau toured with von Otter again, had piano–mandolin duets with Chris Thile, and played a series of duet concerts with Redman in Europe, six pieces from which were released five years later on the album Nearness. In 2012 Mehldau and the Orpheus Chamber Orchestra performed his "Variations for Piano and Orchestra on a Melancholy Theme" in Europe. The piece was originally for solo piano, but was converted by Mehldau for a commission by the Orchestra; it was performed in the US the following year.

In 2013 Mehldau began touring with drummer Mark Guiliana as a synthesizer-oriented duo that was given the portmanteau name "Mehliana". Their playing was largely improvised, and distantly influenced by dub, drum 'n' bass, electro, and funk. They released an album, Mehliana: Taming the Dragon, in February 2014. Late in 2015, a collection of solo piano recordings from Mehldau's concerts in Europe in the 2004–14 period was released, entitled 10 Years Solo Live. Another trio recording with Grenadier and Ballard, Blues and Ballads, was recorded in 2012 and 2014 and was released in 2016. Also in 2016, Mehldau and Guiliana formed a trio with guitarist John Scofield; they played in the United States before touring Europe.

Mehldau's interest in classical music continued with commissions by several concert halls to write pieces that were inspired by Johann Sebastian Bach compositions; he played these and the Bach originals in solo performances during 2015. They were the origins of his solo piano album After Bach, which was recorded in 2017 and released the following year. This release was followed by Seymour Reads the Constitution!, another trio album with Grenadier and Ballard, later that year. His next album, released in 2019, was Finding Gabriel, which "comprises nine thematically related songs by Mehldau and features performances by him on piano, synthesizers, percussion, and Fender Rhodes, as well as vocal." In the same year, Mehldau performed another of his commissioned song cycles at Wigmore Hall, this time with Ian Bostridge.

=== 2020–present ===
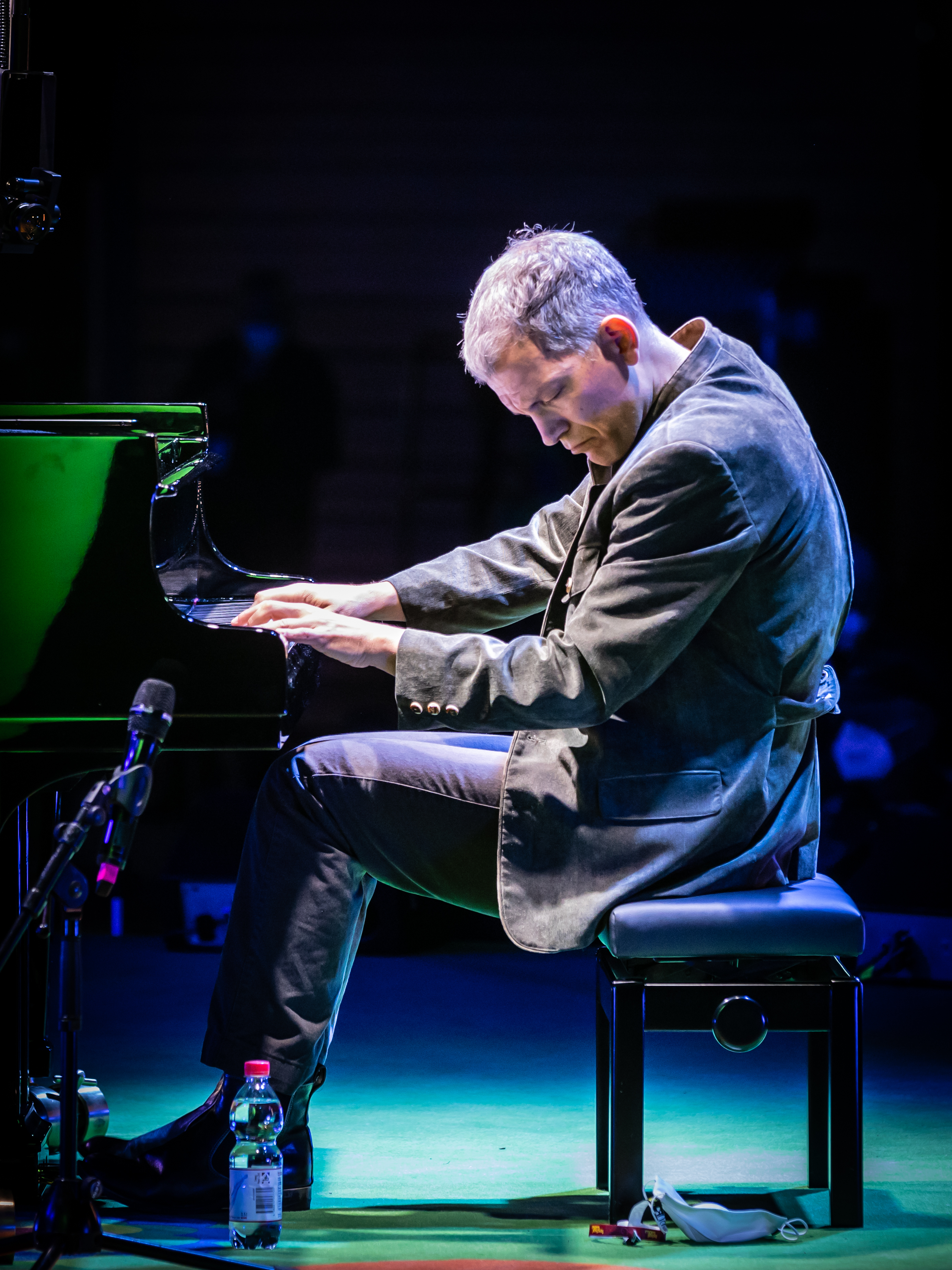
Mehldau in 2021

Mehldau recorded two solo piano albums in 2020: Suite: April 2020, a studio album consisting of original pieces inspired by the COVID-19 pandemic as well as covers of songs by Neil Young, Billy Joel, and Jerome Kern, and a live album, Your Mother Should Know: Brad Mehldau Plays The Beatles, featuring 10 songs by The Beatles and an encore by David Bowie.

Jacob's Ladder, an album that explored the progressive rock musical influences of Mehldau's youth, was recorded in 2020 and 2021 and released in 2022. He later commented that the album was made when he was going through "a breakdown. It's all there – the descent, the way through and the way out." That same year, he recorded his song cycle The Folly of Desire with Ian Bostridge, for the Pentatone label. A memoir covering his early life, Formation: Building a Personal Canon, Part 1, was published by Equinox Press in 2023.

A pair of solo piano albums in the mold of After Bach were completed in 2023, featuring his own compositions in dialog with those of European classical composers: After Bach II and Après Fauré. The quintet album Solid Jackson, with Mark Turner and Peter Bernstein, was also recorded that year for the Criss Cross Jazz label. Ride into the Sun, an album with compositions by or inspired by singer-songwriter Elliott Smith, and featuring a chamber orchestra and various guests performers, was recorded in 2025 and nominated for a Grammy Award for Best Alternative Jazz Album.

== Influences and artistry ==
Mehldau cites pianists Larry Goldings (for "his full approach to the instrument") and Hays (for adding alternative harmonies to the set ones) as well as guitarist Bernstein (for showing the value of playing melodic phrases instead of just rehearsed patterns) as direct influences on his own playing, in addition to David Sánchez (for rhythmic feel), Jesse Davis, Kurt Rosenwinkel, Mark Turner, and the other members of his own trio. He has stated that Hersch was his biggest influence as a player of solo piano. He has also questioned the patrilineal emphasis of critical discussions of influence, pointing out that he has been significantly influenced by listening to and playing with such peers as Bill Charlap, Danilo Pérez, and Ethan Iverson.

Mehldau has expressed an interest in, and knowledge of, philosophy and literature. In a 2003 interview he commented on romanticism and nostalgia, linking pleasure and pain to musical expression:

I love the part of the Orpheus myth where he is allowed to take his wife out of Hades on the condition that he doesn't look back at her for the trip on the river Styx. When he can't help himself, he looks back, and she is pulled back downstream away from him, taken away forever. Music is that moment right when he looks at her: seeing something that you love for an instant being taken away forever. There's an element of folly to the whole thing – you look even though you know you shouldn't. Music kind of yokes together the feeling of attainment and the feeling of loss at the same time.

In Stuart Nicholson's words, "Mehldau's art is not based on negotiating his way through a harmonic sequence with a string of bravura licks [...] Instead he patiently weaves melodic developments from motifs, fragments and inversions of the [...] songs he plays into the fabric of his extemporizations, making the tunes gradually assume the proportions of an alternative composition." Fordham stated that "Mehldau demonstrates immense attention to detail, control of dynamics, and patience in developing an improvisation's shape over a longer span than the chorus-structure of a popular song."

Mehldau often plays a separate melody with each hand, and one of the central features of his music is the playing of improvised counterpoint. He stated in 2002 that some of the content of his playing is affected by the music that he has recently been listening to: "If I'm digging a Brahms intermezzo that'll find its way in. If it's McCoy Tyner, there'll be more of that." Mehldau's performances often employ unusual rhythmic meters; for example, he plays his arrangement of "All the Things You Are" on Art of the Trio 4 in 7/4 time, and "I Didn't Know What Time It Was" on Art of the Trio 1 in 5/4. He developed this ability over a period of around a year, with the help of Rossy. Mehldau is able to reach tenth and eleventh intervals on the piano.

== Compositions ==
Fordham described Mehldau's compositions as "miniature tapestries of taut lyricism and surprising turns". Mehldau himself indicated that some of his compositions address a specific need, such as integrating a particular rhythm into his trio, while others emerge from something he has played while improvising. In the latter case, Mehldau likened the difficulty of the composition process to that of a game of chess: "The opening is always easy for me, the middle gets more difficult, more of an intellectual process, more trial and error at work, and the end is always difficult for me." These struggles to find satisfactory endings stem from the tension between needing to close a piece and his desire to leave a sense of open-endedness – "an escape duct of possibility".

== Personal life ==
Mehldau is married to Dutch jazz vocalist Fleurine, with whom he has recorded and toured. They met in 1997, and have three children. The eldest is a daughter who was born in 2001. Mehldau stated early in 2006 that family responsibilities meant that he was making shorter tours. As of 2010, he divided his non-touring time between living in Amsterdam and New York City; this remained the case until he let the lease on the Upper West Side property lapse during the COVID-19 lockdowns.

== Influence ==
Mehldau's trio was, in Hobart's words, "the first successfully to add post-Beatles pop into the jazz repertoire without trivialising either", and shifted the "traditional emphasis on bravura technique and group dynamics [...] to a focus on subtleties of touch and where-my-fancy-takes-me musings." Such differences in repertoire and approach became common in small-group jazz. His combining of right- and left-hand playing, moving away from the more typical right-hand dominated playing, also influenced pianists. Further influences on pianists are his "bittersweet left-hand melodies, clusters of dense mid-range chords and ability to conjoin the angularity of [Thelonious] Monk with classical romance".

In 2013 Chinen stated that "Mehldau is the most influential jazz pianist of the last 20 years". Pianist Ethan Iverson, a contemporary of Mehldau's, stated that Mehldau was the principal influence on his peers, beginning in the late 1990s. Pianist Gerald Clayton (born 1984) summarized Mehldau's importance in a 2013 interview: "He brought in a new feel and sound in jazz. I don't know a single modern pianist who hasn't taken something from Brad. I told him that I should be arrested for all the stuff I've stolen from him." Redman said in 2010 that Largo had been particularly important to musicians: "Brad has had a lot of influential records, [...but] if you talk to musicians, especially younger musicians, so many of them will name that as a defining record." Marco Benevento and Aaron Parks are among the improvisers who have been affected by the 2002 album.

== Awards and nominations ==
Mehldau won DownBeat's Readers Poll piano award in 1999, 2000, 2002, 2004, 2007, 2011, and 2012. He was the 2006 winner of the Miles Davis Prize, awarded by the Montreal International Jazz Festival for "jazz artists who have made significant artistic and innovative contributions to the genre".

In 2015 Mehldau received the Wigmore Medal, which "recognises significant figures in the international music world who have a strong association with the Wigmore Hall."

Mehldau has been nominated for several Grammy Awards. He was nominated for Best Jazz Instrumental Solo on "Blame It on My Youth" from The Art of the Trio Volume One in 1998, Best Jazz Instrumental Performance, Individual or Group for Art of the Trio 4: Back at the Vanguard in 2000, Best Jazz Instrumental Album, Individual or Group for Brad Mehldau Trio Live in 2009, Best Improvised Jazz Solo for the title track of Ode in 2013, and Best Improvised Jazz Solo for "Sleeping Giant" from Mehliana: Taming the Dragon in 2015. He received two further nominations at the end of 2016: for Best Improvised Jazz Solo on "I Concentrate on You" from Blues and Ballads; and for Best Jazz Instrumental Album for the duo album Nearness, with Redman. At the end of 2018, Seymour Reads The Constitution! was nominated for Best Jazz Instrumental album, and "De-Dah" from that album was nominated for Best Improvised Jazz Solo. Finding Gabriel won Best Jazz Instrumental Album in 2020.

Year	Result	Award	Category	Work
1998	Nominated	Grammy Award	Best Jazz Instrumental Solo	"Blame It On My Youth" in The Art of the Trio Volume One
1999	Won	DownBeat Readers Poll	Piano	
2000	Nominated	Grammy Award	Best Jazz Instrumental Performance, Individual or Group	Art of the Trio 4: Back at the Vanguard
2000	Won	DownBeat Readers Poll	Piano	
2002	Won	DownBeat' Readers Poll	Piano	
2004	Won	DownBeat Readers Poll	Piano	
2006	Won	Montreal International Jazz Festival / Awards	Miles Davis Award	
2007	Won	DownBeat Readers Poll	Best album of the year	Metheny/Mehldau with Pat Metheny
2007	Won	DownBeat Readers Poll	Piano	
2009	Nominated	Grammy Award	Best Jazz Instrumental Album, Individual or Group	Brad Mehldau Trio Live
2011	Won	DownBeat Readers Poll	Best album of the year	Live in Marciac
2011	Won	DownBeat Readers Poll	Piano	
2012	Won	DownBeat Readers Poll	Piano	
2013	Nominated	Grammy Award	Best Improvised Jazz Solo	"Ode" in Ode
2015	Nominated	Grammy Award	Best Improvised Jazz Solo	"Sleeping Giant" in Mehliana: Taming the Dragon with Mark Guiliana
2017	Nominated	Grammy Award	Best Jazz Instrumental Album	Nearness with Joshua Redman
2017	Nominated	Grammy Award	Best Improvised Jazz Solo	"I Concentrate On You" in Nearness
2019	Nominated	Grammy Award	Best Jazz Instrumental Album	Seymour Reads the Constitution!
2019	Nominated	Grammy Award	Best Improvised Jazz Solo	"De-Dah" in Seymour Reads the Constitution!
2020	Won	Grammy Award	Best Jazz Instrumental Album	Finding Gabriel
2021	Nominated	Grammy Award	Best Jazz Instrumental Album	Joshua Redman – RoundAgain
2023	Nominated	Grammy Award	Best Jazz Instrumental Album	LongGone with Joshua Redman, Christian McBride, and Brian Blade
2026	Nominated	Grammy Award	Best Alternative Jazz Album	Ride into the Sun
