= Our Secret World =

Studio album by Kurt Rosenwinkel
- Released: September 7, 2010
- Recorded: September 7–9, 2009
- Studio: Boom Studios, Porto, Portugal
- Genre: Jazz
- Length: 66:10
- Label: Wommusic
- Producer: Kurt Rosenwinkel, Pedro Guedes

Kurt Rosenwinkel chronology
Reflections (2009)	Our Secret World (2010)	Star of Jupiter (2012)

Our Secret World is Kurt Rosenwinkel's ninth album as a band leader. It is a collaboration with the Orchestra de Jazz Matosinhos from Portugal. The project was begun in 2007 and was performed in 2008. Recording took place over three days in September 2009. This was preceded by three days of twelve-hour rehearsals.

All of the selections are by Rosenwinkel and have been a part of his songbook since the 1990s. "Dream of the Old" appeared on The Enemies of Energy. "Path of the Heart", "Zhivago", and "Use of Light" appeared on The Next Step. "Our Secret World" was on Heartcore. "The Cloister" was on Deep Song. "Turns", though an old composition, debuts on this album.

== Track listing ==
All songs by Kurt Rosenwinkel

1. "Our Secret World" – 6:34
2. "The Cloister" – 9:18
3. "Zhivago" – 8:45
4. "Dream of the Old" – 11:34
5. "Turns" – 6:38
6. "Use of Light" – 10:10
7. "Path of the Heart" – 13:08

== Personnel ==
- Kurt Rosenwinkel – guitar, vocals
- Jose Luis Rego – alto and soprano saxophones, clarinet
- Joao Pedro Brandao – alto and soprano saxophones, clarinet, flute
- Joao Mortagua – alto and soprano saxophones
- Nuno Pinto – clarinet
- Mario Santos – tenor saxophone, clarinet
- Jose Pedro Coelho – tenor saxophone, flute
- Rui Teixeira – baritone saxophone, bass clarinet
- Nick Marchione – trumpet
- Erick Poirrier – trumpet
- Susana Santos Silva – trumpet, flugelhorn
- Rogerio Ribeiro – trumpet
- Jose Silva – trumpet
- Michael Joussein – trombone
- Alvaro Pinto – trombone
- Daniel Dias – trombone
- Goncalo Dias – trombone
- Abe Rabade – piano
- Carlos Azevedo – piano, arranger, conductor
- Demian Cabaud – double bass
- Marcos Cavaleiro – drums
- Ohad Talmor – arranger
- Pedro Guedes – arranger and conductor
