= The News (album) =

Studio album by Andrew Cyrille
- Released: August 27, 2021
- Recorded: August 2019
- Studio: Sound on Sound Studios; New Jersey
- Genre: Jazz
- Label: ECM 2681
- Producer: Sun Chung

Andrew Cyrille chronology
Lebroba (2018)	The News (2021)	2 Blues for Cecil (2022)

The News is an album by the Andrew Cyrille Quartet recorded on August 2019 and released through ECM on August 27, 2021. The quartet features guitarist Bill Frisell, David Virelles on synthesizer and piano, and bassist Ben Street—the same lineup as 2016's The Declaration of Musical Independence with the exception of Virelles, a last-minute replacement for Richard Teitelbaum, who was suffering from health problems at the time of the recording session, and who died in 2020.

== Background ==
Cyrille had previously recorded "With You in Mind" for Low Blue Flame with Greg Osby, and for Us Free: Fish Stories with Henry Grimes, and Bill McHenry. The title track previously appeared on his 1978 album The Loop, and features unique sounds produced by a snare drum covered with a newspaper and played with brushes.

== Reception ==
Professional ratings
Review scores
Source	Rating
AllMusic	4/5 stars
All About Jazz	3.5/5 stars
The Guardian	4/5 stars
Jazz Journal	5/5 stars
Jazzwise	4/5 stars
Financial Times	4/5 stars
Tom Hull – on the Web	B

In a review for DownBeat, Ed Enright stated that the album "further cements [Cyrille's] legacy as a premier force in jazz improvisation over a span of some six decades," and commented: "You... feel the group's warm, wide-open, all-enveloping instrumental sound, and the music comes across as deliberate and free, never rushed."

Mike Hobart, writing for the Financial Times, awarded the album 4 stars, and remarked: "Cyrille continues to adapt his polyrhythmic grasp of time, space and pulse to the demands of free jazz and structured composition alike."

In an article for AllMusic, Thom Jurek wrote: "The News is a master class in the less-is-more approach to drumming as well as ensemble play. Brilliant."

Writing for The Guardian, John Fordham commented: "Cyrille has learned all about jazz's rich complexities – and then sought to distil them into ever simpler essentials in projects of his own... Cyrille's hidden-hand presence is glimpsed in taps, ticks and quietly crisp cymbal grooves, hushed snare rolls and offbeat accents—and the whisper of brushes on a newspaper spread over the drumheads on the title track... Quiet, this News may be—but it's right up there among ECM Records' entrancing understatements."

Ian Patterson, in an article for All About Jazz, called the album "a quietly seductive offering of real charm and deceptive depth," and wrote: "Cyrille is the dynamo that drives this quartet with his less-is-more vocabulary. His embrace of space, his nuanced choices of texture, tone and weight of pulse draw only the essential from Frisell, Street and Virelles. Not one note or sound from this most intuitive of quartets seems excessive."

In a review for JazzTimes, Jackson Sinnenberg remarked: "Although they may at times evoke chaos, Cyrille and his group cohere better than ever. The News is a true quartet record, one that allows each musician's sound, compositional style, and sense of the world to shine through."

Writing for Jazz Journal, Andy Hamilton referred to the album as "a very fine release," and commented: "The pianist and guitarist understand how to keep out of each other’s way, though to describe the album as a series of trio episodes, as one writer does, is an exaggeration. Frisell and Virelles offer a sympathetic lyricism that floats over the drummer’s often lightly enunciated but always beautiful time."

Jon Turney of London Jazz News noted: "Cyrille plays with a kind of uninhibited restraint. His constantly shifting, needle sharp backdrop imparts a feeling he could do anything at any time, but what he chooses is always perfectly judged," and called the album "a quietly brilliant set... Late work from an old master, and a record to pass to any drummers you may come across who could do with learning that less is more."

At Jazzwise, Kevin Le Gendre wrote: "Andrew Cyrille may be seen first and foremost as an avant-garde legend whose career has many historic moments... yet he is also a master storyteller beyond genre definitions. Cyrille's often painterly textural invention has always been outstanding, and here he shows a consummate command of low tempo on daringly spacious, sparse material where he chooses every strike of snare or crash of ride cymbal with the utmost care, as if the notes were punctuation in a letter or exclamation marks in an intimate conversation."

Nick Lea, in a review for Jazz Views, stated that the album "demonstrates a continuing quest in the creation and developing of musical relationships," and commented that, in relation to The Declaration of Musical Independence, on The News "the quartet find new ways of working together, building on what has been learned and past experiences. The resulting music works in a far less abstract manner than the earlier set, more tightly focussed and with a lyricism that flows throughout."

The News was included in 2021 end-of-year "Best Jazz Albums" lists at PopMatters, Treble Zine, and Glide Magazine.

== Track listing ==
1. "Mountain" (Frisell) - 8:25
2. "Leaving East of Java" (Adegoke Steve Colson) - 8:49
3. "Go Happy Lucky" (Frisell) - 5:21
4. "The News" (Cyrille) - 5:34
5. "Incienso" (Virelles) - 5:35
6. "Baby" (Frisell) - 5:34
7. "Dance of the Nuances" (Cyrille, Virelles) - 7:24
8. "With You in Mind" (Cyrille) - 7:11

== Personnel ==
=== Andrew Cyrille Quartet ===
- Andrew Cyrille – drums, percussion
- Bill Frisell – guitar
- David Virelles - synthesizer, piano
- Ben Street - bass

== Production ==
- Sun Chung – producer
- Rick Kwan – recording engineer
