= Deep Song =

Deep Song may refer to:

- Deep Song (album), Kurt Rosenwinkel, 2005
- Deep Song (ballet), Martha Graham, 1937
- Cante jondo 'deep song', a vocal style in flamenco

== See also ==
- Poema del cante jondo 'Poem of the Deep Song', a poem by Federico García Lorca
- Deep image, a poetic style inspired by Lorca
