= Ravid Kahalani =

Israeli musician

Background information
- Born: Israel
- Genres: World music; Middle Eastern music; funk; jazz
- Occupation: Musician
- Instruments: Vocals; gimbri; percussion
- Years active: 2000s–present
- Member of: Yemen Blues
- Formerly of: Idan Raichel Project
- Website: Yemen Blues official website

Ravid Kahalani is an Israeli musician primarily known as the founder and leader of the band Yemen Blues.

== Biography ==
Kahalani was born in Israel to a family of Yemenite Jews who had fled persecution in Yemen. He grew up in Elon Moreh. His family attended a Yemenite synagogue and he studied briefly with a Yemenite rabbi. After dropping out of school at 15, he began experimenting with drugs. At 20, realizing that he was "going to end up a druggie at the central bus station or dead" if he continued, he moved to Tel Aviv, and worked as a cook and actor while studying dance and music. He has cited Stevie Wonder and Prince as early musical influences.

== Early career ==
After meeting Idan Raichel in Tel Aviv, Kahalani performed with the Idan Raichel Project from the mid-2000s until 2008. He was a member of the international Miško Plavi Band, formed in 2003 and led by Serbian multi-instrumentalist Miško Plavi. Kahalani also performed with Yisrael Borochov of the East-West Ensemble.

== Yemen Blues ==
Kahalani founded Yemen Blues with bassist Omer Avital in 2008. After two years of writing and rehearsing music between New York City and Tel Aviv, their band included Rony Iwryn, Itamar Doari, Itamar Borochov, Avi Lebovich, Hadar Noiberg, Hila Epstein, and Galia Hai. They played their first performance in Marseille in 2010.

Yemen Blues performed at Le Poisson Rouge In New York City in 2011. "The music held modernized traces of ancient Yemenite chants that Mr. Kahalani sang as a boy, while infused with Middle-Eastern and African sensibilities," reported Evangeline Kim for World Music Central.

In 2014, Yemen Blues toured India. The Indian Express reported, "A Yemenite Jew who now lives in Israel (Yeminite Jews aren't accepted in Yemen), [Kahalani's] music — [blending] ancient synogogue chants from the Torah with jazz, funk, rock and blues — is sneaking into spaces where geo-politics and diplomacy have failed to go." A 2014 report by The Vancouver Observer remarked that Kahalani had performed at the Vancouver Chutzpah! performing arts festival for four years in a row.

Their 2016 album, Insaniya, was produced by Bill Laswell.

In 2019, Yemen Blues toured in support of songs based on the Hebrew prayer Hallel. The 2019 band lineup included Kahalani, Yemeni oud player Ahmed Al-Shaiba, Rony Iwryn, Shanir Blumenkranz, Navid Kandelousi, Yoed Nir, Salit Lahav, Yonatan Voltzok, Asa Kook, and Nikki Glaspie.

In 2023, the band released "Shabazi – A Tribute to the Poet." The album homaged the 17th century Yemeni rabbi and poet Shalom Shabazi, setting his words to new musical compositions.

Yemen Blues released the single "People" in 2024. Personnel included Kahalani on vocals and gimbri, Shanir Ezra Blumenkranz on bass and oud, Rony Iwryn on percussion, and Dan Mayo on drums. The single was a track from the 2024 album "Only Love Remains." The band dedicated the album to Ahmed Al-Shaiba, who died in a car accident in New York City at the age of 32.

In 2024, the PAARD performance venue in the Hague canceled a performance of Yemen Blues due to threats from pro-Palestinian groups.

== Other projects ==
In 2021, Kahalani founded Voices of Yemen, which performs Jewish liturgical songs from Yemen.

== Music and critical reception ==
WNYC described the music of Yemen Blues as having "incorporated the sounds of Moroccan trance, Arab and Bedouin folk, and Western funk and rock into a high energy, groove-filled dance party." Kahalani sings in Hebrew, Arabic, and "any language that sounds good with the melody." He told The Jerusalem Post, "In my creations, I use language as a tool. Sometimes Arabic or Hebrew don't fit with my melodies, so I opt for French or Creole instead. Even if I don't speak those languages, it becomes about their sound."

The Algemeiner reported on a 2018 Yemen Blues performance, saying, "During his performance, the front man seamlessly switched from low notes to impossibly high notes. Some songs sounded angelic, while others made you swear that he was having an exorcism. For much of the concert, Kahalani swung his arms and was a whirling dervish of energy. And then, at one moment, he sat on the floor of the stage — almost totally still — and cried."

== Discography ==
- Yemen Blues (2011)
- Yemen Blues Live (2013)
- Insaniya (2015)
- Shabazi – A Truibute to the Poet (2023)
- Only Love Remains, 2024
