= Lebroba =

Studio album by Andrew Cyrille
- Released: November 2, 2018
- Recorded: July 2017
- Studios: Reservoir Studios; New York
- Genre: Jazz
- Length: 42:24
- Label: ECM 2589
- Producer: Sun Chung

Andrew Cyrille chronology
Proximity (2016)	Lebroba (2018)	The News (2021)

Wadada Leo Smith chronology
Solo: Reflections and Meditations on Monk (2017)	Lebroba (2018)

Lebroba is an album by drummer Andrew Cyrille recorded in July 2017 and released on ECM November the following year. The trio features guitarist Bill Frisell and trumpeter Wadada Leo Smith. "Lebroba" is an abbreviation of Leland/Brooklyn/Baltimore, the trio's respective hometowns.

== Reception ==
Professional ratings
Review scores
Source	Rating
AllMusic	4/5 stars
All About Jazz	4/5 stars
Jazz Trail	A+
DownBeat	4.5/5 stars
Jazz Journal	4/5 stars
Tom Hull – on the Web	B+

Response was generally positive, with the AllMusic review by Thom Jurek stating, "While much of Lebroba is gentle, none of it is nebulous or speculative. This trio engages in the kind of magical interplay that only extremely experienced players can conjure."

On All About Jazz, Mark Sullivan noted the album makes a "strong argument for Andrew Cyrille as composer, bandleader, and even drummer. He seems to have found a new voice, which is a delight to hear. Both Frisell and Smith shine in this context, supporting Cyrille's concept while also making strong individual contributions."

In JazzTimes, Britt Robson observed, "Lebroba relaxes you like a landscape painting, allowing your senses to settle easily over the whole, with the opportunity always available to be stimulated by the details."

Bill Milkowski, writing for DownBeat, awarded the album 4½ stars, calling the trio a "remarkably creative and empathetic triumvirate," and commenting: "Rather than fronting the proceedings by flaunting his chops, Cyrille underscores Lebroba with a combination of grace, zen-like restraint and authority."

In a review for London Jazz News, Jane Mann stated: "Lebroba is a fine album which repays repeated listening. Cyrille is quoted as saying: 'I didn't want to play all the time—I wanted to play rhythms with spaces between them, and to play melodically, in relation to what they were doing… and like a fibrillating heart.' Cyrille does just that, with this thoughtful and inventive trio."

Jazz Journal's Peter Gamble called the album "an engaging, considered session of considerable charm," and remarked: "it is impossible to differentiate between the written and the improvised; in this case a demarcation line of no importance... This shortish but enjoyable disc should be heard more widely than within the coterie of ECM devotees."

Lebroba finished in third place in the 2018 NPR Music Jazz Critics Poll with critic Lloyd Sachs praising the music for going "deeper into the uncharted territory of [Cyrille]'s 2016 ECM album, The Declaration of Musical Independence." Rolling Stone ranked the album number nineteen on their 20 Best Jazz Albums of 2018 list.

== Track listing ==
1. "Worried Woman" (Bill Frisell) – 7:35
2. "Turiya: Alice Coltrane Meditations and Dreams: Love" (Wadada Leo Smith) – 17:24
3. "Lebroba" (Andrew Cyrille) – 5:44
4. "TGD" (Andrew Cyrille, Bill Frisell, Wadada Leo Smith) – 5:17
5. "Pretty Beauty" (Andrew Cyrille) – 6:24

== Personnel ==
- Andrew Cyrille – drums
- Bill Frisell – guitar
- Wadada Leo Smith – trumpet
