= Trummer (surname) =

Trummer is a surname. Notable people with the surname include:

- David Trummer (born 1994), Austrian mountain biker
- Klaus Trummer (born 1945), East German slalom canoeist
- Michael Trummer (born 1962), German slalom canoeist
- Olivia Trummer (born 1985), German jazz musician
- Simon Trummer (born 1989), Swiss racing driver
- Tim Trummer (born 2005), Austrian footballer
- Vincent Trummer (born 2000), Austrian footballer
