= Kurt Rosenwinkel =

American jazz musician and bandleader

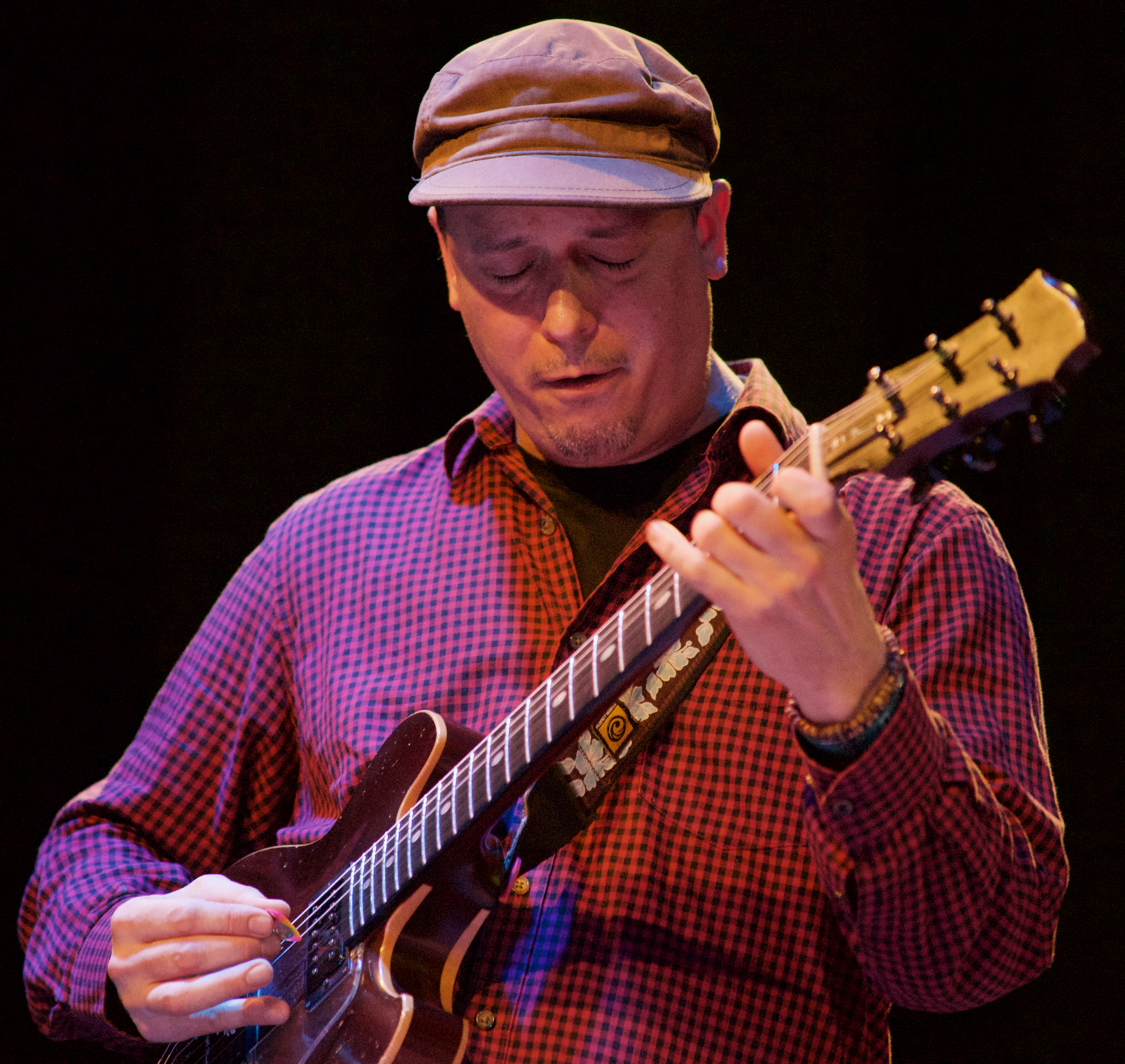
- Rosenwinkel performing in November 2018

Background information
- Born: Kurt Peter Rosenwinkel; October 28, 1970 (age 56); Philadelphia, Pennsylvania, U.S.
- Genre: Jazz
- Occupation: Musician
- Instruments: Guitar, piano
- Years active: 1990–present
- Labels: Verve, ArtistShare, Wommusic, Heartcore, Gateway Music
- Website: kurtrosenwinkel.com

Kurt Rosenwinkel (born October 28, 1970) is an American jazz guitarist, composer, bandleader, producer, educator, keyboardist and record label owner.

== Biography ==
Born in Philadelphia to a musical family, Rosenwinkel began taking piano lessons when he was nine years old. When he was 12, he began studying jazz guitar. Rosenwinkel attended the Philadelphia High School for the Creative and Performing Arts alongside classmates including Christian McBride, Joey DeFrancesco, and future Roots drummer Ahmir "Questlove" Thompson. He studied at Berklee College of Music for two and a half years before leaving in his third year to tour with Gary Burton, the dean of the school at the time. After moving to Brooklyn, he began performing with Human Feel, Paul Motian's Electric Bebop Band, Joe Henderson, and the Brian Blade Fellowship.

In 1995 he won the Composer's Award from the National Endowment for the Arts and was signed by Verve. Since then, he has played and recorded as a leader and sideman with Mark Turner, Brad Mehldau, Joel Frahm, and Brian Blade. He collaborated with Q-Tip, who co-produced his studio album Heartcore that includes bassist Ben Street, drummer Jeff Ballard, and saxophonist Mark Turner. He played guitar on Q-Tip's albums The Renaissance and Kamaal/The Abstract.

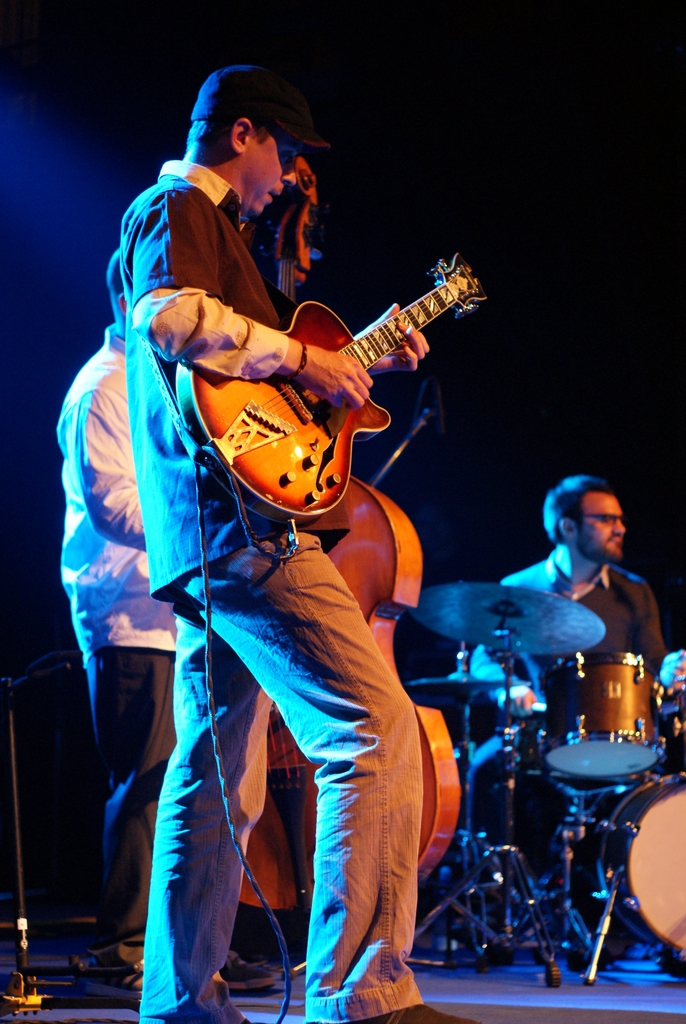
Rosenwinkel in April 2010

In 2008 The Remedy was released, recorded with saxophonist Mark Turner, pianist Aaron Goldberg, bassist Joe Martin, and drummer Eric Harland. On November 10, 2009, he released a trio recording, Standards Trio: Reflections, with bassist Eric Revis and drummer Eric Harland. On September 7, 2010, he released Kurt Rosenwinkel & OJM: Our Secret World with OJM, an 18-piece big band from Porto, Portugal. His album Star of Jupiter was recorded with pianist Aaron Parks, bassist Eric Revis, and drummer Justin Faulkner. He is on the faculty at the Hochschule für Musik Hanns Eisler.

In 2016, Rosenwinkel formed the independent music label Heartcore Records and began producing as well as performing. He produced his eleventh album, Caipi (2017), and was a producer and guitarist on Brazilian multi-instrumentalist Pedro Martin's album Vox (2019).

Rosenwinkel's musical contributions have extended beyond jazz. He has been a member of the Crossroads Guitar Festival family since 2013, when he was invited by guitarist Eric Clapton to share the stage. Clapton appeared on Rosenwinkel's Caipi (2017), playing on the song "Little Dream". Rosenwinkel played in a hip hop setting with Q-Tip on The Renaissance (2008) and Kamaal the Abstract (2009). He appeared on Late Night with Jimmy Fallon with The Roots, and collaborated with Domi and JD Beck.

== Style ==
Rosenwinkel's influences include John Coltrane, Bud Powell, David Bowie, Joe Henderson, Charlie Parker, Keith Jarrett, Pat Metheny, Allan Holdsworth, Tal Farlow, George Van Eps, Bill Frisell, John Scofield, and Alex Lifeson.

The Jazz Book calls Rosenwinkel "a visionary composer, with an infinitely sensitive way of layering electronic sounds, borrowed from ambient music, dub, and drum and bass, and manipulating them intelligently."

== Equipment ==
Rosenwinkel has played a D'Angelico New Yorker, a Sadowsky semi-hollow body, a Gibson ES-335, guitars made by Italian luthier Domenico Moffa, a Yamaha SG, a Gibson SG, and a signature model made by Westville Guitars.

Rosenwinkel has used a variety of effects, including: Neunaber WET Stereo Reverb, Strymon Timeline, Strymon Mobius, Strymon Blue Sky Reverb, Strymon El Capistan dTape Echo, Digitech Vocalist, Thegigrig HumDinger, Rockett Allan Holdsworth, Empress ParaEQ, Pro Co RAT distortion, TC Electronic Nova Reverb, Lehle D. Loop Effect-loop/Switcher, Malekko Echo 600 Dark, Old World Audio 1960 Compressor, Electro-Harmonix HOG Polyphonic Guitar Synthesizer, Eventide TimeFactor Delay, Xotic X-Blender Effects Loops, Empress Tremolo, Lehle Parallel line mixer, TC Electronic SCF stereo chorus flanger, and Boss Corporation OC-3 octave, Strymon Riverside, Eventide H9, EHX Pog 2, Source Audio EQ, among others. He has also used a Lavalier lapel microphone fed into his guitar amplifier that blends his vocalizing with his guitar.

== Discography ==
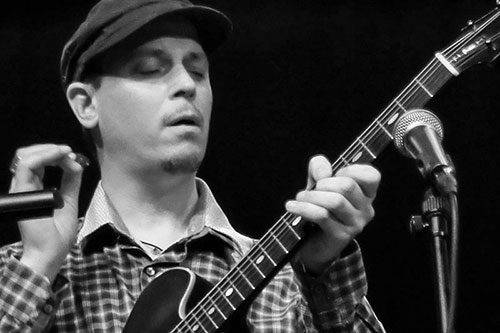
Rosenwinkel performs in Denmark in 2016 with Aarhus Jazz Orchestra, directed by Geir Lysne

=== As leader/co-leader ===
Year recorded	Title / Co-leader	Label	Year released	Notes
1992	Do It 1992 with Scott Kinsey	Heartcore	2019	Limited edition
1996	East Coast Love Affair	Fresh Sound	1996	Live
1996	The Enemies of Energy	Verve	2000	
1998	Intuit	Criss Cross	1999	
2000	The Next Step	Verve	2001	
2001–2003	Heartcore	Verve	2003	
2005?	Deep Song	Verve	2005	
2006	The Remedy	Wommusic · ArtistShare	2008	[2CD] Live
2009	Reflections	Wommusic	2009	
2009	Our Secret World	Wommusic	2010	
2012	Star of Jupiter	Wommusic	2012	[2CD]
2012	A Lovesome Thing with Geri Allen	Heartcore · Motéma Music	2023	Live
2007–2017	Caipi	Razdaz Recordz	2017	
2017–2018	Bandit 65: Searching the Continuum	Heartcore	2019	Live
2020?	Angels Around	Heartcore	2020	
2020	Plays Piano	Heartcore	2021	
2022?	The Chopin Project with Jean-Paul Brodbeck	Heartcore	2022	
2022?	Berlin Baritone	Heartcore	2022	
2023	Undercover (Live at the Village Vanguard)	Heartcore	2023	Live
2024	The Brahms Project with Jean-Paul Brodbeck	Heartcore	2025	

=== As a member ===
Human Feel
With Chris Speed, Andrew D'Angelo and Jim Black

- Scatter (GM, 1991)
- Welcome to Malpesta (New World, 1994)
- Speak to It (Songlines, 1996)
- Galore (Skirl, 2007)
- Gold (Intakt, 2019)

=== As sideman ===
With Brian Blade

- Perceptual (Blue Note, 2000)
- Season of Changes (Verve, 2008)
- Mama Rosa (Verve Forecast, 2009)
- Kings Highway (Stoner Hill, 2023)

With Seamus Blake

- The Call (Criss Cross, 1994)
- Stranger Things Have Happened (Fresh Sound, 1999)

With Chris Cheek

- I Wish I Knew (Fresh Sound, 1997)
- Vine (Fresh Sound, 2000)

With Aaron Goldberg

- Worlds (Sunnyside, 2006)
- The Now (Sunnyside, 2014)

With Rebecca Martin

- Middlehope (Fresh Sound, 2001)
- The Growing Season (Sunnyside, 2008)

With Barney McAll

- Release the Day (Transparent Music, 2000)
- Flashbacks (Extra Celestial Arts, 2009)
- Mother of Dreams and Secrets (Research, 2018)

With Paul Motian

- 1992: Paul Motian and the Electric Bebop Band (JMT, 1993)
- 1994: Reincarnation of a Love Bird (JMT, 1994)
- 1996: Flight of the Blue Jay (Winter & Winter, 1997)
- 1998: Play Monk and Powell (Winter & Winter, 1999)

With Q-Tip

- 2001: Kamaal the Abstract (Jive, 2009)
- 2003–08: The Renaissance (Universal Motown, 2008)

With Joshua Redman

- Momentum (Nonesuch, 2005)
- Where Are We (Blue Note, 2023)

With Mark Turner

- 1994: Yam Yam (Criss Cross, 1995)
- 1998: In This World (Warner Bros., 1998)
- 1999: Ballad Session (Warner Bros., 2000)
- 2001: Dharma Days (Warner Bros., 2001)

With others

- Gary Burton, Six Pack (GRP, 1992)
- Larry Goldings, Big Stuff (Warner Bros., 1996)
- Chris Potter, Vertigo (Concord Jazz, 1998)
- Jochen Rueckert, Introduction (Jazzline, 1998)
- Wax Poetic, Three (Doublemoon, 1998)
- George Colligan, Unresolved (Fresh Sound, 1999)
- Joe Claussell, Language (Ibadan, 1999)
- Marcy Playground, Shapeshifter (Capitol, 1999)
- Tim Hagans, Animation Imagination (Blue Note, 1999)
- Toku, Everything She Said (SME, 2000)
- Danilo Perez, Motherland (Verve, 2002)
- Jakob Dinesen, Everything Will Be All Right (Stunt, 2002)
- Matthias Lupri, Same Time Twice (Summit, 2002)
- Eli Degibri, In the Beginning (Fresh Sound, 2003)
- Perico Sambeat, Friendship (ACT, 2003)
- Charlie Peacock, Love Press Ex-Curio (Runway, 2005)
- Daniel Szabo, Frictions (Pid, 2007)
- Jason Lindner, Gives You Now vs Now (Anzic, 2009)
- Joel Frahm, Live at Smalls (SmallsLIVE, 2011) – live
- Donald Fagen, Sunken Condos (Reprise, 2012)
- Jo-Yu Chen, Stranger (Okeh, 2014)
- Olivia Trummer, Fly Now (Contemplate Music, 2014)
- Alain Apaloo, Nunya (Gateway Music, 2015)
- Nitai Hershkovits, I Asked You a Question (Raw Tapes/Time Grove, 2016)
- Orrin Evans, #knowingishalfthebattle (Smoke Sessions, 2016)
- Riccardo Del Fra, Moving People (Parco Della Musica, 2018)
- Kyle Crane, Crane Like the Bird (Self-released, 2019)
- Tobias Meinhart, Berlin People (Sunnyside, 2019)
- Nicola Andrioli, Skylight (Heartcore, 2022)
- Domi and JD Beck, NOT TiGHT (Blue Note, 2022)
- Louis Cole, Quality Over Opinion (Brainfeeder, 2022)
- Joe Farnswoth, In What Direction Are You Headed? (Smoke Sessions, 2023)
- Jim Snidero, Far Far Away (Savant Records Inc., 2023)
