= Costumes Are Mandatory =

Studio album by Ethan Iverson, Lee Konitz, Larry Grenadier and Jorge Rossy
- Released: July 23, 2013
- Recorded: August 2012
- Studio: Brooklyn Recording, Brooklyn, NY
- Genre: Jazz
- Length: 56:02
- Label: HighNote; HCD 7249
- Producer: Ethan Iverson

Ethan Iverson chronology
Live at Smalls (2000)	Costumes Are Mandatory (2013)	The Purity of the Turf (2016)

Lee Konitz chronology
Enfants Terribles (2012)	Costumes Are Mandatory (2013)	First Meeting: Live in London, Volume 1 (2014)

Costumes Are Mandatory is a studio album by American jazz pianist Ethan Iverson recorded with saxophonist Lee Konitz, bassist Larry Grenadier, and drummer Jorge Rossy. The album was recorded in 2012 and released by the HighNote label the following year, on July 23, 2013.

== Reception ==
Professional ratings
Review scores
Source	Rating
All About Jazz	4.5/5 stars
AllMusic	3.5/5 stars
The Irish Times	4/5 stars
Winnipeg Free Press	4/5 stars

The All About Jazz review by Greg Simmons said, "while the music may indeed be collaborative, even multi-improvisational at times, it's Iverson's date and he's very clearly the leader ... The record is envisioned as an homage to—"a dialogue with," according to the liner notes—the late blind pianist Lennie Tristano, who in addition to generally being credited as a founder of the 'cool school' (an oversimplification, to be sure), and an early avant-garde pioneer, was also a primary teacher and influence on Konitz ... Strangely, given its stated intent, there isn't a single composition credited to Tristano on the record ... Costumes Are Mandatory might work best because the music and the musicians have either approached Tristano with completely different competing musical influences, or in the case of Konitz, having completely absorbed then transcended his former mentor. They're not trying to imitate Tristano, but they forge just enough of a connection to make a truly interesting record that's worth seeking out".

The Irish Times's Cormac Larkin noted, "this is one of those rare records that will satisfy fogey and futurist alike". Peter Margasak of Chicago Reader noted, "I don't know that I've enjoyed a straight-ahead jazz record more this year." Thom Jurek of AllMusic added, "Costumes Are Mandatory is anything but a conventional recording: these players communicate, inquire, and argue with one another as much as they do Tristano and seem to delight in the process, which is a reward for any jazz listener."

In his review for JazzTimes, Lloyd Sachs stated, "Far from your classic session combining a young cutting-edge stalwart and revered master, Costumes Are Mandatory is a quirky assemblage of odds and ends. Framed as an homage to Lennie Tristano, it sometimes teams pianist and project instigator Ethan Iverson and alto great (and former Tristanian) Lee Konitz and sometimes features piano pieces that possibly were recorded to fill out the album. It sometimes plays things straight and sometimes features overdubs and echoey or prepared piano effects. And then there's the scat vocal Konitz sings, a bit uneasily".

Writing for HuffPost contributor Ralph A. Miriello observed, "Costumes Are Mandatory is a wonderful body of music that more than makes up for some of its rough spots by offering moments of unvarnished beauty from a marvelously supple group of musicians and magical playing by Mr. Konitz, a living legend of his craft" Chris Smith of Winnipeg Free Press commented, "Grenadier's full-bodied bass and Konitz's wandering alto are a superb combination."

== Track listing ==
All compositions by Ethan Iverson except where noted

1. "Blueberry Ice Cream" [Take 2] – 3:23
2. "Try a Little Tenderness" (Harry M. Woods, Jimmy Campbell, Reg Connelly) – 7:03
3. "It's You (Tempo Complex)" (Lee Konitz) – 1:05
4. "It's You" (Konitz) – 4:54
5. "What's New?" (Bob Haggart, Johnny Burke) – 5:33
6. "317 East 32nd" (Konitz) – 4:47
7. "Body and Soul" (Johnny Green, Edward Heyman, Robert Sour, Frank Eyton) – 5:49
8. "Blueberry Hill" (Vincent Rose, Larry Stock, Al Lewis) – 4:42
9. "A Distant Bell" – 2:01
10. "Bats" – 2:12
11. "Mr. Bumi" – 1:19
12. "My New Lovers All Seem So Tame" – 2:36
13. "My Old Flame" (Sam Coslow, Arthur Johnston) – 7:04
14. "Blueberry Ice Cream" [Take 1] – 3:24

== Personnel ==
- Ethan Iverson – piano
- Lee Konitz – alto saxophone, vocals
- Larry Grenadier – bass
- Jorge Rossy – drums
