= Star of Jupiter =

Studio album by Kurt Rosenwinkel
- Released: November 13, 2012
- Recorded: March 6–9, 2012
- Studio: The Clubhouse Studio, New York
- Genre: Jazz
- Length: 91:36
- Label: Wommusic
- Producer: Kurt Rosenwinkel

Kurt Rosenwinkel chronology
Our Secret World (2010)	Star of Jupiter (2012)	Caipi (2017)

Professional ratings
Review scores
Source	Rating
Allmusic	4.5/5 stars

Star of Jupiter is Kurt Rosenwinkel's tenth album as a band leader. This album includes a new band and is Rosenwinkel's first quartet album since The Next Step (2001). The album includes mostly new songs with a remake of an old composition, "A Shifting Design". A review at All About Jazz called the album "a contemporary classic." Transcriptions of the album have been published by Mel Bay.

== Track listing ==
All pieces by Kurt Rosenwinkel.

Disc 1:

1. "Gamma Band" – 7:03
2. "Welcome Home" – 4:46
3. "Something, Sometime" – 6:21
4. "Mr. Hope" – 5:30
5. "Heavenly Bodies" – 11:25
6. "Homage A'Mitch" – 7:47

Disc 2:

1. "Spirit Kiss" – 8:39
2. "kurt1" – 6:51
3. "Under It All" – 7:27
4. "A Shifting Design" – 5:59
5. "Deja Vu" – 10:54
6. "Star of Jupiter" – 8:58

== Personnel ==
- Kurt Rosenwinkel – guitar and vocals
- Aaron Parks – piano
- Eric Revis – bass
- Justin Faulkner – drums
