= The Remedy (Kurt Rosenwinkel album) =

Live album by Kurt Rosenwinkel Group
- Released: March 21, 2008
- Recorded: January 2006
- Genre: Jazz
- Length: 2 hours
- Label: Wommusic · ArtistShare
- Producer: Kurt Rosenwinkel

Kurt Rosenwinkel Group chronology
Deep Song (2005)	The Remedy (2008)	Reflections (2009)

Professional ratings
Review scores
Source	Rating
Allmusic	4/5 stars

The Remedy is Kurt Rosenwinkel's seventh album as a leader. It is a 2-disc album recorded live at the Village Vanguard in January 2006. All songs were written by Rosenwinkel except "Myrons World," which was written by Mark Turner. All of the tracks feature the band taking extended solos. This 2-disc album is the first release to appear on Kurt Rosenwinkel's own WOMMUSIC (Word of Mouth Music); it was originally distributed by ArtistShare.

== Track listing ==
Disc 1

1. Chords — 16:21
2. The Remedy — 11:37
3. Flute — 14:23
4. A Life Unfolds — 17:54

Disc 2

1. View From Moscow — 12:51
2. Terra Nova — 11:42
3. Safe Corners — 17:10
4. Myrons World — 19:13

== Personnel ==
- Kurt Rosenwinkel — Guitar
- Mark Turner — Tenor Saxophone
- Aaron Goldberg —Piano
- Joe Martin — Bass
- Eric Harland — Drums
