= Live at Smalls (Ethan Iverson album) =

Live album by Ethan Iverson
- Released: 2000
- Recorded: 8 February 2000
- Venue: Smalls Jazz Club
- Genre: Jazz
- Length: 65:53
- Label: Fresh Sound New Talent
- Producers: Ethan Iverson, Bill McHenry

Ethan Iverson chronology
The Minor Passions (1999)	Live at Smalls (2000)	Costumes Are Mandatory (2013)

Professional ratings
Review scores
Source	Rating
AllMusic	3/5 stars
The Penguin Guide to Jazz on CD	3/4 stars

Live at Smalls is a live album by American jazz pianist Ethan Iverson's quartet. The band consisted of Iverson on piano, Reid Anderson on double bass, Jeff Williams on drums, and Bill McHenry on tenor saxophone. The album was recorded on 8 February 2000 at Smalls Jazz Club in New York City and released in 2000 by the Fresh Sound New Talent label.

== Reception ==
David R. Adler of AllMusic stated, "Pianist Ethan Iverson and tenor saxophonist Bill McHenry focus on quirky readings of standards in this co-led band, which they've unofficially named "Sub-Standard." The quartet is completed by bassist Reid Anderson and drummer Jeff Williams, both of whom supply a kind of perpetually off-kilter rhythmic feel underneath the two adventurous soloists. The music's in tempo, but not quite..."

== Track listing ==
No.	Title	Writer(s)	Length
1.	"Night and Day"	Cole Porter	7:38
2.	"Chronology"	Ornette Coleman	3:59
3.	"Theme from "Mr. Bean""	Howard Goodall	5:09
4.	"The Look of Love"	Burt Bacharach	8:00
5.	"Have You Met Miss Jones?"	Richard Rodgers, Lorenz Hart	7:20
6.	"In Love in Vain"	Jerome Kern, Leo Robin	10:45
7.	"How High the Moon"	Morgan Lewis, Nancy Hamilton	8:24
8.	"You've Changed"	Bill Carey, Carl T. Fischer	8:32
9.	"Blues Coda"	Bill McHenry	6:03
Total length:			65:53

== Personnel ==
- Ethan Iverson – piano
- Bill McHenry – tenor saxophone
- Reid Anderson – double bass
- Jeff Williams – drums
