= Crane Like the Bird =

Studio album by Kyle Crane
- Released: January 18, 2019
- Length: 37:41

Crane Like the Bird is an album by Crane Like the Bird, led by Kyle Crane.

== Recording and music ==
The album was the first recorded as a leader by Kyle Crane. The instrumentation varies from track to track, but keyboards and synthesizers feature prominently.

"Now" features horns and vibraphones; "Grizzly Creek Redwoods State Park" contains guitar and bass. James Mercer sings on "Wishing Cap". Luke Steele sings on "Mendocino". Brad Mehldau plays keyboards and piano on "Kaleidoscope", which also features Sabina Sciubba on vocals. Conor Oberst sings on "When I See", which has Daniel Lanois on pedal steel guitar and Kurt Rosenwinkel on guitar. "Glass Half Full" features Peter Morén; "The Painter" features M. Ward.

== Releases and reception ==
Crane Like the Bird was released on January 18, 2019. "Nicole" was first released as a single; "Wishing Cap" was released as a single on December 19, 2018.

The Spill Magazine reviewer highlighted the contrast between the energy and positive tone of the music and the themes of nostalgia and loss in the lyrics. Thefirenote's reviewer wrote: "By maintaining a strong musical flow through the album, Crane takes advantage of his multiple collaborators' talents while delving into deep emotions of loss and grief without becoming maudlin and despairing, and marking it as a strong, personal statement."

== Track listing ==
1. "Wishing Cap" – 2:27
2. "Now" – 3:27
3. "Nicole" – 3:10
4. "Grizzly Creek Redwoods State Park" – 4:06
5. "Mendocino" – 3:30
6. "When I See" – 3:52
7. "Kaleidoscope" – 9:29
8. "Glass Half Full" – 3:12
9. "The Painter" – 4:28

== Personnel ==
- Kyle Crane – writer, producer, lyrics, drums, piano, keyboards, bass, guitar, vocals
- James Mercer – vocals (track 1)
- Ben Bridwell – vocals (track 3)
- Luke Steele – vocals (track 5)
- Conor Oberst – vocals (track 6)
- Daniel Lanois – pedal steel guitar (track 6)
- Kurt Rosenwinkel – guitar (track 6)
- Sabina Sciubba – vocals (track 7)
- Brad Mehldau – piano, keyboards (track 7)
- Peter Morén (track 8)
- M. Ward (track 9)
