= Yisrael Borochov =

Israeli musician and composer (born 1950)

Yisrael Borochov ישראל בורוכוב
- Born: 1950 (age 75–76); Tel Aviv, Israel
- Origin: Israel
- Genres: World Music, Ethnic Music
- Occupations: Musician, Composer, Arranger
- Instruments: Fretless bass guitar, Double bass, Dulcimer, Jumbush, Percussion
- Years active: 1970s–present
- Spouse: Karin Kloosterman
- Children: 2 (Avri Borochov, Itamar Borochov)
- Awards: First place at the Red Sea Jazz Festival (1987); Award for original art and culture in Israel (Israel's 40th anniversary); Award from The Histadrut for unique combination of musical traditions

Yisrael Borochov (Hebrew: ישראל בורוכוב; born in Tel Aviv in 1950), is an Israeli musician, composer, and arranger.

== Biography ==
Borochov was born in Tel Aviv, and raised in Tiberias. He is a self-taught musician who plays the fretless bass guitar, double bass, the dulcimer, jumbush, and percussion. He played in an IDF army band, and recorded with musicians including David Broza and Yehudit Ravitz.

Borochov was one of the original founders of The Natural Gathering (HaBreira Hateeveet) with Shlomo Bar, and played in and arranged the group's first two albums.

Borochov founded the East West Ensemble in 1985.

Over his 40-year-long career Borochov has merged East and West concepts and rhythms with his group, the East West Ensemble. He has played with famous names including Laurie Anderson, and L. Shankar from Shakti, Yas-Kaz, an avant-garde drummer from Japan, and has collaborated with influential eastern musicians such as Omar Faruk Tekbilek.

At the first Red Sea Jazz Festival in 1987, his East West Ensemble won first place. When the State of Israel celebrated its 40th anniversary, the East West Ensemble won an award for original art and culture in Israel. The labor union of Israel (The Histadrut) gave Borochov an award for his unique combination of musical traditions.

In the late 1990s, Borochov founded the first alternative World Music non-profit venue in Jaffa, Israel, calling it the East West House. Supported by the City of Tel Aviv-Jaffa, and the Ministry of Culture in Israel, about 30 bands a year, from Israel and abroad, vie for the chance to come to play at the house in Jaffa, known for its selection of highly unique and somewhat esoteric ethnic music derived from eastern traditions. Guest musicians to the house include those from Egypt, Iran, Jordan, India, Turkey, Europe and the United States.

Borochov has released five albums through the East West Ensemble cover, most recently Debka Fantasia an album which explores the early relationship between new Jewish pioneers to Israel in the 1920s onward, alongside the Bedouin people they encountered in the land of Israel.

He has composed music for film, theater and television, including the HBO movie Steal the Sky, featuring Muriel Hemmingway, and more recently for the Adam Sandler film You Don't Mess with the Zohan.

Borochov, originally set out to trace the historical roots of the pioneers of Israeli song – Nahum Nardi, Mordechai Zeira, Moshe Wilensky, Sasha Argov, Emanuel Zamir, Emanuel Amiran, and many others – and discovered them in the music of the native-born Arab shepherd. This insight may not be anything new, but Borochov did not stop there: Working with Bedouin musicologist Muhammad Abu Ajaj and jazz musician Omer Avital, he decided to link the pioneering songs to their sources while also infusing them with a new sound. The result, "Debka Fantasia," reflects tremendous research, knowledge, seriousness and cultural commitment, and is also noteworthy in terms of its near-symphonic sound and emotional impact.

Borochov has collaborated on a large number of theatre projects in Israel, and has taken his band to perform around the world, in the United States, Japan, Hong Kong, Berlin, Paris, Toronto and many more. He has developed projects for the highly coveted Israel Festival, three times. At the festival, Yisrael Borochov became the first advisor for ethnic music from around the world. One of his Israel Festival projects was The Hidden Spirituals, which investigated ancient Jewish musical traditions around the Diaspora which were influenced by Kabbalistic principles and prayers, and the Debka Fantasia project still being performed in Israel and around the world today.

Borochov is currently working on a new spiritual music project, revolving around Bucharian Jews. The program will be performed at the Piyut Festival in Jerusalem in September, 2015.

== Musical influences ==
Borochov gives his musical influences to be Shakti, Oregon, Night Ark, Kardes Turkuler, Peter Gabriel, Ludwig van Beethoven, David Darling, Weather Report, New York Rock & Roll Ensemble, and Santana.

== Personal life ==
Both his sons Avri Borochov, a double bass player, and Itamar Borochov, a trumpet player, are accomplished musicians playing in the New York scene, Europe and in Israel. He is married to Karin Kloosterman, environment news writer. His ex-wife Daniella Michaeli is an established theatre actor, choreographer and artistic director in Israel. His daughter Oryan Borochov is a singer-songwriter, enrolled in Israel's most prestigious art school, Thelma Yellin. He has a younger son, Gavriel Borochov, who studies bass.

== Discography ==
- Imaginary Ritual (1988)
- Zurna (1992)
- Sinai Memories (1998)
- The Hidden Spirituals (2006)
- Debka Fantasia (2009)
