= Reflections (Kurt Rosenwinkel album) =

Studio album by Kurt Rosenwinkel
- Released: November 2009
- Recorded: June 18–20, 2009 at Brooklyn Recording, Brooklyn, New York
- Genre: Jazz
- Length: 50:56
- Label: WOMMUSIC
- Producer: Kurt Rosenwinkel

Kurt Rosenwinkel chronology
The Remedy (2008)	Reflections (2009)	Our Secret World (2010)

Professional ratings
Review scores
Source	Rating
Allmusic	link

Reflections is Kurt Rosenwinkel's eighth album as a band leader.

== Track listing ==
No.	Title	Writer(s)	Length
1.	"Reflections"	Thelonious Monk	9:12
2.	"You Go to My Head"	John Frederick Coots / Haven Gillespie	3:36
3.	"Fall"	Wayne Shorter	4:02
4.	"East Coast Love Affair"	Kurt Rosenwinkel	9:53
5.	"Ask Me Now"	Thelonious Monk	5:22
6.	"Ana Maria"	Wayne Shorter	6:27
7.	"More Than You Know"	Vincent Youmans / Billy Rose / Edward Eliscu	8:58
8.	"You've Changed"	Bill Carey / Carl Fischer	3:15

== Personnel ==
- Kurt Rosenwinkel - Guitar
- Eric Revis - Bass
- Eric Harland - Drums
