= Bill McHenry =

American jazz saxophonist and composer (born 1972)

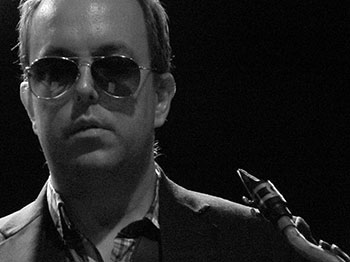

Background information
- Born: 1972 (age 53–54); Blue Hill, Maine, U.S.
- Genres: Jazz, avant-garde jazz
- Occupation: Musician
- Instrument: Saxophone
- Labels: Fresh Sound, Sunnyside
- Website: www.billmchenry.com

Bill McHenry (born 1972) is an American jazz saxophonist and composer. He is the leader of the Bill McHenry Quartet and has released over a dozen albums under his own name, in addition to collaborating on many more.

== Early life ==
McHenry was born in Blue Hill, Maine, in 1972. He attended the Interlochen Arts Academy, and went on to study at the New England Conservatory of Music.

== Later life and career ==
McHenry moved to New York in 1992. His recording debut as a leader was Rest Stop, with Ben Monder, Chris Higgins and Dan Reiser in 1997. It was followed by Graphic two years later, with Ben Monder, Reid Anderson and Gerald Cleaver. In 2002 he recorded his music with Paul Motian and that led to appearances at the Village Vanguard and two more albums, Roses and Ghosts of the Sun, also with Ben Monder and Reid Anderson. Proximity, a duo recording with drummer Andrew Cyrille, was released around 2016.

== Discography ==
=== As leader/co-leader ===
- Jazz Is Where You Find It (Fresh Sound, 1997)
- Rest Stop (Fresh Sound, 1998)
- Graphic (Fresh Sound, 1999)
- Live at Smalls with Reid Anderson, Ethan Iverson, and Jeff Williams (Fresh Sound, 2000)
- Quartet Featuring Paul Motian (Fresh Sound, 2003)
- Sonic Pressure (Fresh Sound, 2007)
- Roses (Sunnyside, 2007)
- Rediscovery with John McNeil (Sunnyside, 2008)
- Chill Morn He Climb Jenny with John McNeil (Sunnyside, 2010)
- Bloom with Ben Monder (Sunnyside, 2010)
- Ghosts of the Sun (Sunnyside, 2011)
- La Peur Du Vide (Sunnyside, 2012)
- Proximity with Andrew Cyrille (Sunnyside, 2016)
- Ben Entrada La Nit (Fresh Sound, 2018)
- Solo (Underpool 2018)

=== As sideman ===
With Avishai Cohen

- Into the Silence (ECM, 2016)

With Guillermo Klein

- Filtros
- Live at the Village Vanguard (Sunnyside)
- Los Guachos V (Sunnyside)

With Ethan Iverson

- Live at Smalls (Fresh Sound, 2000)
