= Timeless Tales (For Changing Times) =

Studio album by Joshua Redman
- Released: September 22, 1998
- Studio: Avatar (New York, New York)
- Genre: Jazz
- Length: 2:08:50
- Label: Warner Bros.
- Producer: James Farber

Joshua Redman chronology
Freedom in the Groove (1996)	Timeless Tales (For Changing Times) (1998)	Beyond (2000)

Professional ratings
Review scores
Source	Rating
AllMusic	2.5/5 stars
The Buffalo News	3/4 stars
Penguin Guide to Jazz	3.5/4 stars
Tom Hull	B+
The Rolling Stone Jazz & Blues Album Guide	3.5/5 stars

Timeless Tales (For Changing Times) is a 1998 album by jazz saxophonist Joshua Redman. Many of the tracks featured pay tribute to the composers listed in parentheses. This is his sixth album for Warner Bros.

== Reception ==
Bill Milkowski of JazzTimes commented "Even when Joshua puts soprano to his mouth and wanders dangerously close to Kenny G territory on Joni Mitchell’s “I Had a King,” he is saved by Blade’s hip time displacement and Meldhau’s unorthodox voicings, which tweak Redman just enough to bypass the road to sapville. Blade helps jazz up Bob Dylan’s “The Times They Are A-Changin'” with nimble, swinging cymbal and snare statements while Meldhau makes like a jazzy Glenn Gould on this invention. A strong frontman aided immensely by a brilliant band." Jeff Simon of The Buffalo News commented, "It's a smart, pleasant standards disc by a younger player who has done better before and will again."

== Track listing ==
1. "Summertime" (George Gershwin)
2. "Interlude 1" (Joshua Redman)
3. "Visions" (Stevie Wonder)
4. "Yesterdays" (Jerome Kern)
5. "Interlude 2" (Joshua Redman)
6. "I Had a King" (Joni Mitchell)
7. "The Times They Are a-Changin'" (Bob Dylan)
8. "Interlude 3" (Joshua Redman)
9. "It Might as Well Be Spring" (Rodgers-Hammerstein)
10. "Interlude 4" (Joshua Redman)
11. "How Deep is the Ocean" (Irving Berlin)
12. "Interlude 5" (Joshua Redman)
13. "Love For Sale" (Cole Porter)
14. "Interlude 6" (Joshua Redman)
15. "Eleanor Rigby" (Lennon-McCartney)
16. "Interlude 7" (Joshua Redman)
17. "How Come U Don't Call Me Anymore?" (Prince)

== Personnel ==
- Joshua Redman – Tenor Saxophone
- Brad Mehldau – Piano
- Larry Grenadier – Bass
- Brian Blade – Drums
