= Kyle Crane =

American drummer

Kyle Crane is an American drummer. He is best known for his work with producer Daniel Lanois. He performed as Miles Teller's drum double for the film Whiplash.

== Biography ==
Crane is the son of a Coast Guard pilot, and lived in a number of different locales throughout his childhood. Crane attended Berklee College of Music. In 2016, he was living in Los Angeles.

== Career ==
Crane was discovered by Daniel Lanois while performing at a bar near Lanois’ Los Angeles home. He has since recorded and toured internationally with Lanois.

Though unlisted in the film's credits, multiple sources confirm that Crane performed as the drum double during the "Caravan scene" for the critically acclaimed Sundance and Academy Award-winning film Whiplash which is centered around a university drum student and his relationship with his strict teacher.

Crane was nominated in the Best Up and Coming Drummer category in the 2016 Modern Drummer Reader's Poll, and was the subject of a feature in the magazine's June 2015 issue.

Crane has also worked with Rufus Wainwright, Sam Wilkes, The Shins, Velocity of Tears, Brad Mehldau, Madison Cunningham, Bill Frisell, Conor Oberst, Neko Case, Kurt Vile, M. Ward, Luke Steele, Kurt Rosenwinkel, Elle King, Glen Ballard, Everest, Sam Barsh, Judith Hill, Blake Mills, Bridgit Mendler, Peter Morén, Mike Mogis of Bright Eyes, Pablo Alborán, Red Elvises, Alexi Murdoch, American Authors, Jesse & Joy, Pomplamoose, Ben Bridwell, Kandace Springs, John Mayer, Sabina Sciubba of Brazilian Girls, First Aid Kit, Iron and Wine, Corey Harper, Grandaddy, Buck Meek, Crystal Bowersox, Big K.R.I.T., Kacy & Clayton, and Rocco Deluca.

Crane's first album as a leader, Crane Like the Bird, was released in 2019.
