= Guillermo Klein =

Argentine pianist and composer

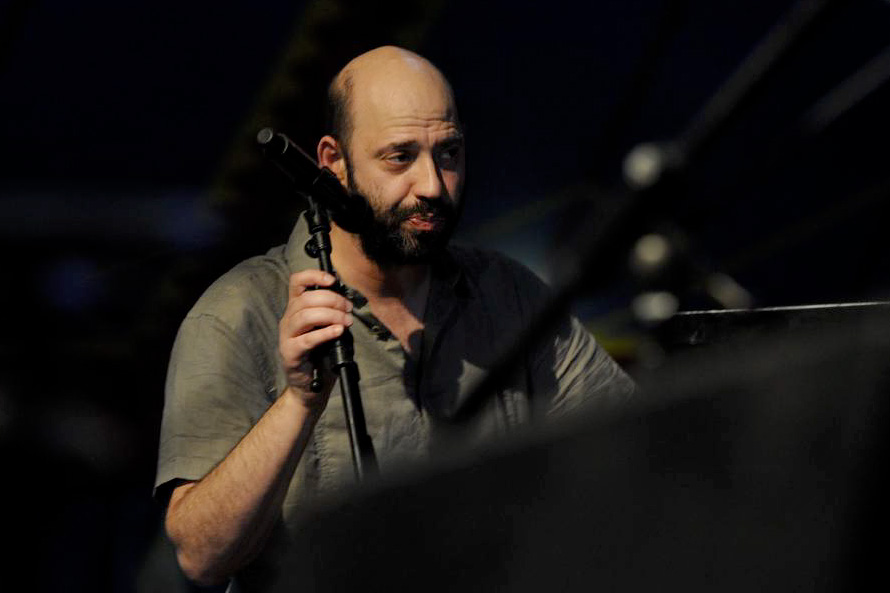
- Guillermo Klein moers festival 2009

Background information
- Born: Buenos Aires, Argentina
- Genre: Jazz
- Occupations: Musician, arranger
- Instruments: Piano
- Years active: 1994 –present
- Label: Sunnyside

Guillermo Klein is a composer, pianist and arranger born in Buenos Aires, Argentina.

Klein has released numerous albums with his ensemble Los Guachos, as well as with other groups as a leader. In a 2019 profile, The New York Times wrote that Los Guachos had remained together for nearly a quarter of a century, allowing Klein to develop "a songbook unlike any other in contemporary music." An earlier Times profile by Nate Chinen described Klein's music as building "fascinating bridges between jazz, pop, classical music and the chacareras and tangos of his native Argentina," adding that "his best music also carries smart harmonic ideas and surprising bolts of lyricism, but virtually all of it deals purposefully with the subject of groove."

Over the course of his career, Klein has collaborated with musicians including Liliana Herrero, Miguel Zenón, Seamus Blake, Wolfgang Muthspiel, Joshua Redman, Magos Herrera, Ambrose Akinmusire, Aaron Goldberg and more.

He graduated from Berklee College of Music in 1994, and throughout the 1990s held a residency at Smalls, a jazz club in New York City. Known for his highly original harmonic and stylistic concepts, Klein has garnered much respect from the jazz community. He spent most of the 2000s in Argentina and Spain, though he still played in the United States. He was commissioned by the MIT Wind Ensemble to write his first work for wind ensemble, Solar Return Suite, which was premiered on May 12, 2006. Klein has made yearly appearances with his band, Los Guachos, at the Village Vanguard since 2007. In 2008, he was a member of the jazz faculty at Musikene (Centro Superior de Música del País Vasco), the Higher School of Music of the Basque Country, in San Sebastián.

Klein has also worked with large ensembles and orchestras in the United States and Europe. His collaborations have included the American Composers Orchestra, Buenos Aires Philharmonic, hr-Bigband, Metropole Orkest, Orquestra de Jazz de Matosinhos, Swiss Jazz Orchestra and Girona Jazz Project. Klein has maintained an ongoing collaboration with the UMO Helsinki Jazz Orchestra, where he has also served as an artistic partner. Klein is a professor of Jazz Composition in the Master's program at the Jazzcampus Basel— FHNW.

== Discography ==
=== As leader/co-leader ===
- 1994: Guillermo Klein & Big Van, El Minotauro (Candid, 1997)
- 1996: Guillermo Klein & Los Guachos, Guachos I (unreleased)
- 1999: Guillermo Klein & Los Guachos, Los Guachos II (Sunnyside, 1999)
- 2000–2001: Guillermo Klein & Los Guachos, Los Guachos III (Sunnyside, 2002)[2CD]
- 2002: Una Nave (Sunnyside, 2005)
- 2004: Guillermo Klein & Los Guachos, Live in Barcelona (Fresh Sound New Talent, 2005) – live
- 2007: Guillermo Klein & Los Guachos, Filtros (Sunnyside, 2008)
- 2009: Bienestan with Aaron Goldberg (Sunnyside, 2011)
- 2009: Domador de Huellas: Music of "Cuchi" Leguizamón (Sunnyside, 2010)
- 2011: Guillermo Klein & Los Guachos, Carrera (Sunnyside, 2012)
- 2012: Live at the Village Vanguard (Sunnyside, 2014) – live
- 2015: Guillermo Klein & Los Guachos, Los Guachos V (Sunnyside, 2016)
- 2017?: The Upstate Project with Rebecca Martin (Sunnyside, 2017) – featuring Larry Grenadier and Jeff Ballard
- 2018: Guillermo Klein & Los Guachos, Los Guachos Cristal (Sunnyside, 2019)
- 2018: Swiss Jazz Orchestra & Guillermo Klein with Swiss Jazz Orchestra (Sunnyside, 2019)
- 2022: Guillermo Klein Quinteto, Telmo's Tune (Sunnyside, 2023)
- 2022–2023: Querer with Orquestra Jazz de Matosinhos (OJM) (Marsupial, 2026)

=== As sideman ===
- Giulia Valle, Colorista (Fresh Sound New Talent, 2004)
- Joe Smith, Melodic Workshop (Fresh Sound New Talent, 2004)
- Taylor Haskins, Wake Up Call (Fresh Sound New Talent, 2004)
- Roxana Amed, Inocencia (Acqua, 2011)
- MIT Wind Ensemble / MIT Festival Jazz Ensemble, Don Byron, Infinite Winds (Sunnyside, 2015) – featuring Guillermo Klein and Chick Corea. rec. 2006, 2013.
