= Jo-Yu Chen =

Taiwanese jazz pianist and composer

- Born: Taiwan
- Genres: Jazz
- Occupation(s): Musician, composer
- Instrument: Piano
- Labels: Sony Music
- Website: www.joyuchen.com

Jo-Yu Chen is a Taiwanese jazz pianist and composer.

== Life and career ==
Chen was born in Taiwan and initially studied classical music. She particularly listened to Romantic composers and moved aged 16 to New York's Juilliard School, mainly to study oboe. She became exposed to other kinds of music there, and became more interested in jazz. She later obtained a PhD in music education from Teachers College, Columbia University. She then continued her studies at The New School and took jazz piano lessons from Sam Yahel.

Chen's first album, Obsession, was released in 2009. This was followed three years later by another trio album, Incomplete Soul. In 2014, Chen, as "the first Taiwanese jazz artist signed to a major label", released Stranger, an album consisting largely of her original compositions. She released her fourth album, Savage Beauty, in 2019 and in 2025, Rendezvous: Jazz Meets Beethoven, Tchaikovsky & More, an album that features Chen's jazz interpretations of classical masterpieces.

== Discography ==
An asterisk (*) indicates that the year is that of release.

=== As leader/co-leader ===
Year recorded	Title	Label	Personnel/Notes
2009,2011*	Obsession	Sony Music Taiwan	Trio, with Chris Tordini (bass), Tommy Crane (drums), one track with Tyshawn Sorey (drums)
2012*	Incomplete Soul	Sony Music	Most tracks trio, with Chris Tordini (bass), Tommy Crane (drums); one track quartet, with Andy Lin (erhu) added
2014*	Stranger	Okeh, Sony Music	Most tracks trio, with Chris Tordini (bass), Tommy Crane (drums); some tracks quartet, with Kurt Rosenwinkel (guitar) added
2019*	Savage Beauty	Sony Music	Most tracks trio, with Chris Tordini (bass), Tommy Crane (drums); some tracks quartet, with Mark Turner (sax) added
2025	Rendezvous: Jazz Meets Beethoven, Tchaikovsky & More	Sony Music Taiwan	All compositions arranged and produced by Jo-Yu Chen. Recorded by David Stoller, October 3 and 4, 2024 at The Samurai Hotel;

12/22/2023* |Walking Through Fear |Single |Sony Music |with Richard Lin (1st Violin), Hsuan-Hao Hsu (2nd Violin), Grace Huang (Viola), Tsao-Lun Lu (Cello) added

02/16/2024* |Schubert & Mozart: Round Midnight |EP |Sony Music with Chris Tordini (bass) and Tommy Crane (drums) added
