= Shlomo Bar =

Israeli composer (born 1943)

Shlomo Bar שְׁלֹמֹה בַּר
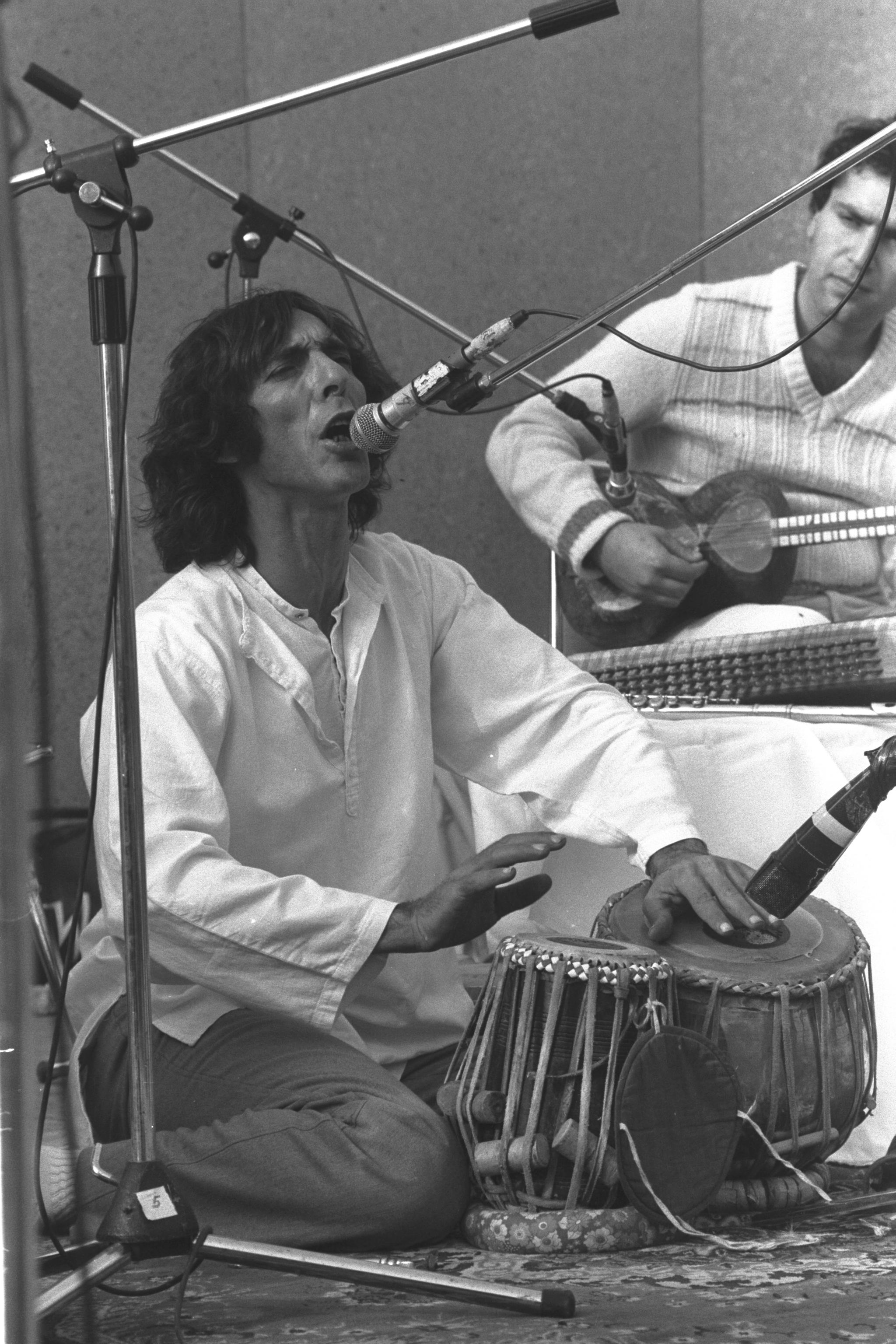

Background information
- Born: June 25, 1943 (age 83); Rabat, Morocco
- Origin: Israel
- Genres: Rock, folk, folk rock, Israeli folk, Israeli rock
- Instruments: Cello, Guitar, Singing
- Years active: 1976–present

Shlomo Bar (Hebrew: שְׁלֹמֹה בַּר; born 25 June 1943) is an Israeli musician, composer, and social activist. He is a pioneer of ethnic music in Israel.

== Biography ==
Shlomo Bar was born in Rabat, Morocco. His family immigrated to Israel when he was six. He learned how to play the darbuka and other ethnic percussion instruments, performing in various small lineups and as a backing musician for artists such as Matti Caspi on tours. In 1976 he played in Yehoshua Sobol and Noa Chelton's Kriza (Nerves), a play about social injustice and discrimination again Mizrahi Jews in Israel. Bar set to music and performed several of Sobol's songs, including "Yeladim Ze Simcha" (Children are joy).

Bar then formed his own group, "Habrera Hativeet" (literally, "Natural Selection," but they call themselves "Natural Gathering") with bassist and producer Yisrael Borochov. The original lineup was Samson Kehimkar, an Indian violin and sitar virtuoso, Miguel Herstein, an American guitarist, the bassist Yisrael Borochov, and Bar on percussion and vocals. Yisrael Borochov had a stark influence on the sound of the group, and before he left had arranged, recorded and produced the first two albums of the band. Disagreements over where the direction of the band was going led him to split from Bar and to form the East West Ensemble.

The first album, "Elei Shorashim" (Origins, or a Return to Roots), combined traditional Moroccan and Yiddish music, with Indian elements and motifs, as well as new renditions of songs by Israeli poets. The songs were long, some of them running for eight minutes, and the subject matter was unusual for the time.

The lineup went through several changes in the 1980s and 90s.

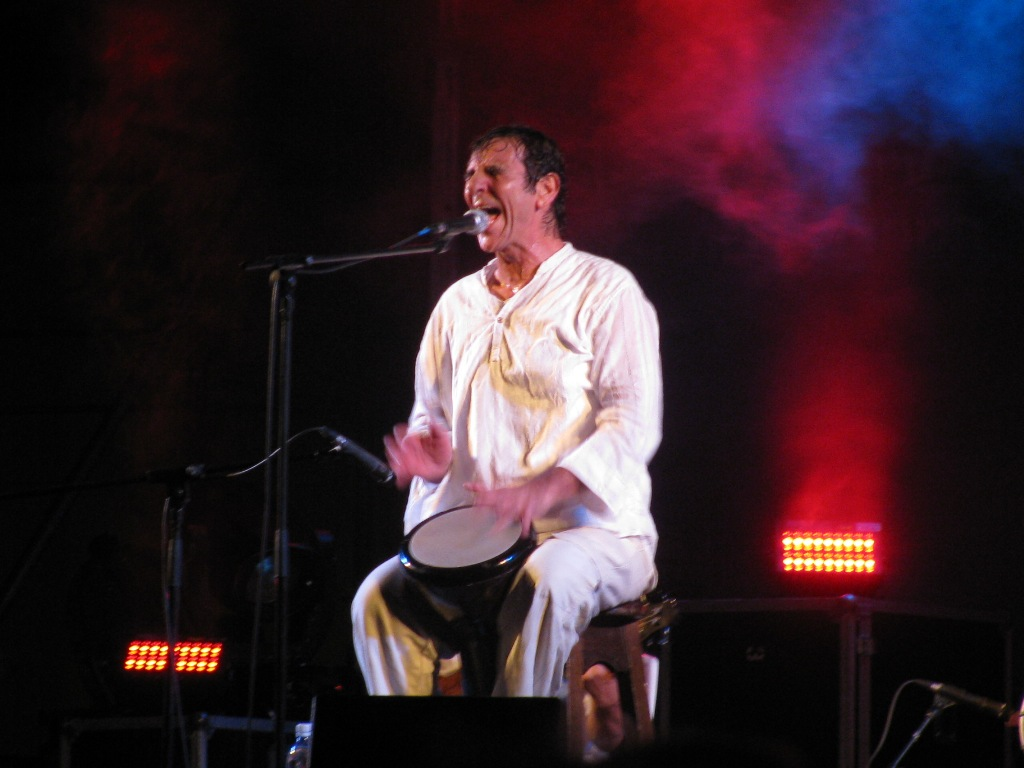

Bar's musical influences are broad, including Bob Dylan and Miles Davis on one hand, and classical Indian music and Jewish liturgy on the other.

== Discography ==
With Habrera Hativeet:

1979 - "Elei Shorashim" (Origins)

1. Tfila - A Prayer
2. Children Are Happiness - Yeladim Ze Simcha
3. In The Village Of Todra - Ezleinu Bikfar Todra
4. Dror Yikra
5. Kotzim - Thorns
6. A Moroccan Wedding - Hatuna Marokait

1980 - "Mechakim LeSamson" (Waiting for Samson)

1. Hassidic Dialogue - Du siah Hassidi
2. Spring - Aviv (Bhairavi)
3. The Love Of Theresa Dimon - Ahavata Shel Theresa Dimon
4. Walking to Caesarea - Halicha LeKeisaria
5. The Dark Girl - Shecharhoret
6. Be True - Heye Davek
7. Alone - Levad

1982 - "Chut Shazur" (Woven Thread)

1. The Market Song - Shir Hashuk
2. Sultanas Lament - Kinat Sultana
3. To God I Shall Hearken - El El Ashacher
4. Who Knew - Mi Yada
5. Bread and Garment - Lehem Beged
6. Haji Baba
7. My Field - Shdemati

1985 - "Mitoch Kelim Shvurim" (Out of Broken Vessels)

1. Thou Art Land - At Adama
2. Danino the Immigrant's Run - Ritzato Shel Haole Danino
3. Or Haganuz
4. Hama
5. My Love Shall Come to His Garden - Yavo Dodi Legano
6. A Song of Degrees - Shir Lamaalot

1988 - "Michutz LaChomot" (Outside the Walls)

1. Who's There - Mi Shama
2. When Shall Zion be Established - Matai Techonan Ir Tzion
3. E'eroch Mahalal Nivi
4. The Flute - Hehalil
5. An Air - Neima
6. Your Fingers - Et Etsbeoteicha

1991 - "Nedudim" (Wandering)

1. A Seed Sleeps - Yashen Lo Garin
2. Naked and Bare - Erom VeEria
3. Walking to Caesarea - Halicha LeKeisaria
4. I Am an Innocent Girl - Ani Tama
5. Seven Sections - Shiv'a Medorim
6. Wandering - Nedudim
7. Three Were Founded - Shlosha Nosdu
8. Honi The Circle Drawer - Honi Hameagel
9. Reaching an Understanding - Hidavrut

1993 - "Peimot Shchorot" (Black Beats)

1. Yafa Ahuvati - Beautiful is My Beloved
2. My Land to The Redeemer - Artzi Lagoel
3. The Desert Speaks - Hamidbar Medaber
4. 10/14 (a percussion piece)
5. And Then As Stream Waters - Veaz Kemei Nahal
6. Hamsa
7. A Song For Peace - Shir Lashalom
8. For Thou Art a Man - Ki Ata Adam
9. Black Beats - Peimot Shhorot (a percussion piece)

1994 - "David U Shlomo" (David and Solomon) - with David D'Or

1. Halleluijah - Haleluya
2. A Voice From the Heavens - Kol Mehashamayim
3. In the Village of Todra - Etzlenu Bikfar Todra
4. In Your Heart - Belibech
5. My Field - Shdemati
6. Don't Cast Me Off - Al Tashlicheni
7. Protect the World - Shmor Al Haolam
8. The Mercy Gate - Shaar Harachamim
9. A Song For Peace - Shir Lashalom
10. The Sailor's Love - Ahuvat Hasapan
11. Instrumental
12. A Prayer - Tfila
13. Comes From Love - Baa Me'ahava
14. Tfila
15. He Will Come - Hu Yavo

1996 - "Yachef" (Barefoot)

1. My Heart - Libi
2. The hope of God - Tikvat Hael
3. Walking to the Palace (Instrumental) - Halicha Laarmon
4. Neglected - Mezulzelet
5. He is Great - Adir Hu
6. The Immigrant Danino's Run - Ritsato Shel Haole Danino
7. A close friend - Haver Karov
8. Batash (Lit. meaning: A meeting between two elements)
9. Reveal The Story - Saper Saper
10. Lover of My Soul - Yedid Nefesh
11. Barefoot - Yahef

2003 - "Maim Ne'emanim" (Faithful Waters) - A Collection

CD1

1. Tfila
2. Yeladim Ze Simcha
3. Etzleinu Bikfar Todra
4. Kinat Sultana
5. Dror Ikra
6. Hatuna Marokait
7. Sheharhoret
8. Ahavata Shel Teresa Dimon
9. Shir Hashuk
10. Hagi Baba
11. Mi Yada
12. Ritzato Shel Haole Danino
13. At Adama
14. El El Ashacher

CD2

1. A Song of Yearning - Shir Kmiha
2. A Japanese Legend - Agada Yapanit
3. Et Etsbeoteicha
4. Hahalil
5. Halicha Lekeisaria
6. Erom Veeria
7. Hamidbar Medaber
8. Shdemati
9. Honi Hameagel
10. Ani Tama
11. Saper Saper
12. Yedid Nefesh
13. Mezulzelet
14. Haver karov
15. Zemer Nouge

2006 - "Ananim Nemuhim" (Low Clouds)

1. Low Clouds - Ananim Nemuchim
2. Genesis (Light) - Or (Bereshit)
3. The Seagulls - HaSchafim
4. And again - Veshuv
5. Da-re
6. Woman's poem - Shirat Isha
7. The Noon-Land's song - Shir Admat Hatzehoraim
8. Circles - Maagalim
9. Formless and Void - Tohu Vavohu

2010 - "Besod Tfilat Arar" (In a Secret of Solitary Prayer)
