= Beyond (Joshua Redman album) =

Studio album by Joshua Redman
- Released: April 4, 2000
- Recorded: May 1999
- Studio: Avatar, New York City
- Genre: Jazz, post-bop, neo-bop
- Length: 73:33
- Label: Warner Bros.
- Producer: Joshua Redman

Joshua Redman chronology
Timeless Tales (For Changing Times) (1998)	Beyond (2000)	Passage of Time (2001)

Professional ratings
Review scores
Source	Rating
AllMusic	3.5/5 stars
The Buffalo News	4/4 stars
Penguin Guide to Jazz	3/4 stars
Tom Hull	A−

Beyond is a 2000 studio album by American jazz saxophonist Joshua Redman released through Warner Bros. Records.

== Background ==
The album contains 10 originals. Critics mention that the reason to Beyond's success is the group of musicians whom Redman invited for the recording: pianist Aaron Goldberg, bassist Reuben Rogers, and drummer Gregory Hutchinson. Says Redman, "We found a common ground to express ourselves as individuals within a group... It's all about camaraderie, chemistry, creativity and commitment. It was my goal to make this album a statement of our collective identity, so I conceived all these songs with Aaron, Reuben and Greg in mind." Redman also mentioned, "Just as always, the music here is performed with honest expression... "I'm not deliberately trying to write material that's difficult to play... There's a balance between complexity and simplicity, between formal sophistication and emotional directness."

== Reception ==
John Murph of JazzTimes wrote "With all the extracurricular glamour that surrounds Joshua Redman, sometimes it's hard to focus on Redman the jazz musician, rather than Redman the ubiquitous, fashion-conscious celebrity. Redman's latest album, Beyond, doesn't depart sonically from his previous works, its compositional zeal suggests he's indeed on his way to living up to all the hype." David Adler of All About Jazz added "Although it is probably Redman's finest album to date, Beyond still doesn't rise to the level of true greatness in the field of composition. It would be hard for even a genius to measure up to the industry hype that has surrounded Redman for nearly a decade. But this makes it even more essential that critics evaluate Redman's work just as they would that of any other brilliant and hard-working, yet far more obscure, figure on the scene. This is not to take anything away from Redman, but rather to keep matters in their proper perspective."

Geoffrey Himes of The Washington Post commented "Because Redman is working with familiar partners and because he has thought these pieces through, they boast a logical, cohesive development that few modern jazz recordings can match." Jeff Simon of The Buffalo News stated, "Beyond, in fact, may be the best record yet by Joshua Redman."

== Track listing ==
All tracks are written by Joshua Redman.

No.	Title	Length
1.	"Courage (Asymmetric Aria)"	7:32
2.	"Belonging (Lopsided Lullaby)"	5:48
3.	"Neverend"	4:26
4.	"Leap of Faith"	9:03
5.	"Balance"	9:05
6.	"Twilight ... and Beyond"	11:00
7.	"Stoic Revolutions"	6:11
8.	"Suspended Emanations"	6:18
9.	"Last Rites of Rock 'n' Roll"	7:03
10.	"A Life?"	6:52
Total length:		73:33

== Personnel ==
Musicians

- Joshua Redman – tenor, alto and soprano Saxophone
- Mark Turner – tenor sax (track 4)
- Aaron Goldberg – piano
- Reuben Rogers – bass
- Gregory Hutchinson – drums

Production

- Joshua Redman – producer
- James Farber – associate producer, engineer
- Greg Calbi – engineer (mastering)
- ndrea Yankovsky – engineer (assistant)
- Anthony Gorman – engineer (assistant)
- Paul Boothe – production manager (production assistant)
- Wilkins Management, Inc. – management
- Frank Olinsky – art direction
- Frank W. Ockenfels III – photography
- Paul Silver – photography (of band)

== Media Appearances ==
Two of Joshua Redman's songs "Courage (Asymmetric Aria)" and "Balance" were featured on The Weather Channel's "Local Forecast" segments.
