= Samson Kehimkar =

Jewish Indian musician

Samson Kehimkar (Hebrew: שמשון כחימקר) was a Jewish violinist and sitar player from India. One of the pioneers of ethnic and world music in Israel. Before emigrating in 1976, he played in Indian classical orchestras, film and pop bands. One of the founding members of "Habrera Hativit" (literal translation: The Natural Selection, known in English as The Gathering). Shlomo Bar considered Kehimkar to be his mentor, both musically and otherwise. He died in 2007, after battling severe diabetes for years, in the course of which both legs were amputated.

His son, the cricketer Benzi Kehimkar, died shortly after.
