= East Coast Love Affair =

Live album by Kurt Rosenwinkel
- Released: 1996
- Recorded: July 10 and July 24, 1996
- Venue: Smalls Jazz Club
- Genre: Jazz
- Length: 48:31
- Label: Fresh Sound New Talent
- Producer: Kurt Rosenwinkel, Jorge Rossy

Kurt Rosenwinkel chronology
East Coast Love Affair (1996)	Intuit (1999)

Professional ratings
Review scores
Source	Rating
AllMusic	4/5 stars
The Penguin Guide to Jazz Recordings	3.5/4 stars

East Coast Love Affair is the debut solo album by the jazz guitarist Kurt Rosenwinkel.

== Track listing ==
No.	Title	Writer(s)	Length
1.	"East Coast Love Affair"	Kurt Rosenwinkel	8:16
2.	"All or Nothing at All"	Arthur Altman / Jack Lawrence	6:25
3.	"Turn Out the Stars"	Bill Evans	5:24
4.	"Pannonica"	Thelonious Monk	3:35
5.	"Lazy Bird"	John Coltrane	4:30
6.	"'Round About Midnight"	Thelonious Monk	9:12
7.	"Little White Lies"	Walter Donaldson	3:59
8.	"B Blues"	Kurt Rosenwinkel	7:10

== Personnel ==
- Kurt Rosenwinkel – Guitar
- Avishai Cohen – Bass
- Jorge Rossy – Drums
