= Ben Street =

American jazz double bassist

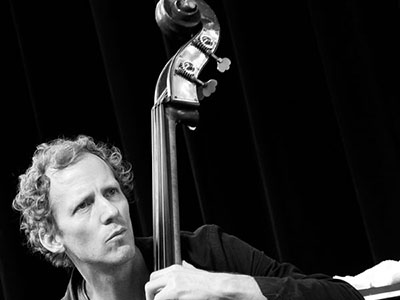

Background information
- Born: July 18, 1965 (age 61); Maine, U.S.
- Genres: Avant-garde, free jazz
- Occupation: Musician
- Instrument: Double bass
- Labels: GM, Tzadik

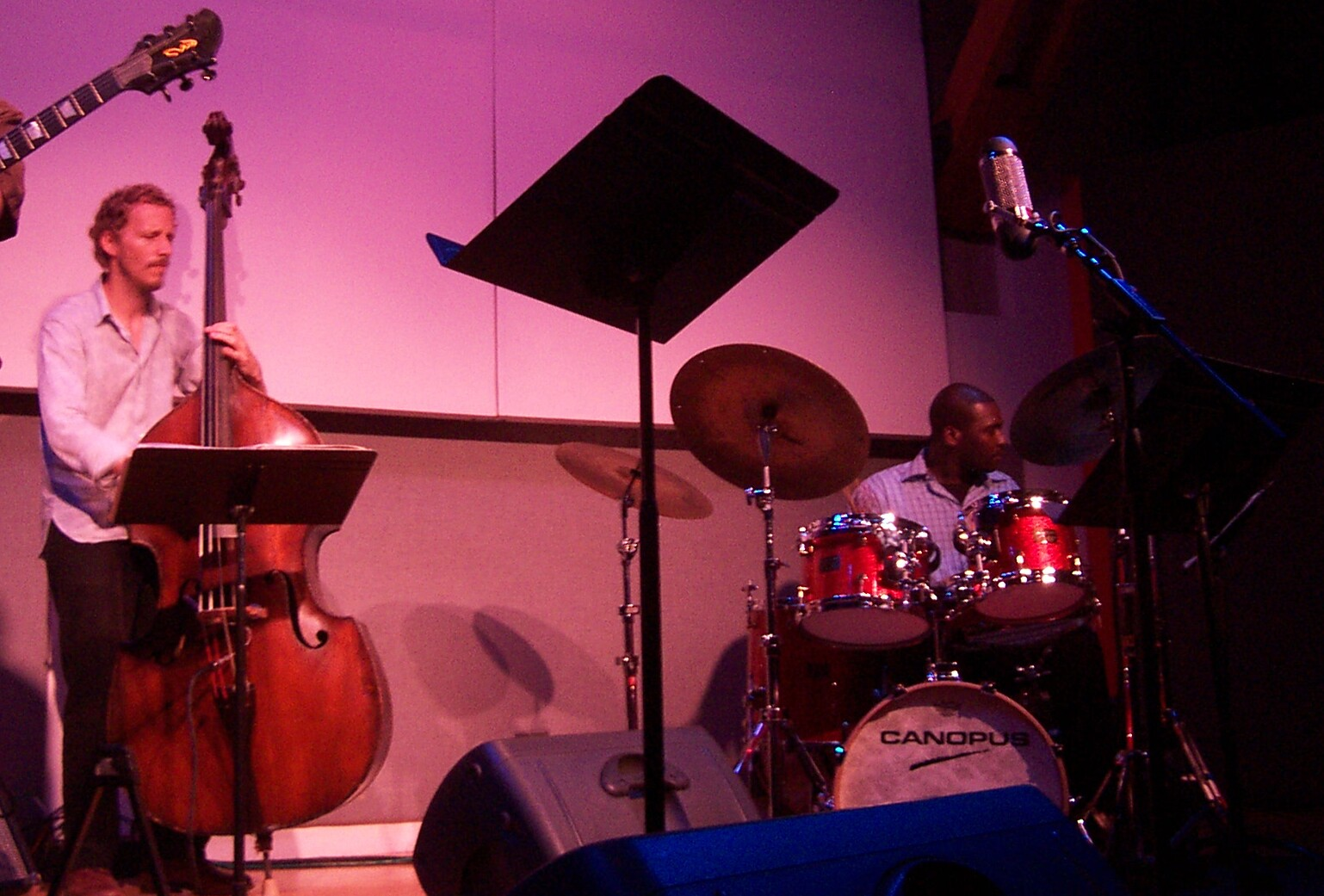
Kurt Rosenwinkel, Ben Street, and Rodney Green

Ben Street is an American jazz double bassist. Street has performed and recorded with many renowned artists, including John Scofield, Kurt Rosenwinkel, Mark Turner, Ben Monder, Michael Eckroth, Sam Rivers, Billy Hart, Danilo Perez, Aaron Parks, and Adam Cruz, among others.

He studied the acoustic bass with former Weather Report bassist Miroslav Vitouš.

He is the son of saxophonist and saxophone mouthpiece maker Bill Street and is a native of Maine.

Ben attended New England Conservatory of Music.

== Discography ==
With Anthony Coleman

- Morenica (Tzadik, 1998)
- Our Beautiful Garden is Open (Tzadik, 2002)

With Kurt Rosenwinkel

- The Enemies of Energy (Verve, 2000)
- The Next Step (Verve, 2001)
- Heartcore (Verve, 2003)

With Jakob Bro

- The Stars Are All New Songs (Loveland, 2008)
- Balladeering (Loveland, 2009)

With Andrew Cyrille

- The Declaration of Musical Independence (ECM, 2016)
- The News (ECM, 2021)

With Andrew Cyrille, Søren Kjœrgaard

- Optics (Ilk, 2008)
- Open Opus (Ilk, 2010)
- Femklang (Ilk, 2012)

With Tom Harrell

- Infinity (HighNote, 2019)

With Billy Hart

- Billy Hart Quartet (HighNote, 2006)
- All Our Reasons (ECM, 2012)
- One Is the Other (ECM, 2014)
- Multidirectional (Smoke Sessions, 2023)

With Albert Heath, Ethan Iverson

- Live at Smalls (SmallsLive, 2010)
- Tootie's Tempo (Sunnyside, 2013)
- Philadelphia Beat (Sunnyside, 2015)

With Ben Monder

- Dust (Arabesque, 1997)

With Orange Then Blue

- 1999 Hold the Elevator: Live in Europe & Other Haunts

With Danilo Pérez

- 2003 ...Till Then
- 2005 Live at the Jazz Showcase
- 2010 Providencia

With Sam Rivers

- 2005 Purple Violets
- 2005 Violet Violets

With Chiara Civello

- 2005 Last Quarter Moon
- 2007 The Space Between

With Lage Lund

- 2010 Unlikely Stories
- 2012 Live at Smalls
- 2013 Foolhardy
- 2015 Idlewild

With David Sanchez

- 2004 Coral
- 2008 Cultural Survival

With Yelena Eckemoff

- 2016 Leaving Everything Behind
- 2023 Lonely Man and His Fish

With Others

- 1997 Dust, Ben Monder
- 1998 La Bikina, Edward Simon
- 2000 Love Decides, Jane Olivor
- 2002 Rainy Day Assembly, Tess Wiley
- 2003 Friendship, Perico Sambeat
- 2005 A Moment's Glance, Julie Hardy
- 2005 Journey to Donnafugata, Salvatore Bonafede
- 2005 Place and Time, Anat Cohen
- 2006 Melancolia, Manuel Valera
- 2006 When You're There, Frank LoCrasto
- 2007 Keep Your Sunny Side Up, Bill Carrothers
- 2007 The Timeless Now, Dayna Stephens
- 2007 Unspoken Dialogue, Bobby Selvaggio
- 2009 Angelica, Francesco Cafiso
- 2009 Open Season, Ralph Alessi
- 2010 All My Friends Are Here, Arif Mardin
- 2012 Three Things of Beauty, Bruce Barth
- 2012 Continuum, David Virelles (Pi)
- 2015 Kikuchi/Street/Morgan/Osgood, Masabumi Kikuchi, Thomas Morgan, Kresten Osgood (Ilk)
- 2015 Space Squid, Bill Stewart
- 2016 Leaving Everything Behind, Yelena Eckemoff (L&H)
- 2017 Find the Way, with Aaron Parks and Billy Hart (ECM)
- 2019 Common Practice, Ethan Iverson (ECM)
