= Passage of Time =

Studio album by Joshua Redman Quartet
- Released: March 27, 2001
- Recorded: June 2000
- Studio: Avatar, River Sound, Sterling Sound (all in New York City)
- Genre: Jazz, Post-bop
- Length: 54:04
- Label: Warner Bros.
- Producer: Joshua Redman

Joshua Redman chronology
Beyond (2000)	Passage of Time (2001)	Yaya^{3} (2002)

Professional ratings
Review scores
Source	Rating
Allmusic	3/5 stars
Vibe	4/5 stars
Tom Hull	B+
The Penguin Guide to Jazz Recordings	3.5/4 stars

Passage of Time is a studio album by American jazz saxophonist Joshua Redman. The record was released on March 27, 2001 by Warner Bros. label.

== Background ==
In this album, Joshua Redman strings together 8 different original compositions into a continuous piece for the first time, with pianist Aaron Goldberg, bassist Reuben Rogers, and drummer Gregory Hutchinson (part of Redman's Quartet) as partners in this project. The same quartet released the album Beyond in 2000.

Redman states, "One of my goals as a jazz musician is to construct a meaningful narrative. Not a literal or analytical narrative, but an emotional narrative of sound. That's how I would describe Passage Of Time: a piece of music that says something from start to finish. It tells a story. It has themes and motifs that become topics for group discussion. It's a long story, consisting of smaller ones, discovered and articulated during the music-making process. The band speaks through conversations, and our dialogues give the music feeling, purpose and direction."

== Reception ==
Richard S. Ginell of Allmusic stated "With this recording, Joshua Redman attempts a long-form composition for the first time, a series of eight numbers that form a cycle of sorts. The promotional buzz claimed that Redman was taking stock of his music ten years after winning the Thelonious Monk competition, the event that had the effect of launching him full-blown into the big time. Whether or not that's true, there is a predominantly reflective, thoughtful tone about this quartet session, split between written-out passages and flat-out improvisations. The whole thing runs for a continuous yet comfortable 52 minutes, an extension of the interlude idea that Redman played with on Timeless Tales... That said, it's hard to get really worked up about much of the material presented here; there isn't much that really touches or inflames the listener in a deep way. It's a summing up -- a coherent, mature statement in a familiar mainstream language." Ron Wynn of JazzTimes commented "On Passage of Time, Redman sounds free of having to approximate a pop hit or having to create something fresh within a shopworn concept like a tribute album; he and his mates provide music that challenges and confronts the listener. More records like this one will go a long way toward dissuading those who feel Redman’s stature is more the product of clever marketing than that of a major improviser."

== Track listing ==
All tracks are written by Joshua Redman.

No.	Title	Length
1.	"Before"	1:50
2.	"Free Speech, Phase I – Declaration"	7:05
3.	"Free Speech, Phase II – Discussion"	4:29
4.	"Our Minuet"	8:28
5.	"Bronze"	8:27
6.	"Time"	10:38
7.	"Enemies Within"	9:23
8.	"After"	3:44
Total length:		54:04

== Personnel ==
Musicians

- Joshua Redman – Tenor Saxophone
- Aaron Goldberg – Piano
- Reuben Rogers – Bass
- Gregory Hutchinson – Drums
