= Intuit (Kurt Rosenwinkel album) =

Studio album by Kurt Rosenwinkel
- Released: 1999
- Recorded: August 14–15, 1998
- Studio: Acoustic Recording Studio, Brooklyn, New York
- Genre: Jazz
- Length: 69:55
- Label: Criss Cross
- Producer: Gerry Teekens

Kurt Rosenwinkel chronology
East Coast Love Affair (1996)	Intuit (1999)	The Enemies of Energy (2000)

Professional ratings
Review scores
Source	Rating
AllMusic	3/5 stars
The Penguin Guide to Jazz Recordings	3/4 stars

Intuit is an album by the American jazz guitarist Kurt Rosenwinkel.

== Track listing ==
No.	Title	Writer(s)	Length
1.	"How Deep Is the Ocean"	Irving Berlin	9:25
2.	"Conception I"	George Shearing	5:17
3.	"Darn That Dream"	Eddie DeLange / Jimmy Van Heusen	8:14
4.	"Dewey Square"	Charlie Parker	7:37
5.	"When Sunny Gets Blue"	Jack Segal / Marvin Fisher	7:48
6.	"Sippin' at Bells"	Charlie Parker	3:53
7.	"Epiphany"	Michael Kanan	8:23
8.	"Segment"	Charlie Parker	5:45
9.	"Summertime"	George Gershwin	7:22
10.	"Conception II"	George Shearing	6:11

== Personnel ==
- Kurt Rosenwinkel – guitar
- Michael Kanan – piano
- Joe Martin – double bass
- Tim Pleasant – drums
