= Itamar Borochov =

Israeli jazz trumpeter

Itamar Borochov (Hebrew: איתמר בורוכוב; born 1984) is an Israeli jazz trumpeter.

Borochov was born in Tel Aviv into a musical family, but was educated in Jaffa. His father is composer/arranger Yisrael Borochov and his brother Avri plays double bass professionally. As a child, Borochov learned the guitar and taught himself to play the blues, inspired by the film 'The Blues Brothers'. Switching to trumpet, he began to play jazz after hearing Louis Armstrong, Duke Ellington and Miles Davis. He played local gigs in Tel Aviv, in his own band and in a group called Funk Hapoalim. At the same time, he began to work as a studio musician, recording with Efrat Gosh and Knesiyat Hasechel among others.

Borochov studied at the New School in New York from 2007. In 2010, he joined the group Yemen Blues, recording three albums. He released his own debut 'Outset' in 2014. He was signed to French label Laborie Jazz in 2016, releasing two albums - 'Boomerang' in 2016 and 'Blue Nights' in 2019. 'Blue Nights' received critical acclaim including 5-star reviews by Downbeat Magazine and UK Vibe, as well as being named in AllMusic.com's best albums of the year in both the World Music and Jazz categories.

Borochov has led his own bands on tours in North America, Europe and Asia and performed at prestigious venues such as the Lincoln Center, The Kennedy Center, SummerStage at Central Park, Blue Note NY, Ronnie Scott's Jazz Club, Bimhuis, Flagey and international festivals including Roskilde, Montreal Jazz Festival, Ottawa Jazz Festival, London Jazz Festival, Moscow Jazz Festival, Tel Aviv Jazz Festival, Red Sea Jazz Festival, Jazz à Liège & Shanghai World Music Festival. The Itamar Borochov Quartet was chosen to showcase at WOMEX 2019 in Tampere, Finland.

== Discography ==
- Outset (Real Bird, 2014)
- Boomerang (Laborie Jazz, 2016)
- Blue Nights (Laborie Jazz, 2019)
- Arba (Greenleaf Music, 2023)
