= Proximity (album) =

Studio album by Andrew Cyrille and Bill McHenry
- Released: September 30, 2016
- Recorded: November 16 and 17, 2014
- Studio: Brooklyn Recording, Brooklyn, NY
- Genre: Jazz
- Label: Sunnyside Records; SSC 1429
- Producer: Andrew Cyrille, Bill McHenry

Andrew Cyrille chronology
The Declaration of Musical Independence (2016)	Proximity (2016)	Lebroba (2018)

Proximity is an album by drummer Andrew Cyrille and saxophonist Bill McHenry. It was recorded in November 2014 at Brooklyn Recording in Brooklyn, NY, and was released by Sunnyside Records on September 30, 2016.

== Reception ==
Professional ratings
Review scores
Source	Rating
DownBeat	3/5 stars
All About Jazz #1	4/5 stars
All About Jazz #2	3.5/5 stars
PopMatters	7/10 stars

DownBeat's Carlo Wolff stated that McHenry and Cyrille "make passionate music," and wrote that the album "conjures a conversation you'd love to join." He called "Fabula" "a spasming tune... that threatens to fall all over itself but miraculously remains upright," on which "percussion and saxophone seem of one mind."

In a review for All About Jazz, Budd Kopman wrote: "the session is very atmospheric and concentrated... The sound is wide and large, rather than sharp and concentrated, but this diffuse sound paradoxically is highly focused... The rather sparse music of Proximity is... captivating and actually a very emotional experience that feels to be almost like being there." In a second review for the same publication, Glenn Astarita commented: "McHenry's full-bodied tenor sound is occasionally mellowed via his light-hearted dialogues with Cyrille's poetic and overtly melodic fills, countered by many bristling improv segments. Even without a bassist, the musicians still manage to sustain a tightknit working relationship along with a capacious backdrop... these jazz masters transmit a compassionate and indisputably upbeat mindset from start to finish."

Writing for PopMatters, Will Layman stated: "Proximity... is... more entertaining than most jazz recordings. Both of these musicians are rich in wit and play, so every second of their interaction is like a chase between cat and mouse. They dash and dip, push and pull... Highly recommended."

In an article for NPR Music, Kevin Whitehead remarked: "Proximity is all about the drums and their melodic potential... his trap set is fully exposed and saxophonist Bill McHenry doesn't get between it and us. Cyrille's tour de force is his drum-set version of Leadbelly's dance ditty 'Green Corn.' The clackety playing on the rims harks back to early jazz great Baby Dodds."

== Track listing ==
1. "Bedouin Woman" (Cyrille, McHenry) – 3:02
2. "Fabula" (Don Moye) – 2:49
3. "Drum Song For Leadbelly" (Cyrille) – 4:22
4. "Drum Man Cyrille" (Muhal Richard Abrams) – 3:10
5. "Proximity" (Cyrille) – 5:03
6. "Let Me Tell You This" (Cyrille, McHenry) – 3:21
7. "Broken Heart" (Cyrille, McHenry) – 0:56
8. "Aquatic Life" (Cyrille, McHenry) – 5:09
9. "Double Dutch" (Cyrille, McHenry) – 3:02
10. "Seasons" (Cyrille, McHenry) – 6:14
11. "Dervish" (Cyrille, McHenry) – 1:35
12. "To Be Continued..." (Max Koslow) – 0:05

== Personnel ==
- Andrew Cyrille – drums
- Bill McHenry – tenor saxophone
