= Olivia Trummer =

German jazz musician (born 1985)

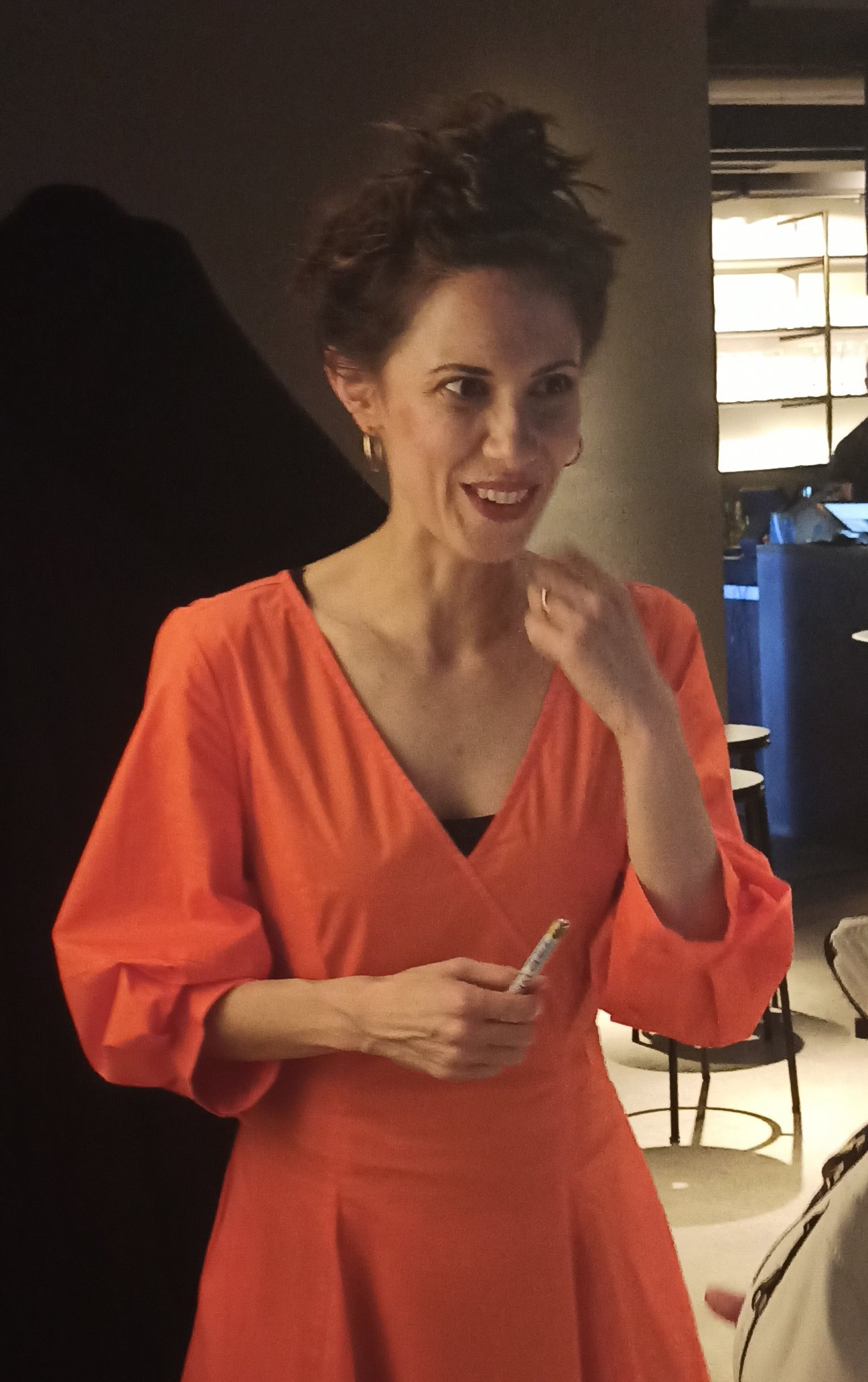
Olivia Trummer in the Nica Jazz Club, Hamburg, Juli 2025

Olivia Trummer (born 12 June 1985 in Stuttgart) is a German jazz pianist, vocalist and composer.

== Biography ==
Trummer was raised in a family of musicians and started to play piano when she was 3 years old. Since 2003 she studied jazz piano as well as classical piano at the Hochschule für Musik und Darstellende Kunst Stuttgart. All courses she graduated with honors. In 2008/2009 she went to pursue a master's degree at the Manhattan School of Music. During her studies in 2004 and 2006, she was commissioned to compose music for theater.

Olivia Trummer is mostly seen performing as a soloist or with her trio, the "Olivia Trummer Trio", performing mostly her own English (and sometimes German) jazz songs as well as her own arrangements of jazz standards and classical works, such as Mozart, Bach, Beethoven or Ligeti. Since her third album Nobody Knows the pianist is also heard as a singer, where she promotes the jazz song "by ludicrous melody jumps and bold Scat-coloratura in the Lied area.“ She gave concerts in the Carnegie Hall, in Schloss Elmau and in the Liederhalle Stuttgart as well as jazz festivals in Germany, England, Ireland, Italy, the Czech Republic, Russia, Japan, China and the USA. Between 2009 and 2012 she performed with the Ensemble Eichendorff (with Claudio Puntin, Libor Šíma as well as Bodek Janke), with the band East Drive and in duo with Bodek Janke. From 2014-2016 she played concerts in duo with the Swiss vibraphone player Jean-Lou Treboux, presenting the first edition of her project series "Classical To Jazz". Since autumn 2016 she has been touring the world as a member of the band "Caipi" of Kurt Rosenwinkel. Since 2016, Olivia Trummer is particularly active in the Italian jazz scene, collaborating with Italian artists like Nicola Angelucci, Fabrizio Bosso, Rosario Bonaccorso, Luciano Biondini, Gabriele Mirabassi, Mario Biondi and many more.

Since 2024, she is collaborating with the American producer legend Titelman, a 3-time Grammy-award winner, famous for his work with artists like Clapton, Khan, Jones and Newman. With him as a producer, Olivia recorded her solo album "Like Water" 2024 in New York. It was released in June 2025 on the label Warner Music Italy.

== Honors ==
She was a scholarship holder of the DAAD in 2008/2009 and received grants from the Kunststiftung Baden-Württemberg and the Bruno Frey Foundation in 2010. Her album Westwind was referred to as excellent on the leaderboard of the third quarter of 2008 at Preis der Deutschen Schallplattenkritik. In 2014 she was the first national advertised by the city of Ingolstadt Ingolstädter Jazzpreis 2014, and in 2019, she was awarded with the "Jazz-Award Baden-Württemberg", one of the most prestigious jazz awards in Germany. Her album "Like Water" (2025) was chosen among the 10 best jazz albums of 2025 by BR Klassik, and appeared in the Top-Ten-favorite list of the magazine Jazz thing, chosen by the journalists. The album also received "Editor's Choice" and 4 stars by the British magazine "jazzwise".

In the classical field, she became the second prizewinner at the classical International Piano Competition Palma D’Oro in Italy in 2008. Moreover, in her early years, she was honored five times at Jugend musiziert as a federal award winner.

== Discography ==
- Nach Norden (Neuklang 2006)
- Westwind (Neuklang, 2008)
- Nobody Knows (Neuklang, 2010)
- Poesiealbum (Neuklang 2011)
- Fly Now (Contemplate Music, 2014)
- Classical to Jazz One (Neuklang, 2015)
- Studiokonzert (Neuklang, 2018)
- The Hawk (Flavoredtune, 2019)
- For You (Warner Music Italy 2022)
- Dialogue's Delight (Warner Music Italy, 2023)
- Like Water (Warner Music Italy, 2025)
