= The Next Step (Kurt Rosenwinkel album) =

Studio album by Kurt Rosenwinkel
- Released: 2001
- Recorded: May 12 – Jun 27, 2000
- Genre: Jazz
- Length: 61:56
- Label: Verve
- Producer: Kurt Rosenwinkel, Jason Olaine

Kurt Rosenwinkel chronology
The Enemies of Energy (2000)	The Next Step (2001)	Heartcore (2003)

Professional ratings
Review scores
Source	Rating
Allmusic	4.5/5 stars
The Penguin Guide to Jazz Recordings	3.5/4 stars

The Next Step is Kurt Rosenwinkel's fourth album as a band leader. It is his second release on Verve, and regarded as a major step in his creative evolution. Rosenwinkel says of the album: "It represents the culmination of many life phases for me. Some of these phases started ten years ago and have finally found resolution in this record. It represents the next step in my music and in my life". The album debuts a number of compositions which would become staples of his live performances, and would also be re-recorded on his albums Deep Song and Star of Jupiter. The material was developed by the band during their frequent gigs at Smalls Jazz Club in New York City. Mitch Borden, the club's owner recalled that, "Kurt Rosenwinkel's band played with such dramatic fire, that it would consume everyone present". The album features several songs with alternate guitar tunings, and also showcases Kurt Rosenwinkel's piano playing on the title track.

== Critical reception ==
The Penguin Guide to Jazz described it as having "a Tristano-ite logic and cool-headedness. There's nothing to listen for except rigorous thought and intensity; it's abstruse, but entirely coherent. An extraordinary record for a major record company to release."

Peter Margasak in The Chicago Reader wrote that Rosenwinkel's "lovely originals on [The Next Step] exploit the tight ensemble approach of his quartet...The music is filled with shadowy effects, from the way Turner’s contrapuntal lines interlock with the guitarist’s rapid melodic flurries to the way Rosenwinkel underlines his own solos with sweet, wordless vocals. The deft rhythm section percolates, both in sync with and against the grain of all that twisty foreground material, giving the music a rigorous but gorgeous richness." Ben Ratliff in The New York Times described the music as "the epitome of sensitive, modest-tempered art, the kind that doesn't assert itself until the moment is right."

Years later, Nate Chinen would write that Rosenwinkel "made a personal breakthrough here — crafting a statement that has deeply informed more than one subsequent wave of the modern mainstream...Together, on the album, [the quartet] sound both reflective and radiant. The influence of their style, floaty and glowing and alert, has been so pervasive in recent years that it can be easy to forget how new it felt in 2001."

== Track listing ==
All compositions by Kurt Rosenwinkel

1. "Zhivago" – 9:04
2. "Minor Blues" – 5:54
3. "A Shifting Design" – 7:11
4. "Path of the Heart" – 6:15
5. "Filters" – 7:43
6. "Use of Light" – 9:17
7. "The Next Step" – 10:01
8. "A Life Unfolds" – 6:31

== Personnel ==
- Kurt Rosenwinkel – guitar, piano (track 7)
- Mark Turner – tenor saxophone
- Ben Street – bass
- Jeff Ballard – drums
