= Roxana Amed =

Argentine jazz singer (1963–2026)

- Amed in 2022

Background information
- Born: 5 October 1963; Buenos Aires, Argentina
- Died: 25 October 2026 (aged 63) Miami, Florida, U.S.
- Education: Fundación Universidad del Cine
- Genre: Jazz
- Occupation: Singer
- Label: Sony Music Latin
- Spouse: Daniel Arano

Roxana Amed (5 October 1963 – 25 October 2026) was an Argentine jazz singer.

== Early life and career ==
Amed was born in Buenos Aires on 5 October 1963. At an early age, she began studying piano, and she attended the National Conservatory of Music in her hometown, studying classical piano. She also attended Fundación Universidad del Cine, earning her degree in filmmaking. She performed as a jazz singer in the 1990s, and in 2000, she sang the title theme for the El Trece television program Vulnerables, for which she won a Martín Fierro Award in the category Best Soundtrack for Television in 2001.

Later in her career, Amed signed with the record label Sony Music Latin, and in 2004, she released her debut album Limbo. In 2006, she released the album Entremundos, and in 2010, she collaborated with pianist Adrián Iaies and she released the album Cinemateca finlandesa. In 2013, she collaborated with composer Frank Carlberg and she released the album La sombra de su sombra. In 2021, she released the album Ontology, and was nominated for two Latin Grammy Awards in the categories Best Latin Jazz/Jazz Album and Best Arrangement (for "Blue in Green").

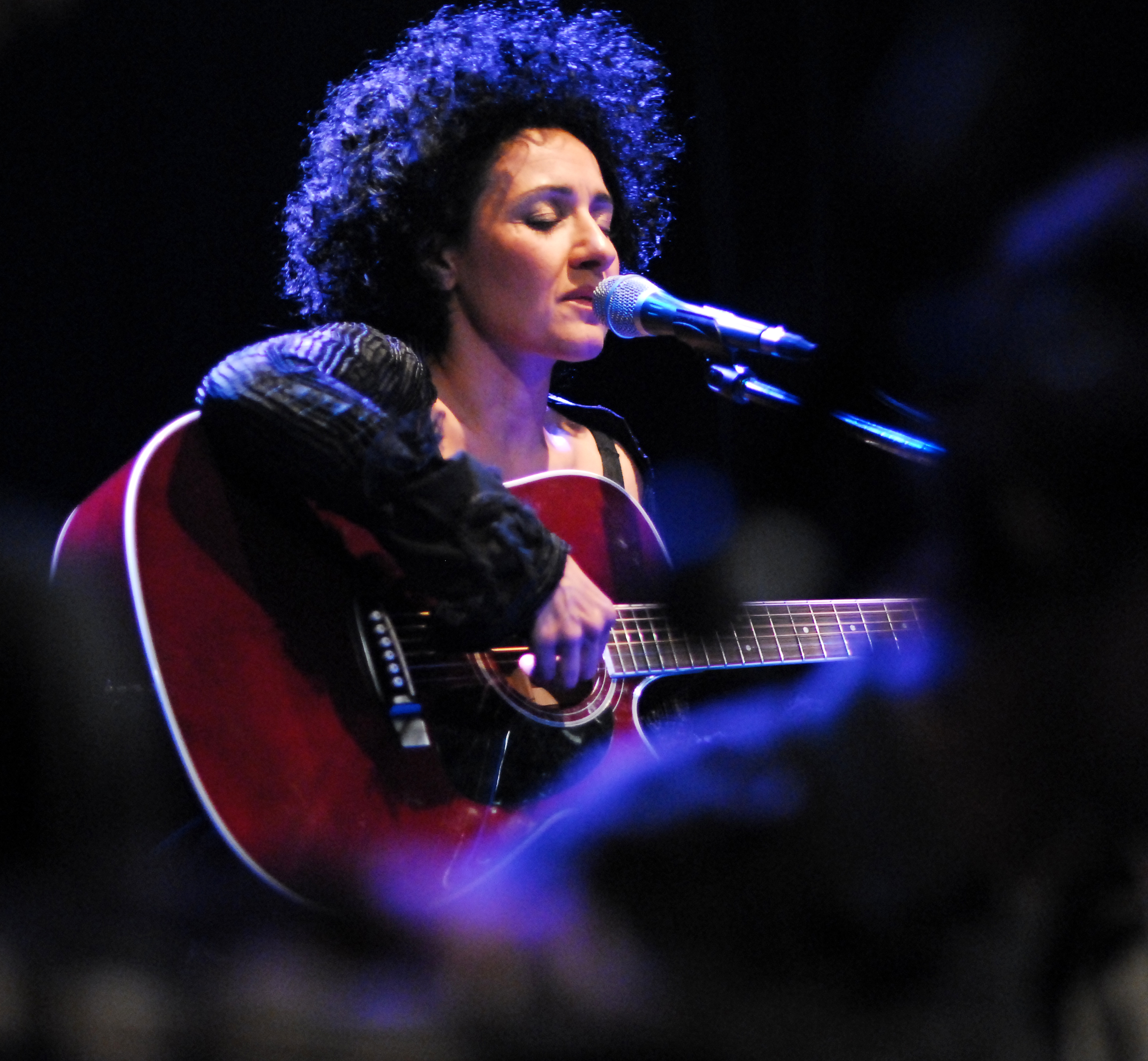
Amed in 2007

In 2022, Amed released the album Unánime, for which she won a Gardel Award in the category Best Jazz Album, and was again nominated for a Latin Grammy Award. In 2023, she released the album Los trabajos y las noches, and in 2024, she again collaborated with Carlberg and she released the album Becoming Human. In 2025, she released her final album Todos los Fuegos, for which she was nominated for a Gardel Award in 2026. Aside from her jazz singing career, she taught at the University of Miami's Frost School of Music.

== Personal life and death ==
Amed in 2019

Amed was married to Daniel Arano, a music and television producer. Their marriage lasted until Amed's death in 2026.

Amed died in Miami, Florida, on 25 October 2026, at the age of 63.
