= Heartcore (Kurt Rosenwinkel album) =

Studio album by Kurt Rosenwinkel
- Released: August 23, 2003
- Recorded: 2001–2003
- Genre: Jazz, fusion
- Length: 67:47
- Label: Verve Records
- Producer: Kurt Rosenwinkel, Q-Tip

Kurt Rosenwinkel chronology
| The Next Step (2001) | Heartcore (2003) | Deep Song (2005) |

Professional ratings
Review scores
| Source | Rating |
|---|---|
| Allmusic | 4.5/5 stars |
| The Penguin Guide to Jazz Recordings | 2.5/4 stars |

Heartcore is Kurt Rosenwinkel's fifth album as a band leader. The album was fully produced by Rosenwinkel and Q-Tip of popular hip-hop group A Tribe Called Quest. The album is a departure musically from Rosenwinkel's previous work, as he contributes keyboard, drums, and voice, at times creating soundscapes completely on his own in his personal studio. Says Rosenwinkel, "There is a place, musically, that’s above the categories. This record – it’s jazz. And it’s much more". While much of the album features varied instrumentation and personnel, a few tracks rely on a live performance aspect, reminding the listener of the connection to the jazz tradition. Rosenwinkel cites the influence of Arnold Schoenberg in the harmonic textural construction on Heartcore.

== Track listing ==
1. "Heartcore" – 8:39
2. "Blue Line" – 6:11
3. "All the Way to Rajasthan" – 6:59
4. "Your Vision" – 8:36
5. "Interlude" – 2:45
6. "Our Secret World" – 6:13
7. "Dream/Memory?" – 3:26
8. "Love in the Modern World" – 8:15
9. "dcba//>>" – 7:52
10. "Thought About You" – 5:44
11. "Tone Poem" (Rosenwinkel, Nathan Street, Ben Street) – 3:07

== Personnel ==
- Kurt Rosenwinkel – Guitar, Keyboards, Drums, Programming
- Mark Turner – Tenor Saxophone (1, 2, 6, 9), Bass Clarinet (11)
- Ben Street – Bass (2, 3, 6, 8, 11)
- Jeff Ballard – Drums (2, 3, 6, 9, 11)

With:

- Ethan Iverson – Piano (9), Keyboards (6)
- Andrew D'Angelo - Bass clarinet (4)
- Mariano Gil - Flute (5, 8)
