= Deep Song (album) =

Studio album by Kurt Rosenwinkel
- Released: March 1, 2005
- Genre: Jazz
- Length: 74:10
- Label: Verve
- Producer: Kurt Rosenwinkel, Anders Chan-Tidemann, Joshua Redman, James Farber

Kurt Rosenwinkel chronology
Heartcore (2003)	Deep Song (2005)	The Remedy (2008)

Professional ratings
Review scores
Source	Rating
Allmusic	4/5 stars
The Penguin Guide to Jazz Recordings	3/4 stars

Deep Song is Kurt Rosenwinkel's sixth album as a band leader. The album features a new band, composed of pianist Brad Mehldau, tenor saxophonist Joshua Redman, bassist Larry Grenadier, and drummers Ali Jackson and Jeff Ballard. While the all-star cast appearing on the record was seen as an attempt at commercial success, the players had all previously worked together and were part of the underground jazz scene in New York City during the 1990s. Among the tracks on Deep Song are two jazz standards, "If I Should Lose You" and "Deep Song". Of the eight original compositions on Deep Song, three were previously recorded and appeared on The Next Step and The Enemies of Energy.

== Track listing ==
1. "The Cloister" (Kurt Rosenwinkel) – 8:30
2. "Brooklyn Sometimes"(Rosenwinkel) – 8:22
3. "The Cross" (Rosenwinkel) – 7:35
4. "If I Should Lose You" (Ralph Rainger, Leo Robin) – 4:51
5. "Synthetics" (Rosenwinkel) – 6:16
6. "Use of Light" (Rosenwinkel) – 8:26
7. "Cake" (Rosenwinkel) – 9:17
8. "Deep Song" (George Cory, Douglass Cross) – 3:54
9. "Gesture (Lester)" (Rosenwinkel) – 7:29
10. "The Next Step" (Rosenwinkel) – 9:30

== Personnel ==
- Kurt Rosenwinkel – Guitar
- Joshua Redman – Tenor Saxophone
- Brad Mehldau – Piano
- Larry Grenadier – Bass
- Jeff Ballard – Drums (tracks 3, 4, 5, 8)
- Ali Jackson – Drums (tracks 1, 2, 6, 7, 9, 10)
