= Omer Avital =

Israeli-American jazz bassist, composer and bandleader

Omer Avital עומר אביטל
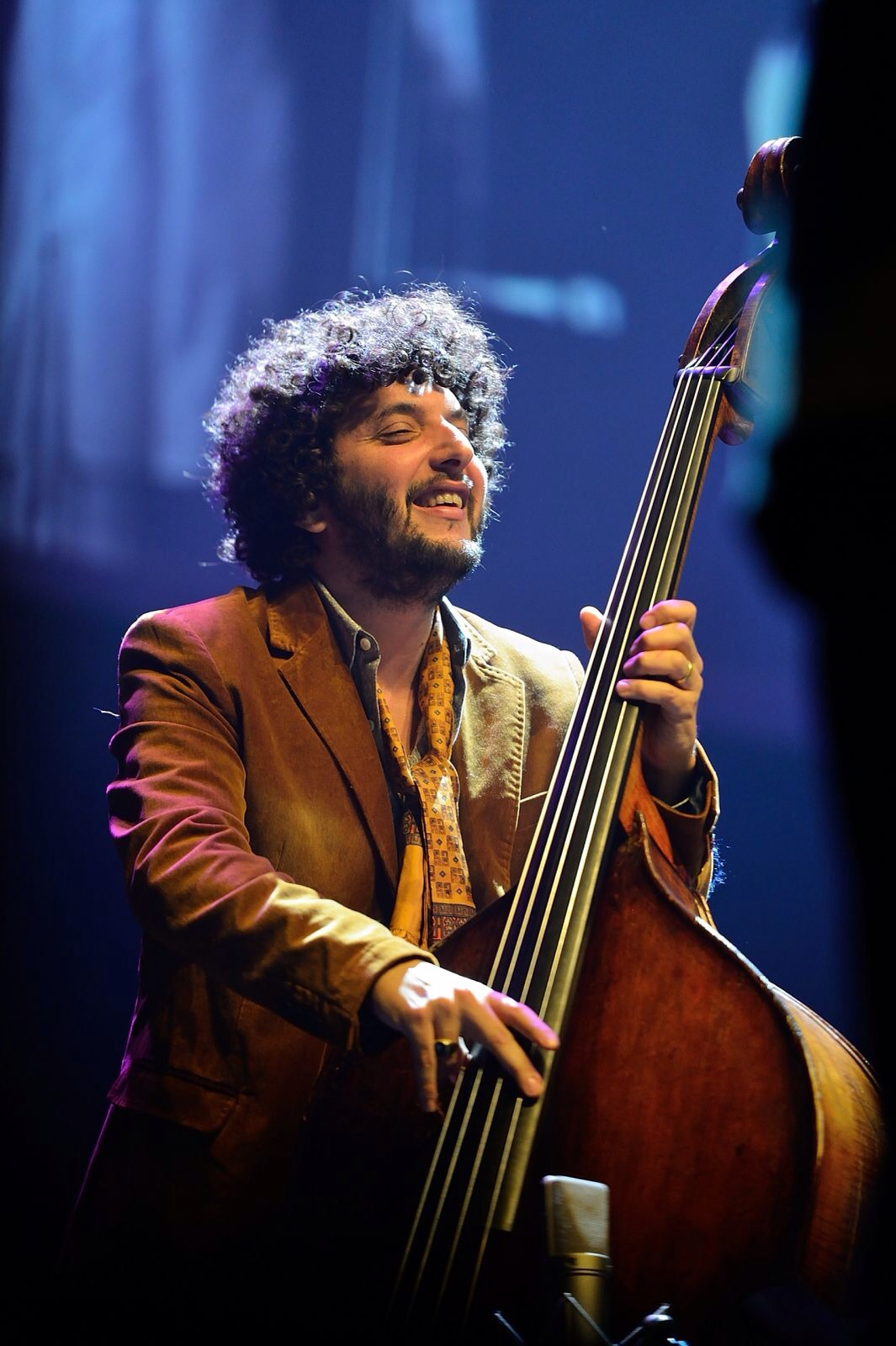
- Omer Avital at Olympia, Paris

Background information
- Born: May 13, 1971 (age 55); Givatayim, Israel
- Genres: Jazz, world music
- Occupation: Musician
- Instruments: Double bass, oud
- Years active: 1992–present
- Labels: Fresh Sound, Smalls, Motéma
- Website: www.omeravital.com

Omer Avital (Hebrew: עומר אביטל; born May 13, 1971, Givatayim, Israel) is an Israeli-American jazz bassist, composer and bandleader.

== Early life ==
Avital was born in the town of Givatayim to Moroccan and Yemeni parents. At age 11, he began his formal training, studying classical guitar at the Givatayim Conservatory. Upon entering Thelma Yellin, Israel's leading high school for the arts, Avital switched to acoustic bass and began studying and arranging jazz.

When he was 17, Avital began playing professionally in jazz, pop, and folk music bands, as well as performing regularly on national television, radio, and in jazz festivals. He spent a year in the Israeli Army Orchestra and then moved to New York in 1992 where he began playing, recording, and touring professionally.

== Career ==
After arriving in New York in 1992, Avital began playing in groups with Roy Haynes, Jimmy Cobb, Nat Adderley, Walter Bishop, Jr., Al Foster, Kenny Garrett, Steve Grossman, Jimmy Lovelace, and Rashied Ali. In 1994, he began collaborating with pianist Jason Lindner, with whom Avital began leading his own groups and big band during the after-hours sessions at Smalls Jazz Club in Greenwich Village.

In 1995 and 1996, Avital made an impact on the New York jazz scene with a series of breakout piano-less groups at the original Smalls Jazz Club, including a classic sextet with four saxophones, bass and drums, alternately included saxophonists Myron Walden, Mark Turner, Gregory Tardy, Joel Frahm, Charles Owens, Grant Stewart, Jay Collins and Jimmy Greene, and drummers Ali Jackson, Joe Strasser and Daniel Freedman. He was the subject of frequent features in The New York Times.

A number of these sessions were recorded and released under the Smalls record label. In 1997, Impulse! Records produced the compilation Jazz Underground: Live at Smalls, which featured several recordings of Avital's quartet. He signed to record his debut album, Devil Head, the following year, but it was never issued.

In 2001, Avital released his debut album, Think With Your Heart, featuring Gregory Tardy, Jay Collins, Myron Walden, Joel Frahm, Jimmy Greene, Joshua Levitt, Daniel Freedman and Marlon Browden.

In 2003, Avital returned to Israel, where for three years he studied classical composition, Arabic music theory, oud, and traditional Israeli music.

In 2005, Avital returned to New York and released three albums, including two from the Smalls recording archives and a fourth with the group Third World Love.

In 2006, Avital's album Asking No Permission was named to many best ten lists. "So we weren't crazy," wrote Ben Ratliff in the New York Times, "finally, here's proof that Omer Avital's sextet, which played at Smalls to a small but deep following in the late 90s, really was good.".

Ben Ratliff, covering a 2007 performance of Anat Cohen's quartet for The New York Times, wrote, "Between Jason Lindner’s steady vamps and inside-the-piano thumping, Omer Avital’s big, woody bass notes and Daniel Freedman’s drum grooves, the rhythm section felt heavy, almost battering. This was offset by the appearance of a string quartet, playing arrangements written by Mr. Avital, and in the presence of the strings the jazz quartet reduced itself."

In 2009, Avital and Ravid Kahalani formed Yemen Blues, a world music ensemble that combines Yemenite music with funk, blues and jazz. In 2011, Yemen Blues released their debut album, Yemen Blues. Avital served as the producer and arranger in addition to playing the bass and oud. He remained with Yemen Blues until 2012.

Avital released two albums in 2012, one with Aaron Goldberg and Ali Jackson, Jr. as Yes! Trio and another, Suite of the East, which was met with critical acclaim and was named Best Album of 2012 by the radio station TSF Jazz.

In 2013, he released his album New Song on the French label, Plus Loin Music. New Song was released in the U.S. on November 4, 2014 on Motéma Music. Avital's album Abutbul Music was released worldwide in March 2016 on the Paris-based Jazz Village label by Harmonia Mundi.

In 2025, he announced a series of performances in Israel of "North African Dream," a suite he composed collaboration with Andalusian orchestra artistic director Elad Levi for the 2024 Ashdod jazz festival.

== Awards and honors ==
- Prime Minister's Award, Israel, 2008
- ASCAP Foundation Vanguard Award, 2011

== Discography ==
As leader

- Think With Your Heart (2001)
- Arrival (2006)
- Asking No Permission (2006)
- The Ancient Art of Giving (2006)
- Room to Grow (2007)
- Free Forever (2011)
- Live at Smalls (2011)
- Suite of the East (2012)
- New Song (Motéma Music, 2014)
- Abutbul Music (Harmonia Mundi, 2016)
- Qantar (Zamzama Records, 2018)
- Qantar: New York Paradox (Zamzama Records, 2020)

As co-leader/sideman

With Third World Love

- Songs and Portraits (2012)
- New Blues (2008)
- Sketch of Tel Aviv (2006)
- Avanim (2004)
- Third World Love Songs (2002)

With Yes! Trio (Aaron Goldberg and Ali Jackson, Jr.)

- Yes! (2012)
- Groove du jour (2019)

With New Jerusalem Orchestra

- Ahavat Olamim (2011)

With Yemen Blues

- Yemen Blues (2011)
- Only Love Remains (2024)

With Debka Fantasia

- Debka Fantasia (2009)

With Anat Cohen

- Notes from the Village (2008)
- Poetica (2007)

With Marlon Browden

- The Omer Avital Marlon Browden Project (2005)

With OAM Trio (Aaron Goldberg and Marc Miralta)

- Now & Here (2005)
- Live in Sevilla (With Mark Turner) (2003)
- Flow (2002)
- Trilingual (1999)

With Avishai Cohen

- Dark Nights (2014)
- Triveni II (2012)
- Introducing Triveni (2010)
- After The Big Rain (2007)

With Claudia Acuña

- En Este Momento (2009)

With Omer Klein

- Introducing Omer Klein (2008)

With 3 Cohens (Anat, Avishai and Yuval Cohen)

- Braid (2007)

With Jason Lindner

- Live at the Jazz Gallery (2007)
- Ab Aeterno (2006)
- Live/UK (2004)
- Premonition (2000)

With Daniel Freedman

- Daniel Freedman Trio (2002)
- Bamako by Bus (2012)
- Imagine That (2016)

With Rashied Ali

- At the Vision Festival (1999)

With Antonio Hart

- For Cannonball & Woody (1993)
