= The Declaration of Musical Independence =

Studio album by Andrew Cyrille
- Released: September 23, 2016
- Recorded: July 2014
- Venue: Brooklyn Recording, Brooklyn, New York
- Genre: Jazz
- Label: ECM Records; ECM 2430
- Producer: Sun Chung

Andrew Cyrille chronology
Route de Frères (2011)	The Declaration of Musical Independence (2016)	Proximity (2016)

The Declaration of Musical Independence is an album by drummer Andrew Cyrille. It was recorded in July 2014 at Brooklyn Recording in Brooklyn, New York, and was released by ECM Records on September 23, 2016. On the album, Cyrille is joined by guitarist Bill Frisell, Richard Teitelbaum on synthesizer and piano, and Ben Street on bass.

Cyrille recalled that the recording sessions, which took place near where he was born in 1939, "were a whole lot of fun." He elaborated: "I wanted this album to be a true quartet project, where each of us had a piece of the record, in every sense. I wanted everyone to contribute music, everyone to give of themselves." In his liner notes, Ben Young suggested that "it might well be the farthest we've seen Andrew come from that warm centricity of pulsed music toward a polar outpost where it's as though atmospheric factors are models, rather than the pulsing spirit of humankind. The rate of motion recalls that of air and sea, very little about the crackling fire or the pace of moving on land. Cycles of gesture on the record are all elongated beyond heart rate, slower than breathing."

== Reception ==
Professional ratings
Review scores
Source	Rating
DownBeat	4/5 stars
The Guardian	3/5 stars
All About Jazz	4/5 stars
The Irish Times	5/5 stars
Tom Hull – on the Web	B+

In a review for DownBeat, Frank Alkyer called the album "an unabashed exploration into time, pulse, space and atmosphere," and commented: "the... music is ambitious yet simple, rich yet stripped–down, challenging yet infinitely satisfying." Mark Sullivan, writing for All About Jazz, awarded the album 4 stars, and noted that, regarding "Coltrane Time," "The solo drum introduction uses a rhythm [Cyrille] learned from drummer Rashied Ali, who learned it from Coltrane himself."

John Fordham of The Guardian called the group "an unself-consciously inquisitive, selflessly collective quartet," and remarked: "It all swings without regular swing, sounding fluently melodic, though much of it is cell-like and episodic. It might be too wrapped up in itself for some, but its close-listening musicality grows on you." Writing for The Wall Street Journal, Larry Blumenfeld praised the group, stating: "There's no ready template for this quartet, although perhaps a certain logic: Messrs. Frisell and Teitelbaum are among the most distinctive and musical players working with plugged-in instruments and processed sounds, each crafting a signature that seems at once otherworldly and personal. Mr. Street is among jazz's most versatile bassists, exuding rare empathy in every context. Such a band setup might end up messy or disjointed, however, were it not for Mr. Cyrille, whose unrestrained rhythmic flow is always direct, precise and economical."

In an article for The New York Times, Nate Chinen suggested that the album was one of several that made the case for Cyrille's late-career renaissance, and commented stated that it "highlight[s] Mr. Cyrille's insight, ingenuity and subtle mastery of touch." Cormac Larkin, writing for The Irish Times, awarded the album 5 stars, stated: "there is purpose and intent in the group's floaty, attenuated improvisations, but the loose, irregular rhythms are buoyed along and buffeted by deeper, less discernible currents, carried up from the music's ocean depths."

In a review at Sound of Surprise, Matt Phillips wrote: "Sometimes gentle but never cloying or sentimental, this is rich, ego-less music, a much-needed antidote to the desperate 'listen to me, listen to me!' nature of modern pop. Each track creates its own little world. Putting the album on for the first time, you're instantly in a warm, spacious environment, but, like a good Kubrick movie, its secrets don't give themselves up easily." Nick Lea, writing for Jazz Views, remarked: "The playing from Andrew Cyrille is a delight throughout, and is often the most straight talking whether providing a steady rhythmic support for the formal compositions or guiding the quartet through the electronic jungle of the free improvisations, with both age and experience shining through. At times not the easiest of listens, but with patience the logic of the paths taken by the quartet become appealingly apparent."

== Track listing ==
1. "Coltrane Time" (John Coltrane) - 4:58
2. "Kaddish" (Frisell) - 5:10
3. "Sanctuary" (Cyrille, Street, Frisell, Teitelbaum) - 4:16
4. "Say" (Street) - 5:00
5. "Dazzling (Perchordially Yours)" (Cyrille, Street, Frisell, Teitelbaum) - 9:52
6. "Herky Jerky" (Teitelbaum) - 3:25
7. "Begin" (Frisell) - 3:10
8. "Manfred" (Cyrille, Street, Frisell, Teitelbaum) - 4:03
9. "Song For Andrew No. 1" (Frisell) - 5:38

== Personnel ==
- Andrew Cyrille – drums, percussion
- Bill Frisell – guitar
- Richard Teitelbaum - synthesizer, piano
- Ben Street - bass

== Production ==
- Sun Chung – producer
- Rick Kwan – recording engineer
