= The Enemies of Energy =

Studio album by Kurt Rosenwinkel
- Released: 2000
- Recorded: November 18–20, 1996
- Studio: Systems Two Studios, Brooklyn, New York
- Genre: Jazz
- Length: 60:30
- Label: Verve
- Producer: Kurt Rosenwinkel

Kurt Rosenwinkel chronology
Intuit (1999)	The Enemies of Energy (2000)	The Next Step (2001)

Professional ratings
Review scores
Source	Rating
Allmusic	3/5 stars
The Penguin Guide to Jazz Recordings	3/4 stars

The Enemies of Energy a 2000 jazz album release by Kurt Rosenwinkel. Its release marked Rosenwinkel's third album as a band leader.

== Track listing ==
All tracks are written by Kurt Rosenwinkel except where noted.

No.	Title	Length
1.	"The Enemies of Energy"	7:54
2.	"Grant"	6:21
3.	"Cubism"	5:47
4.	"Number Ten"	7:28
5.	"The Polish Song"	3:21
6.	"Point of View" (Scott Kinsey)	2:24
7.	"Christmas Song"	4:47
8.	"Dream of the Old"	10:22
9.	"Synthetics"	5:14
10.	"Hope and Fear"	6:52

== Personnel ==
- Kurt Rosenwinkel – guitar
- Mark Turner – tenor saxophone
- Scott Kinsey – piano, keyboards
- Ben Street – double bass
- Jeff Ballard – drums
