= Jochen Rueckert =

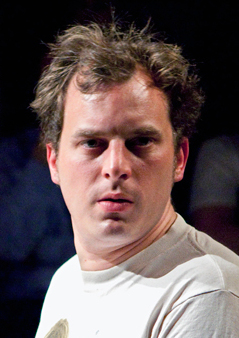
Jochen Rueckert (2009)

Jochen Rückert, spelled on most releases as Jochen Rueckert (born 13 May 1975 in Cologne, Germany) is a German jazz drummer. He is a naturalized American citizen and has resided in New York City since 1997. The brother of pianist Thomas Rückert, he began to practice drums at the age of six. He can be heard on over 120 albums and worked or recorded with musicians and bands such as the Marc Copland Trio, Nils Wogram & Root 70, the Kurt Rosenwinkel new quartet, the Mark Turner Band, the Melissa Aldana trio, the Sam Yahel trio, John Abercrombie, Ignaz Dinné, Pat Metheny, Matt Penman, Kenny Werner, Till Brönner, Joachim Kühn, Bill McHenry, John McNeil, Anke Helfrich, Ron Carter, the NDR, WDR and Orquestra Jazz de Matosinhos Big Bands, Seamus Blake, Guillermo Klein and Los Guachos as well as Madeleine Peyroux.

Rueckert started leading his own Quartet, playing his original music, with Mark Turner, Lage Lund and Matt Penman in 2011. The band has been touring about twice a year since inception and sometimes includes substitutions like Mike Moreno, Orlando LeFleming and Joseph Martin.

Rueckert also programs and releases electronic music under the moniker Wolff Parkinson White.

Rueckert also started releasing a series of ebooks chronicling every hotel room he's stayed at with a self-timer photograph and short stories about some of the more annoying aspects of life as a touring musician, called Read The Rueckert.

In 1996, he won the Blue Note Jazzsearch with the co -lead trio "Dreiklang" and the European Jazz Competition in Leverkusen with the Anke Helfrich trio.

In 1998, he released his debut album Introduction (with Hayden Chisholm, Ben Monder, Kurt Rosenwinkel, Chris Potter, Matt Penman and Johannes Weidenmüller).

In 2000, he received the North Rhine-Westphalian Award for Music.

In 2011, he released his first album with original compositions, Somewhere, Meeting Nobody.

In 2014, he released We Make The Rules.

In 2016, he released Charm Offensive.

In 2026, he works as a Jochen Rueckert new Quartet
