= My Man's Gone Now =

Aria from Porgy and Bess

"My Man's Gone Now" is an aria composed by George Gershwin, with lyrics by DuBose Heyward, written for the opera Porgy and Bess (1935).

Sung in the original production by Ruby Elzy, it has been covered by many singers, notably Ella Fitzgerald (on the 1958 Porgy and Bess album), Leontyne Price, Audra McDonald (who would later sing the part of Bess), Nina Simone, Sarah Vaughan, and Shirley Horn, among others.

== In the opera ==
In the opera, the aria is sung towards the end of act 1 by Serena, the grieving widow, at her husband Robbins's wake. He has been murdered by Crown, a drunken stevedore, during a game of craps played in the courtyard of Catfish Row. She sings that she will no longer hear his footsteps coming up stairs and that "ol man sorrow" will be her companion from now on, telling her she is old. The aria's music and lyrics refer to popular African American spiritual songs and are accompanied by melodic wails which are picked up by the chorus.

== Notable recordings ==
- Leontyne Price, who regularly played Bess, once said in a master class that it was important to express the "cultural context that is captured in the music". Speaking to an aspiring singer, she said that the song's distinctive sighing refrains must be "like moaning in church".
- Nina Simone's version on Nina Simone Sings the Blues (1967) was captured when she sang it impromptu at a recording session. According to her biographer Nadine Cohodas, "Ray Hall, the engineer, had come out of the control room. But as soon as he heard Nina and then heard the bass player catch her groove, he hustled back to run a tape. 'From somewhere', [producer] Davis said of the bewitching moment, 'she called up the stamina to deliver with even more intensity and spirit a rare, perfect performance in one take, which could not possibly be improved.'"
- The song has repeatedly been adapted for jazz versions, notably by Bill Evans in 1961 on Sunday at the Village Vanguard, and by Miles Davis and Gil Evans in 1959 on their album Porgy and Bess, and then by Davis again in 1981 on the live album We Want Miles.
- The song is included in 1984 album The Las Vegas Story by The Gun Club
- The song is included in 1986 album Work! by jazz pianist Mulgrew Miller.
- The song is included in 2000 album Aria by jazz saxophonist Grover Washington Jr.
- The song is included in 2019 album The Gleaners by jazz bassist Larry Grenadier.

== Critical views ==
Stephen Sondheim has expressed his deep admiration for Dubose Heyward's lyrics, writing that, along with Summertime, it creates a distinctive "informal, uneducated diction and a stream of consciousness" that defines the verbal style of the characters.

Deryck Cooke in The Language of Music refers to the song as an example of "substituting the minor for the major third in the descending 5–3–1 progression, we have a phrase which has been much used to express an 'incoming' painful emotion, in a context of finality: acceptance of, or yielding to grief; discouragement and depression; passive suffering; and the despair connected with death." Gershwin uses it to express "the despair of Serena... as she laments that her murdered husband will never come home to her again—'My man's gone now'."
