= Diego Barber =

Spanish classical and jazz guitarist

- Born: Lanzarote, Canary Islands, Spain
- Genres: Jazz, classical
- Occupation: Musician
- Instrument: Guitar
- Labels: Sunnyside, Origin

Diego Barber is a classical and jazz guitarist. He has recorded albums for Sunnyside and Origin Records.

== Early life ==
Barber was born into a family of musicians. He studied at the Lanzarote Conservatory of Music with Miguel Ángel Calzadilla and took private lessons with Toñin Corújo. Years later, he enrolled at the Arturo Soria Conservatory in Madrid. He met José Ramón García, who taught him harmony, analysis, and composition.

He received a degree in classical guitar from the Salamanca Higher Conservatory of Music. During his time at Salamanca, he took lessons from Costas Cotsiolis for one year in Atenas and from Ricardo Gallén.

Barber attended the Mozarteum University of Salzburg where he completed his postgraduate studies with Marco Tamayo. He won first prize in the Leo Brouwer Guitar Festival and Competition in Spain in 2003, as well as the first prize in a competition organized by the Miami Classical Guitar Society.

== Personal life ==
Barber lives in New York City where he has recorded the albums Calima, The Choice, and Tales in cooperation with Mark Turner, Jeff Ballard, Larry Grenadier, Ari Hoenig, Johannes Weidenmüller, and Seamus Blake, all recordings were released on Sunnyside Records. His duo album with pianist Craig Taborn, Tales, was mentioned in several top ten charts and Best-of-2014 lists such as iTunes (awarded with 4 stars), Down Beat (4 of 5 stars), The New York City Jazz Record, Baltimore City Paper and The New York Village Voice. The album 411, a quintet recording from 2011 co-led by Hugo Ciprés was released on Origin Records in 2013.

== Discography ==
- Calima (Sunnyside, 2009)
- The Choice (Sunnyside, 2011)
- 411 (Origin, 2013)
- Tales (Sunnyside, 2014)
- One Minute Later (Sunnyside, 2017)
