= In This World (disambiguation) =

In This World is a 2002 British docudrama directed by Michael Winterbottom.

In This World may refer to:

- "In This World" (song), a 2002 song by Moby
- In This World (Cindytalk album), 1988
- In This World (Mark Turner album), 1998
