= Long Ago and Far Away =

Long Ago and Far Away may refer to:

- "Long Ago (and Far Away)", a popular song by Jerome Kern and Ira Gershwin from the 1944 film musical Cover Girl
- Long Ago and Far Away (Tony Bennett album), 1958
- "Long Ago and Far Away" (James Taylor song), 1971
- Long Ago and Far Away (TV series), a public television series for children hosted by James Earl Jones, which aired 1989-1992
- Long Ago and Far Away, a one-act play by David Ives, included in later (post-1994) editions of All in the Timing
- Long Ago and Far Away (Charlie Watts album), 1996
- Long Ago and Far Away (Charlie Haden and Brad Mehldau album), 2007
- Long Ago and Far Away: James Taylor, His Life and Music, a 2002 biography of James Taylor by Timothy White
