= Mark Turner (musician) =

American jazz saxophonist (born 1965)

- Turner at the Deutsches Jazzfestival, 2015

Background information
- Born: November 10, 1965 (age 61); Fairborn, Ohio, U.S.
- Genre: Jazz
- Occupation: Musician
- Instrument: Tenor saxophone
- Years active: 1990s–present
- Labels: Criss Cross Jazz; Warner Bros.; Fresh Sound; Naïve; ECM; Capri; Giant Step Arts; Loveland
- Formerly of: Fly; SFJAZZ Collective; MTB (Brad Mehldau & Peter Bernstein)
- Website: markturnerjazz.com

Mark Turner (born November 10, 1965) is an American jazz saxophonist.

== Biography ==
Born on November 10, 1965, in Fairborn, Ohio, and raised in Palos Verdes Estates, California, Turner originally intended to become a commercial artist. In elementary school, he played the clarinet, followed by the alto and tenor saxophones in high school. He attended California State University, Long Beach, in the 1980s (playing in the jazz ensembles) and then transferred to and graduated from Berklee College of Music in 1990 before moving to New York. Turner worked at Tower Records in New York City for an extended period before working full-time as a jazz musician.

In early November 2008, Turner injured two fingers on one of his hands with a power saw, but as of late February 2009, he was performing again with the Edward Simon Quartet at the Village Vanguard.

He is married to the psychiatrist and anthropologist Helena Hansen.

== Style and influences ==
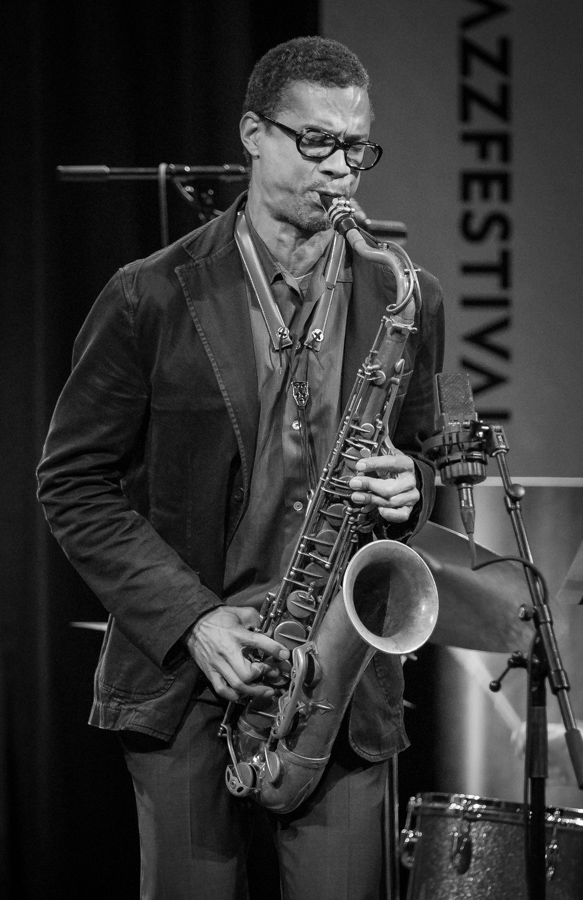
Turner at the Oslo Jazzfestival, 2017

Turner's sound is reminiscent of that of Warne Marsh, also incorporating elements of John Coltrane in his playing; Turner has mentioned both Marsh and Coltrane as influences, and has used elements of both players' styles in his music. Turner's range extends into the high altissimo register. His improvised lines tend to span several octaves and contain great harmonic and rhythmic complexity. His compositions often make use of repeated patterns, odd-metered time signatures, and intervallic leaps.

Turner states that his music is "unfolding like a narrative". Accordingly, his 2014 album Lathe of Heaven is named after Ursula K. Le Guin's novel of the same title, which is based on the idea of a world where the nature of reality keeps shifting.

== Musical associations ==
Turner with the Fly trio in 2010; from left: Turner, Larry Grenadier, and Jeff Ballard

In September 2014, Turner released his first album as a leader since 2001, on ECM Records; it features trumpeter Avishai Cohen, bassist Joe Martin, and drummer Marcus Gilmore. Turner is a member of the trio Fly, which includes himself, bassist Larry Grenadier, and drummer Jeff Ballard. He also appears in guitarist Gilad Hekselman's Quartet, and drummer Billy Hart's Quartet. Turner has recorded extensively with guitarist Kurt Rosenwinkel, saxophonist David Binney, and pianist Aaron Goldberg, among others. He has played or collaborated with over 45 jazz bands. In 2018 and 2019 alone, he played on eight different jazz albums as a sideman or collaborator.

== Discography ==
=== As leader/co-leader ===
- Yam Yam (Criss Cross, 1995)
- Warner Jams Vol. 2: The Two Tenors (Warner Bros., 1997) with James Moody
- Mark Turner (Warner Bros., 1998) – rec. 1995
- In This World (Warner Bros., 1998)
- The Music of Mercedes Rossy (Fresh Sound, 1998) – compositions by Mercedes Rossy
- Ballad Session (Warner Bros., 2000) – rec. 1999
- Two Tenor Ballads (Criss Cross, 2000)
- Dharma Days (Warner Bros., 2001)
- Dusk Is a Quiet Place (Naïve, 2013) with Baptiste Trotignon
- Lathe of Heaven (ECM, 2014) – rec. 2013
- Temporary Kings (ECM, 2018) with Ethan Iverson – rec. 2017
- Mark Turner Meets Gary Foster (Capri, 2019)[2CD] with Gary Foster – live; rec. 2003
- Where Are You? (Fresh Sound, 2019) with Kevin Hays and Marc Miralta – rec. 2018
- Return from the Stars (ECM, 2022) – rec. 2019
- Live at the Village Vanguard (Giant Step Arts, 2023) – rec. 2022
- Reflections On: The Autobiography of an Ex-Colored Man (Giant Step Arts, 2025)
- We Raise Them to Lift Their Heads (Loveland, 2025) – rec. 2019
- Patternmaster (ECM, 2026) – rec. 2024

=== As a member ===
Fly
With Larry Grenadier and Jeff Ballard

- Fly (Savoy, 2004)
- Sky & Country (ECM, 2009)
- Year of the Snake (ECM, 2012)

SFJAZZ Collective

- Wonder (SFJAZZ, 2012)

MTB
With Brad Mehldau and Peter Bernstein

- Consenting Adults (Criss Cross Jazz, 2000) – rec. 1994
- Solid Jackson (Criss Cross Jazz, 2024) – rec. 2023

=== As sideman ===
With Reid Anderson

- Dirty Show Tunes (Fresh Sound, 1997)
- Abolish Bad Architecture (Fresh Sound, 1999)

With Omer Avital

- Asking No Permission (Smalls, 2005 [1996]) – live
- The Ancient Art of Giving (Smalls, 2006)

With David Binney

- Barefooted Town (Criss Cross, 2011)
- Cities and Desire (Criss Cross, 2006)

With Jakob Bro

- Sidetracked (Loveland, 2005)
- Pearl River (Loveland, 2007)

With George Colligan

- Constant Source (SteepleChase, 2000)
- The Newcomer (SteepleChase, 1997)
- Unresolved (Fresh Sound, 1999)

With Benoît Delbecq

- Phonetics (Songlines, 2005)
- Spots on Stripes (Clean Feed, 2018)

With Aaron Goldberg

- Turning Point (J-Curve, 1999)
- Home (Sunnyside, 2010)

With Jon Gordon

- Witness (Criss Cross, 1996)
- Along the Way (Criss Cross, 1997)

With Tom Harrell

- Trip (HighNote, 2014)
- Infinity (HighNote, 2019)

With Billy Hart

- Billy Hart Quartet (HighNote, 2005)
- All Our Reasons (ECM, 2011)
- One Is the Other (ECM, 2013)
- Multidirectional (Smoke Sessions, 2023)

With Gilad Hekselman

- Hearts Wide Open (Le Chant du Monde, 2011)
- This Just In (Jazz Village, 2013)

With Matthias Lupri

- Same Time Twice (Summit, 2002)
- Transition Sonic (Summit, 2004)

With Ibrahim Maalouf

- Wind (Mi'ster, 2012)
- Kalthoum (Mi'ster, 2015)

With Joe Martin

- Passage (Fresh Sound, 2002 [2001])
- Etoilee (Sunnyside, 2019 [2018])

With Kurt Rosenwinkel

- The Enemies of Energy (Verve, 2000 [1996])
- The Next Step (Verve, 2000 [2000])
- Heartcore (Verve, 2003 [2001–03])
- The Remedy (ArtistShare, 2008 [2006])[2-CD] – live
- Caipi (Razdaz, 2017 [2007–17])

With Jochen Rueckert

- Somewhere Meeting Nobody (Pirouet, 2011)
- We Make the Rules (Whirlwind, 2014)
- Charm Offensive (Pirouet, 2016)

With Edward Simon

- Edward Simon (Kokopelli, 1995)
- La Bikina (Red, 2011)
- Venezuelan Suite (Sunnyside, 2013)

With Baptiste Trotignon

- Share (Naïve, 2008)
- Suite (Naïve, 2009)

With David Virelles

- Motion (Justin Time, 2007)
- Continuum (Pi, 2012)

With Miki Yamanaka

- Stairway to the Stars (Outside In Music, 2021)
- Shades of Rainbow (Cellar Music Group, 2023)

With others

- Carl Allen, Echoes of Our Heroes (Evidence, 1996)
- Jeff Ballard, Fairgrounds (Edition, 2019 [2015]) – live
- Diego Barber, Calima (Sunnyside, 2009)
- Joao Barradas, Portrait (Nischo, 2020)
- Seamus Blake, Four Track Mind (Criss Cross, 1997 [1994])
- Stefano Bollani, Joy in Spite of Everything (ECM, 2014)
- Chris Cheek, A Girl Named Joe (Fresh Sound, 1998)
- Yelena Eckemoff, A Touch of Radiance (L&H, 2014)
- Robert Glasper, Canvas (Blue Note, 2005)
- Russell Gunn, Love Requiem (HighNote, 1999)
- Anke Helfrich, You'll See (Double Moon, 2002)
- Jonny King, In from the Cold (Criss Cross, 1994)
- Ryan Kisor, On the One (Columbia, 1993)
- Lee Konitz, Parallels (Chesky, 2001)
- Delfeayo Marsalis, Pontius Pilate's Decision (Novus, 1992)
- Francisco Mela, Cirio (Half Note, 2008)
- Ferenc Nemeth, Night Songs (Dreamers, 2007)
- Josh Ottum, Like the Season (Tapete, 2006)
- Leon Parker, Above & Below (Epicure, 1994)
- John Patitucci, Imprint (Concord Jazz, 2000 [1999])
- Enrico Rava, New York Days (ECM, 2009)
- Joshua Redman, Beyond (Warner Bros., 2000 [1999])
- Aldo Romano, The Jazzpar Prize (Enja, 2004)
- Jorge Rossy, Stay There (Pirouet, 2016)
- Samo Šalamon, Mamasaal feat. Mark Turner (Dometra, 2008)
- Perico Sambeat, Ademuz (Fresh Sound, 1998)
- Jaleel Shaw, Perspective (Fresh Sound, 2005)
- Yeahwon Shin, Yeahwon (ArtistShare, 2010)
- Jimmy Smith, Damn! (Verve, 1995)
- Chris Wiesendanger, Urban Village (Fresh Sound, 2002)
- Mark Zubek, Twentytwodollarfishlunch (Fresh Sound, 2009)
