= The Gleaners (album) =

Studio album by Larry Grenadier
- Released: February 22, 2019
- Recorded: December 2016
- Studio: Avatar, New York City
- Genre: Jazz
- Length: 42:02
- Label: ECM 6757841
- Producer: Manfred Eicher

Larry Grenadier chronology
Where the River Goes (2018)	The Gleaners (2019)

Professional ratings
Review scores
Source	Rating
All About Jazz	4/5 stars
AllMusic	4.5/5 stars
Blurt	4/5 stars
DownBeat	4/5 stars
Jazz Journal	4/5 stars
Jazz Forum	5/5 stars
Jazzwise	3/5 stars
Le Devoir	4/5 stars
PopMatters	7/10
Tom Hull	B+

The Gleaners is the debut studio album by jazz bassist Larry Grenadier. The record was released by ECM on February 22, 2019, on CD, vinyl, and as a digital download.

== Background ==
This is a rare bass-only record. Grenadier, in fact, uses the double bass as two instruments, playing both pizzicato and arco. The album title was inspired by Agnès Varda’s documentary film The Gleaners and I, itself inspired by an oil painting by Jean-François Millet completed in 1857. The album contains 12 solo tracks that include Grenadier's originals as well as compositions written by George Gershwin, John Coltrane, Paul Motian, Rebecca Martin, and Wolfgang Muthspiel. Grenadier wrote in the liner notes, "The process for making this record began with a look inward... an excavation into the core elements of who I am as a bass player. It was a search for a center of sound and timbre, for the threads of harmony and rhythm that formulate the crux of a musical identity." The album was recorded in the Avatar Studios in December 2016 in New York and produced by Manfred Eicher. Grenadier and Eicher mixed the album at Studios La Buissonne in France. Grenadier also explained, "I experimented with various tunings and scordatura, like the 17th- and 18th-century violinists used, to get a full range of sounds – and that ended up giving the instrument a whole new vibration for me, a feeling of real sonic potential." The album release was celebrated by a party at the Zürcher Gallery in New York City on 15 March 2019.

== Reception ==
Jim Macnie of JazzTimes commented, "The Gleaners is one of those records you'll keep returning to. Assurance, comfort, expression, vulnerability—a manifold approach to emotion makes Grenadier's recital an irresistible excursion." In his review for All About Jazz Karl Ackermann stated, "It's not surprising that Grenadier hasn't released a solo album, given the relative rarity of stand-alone bass recordings, but The Gleaners proves to be worth the wait." Alex W. Rodriguez of DownBeat wrote, "A testament to one of our generation’s true bass craftsmen, The Gleaners offers a pathway into a brilliant mind taking a rare and well-deserved turn in the spotlight." AllMusic's Thom Jurek commented, "While solo double bass records are usually meant for a very specific group of listeners, The Gleaners proves an exception. It is so sensitive, creative, and stylistically diverse that it presents perhaps the first real opportunity for such a recording to engage an audience beyond the standard confines of aficionados and other musicians. The Gleaners is an inner exploration articulated with uncommon generosity, disciplined artistry, and a poet's gift for illumination." Michael Toland of Blurt wrote that the album is, "A master class in the balance of musical mood settings and technical wizardry."

Will Layman writing for PopMatters called the album, "a worthy addition to ECM's history of music for upright bass alone." Kevin Johnson in his review for No Treble mentioned that the album, "is undoubtedly a masterpiece for solo bass that future records will be judged against." Dusty Groove's reviewer wrote, "A record that fits perfectly in the best ECM tradition, yet also provides a stunning showcase for the artist as well!... Grenadier finds so many ways to create different shades and tones with his instrument – sometimes bowing, sometimes plucking, always with a different vibe on each of the album's tracks – and occasionally hitting modes that have us running to the notes, confirming that there's no other instrument used at all on the recording." Fred Grand of Jazz Journal noted, "Brilliantly conceived and executed from start to finish, The Gleaners offers an exploded view an artist at the peak of his powers and makes a worthy edition to ECM’s prestigious library of music for solo bass."

== Track listing ==
No.	Title	Writer(s)	Length
1.	"Oceanic"	Grenadier	2:26
2.	"Pettiford"	Grenadier	3:41
3.	"The Gleaner"	Grenadier	2:10
4.	"Woebegone"	Grenadier	3:23
5.	"Gone Like the Season Does"	Rebecca Martin	4:29
6.	"Compassion / The Owl of Cranston"	John Coltrane, Paul Motian	9:08
7.	"Vineland"	Grenadier	3:06
8.	"Lovelair"	Grenadier	3:39
9.	"Bagatelle 1"	Wolfgang Muthspiel	1:49
10.	"Bagatelle 2"	Wolfgang Muthspiel	1:48
11.	"My Man's Gone Now"	George Gershwin	5:35
12.	"A Novel in a Sigh"	Grenadier	0:48
Total length:			42:02

== Personnel ==
- Larry Grenadier – bass

== Chart performance ==
Chart (2019)	Peak position
US Jazz Albums (Billboard)	15
