= Brad Mehldau Trio Live =

Live album by Brad Mehldau Trio
- Released: March 25, 2008
- Recorded: October 11–15, 2006
- Venue: Village Vanguard (New York City)
- Genre: Jazz
- Length: 155:59
- Label: Nonesuch; 7559-79956-5
- Producer: Brad Mehldau

Brad Mehldau chronology
| Metheny/Mehldau Quartet (2005) | Brad Mehldau Trio Live (2006) | Love Sublime (2006) |

Brad Mehldau Trio Live is a live album by American pianist and composer Brad Mehldau's Trio released on the Nonesuch label in 2008.

== Reception ==
Professional ratings
Review scores
| Source | Rating |
|---|---|
| AllMusic | 4/5 stars |
| The Guardian | 4/5 stars |
| PopMatters | 8/10 |

The album received universally favourable reviews. AllMusic awarded the album 4 stars and in its review by Thom Jurek, states "Those new or curious about the trio will be astonished by what's here, pure and simple. For seasoned jazz fans and those of the pianist in particular, this is nothing short of total delight". The Guardian's John Fordham observed "Since the mid-1990s, the prodigiously gifted pianist Brad Mehldau has been turning out one disc a year. Yet every Mehldau venture offers a new mix of standard songs and deconstructed pop themes; a new level of understanding within his group; a new twist on old piano-trio rules; and a startling new freedom in the way the pianist's left hand cajoles, threatens and encourages his right". On All About Jazz, John Kelman noted "Ballard has lit an unmistakable fire under this group, but it's the trio's increasing open-mindedness that distinguishes Live from its previous live outings. Refined simplicity contrasts with sophisticated complexity while spare economy coexists alongside busier dynamics, making Live another exceptional milestone in a career defined by gradual but unrelenting growth and exploration". PopMatters reviewer Ron Hart said "On Brad Mehldau Trio Live, he provides yet another impressive showcase from his favorite NYC stage across a massive two-disc set that features his latest trio, which includes longtime bassist Larry Grenadier and daring new drummer Jeff Ballard." JazzTimes reviewer, Thomas Conrad commented "Mehldau plays here with a daring abandon that sweeps all of the 12 performances far from where they began. Yet he is not reckless; every piece sustains one large idea. Grenadier and Ballard never crowd the musical space, yet their indispensable, defining roles occur in the foreground".

== Track listing ==
All compositions by Brad Mehldau except as indicated

Disc One:

1. Introduction – 0:15
2. "Wonderwall" (Noel Gallagher) – 8:45
3. "Ruby's Rub" – 13:07
4. "O Que Será" (Chico Buarque) – 10:38
5. "B–Flat Waltz" – 9:11
6. "Black Hole Sun" (Chris Cornell) – 23:31
7. "The Very Thought of You" (Ray Noble) – 13:03

Disc Two:

1. "Buddha Realm" – 12:00
2. "Fit Cat" – 10:41
3. "Secret Beach" – 11:35
4. "C.T.A." (Jimmy Heath) – 16:16
5. "More Than You Know" (Billy Rose, Edward Eliscu, Vincent Youmans) – 12:09
6. "Countdown" (John Coltrane) – 14:57

== Personnel ==
- Brad Mehldau – Piano
- Larry Grenadier – Bass
- Jeff Ballard – Drums

== Credits ==
- Produced by Brad Mehldau
- Executive Producer – Robert Hurwitz
- Engineered by Rick Jacobsohn and Tim Martyn
- Mixing by James Farber
- Mastering by Greg Calbi
- Artwork by John Gall
- Photography by Michael Wilson
