= Two Tenor Ballads =

Studio album by Mark Turner and Tad Shull
- Released: 2000
- Recorded: December 30, 1994
- Studio: RPM Studio, Englewood, NJ
- Genre: Jazz
- Length: 67:42
- Label: Criss Cross Jazz; Criss 1182 CD
- Producer: Gerry Teekens

Mark Turner chronology
| In This World (1998) | Two Tenor Ballads (2000) | Ballad Session (2000) |

Two Tenor Ballads is an album by saxophonists Mark Turner and Tad Shull which was recorded in 1994 but not released until 2000 by the Criss Cross Jazz label.

== Reception ==
Professional ratings
Review scores
| Source | Rating |
|---|---|
| AllMusic | 3.5/5 stars |
| The Penguin Guide to Jazz Recordings | 3.5/4 stars |

The AllMusic review by Al Campbell states "Tenor saxophonists Tad Shull and Mark Turner had only met the day before Two Tenor Ballads was recorded but immediately found a mutual love of these classic melodies. Like Ben Webster or Coleman Hawkins, Tad Shull's tone is harder while Turner's is light and reminiscent of Warne Marsh".

All About Jazz reviewer C. Andrew Hovan said, "Two Tenor Ballads gives us a sumptuous early look at Turner, who has since become a leading man of great promise. Unfortunately, this “lost session” is the most recent work to feature Shull, a neglected maverick who is rarely heard from these days".

In JazzTimes, Peter Margasak observing that "Pairing Mark Turner with swing specialist Tad Shull was an inspired idea, but on Two Tenor Ballads their interaction level is virtually nil ... it’s little more than a blowing session, and on half the tracks the saxophonists play alone with the rhythm section. Turner’s recent Ballad Session (Warner Bros.) is more satisfying and his playing is much better, but this Criss Cross album offers a nice glimpse at his beginnings".

== Track listing ==
1. "A Flower Is a Lovesome Thing" (Billy Strayhorn) – 9:58
2. "Autumn in New York" (Vernon Duke) – 6:26
3. "Blue in Green" (Miles Davis) – 6:33
4. "What's My Name" (David Saxon, Robert Wells) – 7:15
5. "I Forgot to Remember" (Lucky Thompson) – 7:32
6. "Alone Together" (Arthur Schwartz, Howard Dietz) – 6:49
7. "Very Early" (Bill Evans) – 6:23
8. "Turn Out the Stars" (Evans) – 10:23
9. "You've Changed" (Carl Fischer, Bill Carey) – 6:23

== Personnel ==
- Mark Turner, Tad Shull — tenor saxophone
- Kevin Hays — piano
- Larry Grenadier — bass
- Billy Drummond — drums
