= Rebecca Martin =

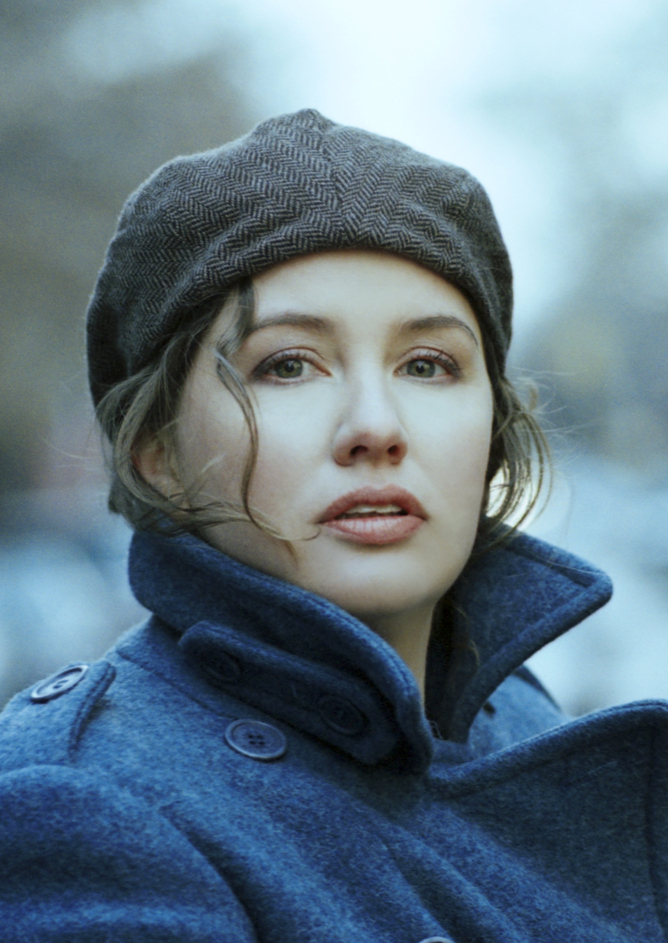
- Rebecca Martin, in 2004.

Background information
- Born: 24 April 1969 (age 57); Rumford, Maine, U.S.
- Genres: Jazz, vocal jazz, pop
- Occupations: Musician, singer, songwriter
- Instruments: Vocals, guitar
- Years active: 1990–present
- Labels: MAXJAZZ, Sunnyside
- Website: www.rebeccamartin.com

Rebecca Martin (born April 24, 1969) is an American singer and songwriter from Rumford, Maine.

== Discography ==
=== As leader/co-leader ===
- Thoroughfare (self-released, 1998)
- Middlehope (Fresh Sound New Talent, 2001)
- People Behave Like Ballads (Maxjazz, 2004)
- The Growing Season (Sunnyside, 2008)
- When I Was Long Ago (Sunnyside, 2010)
- Twain (Sunnyside, 2013)

Collaborations

- The Upstate Project with Guillermo Klein (Sunnyside, 2017) – feat. Larry Grenadier & Jeff Ballard
- After Midnight with Larry Grenadier, Orquestra Jazz de Matosinhos (Cara · Core Port, 2022)

=== As a member ===
Once Blue
With Jesse Harris

- Once Blue (EMI, 1995) – reissued with bonus tracks (EMI/Toshiba, 1997)
- Once Blue Live at the Handlebar (Core Port, 2018) – live recorded in 1996

Tillery
With Gretchen Parlato and Becca Stevens

- Tillery (Core Port, 2016)

=== As sidewoman ===
- Paul Motian, On Broadway Vol. 4 or The Paradox of Continuity (Winter & Winter, 2006)

=== As producer ===
- Dorothy Scott, Restless Machinery (Pumpkin, 1999)
- Rebecca Martin/Frank Tedesso/Timothy Hill, The Independence Project / Live at The Outlook (2001)
