= Miki (album) =

Studio album by Miki Yamanaka
- Released: August 24, 2018
- Recorded: August 8–9, 2017
- Studio: Acoustic Recording, Brooklyn, New York
- Genre: Jazz
- Length: 57:49
- Label: Cellar Live
- Producer: Miki Yamanaka

Miki Yamanaka chronology
Miki (2018)	Human Dust Suite (2020)

Miki is the debut album from Japanese jazz pianist Miki Yamanaka, released in 2018. Many of the tracks on the album have food-related names.

== Critical reception ==
Professional ratings
Review scores
Source	Rating
DownBeat	3.5/5 stars

DownBeat Magazine published two reviews for the album. The first of these, by Dave Cantor, states that "Even if the song titles weren’t playful, pianist Miki Yamanaka’s writing would radiate a unique buoyancy across her jubilant debut." The second, by Fred Bouchard, gave the album 3.5 stars, stating "Miki Yamanaka runs free and easy with a fresh spin on mainstream bop. Her light touch tickles airy tunes with will-o’-the-wisp turns and oddly formal grace notes... the democratic pianist gives plenty of solo space from the git-go to her top-notch bandmates." Collin Story, writing in the WholeNote, declares that "Overall, Miki is a success, both on the merits of Yamanaka’s playing and on the compelling group dynamic that she has cultivated."

== Track listing ==
All tracks written by Miki Yamanaka unless otherwise indicated

1. Mr. Pancake – 05:34
2. eYes – 05:37
3. Monk's Dream (Thelonious Monk) – 06:42
4. Sea Salt – 03:54
5. Stuffed Cabbage – 06:15
6. Book – 05:29
7. A Fake Hero – 06:12
8. For All We Know (Fred Coots, Sam M. Lewis) – 04:55
9. Wonder – 06:23
10. What About Food – 06:49

== Personnel ==
- Miki Yamanaka – piano
- Steve Nelson – vibraphone
- Orlando le Fleming – bass
- Bill Stewart – drums
