= Joe Martin (bassist) =

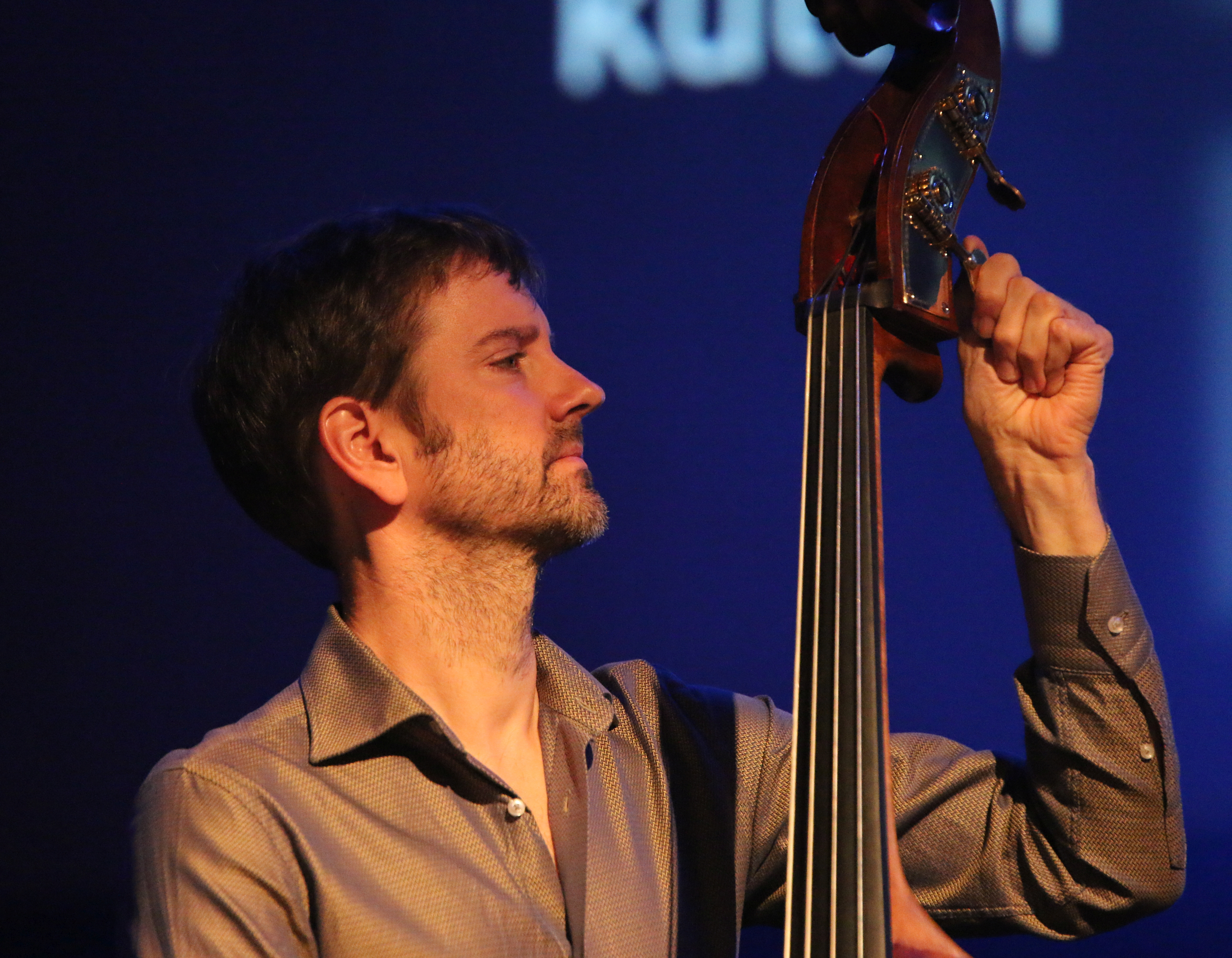
- Martin in 2015

Background information
- Born: Iowa, U.S.
- Genres: Jazz
- Occupation: Musician
- Instrument: Bass
- Years active: 1990s–present
- Labels: Fresh Sound, Anzic

Joe Martin is an American jazz bassist and composer.

== Biography ==
Martin moved to New York City in 1994. His recording debut as a leader was Passage, a quartet album with tenor saxophonist Mark Turner, pianist Kevin Hays and drummer Jorge Rossy, recorded in 2001. Seven of the eight tracks were Martin compositions. His second album as leader was Not by Chance, in 2009, with Chris Potter (tenor sax, soprano sax, bass clarinet), Brad Mehldau (piano), and Marcus Gilmore (drums). Martin has often worked in Turner's quartet, and in guitarist Gilad Hekselman's group.

== Discography ==
An asterisk (*) indicated that the year is that of release.

=== As leader ===
Year recorded	Title	Label	Notes
2001	Passage	Fresh Sound New Talent	Quartet, with Mark Turner (tenor sax), Kevin Hays (piano), Jorge Rossy (drums)
2009	Not by Chance	Anzic	Quartet, with Chris Potter (tenor sax, soprano sax, bass clarinet), Brad Mehldau (piano), Marcus Gilmore (drums)
2019?	Étoilée	Sunnyside	Quartet, with Mark Turner (tenor sax, soprano sax), Kevin Hays (piano), Nasheet Waits (drums)

=== As sideman ===
Year recorded	Leader	Title	Label
2018	Rudy Royston	Flatbed Buggy	Greanleaf
2018	Jerome Sabbagh	No Filter	Sunnyside
2018	Michael Leonhart	The Painted Lady Suite	Sunnyside
2017	Chris Potter	The Dreamer Is the Dream	ECM
2017	David Kikoski	Kayemode	Criss Cross
2017	Simona Premazzi	Outspoken	Premazzi
2016*	Edward Simon	Latin American Songbook	Sunnyside
2015*	Gilad Hekselman	Homes	Jazz Village
2015*	Oded Lev-Ari	Threading	Anzic
2015	John Raymond	Foreign Territory	FSNT
2014	Anat Cohen	Luminosa	Anzic
2014	Jerome Sabbagh	The Turn	Sunnyside
2013	Mark Turner	Lathe of Heaven	ECM
2013	Gilad Hekselman	This Just In	Jazz Village
2012*	Anat Cohen	Claroscuro	Anzic
2012	Donald Fagen	Sunken Condos-'Slinky Thing"	Reprise
2012	Nadje Noordhuis	Nadje Noordhuis	Little Mystery
2011	Gilad Hekselman	Hearts Wide Open	Chant du Monde
2011	John Stetch	Fabled States	Addo
2010	Jacam Manricks	Trigonometry	Posi-Tone
2010	John McNeil and Bill McHenry	Chill Morn He Climb Jenny	Sunnyside
2010	Scott Feiner	Accents	Zoho
2009	Raphael Imbert	NY Project	Harmonia Mundi
2008	Kurt Rosenwinkel	The Remedy	Artist Share
2008	John McNeil and Bill McHenry	Rediscovery	Sunnyside
2008	Jaleel Shaw	Optimism	Changu
2008	Gilad Hekselman	Words Unspoken	Late Set
2007	Jerome Sabbagh	Pogo	Bee Jazz
2006	Gilad Hekselman	Split Life	Smalls Records
2005	Jon Gordon	The Things You Are	Artist Share
2004	Jerome Sabbagh	North	FSNT
2003	Ari Ambrose	Jazmin	Steeplechase
2002	Jane Monheit	In the Sun	N-Coded
1998	Kurt Rosenwinkel	Intuit	Criss Cross
1998	Nat Su	The J Way	FSNT
1997	Jon Gordon	Along the Way	Criss Cross
1996	Perico Sambeat	Ademuz	FSNT
1996	Dan Faulk	Spirits in the Night	Fresh Sound
1996	International Hashva Orchestra		TCB
1995	Michael Leonhart	Aardvark Poses	Sunnyside
