= Live in Marciac =

Live album by Brad Mehldau
- Released: February 22, 2011
- Recorded: August 2, 2006
- Venue: Jazz in Marciac (Marciac, France)
- Genre: Jazz
- Length: 101:47
- Label: Nonesuch; 520275-2
- Producer: Brad Mehldau

Brad Mehldau chronology
Love Sublime (2006)	Live in Marciac (2006)	Long Ago and Far Away (2007)

Live in Marciac is a live album by American pianist and composer Brad Mehldau released on the Nonesuch label in 2011. The album consists of 2 CDs and a DVD featuring Mehldau's performance at Jazz in Marciac in France in 2006.

== Reception ==
Professional ratings
Aggregate scores
Source	Rating
Metacritic	81/100
Review scores
Source	Rating
AllMusic	4/5 stars
The Guardian	3/5 stars
Jazzwise	4/5 stars
PopMatters	8/10 stars
Tom Hull	B+

The album received generally favourable reviews with Metacritic giving it a score of 81% from 8 reviews. AllMusic awarded the album 4 stars and in its review by Thom Jurek, states "For Mehldau's fans, this is another opportunity to hear just how creative and versatile he is, even with familiar material. For the uninitiated, this is a grand opportunity to acquaint yourself with one of the most gifted jazz pianists on the scene". The Guardian's John Fordham observed "The American star charges through this 100-minutes-plus gig with such an emphasis on repeat notes, brusque segues and thundering counterpoint that its feverish density gets close to overpowering at times. But Mehldau's quirky covers are as compelling as ever".

PopMatters Associate Music Editor John Garratt said "Through his choice to cover the likes of Oasis and Soundgarden, his crossover endeavors into classical and pop-jazz territory, and all of those pesky Bill Evans comparisons, it’s easy to forget that Brad Mehldau is a soulful interpreter and damn fine pianist. Top tier. If Live in Marciac doesn’t convince you, I don’t know what will" On All About Jazz, John Kelman noted "Live in Marciac stands out as a signpost on Mehldau's evolutionary path, and proves that, far from coasting on the considerable laurels on which he could easily rest, he's continuing to grow as a writer and an interpreter—but, most importantly, as a performer, as he leaps from one significant plateau to the next". JazzTimes reviewer, Thomas Conrad commented "The creative capacities of the most important jazz piano player of his generation herein receive their most comprehensive documentation to date".

== Track listing ==
All compositions by Brad Mehldau except as indicated

Disc One:

1. "Storm" - 4:30
2. "It's All Right with Me" (Cole Porter) - 5:22
3. "Secret Love" (Paul Francis Webster, Sammy Fain) - 7:14
4. "Unrequited" - 8:22
5. "Resignation" - 10:25
6. "Trailer Park Ghost" - 10:12
7. "Goodbye Storyteller (For Fred Myrow)" - 7:31
8. "Exit Music (For a Film)" (Radiohead) - 7:47

Disc Two:

1. "Things Behind the Sun" (Nick Drake) - 7:48
2. "Lithium" (Kurt Cobain) - 4:32
3. "Lilac Wine" (James Shelton) - 9:19
4. "Martha My Dear" (John Lennon, Paul McCartney) - 6:56
5. "My Favorite Things" (Richard Rodgers, Oscar Hammerstein II) - 6:31
6. "Dat Dere" (Bobby Timmons) - 5:30

DVD

1. "Storm / It’s All Right With Me"
2. "Secret Love"
3. "Unrequited"
4. "Resignation"
5. "Trailer Park Ghost"
6. "Goodbye Storyteller (For Fred Myrow) / Exit Music (For a Film)"
7. "Things Behind the Sun / Lithium"
8. "Lilac Wine"
9. "Martha My Dear"
10. "My Favorite Things"

== Personnel ==
- Brad Mehldau – piano

== Credits ==
- Produced by Brad Mehldau
- Engineered by Duncan Aldrich
- Mastering by Greg Calbi
- Design by John Gall
- DVD Directed by Samuel Thiebaut
- Cameramen - Cathy Denoel, Christophe Malaprade, Mickaël Altmann
- Lighting by Pierre Redon, Roland Remy
- DVD Sound Engineers - Benoît Gégoud, Hervé Déjardin
