= Metheny/Mehldau =

Metheny Mehldau

Studio album by Pat Metheny, Brad Mehldau
- Released: September 12, 2006
- Recorded: December 2005
- Studio: Right Track, New York City
- Genre: Jazz
- Length: 66:03
- Label: Nonesuch
- Producer: Pat Metheny

Pat Metheny chronology
The Way Up (2005)	Metheny Mehldau (2006)	Metheny/Mehldau Quartet (2007)

Brad Mehldau chronology
Day Is Done (2005)	Metheny Mehldau (2006)	Metheny/Mehldau Quartet (2007)

Professional ratings
Review scores
Source	Rating
AllMusic	4.5/5 stars
The Penguin Guide to Jazz	3/4 stars

Metheny Mehldau is a jazz album released in 2006 by Nonesuch Records. Most of the album is a duet between guitarist Pat Metheny and pianist Brad Mehldau. On two songs, they are accompanied by drummer Jeff Ballard and bassist Larry Grenadier.

== Background ==
Mehldau wrote three songs, while Metheny wrote the rest. "Unrequited" appeared on Mehldau's album, Songs: The Art of the Trio, Vol. III (1998). Metheny's "Say the Brother's Name" is from I Can See Your House from Here (1994), an album he made with guitarist John Scofield. "Ahmid-6" was recorded by Bob Berg on his album Riddles (1994) .

Metheny Mehldau includes tracks from recording sessions that occurred in December, 2005. A second disc, Metheny Mehldau Quartet, was released in 2007 and contains more quartet and duet tracks from the same sessions.

== Track listing ==
All tracks are written by Pat Metheny except where noted.

No.	Title	Writer(s)	Length
1.	"Unrequited"	Mehldau	5:00
2.	"Ahmid-6"		6:35
3.	"Summer Day"		6:25
4.	"Ring of Life"		7:35
5.	"Legend"	Mehldau	7:02
6.	"Find Me in Your Dreams"		6:07
7.	"Say the Brother's Name"		7:14
8.	"Bachelors III"		7:24
9.	"Annie's Bittersweet Cake"	Mehldau	5:32
10.	"Make Peace"		7:06
Total length:			66:03

== Personnel ==
- Pat Metheny – guitars, guitar synthesizer, liner notes
- Brad Mehldau – piano, liner notes
- Larry Grenadier – double bass (tracks 4 and 7)
- Jeff Ballard – drums (tracks 4 and 7)

=== Technical personnel ===
- Pat Metheny – producer
- Robert Hurwitz – executive Producer
- Pete Karam – recording
- Rob Eaton – mixing
- Ted Jensen – mastering at Sterling Sound, NYC, USA
- Doyle Partners – design
- Latifa Metheny – photography
