= Chihiro Yamanaka =

Japanese jazz pianist and composer

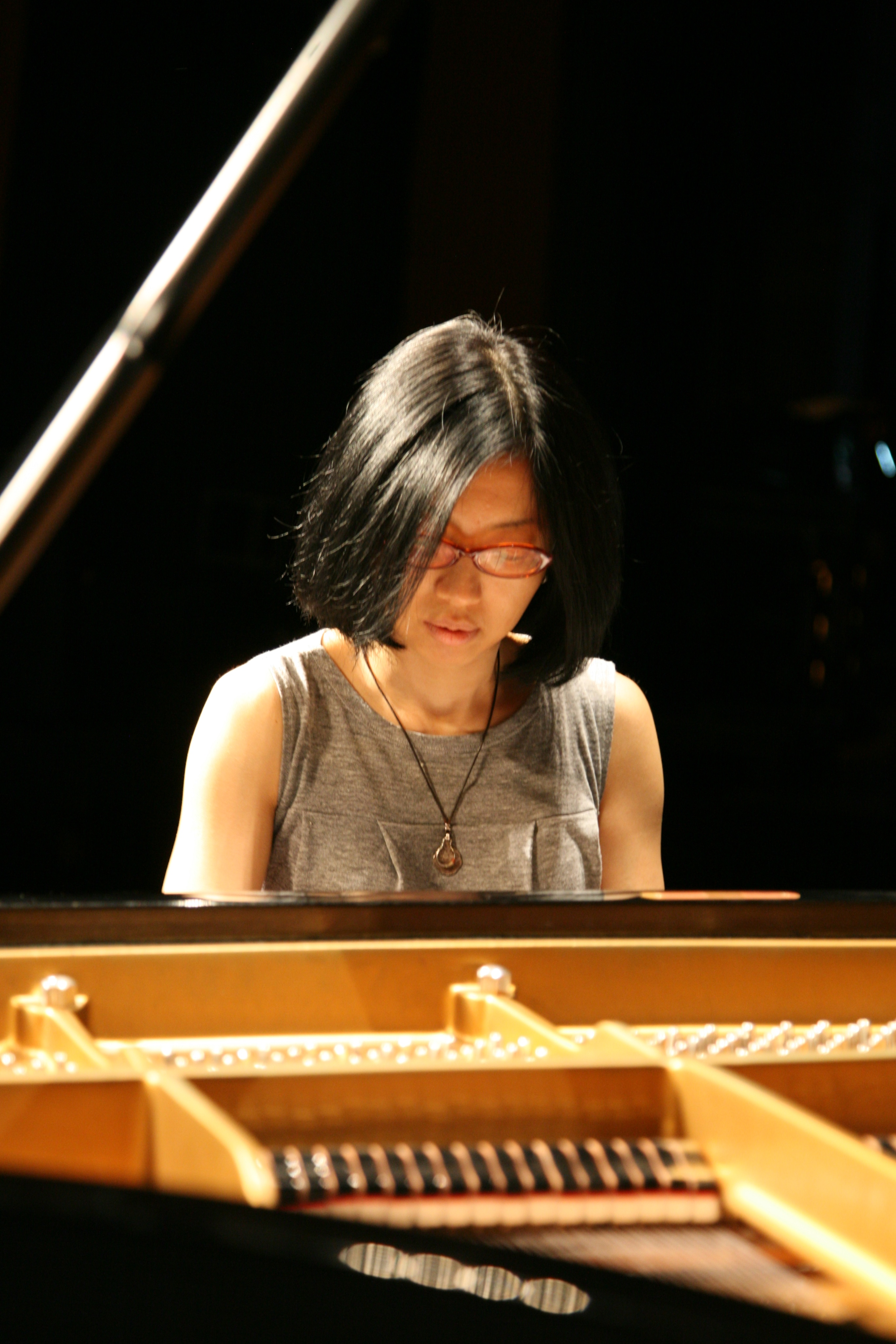
- Yamanaka, 2010

Background information
- Born: 1976 (age 49–50); Kiryū, Gunma, Japan
- Genre: Jazz
- Occupations: Musician, composer
- Instruments: Piano, keyboards
- Labels: Verve, Atelier Sawano
- Website: chihiroyamanaka.net

Chihiro Yamanaka (山中千尋, Yamanaka Chihiro) (born 1976) is a Japanese jazz pianist and composer, born in Kiryū, Gunma Prefecture. As of 2025, she was based in Tokyo. She has released more than 30 albums, most of them on Verve Records.

== Career ==
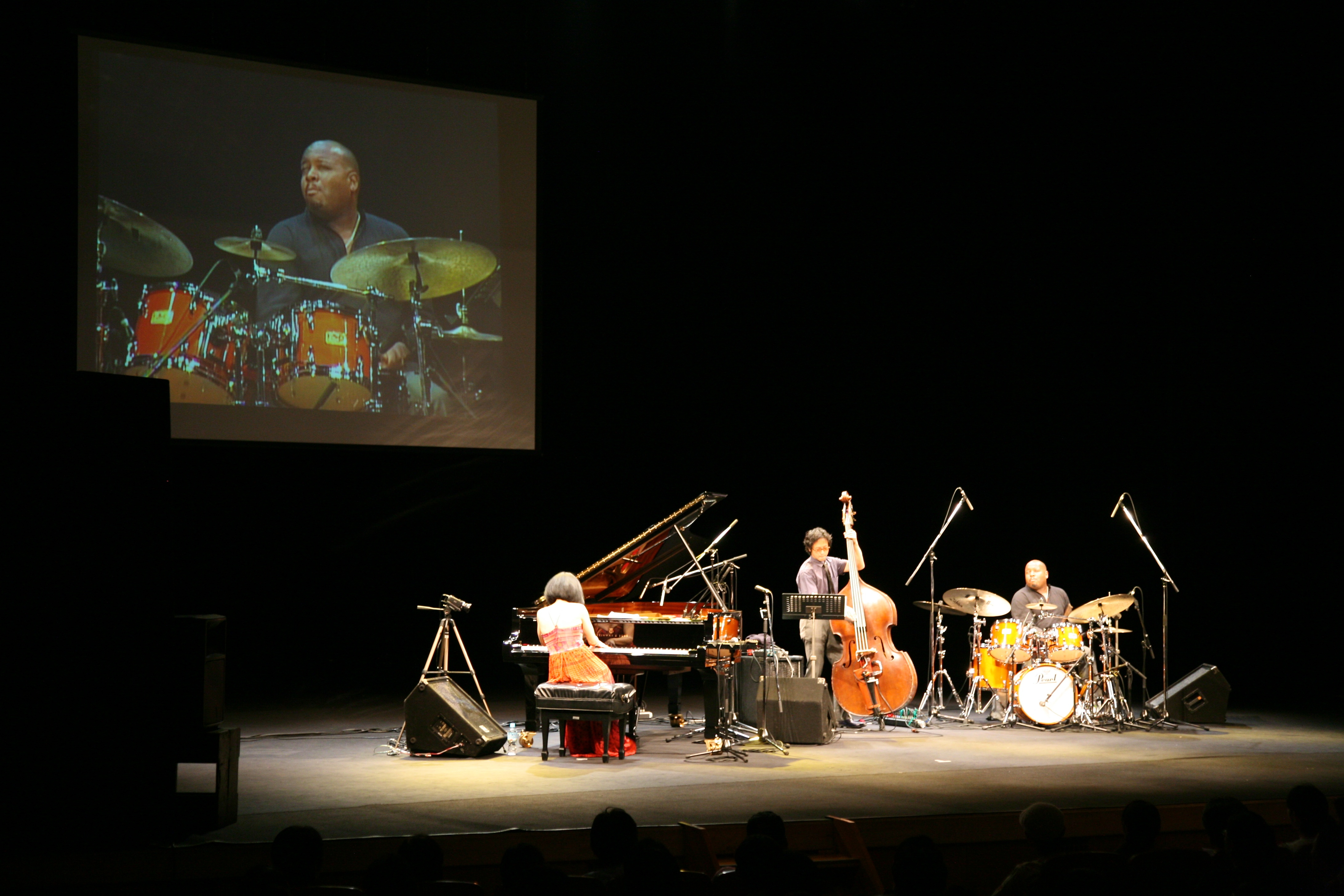
Chihiro Yamanaka Trio Gunma Concert 2010

Yamanaka studied at the Berklee College of Music and is an alumna of Betty Carter's Jazz Ahead residency program at the Kennedy Center. She has played and recorded with the New York-based DIVA Jazz Orchestra, led by Sherrie Maricle, but is best known for her small group recordings, which are typically trios and have featured bassists such as Larry Grenadier and Robert Hurst, and drummers such as Jeff Ballard and Jeff "Tain" Watts.

Yamanaka has toured in Europe, the United States and Japan, and has played at several festivals, including the Umbria Jazz Festival in 2011 (a performance described by the Jazz Times' reviewer as "The biggest surprise of the night [...] Right and left, jaws were dropping", and the Bologna Jazz Festival and Mary Lou Williams Women in Jazz Festival the following year. In 2011 and 2012 Yamanaka played Gershwin's Rhapsody in Blue with symphony orchestras in Japan.

Yamanaka has released more than 20 recordings as a solo artist, principally on the Verve label, most of which have been released internationally, and which include Live in New York, a DVD of her playing at the Iridium Jazz Club in New York. Two of her releases, Forever Begins (2010) and Reminiscence (2011), were given four-star ratings by AllMusic reviewers, the review of the latter concluding with, "Yamanaka is a fierce talent with robust chops, plenty of soul, and a seemingly endless imagination for the musical possibilities of the piano trio".

Yamanaka is one of the 'Frontier Ambassadors' for Kōriyama City.

== Playing style ==
John Fordham commented in 2016 that Yamanaka played, in the nature of Oscar Peterson, "straightahead classic jazz with the kind of showboating virtuosity that makes listeners doubt their senses". "Like Peterson, Yamanaka favours opening a song at a quiet, lounge-jazz sway and winding it up to a sprint just as listeners are settling back in their chairs."

== Discography ==
=== As leader ===
Year	Title	Label
2001	Living Without Friday	Atelier Sawano
2002	When October Goes	Atelier Sawano
2003	Leaning Forward (DVD)	Atelier Sawano
2004	Madrigal	Atelier Sawano
2005	Outside by the Swing	Verve
2006	Lach Doch Mal	Verve
2007	Abyss	Verve
2007	Live in Tokyo (DVD)	Verve
2008	After Hours	Verve
2008	Bravogue	Verve
2009	Runnin' Wild – Tribute to Benny Goodman	Verve
2010	Forever Begins	Verve
2011	Reminiscence	Verve
2011	Live in New York (DVD)	Verve
2012	Still Working	Universal
2012	Because	Verve
2012	After Hours 2	Verve
2013	Molto Cantabile	Verve
2014	Somethin' Blue	Blue Note
2014	Live at Blue Note Tokyo (DVD)	Blue Note/Universal
2015	SYNCOPATION HAZARD	Blue Note/Universal
2015	Best 2005-2015	Blue Note/Universal
2015	The SPHÈRES: Live in OSAKA!!	Blue Note/Universal
2016	Guilty Pleasure	Verve
2017	Monk Studies	Blue Note/Universal
2018	Utopia	Blue Note/Universal
2019	Prima del Tramonto	Blue Note/Universal
2020	Rosa	Blue Note/Universal
2022	Today Is Another Day	Blue Note/Universal
2023	Dolce Vita	Blue Note/Universal
2026	Happy-Go-Lucky	Blue Note/Universal

=== Others ===
With Sherrie Maricle & The Diva Jazz Orchestra

- A Tommy Newsom Tribute (Lightyear Entertainment, 2005)

With Marlene VerPlanck

- It's How You Play the Game (Audiophile, 2004)
