= Blues and Ballads =

Studio album by Brad Mehldau
- Released: June 3, 2016
- Recorded: December 10, 2012; May 12, 2014
- Studios: Avatar Studios, New York City
- Genre: Jazz
- Length: 55:24
- Label: Nonesuch
- Producer: Brad Mehldau

Brad Mehldau chronology
10 Years Solo Live (2004–14)	Blues and Ballads (2012–14)	Seymour Reads the Constitution! (2012–14)

Blues and Ballads is a studio album by jazz pianist Brad Mehldau. It is a piano trio recording, with Larry Grenadier on bass and Jeff Ballard on drums. Mehldau received a Grammy nomination at the end of 2016 for Best Improvised Jazz Solo on the album's "I Concentrate on You".

== Background ==
The previous release by the trio of Brad Mehldau (piano), Larry Grenadier (bass), and Jeff Ballard (drums) was Where Do You Start, in 2012.

== Music and recording ==
All seven of the tracks are covers. The album was recorded at Avatar Studios, New York City, on December 10, 2012, and May 12, 2014.

== Reception ==
Professional ratings
Aggregate scores
Source	Rating
Metacritic	84/100
Review scores
Source	Rating
All About Jazz	4/5 stars
AllMusic	4/5 stars
The Australian	4/5 stars
The Buffalo News	2/4 stars
Down Beat	3.5/5 stars
Financial Times	5/5 stars
The Guardian	4/5 stars
PopMatters	8/10
The Times	5/5 stars
Tom Hull	B+

At Metacritic, that assigns a normalized rating out of 100 to reviews from mainstream critics, the album received an average score of 84, based on six reviews, which indicates "universal acclaim".

The Financial Times reviewer commented that "Each track is a beautifully crafted, richly detailed miniature with its own tale to tell." Peter Hum of Ottawa Citizen wrote: "for those who think Mehldau’s music can be too formidable for their tastes, Blues and Ballads should be a more straightforward but still deeply satisfying delight, as it will be for his legions of devotees". The Times's Chris Pearson wrote, "Brad Mehldau is adept at bending almost any music to the will of the jazz tradition, whether it’s alternative rock or, as heard at the Wigmore Hall last December, establishment baroque. Yet this album has his most traditional song selection yet: four jazz standards, a Beatles ballad and just two contemporary songs, both of which are pretty much Tin Pan Alley pastiches." Dave Gelly in his review for The Guardian stated, "deceptively sweet-sounding set which, once you cotton on to the pianist’s way of treating a few mainly well-known tunes, is absolutely absorbing. Instead of the usual jazz method of improvising on a tune over and over again, known as “playing choruses”, he plays the song with a few variations and then goes into a kind of free meditation on it."

Will Layman of PopMatters added, "The repertoire here, then, creeps up on you. Mehldau and his longstanding trio (with Larry Grenadier on bass and drummer Jeff Ballard) play with a preternatural relaxation and ease throughout, often using a subtle Latin feeling. There is an incredible amount of space within the center of these performances, and those gaps and silences, those pauses between notes and beats, open up huge possibilities that the musicians fill with imagination." Geno Thackara of All About Jazz stated, "The trio continually enjoys the easy back-and-forth of longtime mates without losing any spontaneity. Whether there's some complexity behind a song's structure or not, the results are always pleasing to the ear and no trouble to simply follow if you don't feel like dissecting what's going on. More seriously intense work can wait for another album (or for the listener, another hour). Forward-thinking envelope-pushers deserve a break now and then as much as anyone, and Blues and Ballads makes an enticing rainy-day listen to give their down time and ours a most beautifully cool accompaniment."

== Track listing ==
1. "Since I Fell for You" (Buddy Johnson)
2. "I Concentrate on You" (Cole Porter)
3. "Little Person" (Jon Brion)
4. "Cheryl" (Charlie Parker)
5. "These Foolish Things" (Jack Strachey)
6. "And I Love Her" (John Lennon, Paul McCartney)
7. "My Valentine" (McCartney)

== Personnel ==
- Brad Mehldau – piano
- Larry Grenadier – bass
- Jeff Ballard – drums

== Charts ==
Chart (2016)	Peak position
Belgian Albums (Ultratop Flanders)	43
Belgian Albums (Ultratop Wallonia)	58
French Albums (SNEP)	78
Italian Albums (FIMI)	64
Portuguese Albums (AFP)	26
Spanish Albums (Promusicae)	68
Swiss Albums (Schweizer Hitparade)	88
US Top Jazz Albums (Billboard)	2
