= Not by Chance (album) =

Studio album by Joe Martin
- Released: September 15, 2009
- Recorded: January 2009
- Studio: Sear Sound, New York City
- Genre: Jazz
- Label: Anzic
- Producer: Joe Martin

Professional ratings
Review scores
Source	Rating
AllMusic	3.5/5 stars

Not by Chance is an album by jazz bassist Joe Martin.

== Music and recording ==
The album was recorded at Sear Sound, New York City in January 2009. Martin was also the producer. All but one of the tracks was written by Martin. Chris Potter mostly plays tenor saxophone, but uses bass clarinet on "The Balloon Song" and soprano sax on the title track. The album was released by Anzic Records on September 15, 2009.

== Track listing ==
1. "Semente" – 8:50
2. "In the Meantime" – 8:35
3. "Caché" – 8:26
4. "A Dream" – 9:19
5. "The Balloon Song" – 3:53
6. "Once Before" – 7:15
7. "Far" – 6:03
8. "Not by Chance" – 8:15
9. "The Stoic" – 8:37

== Personnel ==
- Chris Potter – tenor sax, soprano sax, bass clarinet
- Brad Mehldau – piano
- Joe Martin – bass
- Marcus Gilmore – drums
