= Fly (Fly album) =

Studio album by Fly
- Released: February 10, 2004
- Recorded: June 16–18, 2003
- Studio: Sear Sound, New York City
- Genre: Jazz
- Length: 63:45
- Label: Savoy Jazz; SVY 17325
- Producer: Jeff Ballard, Larry Grenadier, Mark Turner

Fly chronology
Fly (2004)	Sky & Country (2008)

Mark Turner chronology
Dharma Days (2001)	Fly (2004)	Sky & Country (2008)

Fly is an album by the band Fly, drummer Jeff Ballard, bassist Larry Grenadier and saxophonist Mark Turner which was recorded in 2003 and released by the Savoy Jazz label the following year.

== Reception ==
Professional ratings
Review scores
Source	Rating
AllMusic	3/5 stars

The AllMusic review by Jonathan Widran states "If your ears are starved for innovative jazz that blends punchy sax lines and dense, wild, worldbeat-flavored bass and drum rhythms, let this newly formed trio with an amazing pedigree fill the bill ... Fly is definitely a cooperative by three major jazz talents".

In JazzTimes, Aaron Steinberg observed that "The spare, layered and frequently funky postbop debut finds the band constantly shifting support and frontline roles as well as melodic and harmonic duties between each member".

== Track listing ==
All compositions by Jeff Ballard except where noted

1. "Child's Play" – 7:12
2. "Fly Mr. Freakjar" (Ballard, Larry Grenadier, Mark Turner) – 8:29
3. "Stark" (Mark Turner) – 6:50
4. "JJ" (Grenadier) – 7:21
5. "State of the Union" (Grenadier) – 7:30
6. "Emergence / Resurgence" (Grenadier) – 4:38
7. "Todas Las Cosas Se Van" (Reid Anderson) – 8:18
8. "Piano Tune" – 2:55
9. "Spanish Castle Magic" (Jimi Hendrix) – 5:43
10. "Lone" – 4:33

== Personnel ==
- Mark Turner – bass clarinet, soprano saxophone, tenor saxophone
- Larry Grenadier – bass
- Jeff Ballard – drums
