= Year of the Snake (album) =

Studio album by Fly
- Released: April 4, 2012
- Recorded: January 2011
- Studios: Avatar (New York, New York)
- Genre: Jazz
- Length: 60:42
- Labels: ECM; ECM 2235
- Producer: Manfred Eicher

Fly chronology
Sky & Country (2008)	Year of the Snake (2012)

Mark Turner chronology
Sky & Country (2008)	Year of the Snake (2012)	Lathe of Heaven (2014)

Year of the Snake is the third album by Fly, consisting drummer Jeff Ballard, bassist Larry Grenadier and saxophonist Mark Turner, recorded in January 2011 and released on ECM in Aprilthe following year.

== Reception ==
Professional ratings
Review scores
Source	Rating
AllMusic	4/5 stars
All About Jazz	4.5/5 stars
The Guardian	4/5 stars

The AllMusic review by Thom Jurek states "Of Fly's three recordings to date, Year of the Snake is the most unusual and beguiling; it unhinges preconceived notions about the saxophone trio with complete freedom minus the chaos of disorder."

All About Jazz reviewer John Kelman said, "what Year of the Snake demonstrates with crystal clarity is that each player's language, command and sophistication continue to evolve as the result of their efforts; but it's only as Fly that they can truly exercise everything they've honed with complete and utter freedom. Year of the Snake will undoubtedly challenge those familiar with Turner, Grenadier and Ballard's work in intrinsically accessible contexts."

The Guardian's John Fordham awarded the album 4 stars noting "the New York trio Fly is an exchange between equals, not a sax-led charge over a rhythm section. Though it falls into the territory sometimes dubbed "chamber-jazz", Year of the Snake is up there with Fly's best work, with its rustling fast grooves and languid horn lines, and pieces that open on almost impossibly pure high-register long tones."

In JazzTimes, Thomas Conrad observed that "Fly plays cerebral, rapt, interactive chamber jazz, deriving a wide range of textures and colors from three instruments. Mark Turner often ascends to the tenor’s piping, keening altissimo register. Larry Grenadier often plays arco bass, in drones and murmurs and sighs. The asymmetrical, spare designs of drummer Jeff Ballard imply time rather than keep it ... The music of Fly is sophisticated and sincere and enormously competent. These are important virtues, but likely to inspire more admiration than love."

== Track listing ==
All compositions by Jeff Ballard, Larry Grenadier and Mark Turner except where noted

1. "The Western Lands I" (Turner) – 2:27
2. "Festival Tune" (Turner) – 6:06
3. "The Western Lands II" – 0:35
4. "Brothersister" (Turner) – 7:35
5. "Diorite" (Ballard) – 6:15
6. "Kingston" (Grenadier) – 10:11
7. "Salt and Pepper" (Ballard, Turner) – 5:04
8. "The Western Lands III" – 3:07
9. "Benj" (Ballard) – 5:17
10. "Year of the Snake" (Turner) – 9:00
11. "The Western Lands IV" – 2:37
12. "The Western Lands V" – 1:49

== Personnel ==
- Mark Turner – tenor saxophone
- Larry Grenadier – bass
- Jeff Ballard – drums
