= Lathe of Heaven (album) =

Studio album by the Mark Turner Quartet
- Released: September 5, 2014
- Recorded: June, 2013
- Studios: Avatar (New York, New York)
- Genre: Jazz
- Length: 58:17
- Label: ECM 2357
- Producer: Manfred Eicher

Mark Turner chronology
Year of the Snake (2012)	Lathe of Heaven (2014)	Temporary Kings (2018)

Lathe of Heaven is an album by the Mark Turner Quartet recorded in June 2013 and released on ECM September the following year. The quartet features trumpeter Avishai Cohen and rhythm section Joe Martin and Marcus Gilmore. The album’s title references Ursula K. Le Guin’s 1971 science fiction novel of the same name.

== Reception ==
Professional ratings
Review scores
Source	Rating
AllMusic	4.5/5 stars
All About Jazz	4.5/5 stars
The Guardian	4/5 stars

The AllMusic review by Matt Collar states "with his Lathe of Heaven Turner strips back layers of jazz style and language to reveal a sound that is both familiar and utterly new."

All About Jazz reviewer John Kelman said, "As cerebral as Turner's music can be and as considered as his compositional constructs are—oftentimes building surprising significance from the smallest of concepts—Lathe of Heaven manages to stir the soul as much as it challenges the mind."

The Guardian's John Fordham awarded the album 4 stars noting "The set sometimes sounds like Birth of the Cool tunes floated over a 21st-century rhythmic concept, and it’ll be a 2014 polls contender for sure."

In JazzTimes, Michael J. West was less enthusiastic, observing that "Even cerebral musicians need to connect emotionally with their audiences. Tenor saxophonist Mark Turner, who is as cerebral as they come, struggles with this task on Lathe of Heaven.... Turner has the technical tools to build tension and suspense in his music, but flounders when it comes to making them relatable."

On NPR's Fresh Air, Kevin Whitehead said "A lot of action happens at thoughtful medium tempos, and there's beautiful dissonance in the two-horn harmonies.... The music doesn't give up its secrets too fast as he parcels out his themes and subthemes establishing mood through the slow accumulation of details. The slinky melodies map out the terrain foreshadowing the improvised action and interaction. That lets Mark Turner get of novelistic unity of effect. This clean plotting makes a cooler brand of jazz cool all over again."

== Track listing ==
All compositions by Mark Turner

1. "Lathe of Heaven" – 6:40
2. "Year of the Rabbit" – 12:20
3. "Ethan's Line" – 8:01
4. "The Edenist" – 8:11
5. "Sonnet for Stevie" – 12:57
6. "Brother Sister 2" – 10:09

== Personnel ==
=== Mark Turner Quartet ===
- Mark Turner – tenor saxophone
- Avishai Cohen – trumpet
- Joe Martin – bass
- Marcus Gilmore – drums
