= Seymour Reads the Constitution! =

Studio album by Brad Mehldau
- Released: May 19, 2018
- Recorded: 2012, 2014
- Studio: Power Station (New York City)
- Genre: Jazz
- Length: 64:16
- Label: Nonesuch
- Producer: Brad Mehldau

Brad Mehldau chronology
Blues and Ballads (2012–14)	Seymour Reads the Constitution! (2012–14)	Chris Thile & Brad Mehldau (2015–16)

Seymour Reads the Constitution! is an album by pianist Brad Mehldau. The trio recording, with Larry Grenadier on bass and Jeff Ballard on drums, was released by Nonesuch Records in 2018. The pianist reported that the melody and name of the title track came from a dream, during which actor Philip Seymour Hoffman read to him. The album received two Grammy nominations at the end of 2018.

== Background ==
The trio of Brad Mehldau (piano), Larry Grenadier (bass), and Jeff Ballard (drums) had recorded together since 2005; their previous album was Blues and Ballads, which was released in 2016. Since then, Mehldau albums had included duets with Chris Thile, and solo piano recordings of Bach pieces. The title track of the new recording came from a dream that Mehldau had, in which actor Philip Seymour Hoffman read the United States Constitution to him. The pianist recounted that Hoffman "read in a measured but slightly melancholic voice, resigned and stoic all at once. Behind his voice was the melody of what became 'Seymour Reads the Constitution'. When I woke up I grabbed the initial melody before it faded away and wrote the song." Hoffman died less than two weeks later.

== Music and recording ==
The album was recorded at Avatar Studios, New York City in 2012 and 2014. It was produced by Mehldau.

"Spiral" contains "a repeated motif with downward-moving harmonies and builds into a drum-feature peak". "Mehldau re-harmonises and toys with the baroque opening line of 'Ten Tune' while Ballard is at full stretch; the piece plays out with the pianist unaccompanied, spinning variations with such purpose that they appear pre-composed."

== Release and reception ==
Professional ratings
Review scores
Source	Rating
All About Jazz	4.5/5 stars
AllMusic	4/5 stars
The Arts Desk	5/5 stars
DownBeat	4/5 stars
Financial Times	4/5 stars
Jazz Forum	5/5 stars
Jazzwise	4/5 stars
PopMatters	9/10
RTÉ.ie	3.5/5 stars
Tom Hull	B+

Seymour Reads the Constitution! was released by Nonesuch Records on May 19, 2018. The AllMusic reviewer wrote that "much of the album has a balmy, laid-back quality as if it were recorded during a sunny afternoon at home." The Financial Times reviewer commented that "there's no mistaking that Mehldau's piano is the lead voice. Particularly when, as on this album, the American displays the iron logic that made his recent solo album After Bach such a standout." DownBeat suggested that the performance of "Spiral" "is strong enough that it might set a new bar for what counts as The Art of the Trio [the title of a series of Mehldau albums, beginning with The Art of the Trio Volume One]."

The album received two Grammy nominations at the end of 2018. It was nominated for Best Jazz Instrumental Album, and the track "De-Dah" was nominated for Best Improvised Jazz Solo.

== Track listing ==
1. "Spiral" (Brad Mehldau) – 8:33
2. "Seymour Reads the Constitution" (Mehldau) – 8:03
3. "Almost Like Being in Love" (Frederick Loewe) – 5:41
4. "De-Dah" (Elmo Hope) – 8:42
5. "Friends" (Brian Wilson) – 8:15
6. "Ten Tune" (Mehldau) – 10:07
7. "Great Day" (Paul McCartney) – 5:54
8. "Beatrice" (Sam Rivers) – 8:54

== Personnel ==
- Brad Mehldau – piano
- Larry Grenadier – bass
- Jeff Ballard – drums

== Chart performance ==
Chart (2018)	Peak position
Belgian Albums (Ultratop Flanders)	137
Belgian Albums (Ultratop Wallonia)	198
Swiss Albums (Schweizer Hitparade)	87
