= Live at the Village Vanguard (Paul Motian album) =

Live album by Paul Motian
- Released: 30 May 2007
- Recorded: December 8–10, 2006
- Genre: Jazz
- Length: 56:51
- Label: Winter & Winter
- Producer: Stefan Winter

Paul Motian chronology
| Time and Time Again (2006) | Live at the Village Vanguard (2007) | Live at the Village Vanguard Vol. II (2008) |

Live at the Village Vanguard is a live album by Paul Motian's Trio 2000 + Two recorded at the Village Vanguard and released on the German Winter & Winter label in 2007. It features Motian’s trio with tenor saxophonist Chris Potter and double bassist Larry Grenadier, along with guests Masabumi Kikuchi on piano, and alto saxophonist Greg Osby.

== Reception ==
The Allmusic review by Ken Dryden awarded the album 4½ stars, stating, "This is easily some of Paul Motian's most challenging music as a leader, while the Village Vanguard audience was obviously transfixed with the performances, as they remain very quiet to soak in every nuance of them".

Professional ratings
Review scores
| Source | Rating |
|---|---|
| Allmusic | 4.5/5 stars |

== Track listing ==
All compositions by Paul Motian except as indicated

1. "Standard Time" - 13:40
2. "If You Could See Me Now" (Tadd Dameron) - 12:25
3. "Olivia's Dream" - 10:02
4. "Morrock" - 8:04
5. "Last Call" - 12:35

- Recorded at the Village Vanguard in New York City on December 8–10, 2006

== Personnel ==
- Paul Motian - drums
- Chris Potter - tenor saxophone
- Greg Osby - alto saxophone
- Masabumi Kikuchi - piano
- Larry Grenadier - bass
