= Yam Yam (album) =

Studio album by Mark Turner
- Released: May 2, 1995
- Recorded: December 12, 1994, PRM Studio, New York, NY
- Genre: Jazz
- Length: 71:29
- Label: Criss Cross
- Producer: Gerry Teekens

Mark Turner chronology
Yam Yam (1995)	The Music of Mercedes Rossy (1998)

Professional ratings
Review scores
Source	Rating
AllMusic	4.0/5 stars
The Penguin Guide to Jazz Recordings	4/4 stars

Yam Yam is an album by the Mark Turner Quintet released by Criss Cross Jazz in 1995. It was Turner's debut recording as a leader. It was re-issued as a double LP in 2022.

== Track listing ==
All compositions by Mark Turner except as indicated.

1. "Tune Number One" – 9:00
2. "Cubism" (Kurt Rosenwinkel) – 7:16
3. "Yam Yam I" – 10:47
4. "Moment's Notice" (John Coltrane) – 6:10
5. "Isolation" – 7:07
6. "Subtle Tragedy" (Brad Mehldau) – 9:59
7. "Zürich" – 7:49
8. "Blues" – 5:58
9. "Yam Yam II" – 7:20

== Personnel ==
- Mark Turner – tenor saxophone
- Brad Mehldau – piano
- Kurt Rosenwinkel – guitar
- Larry Grenadier – double bass
- Jorge Rossy – drums
