= Love Sublime =

Studio album by Brad Mehldau and Renée Fleming
- Released: June 27, 2006
- Recorded: January 10–11, 2006
- Studio: SUNY Purchase Performing Arts Center (Purchase, New York)
- Genre: Classical
- Length: 48:19
- Label: Nonesuch
- Producer: Steven Epstein

Brad Mehldau chronology
Brad Mehldau Trio Live (2006)	Love Sublime (2006)	Live in Marciac (2006)

Love Sublime is an album by Brad Mehldau and Renée Fleming.

== Background ==
Prior to this album, Brad Mehldau had built a reputation as a jazz pianist, particularly with his trio. Soprano Renée Fleming was known for "her operatic performances and recitals of classical art songs". Mehldau's playing often encompassed classical music, while Fleming was interested in being a jazz vocalist from her time at college.

Rainer Maria Rilke wrote the poems collected in The Book of Hours around the turn of the twentieth century.

Mehldau worked on the music for around two years. He and Fleming performed all of the tracks at Zankel Hall.

== Music and recording ==
Poems from Rilke's The Book of Hours were used. New, free translations into English were employed. Other tracks were based on some of the Blue Estuaries poems of Louise Bogan; these were written in strophes. The title track was written by Fleurine.

All of the music was either composed or "well-prepared if not entirely written".

Mehldau's "settings capture the sense of Rilke's spiritual solitude and existential dread, transfixing the poet's struggle with belief in a steely light that illuminates his final declaration of faith as clearly as his doubts and fears." "Some of the most striking effects are achieved with bleak, chiming chords, evoking Messiaen, but Mehldau parallels the poets' most involved images with passages of close-packed counterpoint and dense chording."

There are some links between the lyrical content and the music: "In 'Tears in Sleep', for example, the vocal line slides over slippery harmonies, suggesting dreamy restlessness."

== Release and reception ==
Professional ratings
Review scores
Source	Rating
AllMusic	3.5/5 stars
The Austin Chronicle	1/5 stars

The album was released by Nonesuch Records on June 27, 2006.

Opinions were split partly on genre lines. The Austin Chronicle reviewer stated "Jazz buyers beware", while the Financial Times concluded that "Opera and jazz might seem to be polar opposites, but on this album [...] they blend brilliantly." Gramophone asserted that "Fleming sings with plush tone and deep feeling, often sacrificing textual clarity in the process, and her swoops and swoons help bring out the connections to jazz."

== Track listing ==
1. The Book of Hours: Love Poems to God: Your First Word Was "Light" (Mehldau/Rilke) – 5:28
2. The Book of Hours: Love Poems to God: The Hour Is Striking So Close Above Me (Mehldau/Rilke) – 5:09
3. The Book of Hours: Love Poems to God: I Love the Dark Hours of My Being (Mehldau/Rilke) – 4:35
4. The Book of Hours: Love Poems to God: I Love You, Gentlest of Ways (Mehldau/Rilke) – 7:02
5. The Book of Hours: Love Poems to God: No One Lives His Life (Mehldau/Rilke) – 2:36
6. The Book of Hours: Love Poems to God: His Caring Is a Nightmare to Us (Mehldau/Rilke) – 2:31
7. The Book of Hours: Love Poems to God: Extinguish My Eyes, I'll Go On Seeing You (Mehldau/Rilke) – 6:13
8. The Blue Estuaries: Tears in Sleep (Mehldau/Bogan) – 2:31
9. The Blue Estuaries: Memory (Mehldau/Bogan) – 3:25
10. The Blue Estuaries: A Tale (Mehldau/Bogan) – 4:28
11. Love Sublime (Mehldau/Fleurine) – 4:20

== Personnel ==
- Brad Mehldau – piano
- Renée Fleming – vocals
