= Time and Time Again (album) =

Studio album by Paul Motian
- Released: 20 February 2007 (Japan); 2 March 2007
- Recorded: May 2006
- Studio: Avatar (New York, New York)
- Genre: Jazz
- Length: 51:45
- Label: ECM; ECM 1992
- Producer: Manfred Eicher

Paul Motian chronology
On Broadway Vol. 4 or The Paradox of Continuity (2005)	Time and Time Again (2007)	Live at the Village Vanguard (2007)

Time and Time Again is an album by jazz drummer Paul Motian recorded in May 2006 released on ECM the following year. The trio features guitarist Bill Frisell and tenor saxophonist Joe Lovano.

== Reception ==
The AllMusic review by Thom Jurek awarded the album 4½ stars, stating "On Time and Time Again, the band's sense of space, color, and texture reaches outward in a more pronounced manner."

Professional ratings
Review scores
Source	Rating
AllMusic	4.5/5 stars
The Penguin Guide to Jazz Recordings	3/4 stars

== Track listing ==
All compositions by Paul Motian except as indicated

1. "Cambodia" – 4:30
2. "Wednesday" – 3:57
3. "Onetwo" – 4:45
4. "Whirlpool" – 3:12
5. "In Remembrance of Things Past" – 7:58
6. "K.T." – 3:03
7. "This Nearly Was Mine" (Oscar Hammerstein II, Richard Rodgers) – 5:07
8. "Party Line" (Joe Lovano) – 7:43
9. "Light Blue" (Thelonious Monk) – 4:03
10. "Time and Time Again" – 7:27

== Personnel ==
- Paul Motian – drums
- Bill Frisell – electric guitar
- Joe Lovano – tenor saxophone
