= Day Is Done (album) =

Studio album by Brad Mehldau Trio
- Released: September 27, 2005
- Recorded: March 13 & 14, 2005
- Studio: Avatar (New York, New York)
- Genre: Jazz
- Length: 69:56
- Label: Nonesuch; 7559-79910-2
- Producer: Brad Mehldau

Brad Mehldau chronology
House on Hill (2002–05)	Day Is Done (2005)	Metheny/Mehldau (2005)

Day Is Done is an album by the Brad Mehldau Trio released on the Nonesuch label in 2005. The album was Mehldau's first to feature Jeff Ballard, who replaced the Mehldau Trio's original drummer Jorge Rossy.

== Reception ==
Professional ratings
Review scores
Source	Rating
AllMusic	4/5 stars
The Guardian	4/5 stars
The Irish Times	4/5 stars
The Penguin Guide to Jazz	3.5/4 stars

AllMusic awarded the album 4 stars and in its review by Thom Jurek, stated "Day Is Done is another exceptional chapter in the Mehldau catalog, one that showcases a willingness to stretch itself to the breaking point and open up the band to a wider array of approaches".

The Guardian's John Fordham gave it a 4 star rating and observed "Devoted fans need not panic: this album has the characteristic absentmindedly drifting, cannily misleading intros, the gathering clamour of melodies and countermelodies and the irresistible blend of song shapes, ambiance and impressionism. However, this is a faster, more jubilant and less trancelike Mehldau band. Not necessarily better – just noticeably different".

On All About Jazz, John Dworkin wrote "Day Is Done, is another addition to an increasingly impressive collection". On the same site John Kelman noted "Day is Done is both a logical progression and a radical shift for Mehldau, and evident indication that it's possible—and maybe even important—to mess with success".

JazzTimes reviewer, David R. Adler noted "Brad Mehldau's first trio recording for Nonesuch is also his first without Jorge Rossy at the drums. Jeff Ballard, Rossy's replacement, is far from a stranger to Mehldau and bassist Larry Grenadier, and it isn't surprising that a drummer this brilliant should take to the trio like a fish to water. But that's not to say that Day Is Done lacks surprises".

== Track listing ==
All compositions by Brad Mehldau except as indicated

1. "Knives Out" (Radiohead) – 8:29
2. "Alfie" (Burt Bacharach, Hal David) – 3:46
3. "Martha My Dear" (John Lennon, Paul McCartney) – 4:38
4. "Day Is Done" (Nick Drake) – 9:26
5. "Artis" – 6:21
6. "Turtle Town" – 6:18
7. "She's Leaving Home" (Lennon, McCartney) – 9:07
8. "Granada" (Chris Cheek) – 7:30
9. "50 Ways to Leave Your Lover" (Paul Simon) – 8:32
10. "No Moon at All" (Redd Evans, David Mann) – 5:49

== Personnel ==
- Brad Mehldau – Piano
- Larry Grenadier – Bass (except "Martha My Dear")
- Jeff Ballard – Drums (except "Martha My Dear")

== Credits ==
- Produced by Brad Mehldau
- Engineered by James Farber
- Mastering by Mark Wilder
- Design by Doyle Partners
- Photography by Diane Cook, Len Jenshel and Roberto Masotti
