= Live at the Village Vanguard Vol. II (Paul Motian album) =

Live album by Paul Motian
- Released: 6 June 2008
- Recorded: December 8–10, 2006
- Genre: Jazz
- Length: 54: 26
- Label: Winter & Winter
- Producer: Stefan Winter

Paul Motian chronology
Live at the Village Vanguard (2007)	Live at the Village Vanguard Vol. II (2008)	Live at the Village Vanguard Vol. III (2010)

Live at the Village Vanguard Vol. II is a live album by Paul Motian's Trio 2000 + Two, recorded at the Village Vanguard and released on the German Winter & Winter label in 2008. Like his previous album, it features tenor saxophonist Chris Potter, double bassist Larry Grenadier, pianist Masabumi Kikuchi, alto saxophonist Greg Osby, and new participant Mat Maneri on viola.

== Reception ==
The Allmusic review by Ken Dryden awarded the album 4 stars, stating: "The Vanguard audience devours this powerful music, restraining themselves until each number is complete".

Professional ratings
Review scores
Source	Rating
Allmusic	4/5 stars

== Track listing ==
All compositions by Paul Motian except as indicated

1. "Till We Meet Again" (Richard A. Whiting) - 7:11
2. "Sunflower" - 5:56
3. "The Third Walk" - 10:28
4. "Ten" - 9:13
5. "The Divider" - 9:06
6. "If You Could See Me Now" (Tadd Dameron) - 2:25
7. "Fiasco" - 10:03

- Recorded at the Village Vanguard in New York City on December 8–10, 2006

== Personnel ==
- Paul Motian - drums
- Chris Potter - tenor saxophone
- Larry Grenadier - bass

+

- Greg Osby - alto saxophone
- Mat Maneri - viola
- Masabumi Kikuchi - piano
