= Dharma Days =

Studio album by Mark Turner
- Released: May 8, 2001
- Recorded: January 29–February 1, 2001
- Studio: Sear Sound, New York City
- Genre: Jazz
- Length: 64:08
- Label: Warner Bros.
- Producer: Matt Pierson

Mark Turner chronology
Ballad Session (2000)	Dharma Days (2001)	Fly (2004)

Dharma Days is an album by saxophonist Mark Turner which was recorded in 2001 and released by the Warner Bros. label.

== Reception ==
Professional ratings
Review scores
Source	Rating
AllMusic	4/5 stars

The AllMusic review by William Ruhlmann states "Dharma Days is a virtual duo album with guitarist Kurt Rosenwinkel. ... the heart of both musicians' music is their interplay, which depends on a contrast between Turner's long, relaxed lines and Rosenwinkel's fast, anxious fretwork".

All About Jazz reviewer David Adler said, "Dharma Days doesn’t quite stir the adrenaline to the degree that the live show does, the album is still a triumph, capturing a live feel to a far greater degree than many of Turner’s previous offerings ... Turner’s labyrinthine lines and daunting harmonic language continue to set him apart from all of today’s young tenor stars. His conceptual contributions to the music are becoming nothing short of immense".

In JazzTimes, John Litweiler observed that "Mark Turner’s tenor-sax tone is personal indeed: light, especially in his high ranges, and almost wholly uninflected ... Changes of group textures, tempo and direction are frequent. The Turner quartet’s idiom is a latter-day version of the modal-to-free explorations by early ’60s Blue Note youth (Hill, Chambers, Hutcherson, etc.). It was a slippery music then, and no wonder that this group occasionally slips, too ... The long-tone, wistful ballad moods on this CD become repetitious, but the peppery pieces are full of life and should be heard".

The Washington Post's Mike Joyce wrote "there isn't a performance on Dharma Days, Turner's latest and most accomplished release, that sounds as if it were arranged with even the vaguest commercial calculation in mind. Not that the music is inaccessible. Far from it. Turner's writing -- he penned all of the tunes here -- has a curious logic and lyricism of its own. Sleek but never slick, his compositions are often laced with hip unison passages and intricately designed interludes".

== Track listing ==
All compositions by Mark Turner

1. "Iverson's Odyssey" – 7:30
2. "Deserted Floor" – 6:00
3. "Myron's World" – 10:48
4. "We Three" – 5:37
5. "Jacky's Place" – 6:02
6. "Casa Oscura" – 9:49
7. "Zürich" – 3:01
8. "Dharma Days" – 8:39
9. "Seven Points" – 6:27

== Personnel ==
- Mark Turner – tenor saxophone
- Kurt Rosenwinkel – guitar
- Reid Anderson – bass
- Nasheet Waits – drums
