= Stairway to the Stars (album) =

Studio album by Miki Yamanaka
- Released: October 1, 2021
- Recorded: August 8, 2020
- Genre: Jazz
- Length: 57:34
- Label: Outside in Music
- Producer: Miki Yamanaka

Miki Yamanaka chronology
Human Dust Suite (2020)	Stairway to the Stars (2021)	Shades of Rainbow (2023)

Professional ratings
Review scores
Source	Rating
Jazzwise	3/5 stars

Stairway to the Stars is a 2021 album by Miki Yamanaka released on the independent Outside in Music label. Initially slated to be recorded live at Mezzrow's Jazz Club, it was ultimately recorded at Yamanka's home studio due to the COVID-19 pandemic.

== Track listing ==
All compositions by Miki Yamanaka except as indicated

1. "Cheryl" (Charlie Parker) – 07:55
2. "My Melancholy Baby" – 06:05
3. "Eiderdown" (Steve Swallow) – 06:57
4. "Ask Me Now" (Thelonious Monk) – 07:40
5. "Wonder" – 05:53
6. "Oatmeal" – 07:30
7. "Stairway to the Stars" (Frank Signorelli, Matt Malneck, Mitchell Parish) – 08:24
8. "Tea for Two" (Irving Caesar, Vincent Youmans) – 07:07

== Personnel ==
=== Performance ===
- Orlando le Fleming – double bass
- Miki Yamanaka – piano
- Mark Turner – tenor saxophone

=== Production ===
- Mixing, mastering – Katsuhiko Naito
- Design – Alma Macbride
- Recording engineer – Matt Marantz
