= Sky & Country =

Studio album by Fly
- Released: March 4, 2009
- Recorded: February and June 2008
- Studios: Avatar (New York, New York)
- Genre: Jazz
- Length: 67:39
- Labels: ECM; ECM 2067
- Producer: Manfred Eicher

Fly chronology
Fly (2004)	Sky & Country (2009)	Year of the Snake (2012)

Sky & Country is the second album by Fly—consisting of drummer Jeff Ballard, bassist Larry Grenadier and saxophonist Mark Turner—recorded in 2008 and released on ECM the following year.

== Reception ==
Professional ratings
Review scores
Source	Rating
AllMusic	3.5/5 stars
All About Jazz	4/5 stars
All About Jazz	4/5 stars
The Guardian	4/5 stars

The AllMusic review by Michael G. Nastos states "This is not a typical ECM recording, as it is more straight-ahead modern mainstream jazz, and not nearly the European classical esoteric or ethereal music the label is known for. There's real teamwork in executing this type of jazz that borrows from Blue Note label styles, John Coltrane, or Wayne Shorter, and moves the music forward without a serrated edge or overtly complex harmonic blowing."

All About Jazz reviewer John Kelman said, "Delicate as a feather yet never lacking in substantive weight, Sky & Country is an album that will alter the perception of what saxophone trios can be." On the same site Jerry D'Souza observed "The music has impeccable character in its ability to evolve and break open into some majestic improvisation. Turner gives each phrase a distinctive air, whether it is in the sinuous curl of the soprano sax or the warm overtones of the tenor."

The Guardian's John Fordham awarded the album 4 stars noting "somehow, this close-listening trio manage to join Turner's long lines and airy speculations to Grenadier's busy countermelodies and Ballard's rattling polyrhythms without sounding like a forced marriage. The clipped and edgy melodies of hip-hop and rap-influenced jazz are woven into the lyrical forms of an earlier era ... It's clever, expert, 100% engaged, and very musical."

== Track listing ==
All compositions by Mark Turner except where noted

1. "Lady B" (Jeff Ballard) – 7:24
2. "Sky & Country" (Ballard) – 6:38
3. "Elena Berenjena" – 5:15
4. "CJ" (Larry Grenadier) – 7:29
5. "Dharma Days" – 5:06
6. "Anandananda" – 10:35
7. "Perla Morena" (Ballard) – 5:46
8. "Transfigured" (Grenadier) – 8:36
9. "Super Sister" – 10:50

== Personnel ==
=== Fly ===
- Mark Turner – tenor saxophone, soprano saxophone
- Larry Grenadier – bass
- Jeff Ballard – drums

== Charts ==
Chart performance for Sky & Country
Chart (2026)	Peak position
Swedish Jazz Albums (Sverigetopplistan)	17
