= On Broadway Vol. 4 or The Paradox of Continuity =

Studio album by Paul Motian
- Released: June 21, 2006
- Recorded: November 21–23, 2005
- Genre: Jazz
- Length: 66:10
- Label: Winter & Winter
- Producer: Stefan Winter

Paul Motian chronology
I Have the Room Above Her (2004)	On Broadway Vol. 4 or The Paradox of Continuity (2006)	Time and Time Again (2006)

On Broadway Vol. 4 or The Paradox of Continuity is an album by Paul Motian and the Trio 2000 + One released on the German Winter & Winter label in 2006. The album follows on from the first three volumes of Motian's On Broadway Series featuring features performances of Broadway show tunes. It includes Motian's trio with saxophonist Chris Potter and double bassist Larry Grenadier, along with vocalist Rebecca Martin and pianist Masabumi Kikuchi.

== Reception ==
The Allmusic review by Jonathan Widran awarded the album 3 stars, stating, "these are thoughtful, sparse arrangements..." and calling it a "low-key, sensual affair".

Professional ratings
Review scores
Source	Rating
Allmusic	3/5 stars
The Penguin Guide to Jazz Recordings	3/4 stars

== Track listing ==
1. "The Last Dance" (Jimmy Van Heusen, Sammy Cahn) – 5:13
2. "Tea for Two" (Vincent Youmans, Irving Caesar) – 4:07
3. "In a Shanty in Old Shanty Town" (Ira Schuster, Jack Little) – 3:08
4. "Never Let Me Go" (Jay Livingston, Ray Evans) – 7:08
5. "Never Let Me Go" (Livingston, Evans) – 4:57
6. "The Folks Who Live On the Hill" (Oscar Hammerstein II, Jerome Kern) – 4:56
7. "Everything Happens to Me" (Tom Adair, Matt Dennis) – 3:58
8. "Last Night When We Were Young" (Harold Arlen, Yip Harburg) – 8:05
9. "Born to Be Blue" (Mel Tormé, Robert Wells) – 5:37
10. "Brother, Can You Spare a Dime?" (Jay Gorney, Harburg) – 2:45
11. "I Loves You Porgy" (George Gershwin, Ira Gershwin) – 8:11
12. "You're Getting to Be a Habit with Me" (Al Dubin, Harry Warren) – 3:53
13. "How Long Has This Been Going On?" (Gershwin, Gershwin) – 4:03

== Personnel ==
- Paul Motian – drums
- Chris Potter – tenor saxophone
- Larry Grenadier – bass

with

- Masabumi Kikuchi – piano (tracks 1, 4, 5, 8, 11)
- Rebecca Martin – vocals (on all tracks, except 1, 4, 5, 8, 11)
