= SFJAZZ Collective =

American jazz ensemble

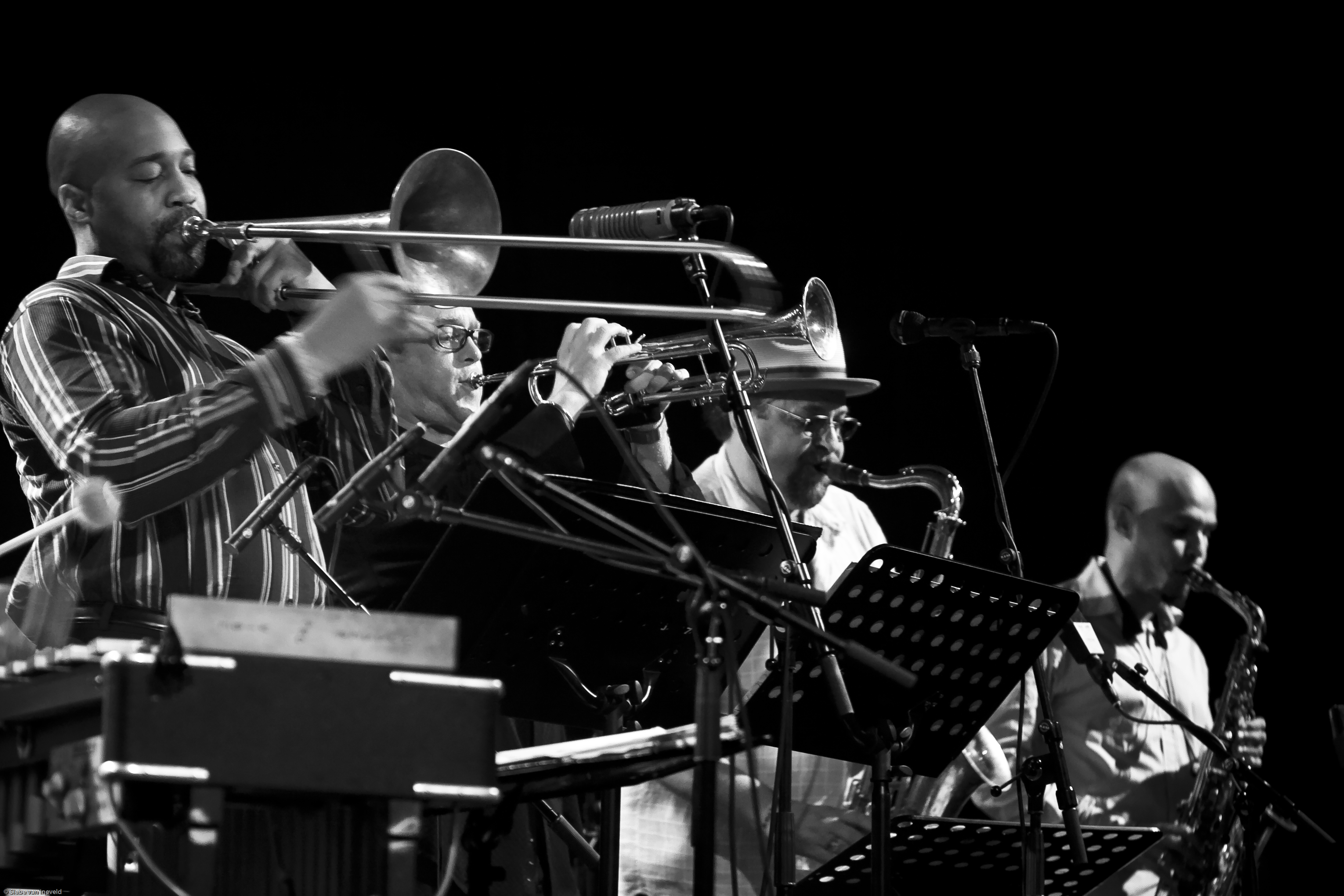
- The Collective at the North Sea Jazz Festival, Rotterdam, 2007. From left: Andre Hayward, Dave Douglas, Joe Lovano, and Miguel Zenón

Background information
- Origin: San Francisco, California, U.S.
- Genres: Jazz
- Years active: 2004–present
- Labels: SFJAZZ; Nonesuch
- Website: www.sfjazz.org

The SFJAZZ Collective is an American jazz ensemble comprising nine performer-composers, launched in 2004 by SFJAZZ, a West Coast non-profit jazz institution and the presenter of the annual San Francisco Jazz Festival.

== Collective activities ==
The SFJAZZ Collective performs new repertoire each year, one that balances the works of a great modern jazz composer from the post-1960 era and eight new compositions, commissioned by SFJAZZ, one from each band member. To date, the composers of focus have been Ornette Coleman (2004), John Coltrane (2005), Herbie Hancock (2006), Thelonious Monk (2007), Wayne Shorter (2008), McCoy Tyner (2009), Horace Silver (2010), Stevie Wonder (2011), Chick Corea (2012), Joe Henderson (2014), Michael Jackson (2015), Miles Davis (2016), Ornette Coleman, Stevie Wonder, Thelonious Monk (2017), and Antônio Carlos Jobim (2018). For its tenth anniversary tour in 2013, the SFJAZZ Collective performed compositions from the previous nine years.

The SFJAZZ Collective convenes in San Francisco each spring for a three-week residency. Throughout this rehearsal period, the octet workshops the season's new repertoire and interacts with the Bay Area community through SFJAZZ's education programs for youth and adults.

Following each year's season, SFJAZZ Records releases a limited-edition CD set.

== Members ==
As of the 2025–26 season:

- Chris Potter – music director, tenor and soprano saxophones
- David Sánchez – tenor saxophone
- Mike Rodriguez – trumpet
- Warren Wolf – vibraphone
- Edward Simon – piano
- Matt Brewer – bass
- Kendrick Scott – drums

=== Previous members ===
(List may be incomplete)

- Jeff Ballard – drums (2012–2013)
- Brian Blade – drums (2004)
- Obed Calvaire – drums (2013–2021)
- Etienne Charles – trumpet
- Avishai Cohen – trumpet (2009–2015)
- Dave Douglas – trumpet (2007–2009)
- Robin Eubanks – trombone (2008–2019)
- Eric Harland – drums (2005–2012)
- Stefon Harris – vibraphone, marimba (2007–2013)
- Andre Hayward – trombone (2006–2007)
- Robert Hurst – bass (2004)
- Bobby Hutcherson – vibraphone, marimba (2004–2007)
- Sean Jones – trumpet (2015–2017)
- Joe Lovano – tenor saxophone (2008–2009)
- Martin Luther McCoy – vocals
- Nicholas Payton – trumpet (2004–2006)
- Matt Penman – bass (2005–2017)
- Joshua Redman – tenor saxophone, musical director (2004–2007)
- Adam Rogers – guitar (2019–2021)
- Josh Roseman – trombone (2004)
- Renee Rosnes – piano (2004–2009)
- Isaac Smith – trombone (2004–2005)
- Mark Turner – tenor saxophone (2010–2012)
- Miguel Zenón – alto saxophone, flute (2004–2019)

== Discography ==
=== Albums ===
- Inaugural Season Live 2004 (SFJAZZ, 2004)[3CD]
- SFJAZZ Collective (Nonesuch, 2005) – live rec. 2004
- Live 2005: 2nd Annual Concert Tour – The Works of John Coltrane (SFJAZZ, 2005)[2CD]
- SFJAZZ Collective 2 (Nonesuch, 2006) – live rec. 2005
- Live 2006: 3rd Annual Concert Tour – The Music of Herbie Hancock (SFJAZZ, 2006)[2CD]
- Live 2007: 4th Annual Concert Tour – The Works of Thelonious Monk (SFJAZZ, 2007)[2CD]
- Live 2008: 5th Annual Concert Tour – The Works of Wayne Shorter (SFJAZZ, 2008)[3CD]
- Live 2009: 6th Annual Concert Tour – The Music of McCoy Tyner (SFJAZZ, 2009)[2CD]
- Live 2010: 7th Annual Concert Tour – The Works of Horace Silver (SFJAZZ, 2010)[3CD]
- Live in New York 2011 – Season 8 – The Music of Stevie Wonder (SFJAZZ, 2011)[3CD]
- Live: SFJAZZ Center 2013 – The Music of Chick Corea (SFJAZZ, 2013)[2CD]
- Live: SFJAZZ Center 2014 – The Music of Joe Henderson (SFJAZZ, 2014)[2CD]
- 10th Anniversary: Best of – Live at the SFJAZZ Center 2013 (SFJAZZ, 2014)
- Live: SFJAZZ Center 2015 – The Music of Michael Jackson (SFJAZZ, 2015)
- Live: SFJAZZ Center 2016 – The Music of Miles Davis (SFJAZZ, 2017)[2CD]
- Live: SFJAZZ Center 2017 – The Music of Ornette Coleman, Stevie Wonder, & Thelonious Monk (SFJAZZ, 2017)[2CD]
- Live: SFJAZZ Center 2018 – The Music of Antônio Carlos Jobim (SFJAZZ, 2019)[2CD]
- Live: SFJAZZ Center 2019 – Miles Davis 'In a Silent Way' and Sly & The Family Stone 'Stand!' (SFJAZZ, 2020)
- Live: SFJAZZ Center 2021 – New Works Reflecting The Moment (SFJAZZ, 2022)

=== Compilations ===
- Wonder – The Songs of Stevie Wonder (SFJAZZ, 2012)
- Miguel Zenón Retrospective: Original Compositions, 2004–2016 (SFJAZZ, 2018)
