= Miki Yamanaka =

Japanese jazz musician (born 1990)

Miki Yamanaka 山中 迪貴
- Miki Yamanaka, photographed at the Barnes Foundation in 2026.

Background information
- Born: 1990 (age 35–36); Kyoto
- Origin: Kobe, Japan
- Genre: Jazz
- Instruments: Piano, organ
- Spouse: Jimmy Macbride
- Education: Queens College
- Website: mikiyamanaka.com

Miki Yamanaka (Japanese: 山中 迪貴) (born 1990) is a Japanese jazz musician currently living in New York City.

Miki Yamanaka lived in Kyoto until she was 10, when she moved to Kobe. She became interested in jazz while playing in her junior high school big band. She moved to New York in 2012 and took a compositional residency at the Kennedy Center in 2015. In 2020, during the COVID-19 pandemic, she recorded the album Stairway to the Stars in her living room with Mark Turner and Orlando le Fleming. For her first gig after the pandemic, Yamanaka wore a kimono outfit to honor her mother; since then she has dressed in one every time she plays.

== Discography ==
=== As leader ===
- Miki (2018, Cellar Live)
- Human Dust Suite (2020, Outside In Music)
- Stairway to the Stars (2021, Outside In Music)
- Shades of Rainbow (2023, Cellar Music)
- Chance (2024, Cellar Music)

=== As guest ===
- Adi Meyerson - I Want To Sing My Heart Out in Praise of Life (2021, Independent)
