= Metheny/Mehldau Quartet =

Metheny Mehldau Quartet

Studio album by Pat Metheny, Brad Mehldau, Jeff Ballard, Larry Grenadier
- Released: March 13, 2007
- Recorded: December 2005
- Studio: Right Track, New York City
- Genre: Jazz
- Length: 73:14
- Label: Nonesuch
- Producer: Pat Metheny

Pat Metheny chronology
| Metheny Mehldau (2006) | Metheny Mehldau Quartet (2007) | Day Trip (2008) |

Brad Mehldau chronology
| Metheny Mehldau (2006) | Metheny Mehldau Quartet (2007) | Brad Mehldau Trio Live (2008) |

Professional ratings
Review scores
| Source | Rating |
|---|---|
| AllMusic | 4/5 stars |
| The Penguin Guide to Jazz | 3/4 stars |
| Tom Hull | B+ |

Metheny Mehldau Quartet is a jazz album by guitarist Pat Metheny and pianist Brad Mehldau, released in 2007 by Nonesuch Records. It features bassist Larry Grenadier and drummer Jeff Ballard.

== Background ==
An earlier disc from the pair, Metheny Mehldau, was released in 2006 and contains mostly duet recordings with the exception of two tracks. On this album, however, Mehldau's two trio men, Jeff Ballard and Larry Grenadier, are much more present, hence the title of the album.

The tracks on Metheny Mehldau Quartet come from the same December 2005 recording sessions between Pat Metheny and Brad Mehldau that produced Metheny Mehldau.

== Track listing ==
All tracks are written by Pat Metheny except where noted.

| No. | Title | Writer(s) | Length |
|---|---|---|---|
| 1. | "A Night Away" | Metheny, Mehldau | 7:59 |
| 2. | "The Sound of Water" | | 3:53 |
| 3. | "Fear and Trembling" | Mehldau | 6:56 |
| 4. | "Don't Wait" | | 7:08 |
| 5. | "Towards the Light" | | 8:10 |
| 6. | "Long Before" | | 6:57 |
| 7. | "En La Tierra Que No Olvida" | | 7:43 |
| 8. | "Santa Cruz Slacker" | Mehldau | 6:09 |
| 9. | "Secret Beach" | Mehldau | 9:07 |
| 10. | "Silent Movie" | | 6:03 |
| 11. | "Marta's Theme" (from "Passaggio per il Paradiso") | | 2:31 |
| Total length: | | | 73:14 |

== Personnel ==
- Pat Metheny – guitar, 42-string Pikasso guitar (track 2), acoustic guitar (track 4), guitar synthesizer (tracks 5 and 9)
- Brad Mehldau – piano
- Larry Grenadier – double bass
- Jeff Ballard – drums

Note

- Tracks 2, 4, 6, and 11 are Metheny and Mehldau duets.

=== Technical personnel ===
- Pat Metheny – producer
- Robert Hurwitz – executive Producer
- Pete Karam – recording
- Rob Eaton – mixing
- Ted Jensen – mastering at Sterling Sound, NYC, USA
- Doyle Partners – design
- Arild Danielsen – cover photograph
