= MTB =

MTB may refer to:

== Science and medicine ==
- Magnetotactic bacteria
- Mediterranean tamarisk beetle
- Multilobular tumour of bone, canine disease
- Mycobacterium tuberculosis

== Transport and vehicles ==
- Matlock Bath railway station, England; National Rail station code MTB
- Mississauga Truck and Bus Collision, a Canadian bus manufacturer
- Motor torpedo boat
- Mountain bike

== Other uses ==
- M&T Bank of New York, NYSE symbol
- Magandang Tanghali Bayan, a variety show in the Philippines
- The Marshall Tucker Band, a band from Spartanburg, South Carolina, United States
- Minus the Bear, a band from Seattle, Washington, United States
- Mutual Trust Bank, a bank in Bangladesh
- My Therapy Buddy, a talking plush doll for adults
