= Anke Helfrich =

German jazz pianist and composer (born 1966)

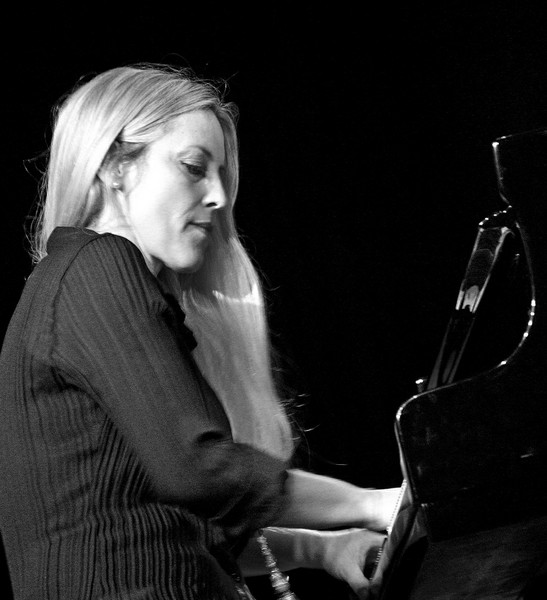
- Anke Helfrich at Jazzfestival St. Ingbert in 2007

Background information
- Born: November 11, 1966 (age 58)
- Genres: Jazz
- Occupation: Musician
- Instrument: Piano
- Labels: Enja

Anke Helfrich (born 11 November 1966) is a German jazz pianist and composer.

== Life and work ==
Helfrich grew up in Windhoek, Namibia and Weinheim, Germany where she received piano lessons. She studied in the Netherlands at the Amsterdamse Hoogeschool for the Arts and in New York, where she had lessons with Kenny Barron and Larry Goldings.

In 1996 Helfrich formed a trio with John Weidenmüller and Jochen Rückert, releasing her first album You'll See in 2000 with guest Mark Turner. From 2002, she toured as a trio with Martin Gjakonovski and Dejan Terzic (jazz drummer).

Since 1999 she has lectured at the University of Music and Performing Arts in Mannheim, and since 2011 at the Hoch Conservatory in Frankfurt.

In 2006 her CD Better Times Ahead was nominated for the German Record Critics' Quarterly Prize. In 2016 she received the ECHO Jazz in the category "National Instrumentalist of the Year - Piano/Keyboards". In 2017 she was awarded the Hessian Jazz Prize.

== Discography ==
- Christian Eckert Quartet - Musing (1995)
- Jens Bunge - With All My Heart (1996)
- Anke Helfrich Trio ft. Mark Turner - You'll See (2000)
- Witchcraft ft. Stacy Rowles and Carolyn Breuer - Witchcraft Live (2004)
- Barbara Bridesmaid - Berlin Spirits (2004)
- Anke Helfrich Trio ft. Roy Hargrove - Better Times Ahead (2006)
- Anke Helfrich Trio ft. Nils Wogram - Stormproof (2009)
- Anke Helfrich Trio ft. Tim Hagens - Dedication (2015)
