= Long Ago and Far Away (Charlie Haden and Brad Mehldau album) =

Live album by Charlie Haden, Brad Mehldau
- Released: October 2018
- Recorded: November 5, 2007
- Venue: Christuskirche (Mannheim, Germany)
- Length: 71:49
- Label: Impulse!

Charlie Haden chronology
Time/Life (2016)	Long Ago and Far Away (2018)	Live At The Village Vanguard - Unissued Tracks (2022)

Brad Mehldau chronology
Live in Marciac (2006)	Long Ago and Far Away (2007)	Highway Rider (2009)

Long Ago and Far Away is a duo album by Charlie Haden and Brad Mehldau. It was recorded in 2007 and released by Impulse! Records in 2018.

== Music and recording ==
The music is from a 2007 concert at the Enjoy Jazz Festival in Mannheim, Germany. The material is standards. On "Au Privave", after the theme is stated, "a change of key signals a narrative switch to flurries of notes, trills and single note lines. Haden, unhurried, shifts harmonic focus underneath until the theme returns, pulled into fragments that lean back on the beat."

== Release and reception ==
Professional ratings
Review scores
Source	Rating
AllMusic	4/5 stars
Financial Times	4/5 stars
Jazz Forum	5/5 stars
Jazzwise	4/5 stars

The album was released by Impulse! Records in 2018. The AllMusic reviewer commented on the "casual intensity, and the willingness to commune with yearning lyricism one minute and dive into dark voids the next, that make Mehldau and Haden's duo work here so compelling."

== Track listing ==
1. "Au Privave" - 9:55
2. "My Old Flame" - 9.13
3. "What'll I Do" - 12:00
4. "Long Ago and Far Away" - 15:05
5. "My Love and I" - 12:59
6. "Everything Happens to Me" - 12.37

== Personnel ==
- Charlie Haden – bass
- Brad Mehldau – piano
