= In This World (Mark Turner album) =

Studio album by Mark Turner
- Released: September 1998
- Recorded: June 1998
- Genre: Jazz
- Label: Warner Bros.

Mark Turner chronology
| Mark Turner (1998) | In This World (1998) | Two Tenor Ballads (2000) |

Professional ratings
Review scores
| Source | Rating |
|---|---|
| AllMusic | 4/5 stars |
| The Penguin Guide to Jazz | 4/4 stars |

In This World is an album by saxophonist Mark Turner.

== Background ==
This was Turner's second album for Warner Bros. Records.

== Music and recording ==
The album was recorded in June 1998. It contains six originals and three covers. "Mesa" "meanders from a relaxed melodic path to a switch-back road of surprises." Brad Mehldau plays electric piano instead of piano on three tracks. Two drummers – Brian Blade and Jorge Rossy – play together on two tracks. Guitarist Kurt Rosenwinkel plays on three tracks.

== Track listing ==
1. "Mesa" – 7:33
2. "Lennie Groove" – 7:18
3. "You Know I Care" – 8:02
4. "The Long Road" – 6:48
5. "Barcelona" – 6:45
6. "In This World" – 7:56
7. "Days of Wine and Roses" – 5:02
8. "Bo Brussels" – 4:45
9. "She Said, She Said" – 6:13

== Personnel ==
- Mark Turner – tenor saxophone
- Brad Mehldau – piano, electric piano
- Kurt Rosenwinkel – guitar
- Larry Grenadier – bass
- Brian Blade – drums
- Jorge Rossy – drums
