= The Language of Music =

1960 book by Deryck Cooke

- Cover of the 1960 Oxford University Press edition
- Author: Deryck Cooke
- Language: English
- Subject: Music
- Published: 1959
- Publication place: United Kingdom
- Media type: Print (Hardcover and Paperback)
- Pages: 304 (1990 Clarendon Press edition)
- ISBN: 978-0198161806

The Language of Music is a 1959 book about music by the critic and musician Deryck Cooke.

== Reception ==
Robert M. Wallace reviewed The Language of Music in The Nation.

The Language of Music is an often cited representative of the expressionist theory of art. No systematic experimental study of Cooke's theory has emerged relating it to musical education, but one pilot study showed that for 22 non-musician students, his characterizations of musical phrases were not experienced. The philosopher Douglas Hofstadter writes that The Language of Music is, "A valuable start down what is sure to be a long hard road to understanding music and the human mind."
