= Multilobular tumour of bone =

Tumour of the Canine skull

The multilobular tumour of bone (MTB), also called an osteochondrosarcoma, is the most common tumour of the canine skull, although it is relatively rare in general.

MTB usually presents as a firm, circumscribed and generally slowgrowing bone tumour in older dogs from medium or large breeds. Its biological behaviour may range from benign to malignant, as it has the potential to invade, metastasise and recur. Histologically, it is characterised by the dominant presence of multiple osteoid- or cartilage- containing lobules that are separated by fibrous septae. MTB should be differentiated from other bone tumours. Although most frequently found in dogs, MTB has been reported in humans, cats, a horse and a ferret. The clinical signs depend on the tumour location. Depending on its location and stage in the clinical course, surgical resection may result in long-term remission.
