= Deryck Cooke =

British musician, musicologist and broadcaster

Deryck Cooke (14 September 1919 – 26 October 1976) was a British musician, musicologist, broadcaster and Gustav Mahler expert.

== Life ==
Cooke was born in Leicester to a poor, working-class family; his father died when he was a child, but his mother was able to afford piano lessons. Cooke acquired a brilliant technique and began to compose. From Wyggeston Grammar School for Boys he won an organ scholarship to Selwyn College, Cambridge, where he was taught by Patrick Hadley and Robin Orr. His undergraduate studies were interrupted by the Second World War, during which he served in the Royal Artillery and took part in the invasion of Italy. Towards the end of the war he became pianist in an army dance band.

Back in Cambridge, a number of his compositions were successfully performed, but he was insecure about their unfashionably conservative idiom, and eventually destroyed most of his works. After graduating in 1947 Cooke joined the BBC; apart from an interlude (1959–65) working as a freelance writer and critic, he worked for the corporation for the remainder of his life. His job involved writing and editing scripts for the music department and broadcasting for radio and television, where his thoughtful, unaffected manner made him an ideal communicator. In 1959 his first book, The Language of Music, argued that music is essentially a language of the emotions, and showed that composers throughout history had tended to choose the same musical phrases to express similar feelings or dramatic situations.

Beginning in the run-up to the Mahler centenary in 1960, Cooke (in association with Berthold Goldschmidt) made his first attempt at producing a 'performing version' of the unfinished draft of Mahler's 10th Symphony. Originally a lecture demonstration broadcast by the BBC in 1960, the first full (continuous) version was premièred on 13 August 1964 at the Proms by the London Symphony Orchestra under the baton of Goldschmidt. Revised editions followed, with the composers David Matthews and Colin Matthews assisting Cooke and Goldschmidt in the attempt to produce an authentically Mahlerian orchestration. Finally seen into print by Cooke and his collaborators in 1976, the work has now become a part of the repertoire.

Cooke's last years were marred by ill health, and he died prematurely of a cerebral haemorrhage in 1976, at the age of 57. During the final years of his life he had worked on a large-scale study of Wagner's massive operatic tetralogy Der Ring des Nibelungen. However, only part of the first volume, dealing with the text, was finished; it was published after his death as I Saw the World End. A collection of Cooke's essays and talks was also published after his death as Vindications. Cooke's archive is held at Cambridge University Library (CUL MS Cooke & MS Add 10045).

== Books ==
- The Language of Music, OUP (1959)
- Gustav Mahler (1860–1911): A Companion to the BBC's Celebrations of the Centenary of his Birth (BBC, 1960); republished in an edition revised and expanded by Colin and David Matthews (Faber, 1980; CUP, 1988).
- Ed. Deryck Cooke: Thematic Patterns in Sonatas of Beethoven, by Rudolph Reti (London, Faber, 1967)
- I Saw the World End: A Study of Wagner's Ring at Google Books (incomplete; text published by Clarendon Press, Oxford, 1979)
- Vindications: Essays on Romantic Music (posthumous collection of essays and broadcast scripts), Faber, 1982; reprinted 2008

== Recordings ==
- An Introduction to Richard Wagner's "Der Ring des Nibelungen" (audio, with extracts from the Solti version and some specially recorded demonstrations). Recorded 1967; released on LP 1968; re-packaged and re-released 1969; remastered and re-released on CD 1995. Transcript of Cooke's Introduction.

== Articles by Cooke ==
- 'Ernest Newman (1868–1959)', Tempo, No.52, Autumn 1959, 2–3
- 'Anton Bruckner', in R. Simpson (ed.), The Symphony, Vol.1: Haydn to Dvořák (Harmondsworth, 1966).
- 'The Measure of Mahler', The Listener, 7 December 1967, 761.
- 'The Bruckner Problem Simplified', Musical Times, Vol.CX, 20–22 (Jan '69), 142–4 (Feb '69), 362–5 (Apr '69), 479–482 (May '69); reprinted in a revised version (1975) as a booklet by 'The Musical Newsletter' in association with Novello & Co. Ltd; revised version reprinted in Vindications: Essays on Romantic Music (Faber and Faber, London, 1982).
- 'The Language of Mahler: David Holbrook's Interpretation', in Musical Times, November 1976, 899.
- 'Bruckner, (Joseph) Anton', in S. Sadie (ed.), The New Grove Dictionary of Music and Musicians, iii, 352; reprinted in S. Sadie (ed.), Late Romantic Masters: Bruckner, Brahms, Dvořák (London, 1985).

== Bibliography ==
- Victor Zuckerkandl: Review of The Language of Music, in Journal of Music Theory, Vol.IV(1) (1960), 104–109.
