= Larry Grenadier =

American jazz double bassist (born 1966)

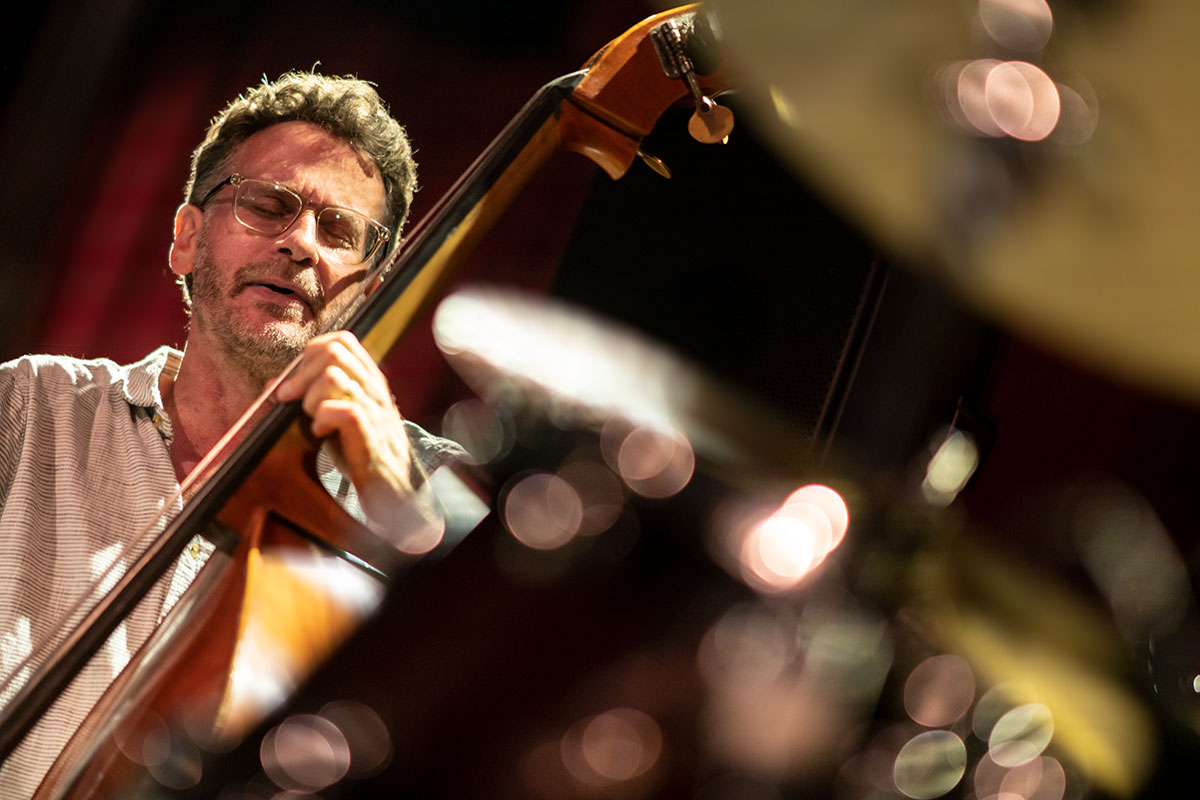
- Grenadier in Aarhus, Denmark, 2022

Background information
- Born: February 6, 1966 (age 60); San Francisco, California, U.S.
- Genre: Jazz
- Occupation: Musician
- Instrument: Double bass
- Years active: 1980s–present
- Label: ECM
- Formerly of: Fly; Hudson
- Spouse: Rebecca Martin (m. 1997)
- Education: Stanford University (BA)
- Website: larrygrenadier.com

Larry Grenadier (born February 6, 1966, in San Francisco) is an American jazz double bassist.

== Early life ==
Grenadier's father was a trumpeter in World War II army bands and later in Europe but stopped playing professionally before his children were born. Grenadier began on trumpet when he was in fifth grade, before beginning to play the bass the following year. Grenadier's brothers played trumpet and guitar. Grenadier's father helped introduce him to the instruments and music theory. Larry's older brother Phil began listening to jazz around this time, influencing his sibling's musical interests. Grenadier began listening to several jazz bassists, including Ray Brown, Charles Mingus, Richard Davis, Paul Chambers, Wilbur Ware, and Oscar Pettiford, among others.

At age 12, Grenadier began formal study of the acoustic bass, learning from local jazz bass players Chris Poehlor, Paul Breslin, and Frank Tusa, and later, classical bassists Michael Burr and Stephen Tramontozzi. By age 16, Grenadier had a busy career performing in the San Francisco Bay Area with both local musicians and those traveling through town in need of a bassist. During this period, he played with Harvey Wainapel, Bobby Hutcherson, Joe Henderson, Larry Vuckovich, Eddie Henderson, Bruce Forman, Eddie Marshall, Vince Lateano, George Cables, Donald Bailey, Toots Thielemans, Johnny Griffin, Charles McPherson, and Frank Morgan, among others.

Grenadier studied at Stanford University and graduated in 1989 with a bachelor's degree in English Literature. At Stanford, he met Stan Getz, with whom he toured.

== Career ==
Grenadier with Fly in 2010

After graduating from Stanford, Grenadier moved to Boston to play with vibraphonist Gary Burton. In 1991, he moved to New York. He continued to collaborate with some of the musicians he had met during his time in Boston, such as Kurt Rosenwinkel, Joshua Redman, Mark Turner, Jorge Rossy, and Chris Cheek. Others he met for the first time in New York include Bill Stewart, Kevin Hays, Renee Rosnes, Ralph Moore, Billy Drummond, Danilo Pérez, David Sánchez, Tom Harrell, and Billy Hart. Grenadier continued his association with Joe Henderson, touring with his band, which at times included Al Foster, Renee Rosnes, and Larry Willis. He also spent a few months during his earlier years in New York playing in Betty Carter's band.

In the early 1990s, Grenadier first met and performed with pianist Brad Mehldau. He joined Mehldau's trio alongside drummer Jorge Rossy; together, they toured and recorded for over ten years. Rossy was replaced by drummer Jeff Ballard in 2004.

Grenadier has also worked with guitarist Pat Metheny, with whom he toured as a trio along with drummer Bill Stewart. He credits his experiences touring with Metheny's trio as a significant learning experience.

Grenadier has also played with John Scofield, Hudson (a collaborative project with Jack DeJohnette, John Medeski, and Scofield), Charles Lloyd, Chris Potter, Billy Higgins, Michael Brecker, and Paul Motian, among many others. In 2014, Grenadier collaborated with Stefano Bollani on the album Sheik yer Zappa.

Grenadier is a member of Fly, a jazz trio that includes tenor saxophonist Mark Turner and drummer Jeff Ballard. They have recorded three critically acclaimed albums. He also tours and records with his wife, singer-songwriter Rebecca Martin. A landmark solo bass album of his, The Gleaners, was issued on ECM Records in 2019.

== Personal ==
Grenadier married singer-songwriter Rebecca Martin on June 7, 1997. Grenadier and Martin live in Hudson Valley, New York. Together, they have one son, Charlie.

== Selected discography ==
=== As leader ===
- The Gleaners (ECM, 2019)

=== As member ===
Fly

(With Mark Turner and Jeff Ballard)

- Fly (Savoy, 2004)
- Sky & Country (ECM, 2009)
- Year of the Snake (ECM, 2012)

Hudson

(With Jack DeJohnette, John Medeski, and John Scofield)

- Hudson (Motéma, 2013)

=== As sideman ===
With BeatleJazz

- With a Little Help From Our Friends (Lightyear, 2005)
- All You Need is Love (Lightyear, 2007)

With Peter Beets

- New York Trio – Page Two (Criss Cross, 2002)

With Peter Bernstein

- Heart's Content (Criss Cross, 2002)
- Stranger in Paradise (Venus, 2004)

With Seamus Blake

- The Call (Criss Cross, 1993)
- Four Track Mind (Criss Cross, 1994)

With Chris Cheek

- Blues Cruise (Fresh Sound, 2005)

With George Colligan

- The Endless Mysteries (Origin, 2013)

With Jon Gordon

- Ask Me Now (Criss Cross, 1994)
- Currents (Double-Time, 1998)

With Phil Grenadier

- Sweet Transients (Fresh Sound, 2000)
- Playful Intentions (Fresh Sound, 2002)

With Kevin Hays

- Ugly Beauty (SteepleChase, 1991)

With Ethan Iverson

- Costumes Are Mandatory (HighNote, 2013)
- Every Note Is True (Blue Note, 2022)

With David Kikoski

- Details (Criss Cross, 2003)
- Limits (Criss Cross, 2005)

With Jonathan Kreisberg

- Nine Stories Wide (Criss Cross, 2003)

With Charles Lloyd

- The Water Is Wide (ECM, 1999)
- Hyperion with Higgins (ECM, 1999)
- Lift Every Voice (ECM, 2002)
- The Sky Will Still Be There Tomorrow (Blue Note, 2024)

With Herbie Mann

- America/Brasil (Lightyear, 1995)
- Celebration (Lightyear, 1995)

With Rebecca Martin

- Thoroughfare (Sunnyside, 1998)
- Middlehope (Fresh Sound, 2000)
- The Growing Season (Sunnyside, 2008)
- When I Was Long Ago (Sunnyside, 2010)
- Twain (Sunnyside, 2013)
- The Upstate Project (Sunnyside, 2017)
- After Midnight (Core Port, 2022) with Orquestra Jazz de Matosinhos

With Brad Mehldau

- Introducing Brad Mehldau (Warner Bros., 1995)
- The Art of the Trio Volume One (Warner Bros., 1997)
- Live at the Village Vanguard: The Art of the Trio Volume Two (Warner Bros., 1998)
- Songs: The Art of the Trio Volume Three (Warner Bros., 1998)
- Art of the Trio 4: Back at the Vanguard (Warner Bros., 1999)
- Places (Warner Bros., 2000)
- Progression: The Art of the Trio, Vol. 5 (Warner Bros., 2001)
- Largo (Warner Bros., 2002)
- Anything Goes (Warner Bros., 2004)
- Day Is Done (Nonesuch, 2005)
- House on Hill (Nonesuch, 2006)
- Brad Mehldau Trio Live (Nonesuch, 2008)
- Highway Rider (Nonesuch, 2009)
- Ode (Nonesuch, 2012)
- Where Do You Start (Nonesuch, 2012)
- Blues and Ballads (Nonesuch, 2016)
- Seymour Reads the Constitution! (Nonesuch, 2018)

With Pat Metheny

- Trio 99 → 00 (Warner Bros., 2000)
- Trio → Live (Warner Bros., 2000)
- Metheny/Mehldau (Nonesuch, 2006)
- Metheny/Mehldau Quartet (Nonesuch, 2007)

With Paul Motian

- Trio 2000 + One (Winter & Winter, 1997)
- On Broadway Vol. 4 or The Paradox of Continuity (Winter & Winter, 2005)
- Live at the Village Vanguard (Winter & Winter, 2006)
- Live at the Village Vanguard Vol. II (Winter & Winter, 2006)
- Live at the Village Vanguard Vol. III (Winter & Winter, 2006)

With MTB

(Brad Mehldau, Mark Turner, and Peter Bernstein)

- Consenting Adults (Criss Cross, 1994)
- Solid Jackson (Criss Cross, 2023)

With Wolfgang Muthspiel

- Rising Grace (ECM, 2016)
- Where the River Goes (ECM, 2018)

With Chris Potter

- Pure (Concord, 1994)
- Moving In (Concord, 1996)
- The Sirens (ECM, 2013) with Craig Taborn, David Virelles, and Eric Harland

With Enrico Rava

- New York Days (ECM, 2008)

With Joshua Redman

- Timeless Tales (Warner Bros., 1998)
- Back East (Nonesuch, 2007)
- Compass (Nonesuch, 2009)
- Walking Shadows (Nonesuch, 2013)

With Kurt Rosenwinkel

- Deep Song (Verve, 2005)

With Jamie Saft

- Borscht Belt Studies (Tzadik, 2011)
- Fight Against Babylon (Veal, 2011) – as the New Zion Trio

With David Sánchez

- Sketches of Dreams (Columbia, 1994)

With Stan Sulzmann

- The Jigsaw (Basho, 2004)

With Mark Turner

- Two Tenor Ballads (Criss Cross Jazz, 1994 [2000]) with Tad Shull
- Yam Yam (Criss Cross, 1994)
- In This World (Warner Bros., 1998)

With Scott Wendholt

- From Now On (Criss Cross, 1995)

With Frank Wess and Johnny Coles

- Two at the Top (Uptown, 1988 [2012])

With Steve Wilson

- Four for Time (Criss Cross, 1994)

With Chihiro Yamanaka

- When October Goes (Atelier Sawano, 2002)
- Madrigal (Atelier Sawano, 2004)
- Lach Doch Mal (Verve, 2006)
- Reminiscence (Verve, 2011)
