= John McNeil (musician) =

American jazz trumpeter (1948–2024)

- Born: John Patrick McNeil; March 23, 1948; Siskiyou County, California, U.S.
- Died: September 27, 2024 (aged 76)
- Genres: Jazz
- Occupation: Musician
- Instrument: Trumpet
- Website: www.mcneiljazz.com

John Patrick McNeil (March 23, 1948 – September 27, 2024) was an American jazz trumpeter. He performed with artists including Billy Hart, Rufus Reid, Horace Silver, Gerry Mulligan, and The Thad Jones/Mel Lewis Orchestra. McNeil was born on March 23, 1948, and died on September 27, 2024, at the age of 76.

== Discography ==
Artist	Title	Label	Year
John McNeil	There Is No Greater Love	Steeplechase	2026
John McNeil and Mike Fahie	Plainsong	Destiny	2017
John McNeil and Bill McHenry	Chill Morn He Climb Jenny	Sunnyside	2010
John McNeil and Bill McHenry	Rediscovery	Sunnyside	2008
John McNeil	East Coast Cool	Omnitone	2006
John McNeil	Sleep Won't Come	Omnitone	2004
John McNeil	This Way Out	Omnitone	2003
John McNeil	Fortuity	Steeplechase	2001
John McNeil	Brooklyn Ritual	Synergy	1998
John McNeil	Hip Deep	Brownstone	1996
John McNeil	I've Got the World on a String	Steeplechase	1983
John McNeil	Things We Did Last Summer	Steeplechase	1983
John McNeil	Faun	Steeplechase	1981
John McNeil	Clean Sweep	Steeplechase	1981
John McNeil	The Glass Room	Steeplechase	1979
John McNeil	Look to the Sky	Steeplechase	1979
John McNeil	Embarkation	Steeplechase	1978
