= Jeff Ballard (musician) =

American jazz drummer (born 1963)

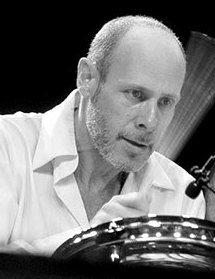
- Ballard in 2014

Background information
- Born: September 17, 1963 (age 63); Near Santa Cruz, California, U.S.
- Genre: Jazz
- Occupation: Musician
- Instruments: Drums; percussion
- Labels: OKeh; Edition
- Formerly of: Brad Mehldau Trio; Fly
- Education: Cabrillo College
- Website: www.jeffballard.com

Jeff Ballard (born September 17, 1963) is an American jazz drummer. He has performed with Ray Charles and Pat Metheny, and periodically with Chick Corea, in groups such as Origin and the Chick Corea New Trio. He also played with many New York–based jazz musicians, such as Reid Anderson, Brad Mehldau, Kurt Rosenwinkel, Mark Turner, Miguel Zenón, and Eli Degibri, as well as with the Joshua Redman Elastic Band.

He has been a member of the Brad Mehldau Trio since 2005, a co-leader of Fly (a collective trio with Mark Turner and Larry Grenadier), and leads the Jeff Ballard Trio and Jeff Ballard Fairgrounds.

== Biography ==
The Fly trio in 2010; from left: Mark Turner, Larry Grenadier, and Ballard

Ballard was born September 17, 1963, in Southern California but grew up and studied in Santa Cruz, California. He began playing the drums at age 14; attended Cabrillo College, where he studied music theory; and toured with many bands, all the time while absorbing influences and developing his own approach to drumming. He met Larry Grenadier in 1982, with whom he plays in both Fly and Brad Mehldau's trio. At the age of 24, he went on the road with Ray Charles for eight months each year from 1988 to 1990, playing in Charles's big band.

He moved to New York in 1990, where he began collaborating with Ben Monder, Kurt Rosenwinkel, Mark Turner, and Ben Allison. Later on in New York, he joined with the bassist Avishai Cohen and Chick Corea. Ballard formed the Fly trio with Larry Grenadier and Mark Turner around the time he was working with Corea. During a performance with Fly in New York City in 2005, Brad Mehldau was invited to sit in, which led to Mehldau inviting Ballard to join his own trio, subbing for Jorge Rossy, who for some time had been planning on moving back to Spain to focus on his piano playing. Ballard formed another trio with Lionel Loueke and Miguel Zenón, releasing Time's Tales (OKeh, 2014) – his recording debut as leader. His second album as leader, Fairgrounds (Edition, 2019), was with Loueke, Kevin Hays, and Reid Anderson, with guest appearances from Mark Turner and Chris Cheek.

== Awards ==
- Best Debut Album, 2014 NPR Music Jazz Critics Poll: Time's Tales
- Best Instrumentalist / International Drums/Percussion, Echo Jazz Awards 2015: Time's Tales

== Discography ==
=== As leader ===
- Jeff Ballard Trio, Time's Tales (OKeh, 2013) with Lionel Loueke, Miguel Zenón
- Fairgrounds (Edition, 2019) – live; rec. 2015

=== As a member ===
Fly
With Mark Turner and Larry Grenadier

- 2003: Fly (Savoy, 2004)
- 2008: Sky & Country (ECM, 2009)
- 2011: Year of the Snake (ECM, 2012)

SFJAZZ Collective

- Live: SFJAZZ Center 2013 – The Music of Chick Corea (SFJAZZ, 2013)[2CD]

=== As sideman ===
With Avishai Cohen

- Adama (Stretch, 1998) – rec. 1997
- Devotion (Stretch, 1999)
- Colors (Stretch, 2000)

With Chick Corea

- Change (Rykodisc, 1999)
- Corea.Concerto: Spain For Sextet & Orchestra / Piano Concerto No.1 (Sony Classical, 2000)
- Past, Present & Future (Stretch, 2001)
- Rendezvous in New York (Stretch, 2003) – live
- 5trios – 3. Chillin' in Chelan (Stretch, 2007)

With Brad Mehldau

- Day Is Done (Nonesuch, 2005)
- Metheny/Mehldau (Nonesuch, 2006)
- Metheny/Mehldau Quartet (Nonesuch, 2007)
- Brad Mehldau Trio Live (Nonesuch, 2008)
- Highway Rider (Nonesuch, 2010)
- Ode (Nonesuch, 2012) – rec. 2011
- Where Do You Start (Nonesuch, 2012) – rec. 2008–2011
- Blues and Ballads (Nonesuch, 2016) – rec. 2012–2014
- Seymour Reads the Constitution! (Nonesuch, 2018)

With Pat Metheny

- Metheny/Mehldau (Nonesuch, 2006) – rec. 2005
- Metheny/Mehldau Quartet (Nonesuch, 2007) – rec. 2005

With Kurt Rosenwinkel

- The Enemies of Energy (Verve, 2000) – rec. 1996
- The Next Step (Verve, 2001) – rec. 2000
- Heartcore (Verve, 2003) – rec. 2001–2003
- Deep Song (Verve, 2005)

With others

- Ted Nash, Sidewalk Meeting (Arabesque, 2001) – rec. 2000
- The Herbie Nichols Project, Love Is Proximity (Soul Note, 1996)
- Joshua Redman, Momentum (Verve, 2005)
- Chihiro Yamanaka, Madrigal (Atelier Sawano, 2004)
