= Eric Ineke =

Dutch jazz drummer (born 1947)

Eric Alexander Ineke
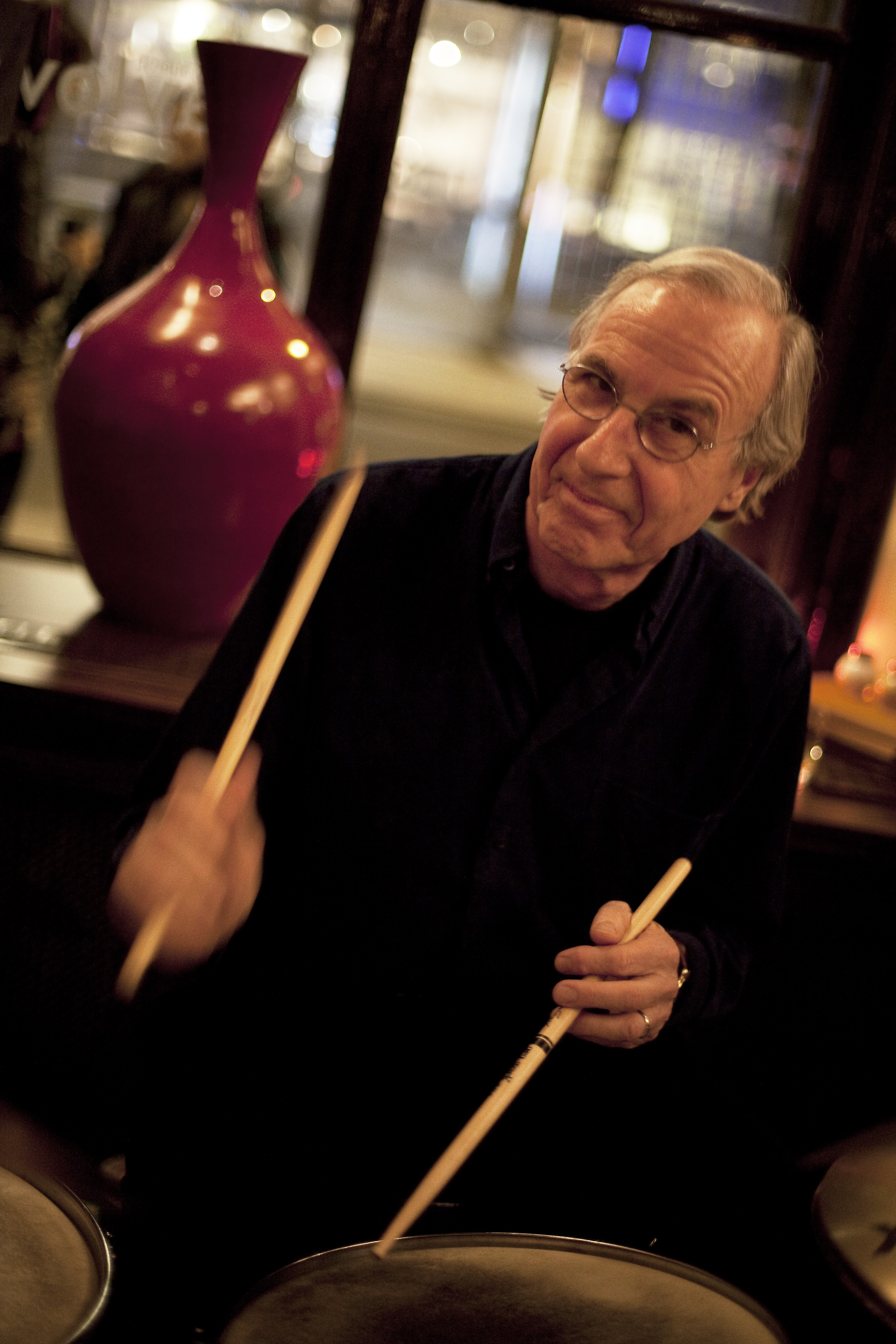
- Photo of Eric Ineke taken by Marc Heeman

Background information
- Born: Eric Alexander Ineke; April 1, 1947; Haarlem, The Netherlands
- Genres: Jazz, bebop, hard bop, post-bop
- Occupations: Drummer, Bandleader, educator
- Instrument: Drums
- Years active: 1964 – present
- Website: www.ericineke.com

Eric Ineke (born Haarlem, April 1, 1947) is a Dutch jazz drummer who started his career in the 1960s. After a few years of lessons of John Engels, he gained his first experience as a jazz drummer with singer Henny Vonk and tenorsaxophonist Ferdinand Povel. Thanks to Pim Jacobs, Ruud Jacobs, Wim Overgaauw, Rita Reys and Piet Noordijk, Eric became well known in the jazz scene. In 1969 he made his first record with tenor saxophonist Ferdinand Povel and through the years he has played with the Rob Agerbeek Quintet and trio, the Rein de Graaff/Dick Vennik Quartet, the Ben van den Dungen/Jarmo Hoogendijk Quintet and the Piet Noordijk Quartet. During his career he has also played with numerous international, mainly American soloists like Hank Mobley, Phil Woods, Lucky Thompson, Dexter Gordon, Johnny Griffin, George Coleman, Shirley Horn, Dizzy Gillespie, Al Cohn, Grant Stewart, Jimmy Raney, Barry Harris, Eric Alexander and Dave Liebman, recorded numerous CD's and appeared at many national and international jazz festivals (North Sea Jazz Festival, Nice Jazz Festival, Pescara Jazz, San Remo, Athens, Toronto Jazz Festival, Montreal International Jazz Festival and New York). For more than 40 years he has been the drummer of the Rein de Graaff Trio and since 2006 has led the Eric Ineke JazzXpress, a quintet in the hard-bop tradition. With this quintet, Ineke was invited in 2011 by the American Jazz Museum in Kansas City with jazz singer Deborah Brown where they did a few performances, including one on Kansas Public Radio and a CD recording produced by Bobby Watson. In October 2016, the JazzXpress presented its latest album Dexternity on the Dutch television in "Vrije Geluiden" of the VPRO.

Ineke also teaches at the Royal Conservatory of The Hague. Ineke is giving masterclasses all around the world. In April 2012 he released his first book The Ultimate Sideman, in conversation with Dave Liebman.

On April 1, 2017, Ineke turned seventy and celebrated this with a ‘Eric Ineke 70 Super Jam’ in the Bimhuis, Amsterdam. During the first half of the concert, Female Deputy Mayor of the Amsterdam city council Simone Kukenheim honored Ineke with a Knightage in the ‘Orde van Oranje Nassau’ for his unbridled dedication to the Dutch Jazz scene.

== Discography ==
=== As leader ===
- The Eric Ineke JazzXpress
  - Flames’n’Fire, 2006, Daybreak/Challenge Records (1994)
  - For The Love Of Ivie – with Deborah Brown, 2007, Daybreak/Challenge Records (1994), (Edison Award Nomination)
  - Xpressions In Time, 2008, Daybreak/Challenge Records (1994)
  - JazzXL, Blues, Ballads and Other Bright Moments, 2009, Daybreak/Challenge Records (1994)
  - Cruisin', 2014, Daybreak/Challenge Records (1994)
  - Dexternity, The Music of Dexter Gordon, 2016, Daybreak/Challenge Records (1994), (Edison Award Nomination)
  - What Kinda Bird Is This?, The Music of Charlie Parker, 2020, A&R Challenge Records (1994), (Edison Award Nomination)
  - 75 years - Swinging, Boppin' and Burnin' , 2022, Ultra Vybe
  - Swing Street - The Music of Cannonball Adderley feat. Tineke Postma, 2024, Timeless Records
- Eric Ineke Meets The Tenor players,
  - Let There Be Life Love and Laughter, 2017, Daybreak/Challenge Records (1994), (Edison Award Nomination)

=== As co-leader ===
- The Wolfert Brederode/Eric Ineke Quintet
  - Trinity, 1999, A-Records/Challenge Records (1994)
  - Pictures of You, 2001, A-Records/Challenge Records (1994)
- Dave Liebman/Ineke/Laginha/Pinheiro/Cavalli Quintet
  - Is Seeing Believing?, 2016, Daybreak/Challenge Records (1994)
- Pinheiro/Ineke/Cavalli Trio
  - Triplicity, 2018, Daybreak/Challenge Records (1994)
  - The Music of Bill Evans, 2019, Challenge Records (1994)
- Pekka Pylkkanen/Eric Ineke with Mikael Jakobsson and Heikko Remmel
  - Nordic Bop, 2022, Challenge Records (1994)

=== As sideman ===
- With Deborah Brown
  - All Too Soon – with The Eric Ineke Jazzxpress/Bobby Watson, 2011, CD.Baby.com
  - Brown Beats – with The Beets Brothers, 2012, Maxanter
- With Dave Liebman
  - Lieb plays Alec Wilder, 2003, Daybreak/Challenge Records (1994)
  - Lieb plays Kurt Weill, 2008, Daybreak/Challenge Records (1994)
  - Lieb plays The Blues a la Trane, 2008, Daybreak/Challenge Records (1994)
  - Lieb plays The Beatles, 2013, Daybreak/Challenge Records (1994)
- With Chet Baker
  - Blue Room – with Frans Elsen and Victor Kaihatu, Jazz Detective, 2023
- With Al Cohn
  - Rifftide, 1987, Timeless Records
  - Rifftide, 2016, Timeless Records Jazz Master Collection (Japan)
- With Barry Harris
  - Post Masterclass Concert, 1991, Blue Jack
- With Jimmy Raney
- Raney '81 (Criss Cross, 1981) with Doug Raney and Jesper Lundgaard
- With Ronnie Cuber/Beets Brothers
  - Infra Rae, 2009, Maxanter
- With Dave Pike/Charles McPherson (musician)
  - Blue Bird, 1988, Timeless Records
- With George Coleman
  - On Green Dolphin Street, 1974, Blue Jack
- With Hein van der Gaag
  - The Second Time Around, Hein van der Gaag Trio, 1974, Polydor Records
- With Dexter Gordon
  - All Souls, 1972, Dexterity
  - Afterhours/The Great Pescara Jam Sessions Vol 1&2, 1973, Ports Song
  - Fried Bananas, Live recording VPRO radio 1972, Gearbox label LP( vinyl) GB1535 ( U.K.) and available on CD, 2016
- With Ben Webster
  - Live in Hot House – with Tete Montoliu, 1972, not on label
  - The Brute and The Beautiful – with Tete Montoliu, 1972, Storyville Records
  - Live in Hot House – with Tete Montoliu, 1972, Timeless/Tidal Waves 2023
- With Don Friedman
  - Togetherness, 1989, Limetree
- With René Thomas (guitarist)
  - Guitar Genius, 1972, RTBF
- With Rein de Graaff
  - Chasin’ The Bird, 1981, Timeless Records
  - Bebop, Ballads and Blues, 1981, Timeless Records
  - Alone Together – with Frits Landesbergen, 1987, Timeless Records
  - Blue Greens & Beans – with David "Fathead" Newman /Marcel Ivery, 1990, Timeless Records
  - Tenor Conclave – with Teddy Edwards/Von Freeman/Buck Hill (musician), 1992, Timeless Records
  - Thinking of You – with Conte Candoli/Bob Cooper (musician), 1993, Timeless Records
  - Bariton Explosion – with Ronnie Cuber/Nick Brignola, 1994, Timeless Records
  - Nostalgia – with Barry Harris/Gary Foster (musician)/Marco Kegel, 1994, Timeless Records
  - Blue Lights, The Music of Gigi Gryce – with Herb Geller/John Stanley Marshall, 2005, Blue Jack
  - Now Is The Time – Compilation, Timeless Records
  - Confirmation – Compilation, Timeless Records
  - Ornithology – Compilation, Timeless Records
  - Good Bait – with Ferdinand Povel/Pete Christlieb, 2008, Timeless Records
  - Indian Summer – with Sam Most, 2011, Timeless Records
  - Early Morning Blues – with Marius Beets, 2019, Timeless Records
- With Rein de Graaff/Dick Vennik Quartet/Sextet
  - Departure, 1971, BASF
  - Point Of No Return, 1973, Universe
  - Modal Soul, 1977, Timeless Records
  - Cloud People, 1984, Timeless Records
  - Jubilee, 1989, Timeless Records
  - Modal Soul, 2016, Timeless Records Jazz Master Collection (Japan)
- With Scott Hamilton and Rein de Graaff trio
  - Live at the Jazzroom, Breda the Netherlands, 2013, Jazzroom
  - Live at De Tor, 2023, Timeless Records
- With Rob Agerbeek
  - Home Run, 1971, Blue Jack
  - Keep the Change, 1975, Munich
  - Little Miss Dee, 1980, Limetree
- With Rob Madna
  - I Got It Bad And That Ain’t Good, 1976, Atelier Sawano
  - Broadcast Business ’76 – with Ferdinand Povel, 1976, Daybreak/Challenge Records (1994)
  - The Music of Rob Madna – with Dutch Jazz Orchestra, 1994/'95, Challenge Records (1994)
  - En Blanc et Noir – with Ferdinand Povel, 2000, Daybreak/Challenge Records (1994)
- With Ferdinand Povel
  - Calling Joanna, 1969, Cat Jazz
  - Live at Café Hopper – with Rob Madna, 2000, Daybreak/Challenge Records (1994)
- With Piet Noordijk
  - Piet Noordijk Quartet Live, 1988, Varagram
  - The Song is You, 1993, Timeless Records
  - Piet plays Bird, 1997, Via Records
- With The Dutch Jazz Orchestra
  - Jerry van Rooyen – On the Scene, 1993, Timeless Records
  - The Music of Billy Strayhorn, 1995/2002, 4 CD Box, Challenge Records (1994)
  - The Lady Who Swings The Band, 2005, Challenge Records (1994)
  - Moon Dreams, 2006, Challenge Records (1994)
  - Out of the Shadows Billy Strayhorn, 2014, Storyville Records
- With Irv Rochlin
  - Quirine, 1980, Limetree
  - Line for F.P, 1982, Munich
- With Charles Loos
  - Quelque Part, with Charles Loos/John Ruocco/Serge Lazarevitch/Riccardo Del Fra, 1983, LDH
- With The Ben van den Dungen/Jarmo Hoogendijk Quintet
  - Speak Up, 1989, Timeless Records
  - Run For Your Wife, 1991, Timeless Records
  - Double Dutch, 1993, PTSD/EMI
- With Ben van den Dungen Quartet
  - Live at Lux & Tivoli, 2021, JWA Records
- With Wolfert Brederode
  - Alternate Views, 1997, A-Records/Challenge Records (1994)
  - Far Enough – with Nimbus, 1999, Buzz Records/Challenge Records (1994)
  - Festina Lente – with Nimbus/Dave Liebman, 2001, Buzz Records/Challenge Records (1994), (Edison Award Nomination)
  - En Blanc et Noir – with Jasper Blom, 2003, Daybreak/Challenge Records (1994)
- With Arnold Klos
  - Heart Strings, 2002, Atelier Sawano
  - One To Get Her, 2003, Atelier Sawano
  - Beautiful Love, 2007, Atelier Sawano
  - Elsa, 2008, Atelier Sawano
  - Peace Piece, 2011, Atelier Sawano
  - It could happen to you, 2014, Atelier Sawano
- With Sanna van Vliet
  - A Time For Love – with Ferdinand Povel, 2005, Maxanter
  - Dance On The Moon – with Joe Cohn/Sjoerd Dijkhuizen, 2009, Maxanter
- With Triplicate
  - Three and One, 2010, Self
- With Free Fair
  - Free Fair, 1978, Timeless Records
  - Free Fair 2, 1979, Timeless Records
  - Free Fair +8, 1981, Limetree
- With Rik van den Bergh/Bart van Lier Quintet
  - High slide, Low blow, 2013, Maxanter
- With B.J. Ward/Donn Trenner
  - Vocalise, 1970, Catfish
- With Yvonne Walter
  - Bittersweet, 2012/2013, September
- With Yvonne Walter and The Marriage in Modern Jazzrevival Band
  - Time to Swing - Live at the Headroom, 2021, YK Records
- With Gerry van der Klei/Boy Edgar
  - Multifaced Gerry, 1975, Poker
- With The Four Freshmen, Rob van Kreeveld, Koos Serierse and Eric Ineke – with Stan Kenton Orchestra/Ann Richards (singer)
  - Road Shows, 1994, Tantara records
- With Laurence Fish
  - Sen's Fortress, 2017, O.A.P. Records
- With Joan Benavent
  - Opening O3, with Matt Baker, Santi Navalon, Voro Garcia, Toni Beleaguer, 2017, SedaJazz Records
- With The Rob Franken Electrification
  - Together with o.a Rob Franken, Joop Scholten and Wim Essed, 2018, 678 records (Vinyl)
- With Aleka Potinga
  - Person I Knew, with Ronan Guilfoyle, Chris Guilfoyle, Michael Buckley, 2019, Self production
- With Convection Section/Richard Pulin
  - Confrontation, 1972, Munich Records
- With Neerlands Hoop in Bange dagen/Freek de Jonge/Bram Vermeulen
  - Neerlands Hoop in Panama, 1971, Imperial Records
- With Gijs Hendriks
  - Rockin' , 1972, Polydor Records
- With Casey & The Pressure Group
  - Memphis Revisited, 1972, Polydor Records
- With Jossche Monitzs & Hot Club 69
  - Hot Club 69, 1972, Polydor Records
- With Joop Hendriks
  - Joop Hendrik Quartet feat.Peter Grimston, 1975, Marktown Records
  - Both Sides, 1982, Feel The Jazz Vol. 8
- With Mat Mathews Orchestra
  - V.S.O.P. with Lee Towers, 1975, Ariola Records
- With Wim Koopmans /Jerry van Rooyen Orchestra
  - I Wish You Love, 1987, IP Records
- With Doug Webb Trio
  - Doug Webb in Holland - with Marius Beets, 2019, Daybreak/Challenge Records (1994)
- With Joop Scholten
  - Joop Scholten - with Rob Franken, Koos Serierse, 1977, Greensville Records
- With Joan Benavent
  - Sunrise, with Bart van Lier, Pep Zaragoza, Miquel Rodriguez, Steve Zwanink, 2019, Seda Jazz Records
- With the Frans Elsen Septet feat. Piet Noordijk
  - Norway - Treasures of Dutch Jazz, 2021, NJA Records
- Toots Thielemans meets Rob Franken
  - The Studio Sessions 1973-1983, Treasures of Dutch Jazz- Nederland Jazz Archief ( 2022)
- With Enrico Le Noci
  - Common Ground, – with Arno Krijger and Pietro Mirabassi, 2023, ZenneZ Records
- With Charlotte Storer
  - Meandering, – with Ofer Landsberg, Uli Glassmann, 2019, Gut String Records
- With Chakseng Lam
  - Steps Forward, – with Chakseng Lam, José Ctalá Gonzáles, Rob van Bavel, Jim van de Klundert, Kyriacos Kesta, 2022, Jazz World Records
- With Marcela Hendriks
  - Marcela Sings, – with Benjamin Herman, Rein de Graaff, Marius Beets, 2023, Solid Records
- With Steve Nelson Trio
  - A Common Language, – with Steve Nelson, Joris Teepe, 2023, Daybreak

=== Masterclasses ===
- Dworp Summer Jazz Clinics Dworp 1984/1985
- IASJ Meeting New School New York 1994/2022
- IASJ Meeting Accademia Nazionale del Jazz Sienna 1997
- IASJ Meeting Conservatoire de Paris 2000
- New Park Music Centre Dublin 2001
- Conservatoire de Paris 2013
- IASJ Meeting Royal Academy of Music Aarhus 2013
- Universidade Lusiada Lisbon 2014/2016/2017/2022
- Ionian University Corfu 2013/2014/2015/2016/2017/2018/2019
- SedaJazz School Valencia 2014/2016/2017
- IASJ Meeting Universidade Lisboa 2015
- Metropolia University Helsinki 2015
- Newpark School Dublin 2016/2017
- Lemmens Institute Leuven 2016
- Karelia University Joensuu 2016
- CIT Cork School Of Music, Cork 2017
- Sibelius Academy Helsinki 2017
- Pescara Conservatory 2017
- Drumschool Stefan van de Brug The Hague 2016/2017
- Escola Superior de Musica de Lisboa, Lisbon 2018/2019
- Dublin City University 2018/2019/2022/2024

== Sources ==
- Jazz.com, Encyclopedia of Jazz musicians
- Autobiography Eric Ineke, Muziekencyclopedie
- The Biographical Encyclopedia of Jazz, Leonard Feather and Ira Gitler
- The New Grove Dictionary of Jazz, Barry Kernfeld
- Jazz en Omstreken, Ruud Kuyper
- Jazz in Stijl, Ruud Kuyper
- Belevenissen in Bebop, Coen de jonge
- 100 Jaar Jazz in Den Haag, Arie van Breda
