= Ben van den Dungen =

Dutch jazz trumpeter and music educator (born 1965)

- Born: October 29, 1960 (age 65); The Hague, The Netherlands
- Genres: Jazz, bebop, hard bop, latin jazz, tango
- Occupations: Saxophonist, bandleader, composer, music educator
- Instrument: Saxophone
- Years active: 1980s – present
- Website: benvandendungen.nl

Ben van den Dungen (The Hague, born 29 October 1960) is a Dutch jazz saxophonist, composer and music educator. Van den Dungen studied at the Royal Conservatoire The Hague, graduating cum laude (1988). He has been performing nationally and internationally since the 1980s and teaches at the Codarts Jazz Academy Rotterdam.

== Biography ==
Ben decided to play the saxophone in the early 1980s, after dropping out of school, without any previous musical education. He was accepted into the Haags Conservatorium where he was taught by Ruud Brink, Ferdinand Povel, Sandy Mosse and Sal Nistico. During his studies, he joined Jan Laurens Hartong's latin jazz group Nueva Manteca.

Together with fellow student Jarmo Hoogendijk he started the Ben van den Dungen/jarmo Hoogendijk Quintet, with drummer Eric Ineke, bass player Harry Emmery and pianist Rob van Bavel. The quintet received the NOS Jazz Award (1985) and had considerable success performing in The Netherlands, including several performances at the North Sea Jazz Festival, and abroad. After Hoogendijk sustained an embouchure injury and quit playing in 2004, their musical collaboration ended.

Early 2000s, he traveled to India to study, resulting in the How2BE project. Over the years, he has continued performing there in different setups. In 2003 he started combining tango with jazz and other styles of music with the ensemble Tango Extremo/Musica Extrema, together with his partner Tanya Schaap. Van den Dungen also played in the Louis van Dijk Super Band and with Lucas van Merwijks Cubop City Big Band.

He formed the Ben van den Dungen Quartet in 2010 with pianist Miguel Rodriguez, bassist Marius Beets and drummer Gijs Dijkhuizen. Up until 2023, the band has released five albums. As of 2023, he is also still performing with Nueva Manteca.

During his career, Van den Dungen has played with various international musicians from the jazz and world music scenes, including Cindy Blackman, Mal Waldron, Woody Shaw, Luis Conte, Orestes Vilato, Armando Peraza, Giovanni Hildalgo, Nicky Marrero, Claudio Roditi and Ralph Irizarry.

== Teaching ==
Van den Dungen has been teaching at the Codarts Jazz Academy Rotterdam since 1991. He acted as head of Codarts' jazz department for a number of years. He also produced several jazz summer schools in Korea, Bali and India.

== Other activities ==
Van den Dungen has also been active as composer, producer, representative for artists' interests and as podcast maker.

== Bands and selected discography ==
A selection of bands in which Van den Dungen performed:

Ben van den Dungen/Jarmo Hoogendijk Quintet

- Heart of the Matter (1987, Timeless Records)
- Speak Up (1989, Timeless)
- Run for your Wife (1991, Timeless)
- Double Dutch (1995, Groove)

Louis van Dijk Super Band

Ben van den Dungen Quartet

- Obsession Blues (2023, JWA Records)
- Live at Lux & Tivoli (2021, JWA Records)
- 2 Sessions (2017, JWA Records)
- A Night at the club (2014, JWA Records)
- Ciao City (2013, JWA Records)

Nueva Manteca

- ART (2022, JWA Records)
- Crime (2015, JWA Records)
- 25 years: Live at Bimhuis; Live at Nick Vollebregt's, (2013, JWA Records)
- A Latin Tribute to West Side Story (2003, Munich Records)
- Congo Square (2001, Munich Records)
- Night People (1998, Azucar / EMI)
- Afro Cuban Sanctus (1997, Azucar / EMI)
- Let's Face the Music and Dance (1995, Blue Note)
- In concert at Nick Vollebregt's JazzCafé (1995, Wereldomroep)
- Porgy & Bess (1993, EMI)
- Bluesongo (1992, EMI)
- Afrodisia (1990, Timeless)
- Varadero Blues (1989, Timeless)

Musica Extrema/Tango Extremo

- Missa (2020, JWA Records)
- Club Vaudeville (2017, JWA Records)
- Mattheus Passie (2016, JWA Records)
- Havana (2015, JWA Records)
- Tango Extremo LIVE! (LP - 2013, STS Records)
- Dama de blanco (2013, JWA Records)
- DeLaMar Live (2012, JWA Records)
- Toujour bizarre (2012, JWA Records)
- Fantango (2012, JWA Records)
- Carnaval de Buenos Aires (2009, Maxanter Records – The World Series)
- Erase una vez... (2008, Munich Records)
- El Silencio (2003, Munich Records)
- Una Cosa Differente (2005, Munich Records)

How2Be

- How to be Enlightened (2005, Dox)

Cubop City Big Band

- Arsenio (2002, Tam Tam Records)
- Live in The Hague (1999, Tam Tam Records)
- Moré & More (1998, Tam Tam Records)
