= Fire (Fleurine album) =

Studio album by Fleurine
- Released: 2002
- Genre: Jazz
- Label: Coast to Coast
- Producer: Robert Sadin

Fire is the third album by vocalist Fleurine.

== Background ==
Fleurine and pianist Brad Mehldau had played together on the singer's Close Enough for Love. Fire was produced by Robert Sadin.

== Music and recording ==
The album was recorded in New York City around 2003. Two of the 12 tracks are originals. The other tracks include: "Fire" by Bruce Springsteen; "Show Me the Way" by Peter Frampton; "Fruit Tree" by Nick Drake; and Paul Simon's "Still Crazy After All These Years."

== Reception ==
The Los Angeles Times commented on "her warm, enveloping sound and gentle, rhythmic drive transform the songs into something well beyond the original sources."

== Track listing ==
1. "Fire" – 3:33 Music & lyrics Bruce Springsteen, arrangement by Fleurine
2. "Fruit Tree" – 5:02 Music & lyrics by Nick Drake, arrangement by Fleurine
3. "Show Me the Way" – 3:58 Music & lyrics by Peter Frampton
4. "Suavidade" – 4:55 Music by Jose Lopretti, lyrics by Lilian Vieira & Fleurine
5. "Brass in Pocket" – 3:48 Music & Lyrics by Chrissie Hynde & James Honeyman Scott, arrangement by Fleurine
6. "Don't Be Blue" – 4:17 Music by John Guerin & lyrics by Michael Franks, arrangement by Fleurine
7. "So Tinha de Ser com Você" – 4:12 Music by Jobim, lyrics by Aloysio de Oliveira
8. "Haven't We Met" – 1:50 Music by Kenny Rankin, lyrics by Ruth Bachelar
9. "Après un Rêve" – 6:08 Music by Gabriel Faure, lyrics by Romaine Bussine, arrangement by Brad Mehldau & Fleurine
10. "Still Crazy After All These Years" – 3:29 Music & Lyrics by Paul Simon arrangement by Brad Mehldau & Fleurine
11. "Você" – 4:13 Music by Jose Lopretti & Fleurine, lyrics by Fleurine
12. "Hey Little Girl" – 4:00 Music & lyrics by Fleurine

== Personnel ==
- Fleurine – vocals
- Jesse van Ruller – guitar (except track 8)
- Johan Plomp – bass (except track 7)
- Jeff Ballard – drums, percussion (except tracks 4, 7, 8)
- Brad Mehldau – piano (tracks 2, 9, 12)
- Gil Goldstein – accordion (track 4)
- Seamus Blake – tenor sax (tracks 5, 7)
- Peter Bernstein – guitar (track 6)
