= Jarmo Hoogendijk =

Dutch jazz trumpeter and music educator (born 1965)

- Born: 28 March 1965 (age 60); Den Helder, The Netherlands
- Genres: Jazz, bebop, hard bop
- Occupation(s): Trumpet player, bandleader, music educator
- Instrument(s): Trumpet, flugelhorn
- Years active: 1981 – 2004
- Website: jarmohoogendijk.com

Jarmo Hoogendijk (born 28 March 1965) is a Dutch former jazz trumpet and flugelhorn player. He performed successfully from the 1980s until 2004, when he ended his active career as a musician. Since then, he has been teaching music at three major Dutch music academies: Royal Conservatoire The Hague, Codarts Jazz Academy Rotterdam and the Amsterdam University of the Arts.

== Biography ==
Hoogendijk was born in Den Helder. He studied with trumpet and flügelhorn player Ack van Rooyen at the Royal Conservatoire The Hague. While still a student there, he formed the Ben van den Dungen/Jarmo Hoogendijk Quintet. The group won the NOS Meervaart Jazz Award and had considerable success performing in The Netherlands, including several performances at the North Sea Jazz Festival, and abroad. In 1986, Hoogendijk won the Pall Mall Export Award.

During 1986-88 he befriended and worked with Woody Shaw, who was then living in The Netherlands. Hoogendijk also played with Jan Laurens Hartong's latin jazz group Nueva Manteca, Lucas van Merwijk's Cubop City Big Band, Jarmo Savolainen's quintet, Louis van Dijk's Super Band and Pierre Courbois's quintet. He performed with Cindy Blackman, Rita Reys, Teddy Edwards, Charles McPherson, J.J. Johnson, Jimmy Heath, Art Taylor and Frank Morgan and played in so-called trumpet summits with Clark Terry, Benny Bailey, Lew Soloff en Philip Harper. He appeared on Dutch TV with Freddie Hubbard and the Metropole Orkest.

After graduating cum laude at the Royal Conservatoire himself he started teaching there, as well as at the Rotterdam Codarts Jazz Academy. Since 2018 he also teaches at the Amsterdam University of the Arts. He taught numerous trumpet players and other musicians, among whom Teus Nobel, Thomas Fryland, Maria Mendes (Grammy nominated vocalist), Colin Benders and the full trumpet section of the Metropole Orkest.

== Bands and selected discography ==
A selection of bands in which Hoogendijk performed:

- Ben van den Dungen/Jarmo Hoogendijk Quintet
  - Heart of the Matter (1987, Timeless Records)
  - Speak Up (1989, Timeless)
  - Run for your Wife (1991, Timeless)
  - Double Dutch (1995, Groove)
- Nueva Manteca (led by Jan Laurens Hartong)
  - Varadero Blues (1989, Timeless)
  - Afrodisia - with Nicky Marrero (1991, Timeless)
  - Porgy & Bess (1993, Lucho / EMI)
  - Let's Face the Music and Dance (1994, Lucho / EMI | 1996, Blue Note Records)
  - Afro Cuban Sanctus (1997, Azucar / EMI)
  - Night People (1998, Azucar / EMI)
  - Congo Square: Tribute to New Orleans (2001, Munich Records)
  - Latin Tribute to West Side Story (2003, Munich Records)
- Bye-Ya!
  - Bye-Ya! – The Latin-Jazz Quintet (2001, A-Records)
  - Dos (2003, A-Records)
- Cubop City Big Band (led by Lucas van Merwijk)
  - Moré & More (1997, Tam Tam Records)
  - Live in The Hague (1999, Tam Tam Records)
  - Arsenio (2002, Tam Tam Records)
- European Trumpet Summit (with Enrico Rava, Allan Botchinsky and Thomas Heberer)
  - European Trumpet Summit (Konnex Records, 1995)
- Louis van Dijk Super Band
