= Hartong =

Hartong is a surname of Dutch origin. Notable people with the surname include:

- Corrie Hartong (1906–1991), Dutch dancer, dance teacher and choreographer
- Emily Hartong (born 1992), American female volleyball player
- Jan Laurens Hartong (1941–2016), Dutch pianist, composer, arranger and teacher
- Laura Hartong (born 1958), British former television actress
- Lucas Hartong (born 1963), Dutch politician
