= Laurillard =

Laurillard is a surname. Notable people with the surname include:

- Alan Laurillard (born 1946), Canadian composer
- Charles Léopold Laurillard (1783–1853), French zoologist, a student of Georges Cuvier and he made zoological illustrations for Cuvier
- Edward Laurillard (1870–1936), cinema and theatre producer
