= Benjamin Herman =

Dutch jazz musician (born 1968)

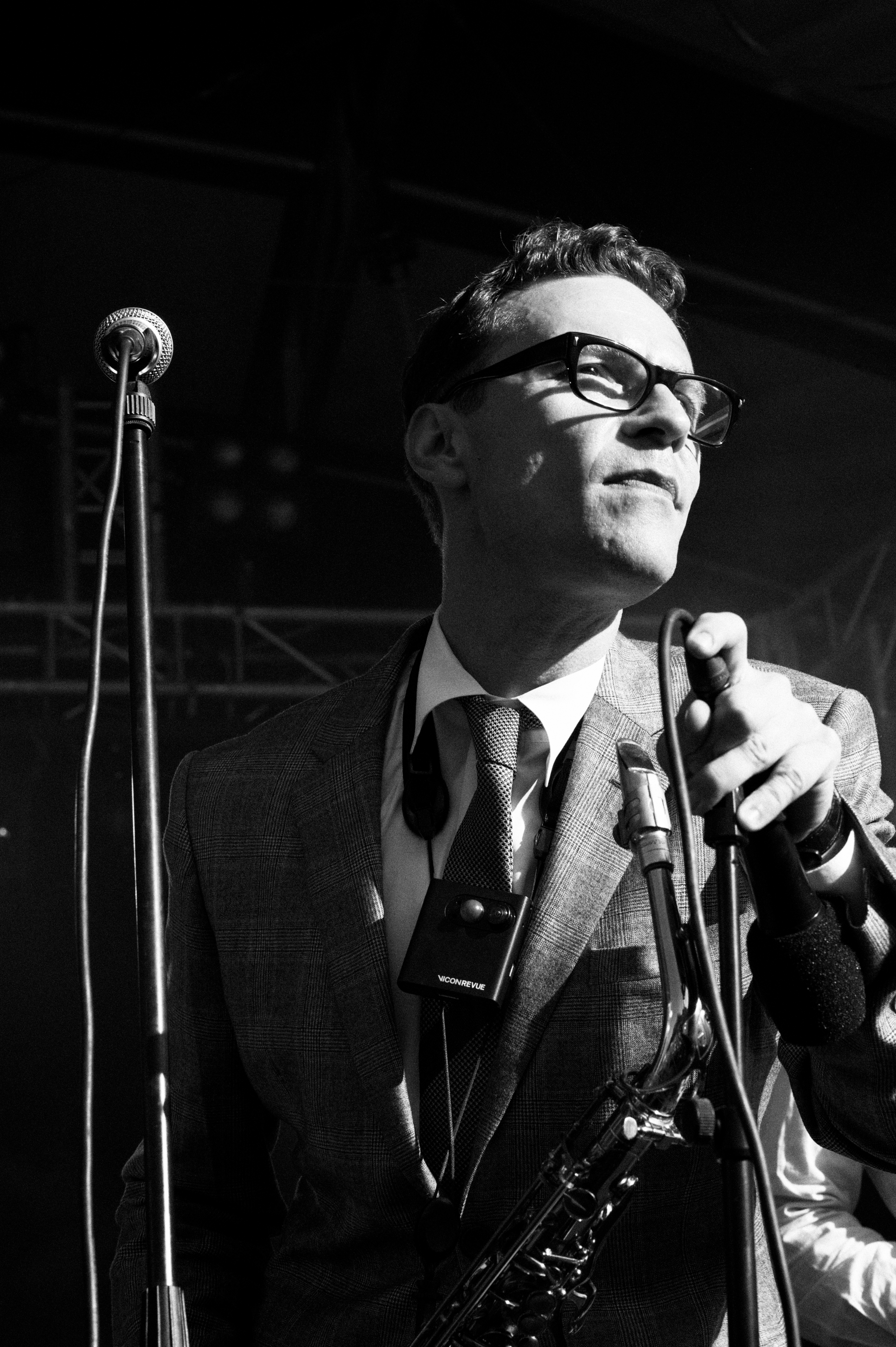

Background information
- Born: 9 May 1968 (age 57); London, United Kingdom
- Genres: Jazz
- Occupation: Jazz musician
- Instruments: Alto saxophone, C-melody saxophone, flute

Benjamin Herman (London, 9 May 1968) is a Dutch jazz musician. He is best known as an alto saxophonist and as leader of the jazz band New Cool Collective. Herman also plays the C-melody saxophone and flute. He also has a radio show on Radio 6 (Netherlands).

== Biography ==
Herman comes from a family of six children. His twin brother Jonathan works as a film director. His mother is Dutch; his father was a rabbi and worked as a psychotherapist. At the age of eight, Herman and his family moved to the Netherlands.

At the age of twelve, Herman started playing the saxophone. At thirteen, he was already performing on the professional club circuit. Within a few years, Benjamin had played all over the world with various groups and initiated his own projects. When he was seventeen, Herman played for the first time at the North Sea Jazz Festival.

Herman studied at the Hilversum Conservatory, from which he graduated cum laude in 1991. In that year, he was the only European selected for the Thelonious Monk Competition. He also studied at the Manhattan School of Music in New York.

In 1993, Herman founded New Cool Collective, an eight-piece band with influences from jazz, soul and Latin music. He composes the music for this band, as well as the bigger New Cool Collective Big Band, and is also the leader of both.

Benjamin Herman has played with musicians such as Jan Akkerman, Candy Dulfer, Wouter Hamel, Trijntje Oosterhuis, Jesse van Ruller, Typhoon, Jazz Orchestra of the Concertgebouw, Misha Mengelberg, Pete Philly & Perquisite, Hans Teeuwen, C-Mon & Kypski, Chef'Special, Dr. John, Michel Camilo, Paul Weller, and Han Bennink.

In 2012, Herman released the album Deal, which is also the soundtrack of Eddy Terstalls move of the same name. Herman recorded this album with Jesse van Ruller, Joost Kroon, Manuel Hugas, Carlo de Wijs and The City of Prague Philharmonic Orchestra.

Benjamin Herman released a new solo album, Café Solo, in July 2013, featuring Ernst Glerum (bass) and Joost Patocka (drums).

His album Live (release date 24 January 2014) has Herman and his quartet playing on the occasion of De Kring's 90th anniversary. His previous album Café Solo already included two tracks of those recordings and now, due to popular demand, the other tracks have been made available. Live also features two tracks from a concert Herman gave with his trio in November 2013 during Jazzfest at Amsterdam's Studio/K.

Besides his usual rhythm section of Ernst Glerum and Joost Patočka, Herman is accompanied by the Spanish pianist Miguel Rodríguez, who has been the house pianist for De Kring sessions for the last 1.5 years.

Benjamin Herman's 16th solo album Trouble is released on 11 July 2014. In a new departure for the multi-talented saxophonist, his latest solo disc is a joint project with 24-year-old Daniel von Piekartz.

For the first time in his career, Herman has devoted an entire album to vocal numbers. “Daniel originally planned to play on two tracks. He is incredibly musical and ideas just kept flowing... we didn’t want it to stop,” Herman recalls. Von Piekartz plays and sings on eight of the ten tracks.

In 2019 Herman started his own podcast Get In! on Dutch public radio NPO, presenting weekly selections of tracks inspired by his favorite musicians, films and documentaries. After 185 episodes in its first run, the podcast returned with a second season in 2023.

In 2021 he recorded When Will The Blues Leave with drummer John Engels and bassist Joris Teepe, released in March 2021. The album was recorded in the empty Bimhuis concert hall during the COVID-19 pandemic.

In September 2022 Herman released True Love’s Flame, a collaboration with vocalist Anna Serierse. The album was inspired by noir-like soundtracks and the surreal films of David Lynch.

In 2023 Herman released the studio album Nostalgia Blitz, blending jazz with electronic influences.

In 2024 Herman received the Edison Jazz Oeuvre Award, one of the highest distinctions in Dutch jazz.

Recent projects include Bughouse: The ERUS/ARC Sessions (2024), Café Largo (EP, 2024), and Everything Is OK (2024). In May 2025 he released Nostalgia Blitz (Deluxe Edition), featuring remixes by artists including Legowelt and Zongamin.

In 2025 Herman launched The Tokyo Sessions, a multi-year project exploring Japanese jazz, film and popular culture. This will result in concerts in Europe and Japan and a forthcoming album. A documentary directed by his twin brother Jonathan Herman will premiere at the 2025 Expo in Osaka.

In July 2025 Herman appeared at the North Sea Jazz Festival in Rotterdam in a special conversation and performance with trumpeter Adam O’Farrill.

In October 2025 he presents the sixth edition of the European Alto Festival in Rotterdam, featuring guest saxophonists Erena Terakubo (Japan) and Miru Han (South Korea).

== Discography ==
Albums and singles released by Benjamin Herman. "Artist" denotes with whom or in which formation Benjamin Herman released the album or single.

Albums/Vinyl
| Year | Title | Artist |
|---|---|---|
| 1991 | Between a Dog and a Lamppost | Maarten van der Grinten/Herman Quartet |
| 1994 | Psychodixie for C-Melody Saxophone | Van der Grinten/Herman Quartet |
| 1994 | Five Up High | Featuring Marius Beets, Joost Patocka and Jasper Blom |
| 1996 | Lost Languages in Sad Serenades & Jocular Jazz | Van der Grinten/Herman Quartet |
| 1996 | Café Alto | Benjamin Herman Trio |
| 1999 | Get In | With Jesse van Ruller, Larry Goldings and Idris Muhammad |
| 2000 | Plays Misha Mengelberg | With Jos Machtel and Martijn Vink |
| 2001 | Plays Jaki Byard | With Pierre Christophe |
| 2004 | Heterogeneity | With Misha Mengelberg and Bert Joris |
| 2005 | The Itch | With Han Bennink, Anton Goudsmit and Ernst Glerum |
| 2006 | The London Session | With Bart van Lier and Stan Tracey |
| 2006 | A Curse and a Sigh | Van der Grinten / Herman Quartet |
| 2007 | Campert. De Tijd Duurt Eén Mens Lang | With Gideon van Gelder and Remco Campert |
| 2008 | Hypochristmastreefuzz. More Mengelberg | Benjamin Herman with Ernst Glerum, Joost Patocka, Anton Goudsmit, Willem Friede and Ruben Hein |
| 2009 | Deelder 65 | (10" vinyl with cd) |
| 2009 | Blue Sky Blond | With Paul Weller, Perquisite and Jesse van Ruller |
| 2010 | Hypochristmastreefuzz (Special Edition) | |
| 2010 | Made in China 7" vinyl ep | With IACW and Janne Schra |
| 2011 | Sherry Britton/Tempest Storm 7" vinyl | |
| 2012 | DEAL | With Jesse van Ruller, Joost Kroon, Manuel Hugas and Carlo de Wijs |
| 2013 | Café Solo | With Joost Patocka and Ernst Glerum |
| 2014 | Live | With Joost Patocka, Ernst Glerum and Miguel Rodriguez |
| 2014 | Trouble | With Joost Patocka, Ernst Glerum, Daniel von Piekartz and Miguel Rodriguez |
| 2015 | Swing de Paris | With The Robin Nolan Trio |
| 2018 | Project S | With Rory Ronde, Joost Kroon, Peter Schlamb, Alexander von Popta, Manuel Hugas and The City of Prague Philharmonic Orchestra |
| 2018 | Bughouse | With Reinier Baas, Peter Peskens and Olav van den Berg |
| 2021 | When Will The Blues Leave | With John Engels and Joris Teepe |
| 2022 | True Love's Flame | With Anna Serierse, Alexander van Popta, Thomas Pol, Niek de Bruijn |
| 2023 | Nostalgia Blitz | With Thomas Pol, Jimmi Hueting, Shinpei Ruike |
| 2024 | Bughouse: The ERUS/ARC Sessions | With Reinier Baas, Peter Peskens and Olav van den Berg |
| 2024 | Café Largo | With Mayuko Katakura, Thomas Pol, Joost Patocka |
| 2025 | Nostalgia Blitz (Deluxe Edition) | With Zongamin, Legowelt and sepiarecorders |
| 2026 | TBA | |
Singles
| Year | Title | |
| 2004 | Skunkaholic | |
| 2005 | Durban Poison | |
| 2005 | Haze | |
New Cool Collective
| Year | Title | |
| 1996 | Soul Jazz Latin Flavours Nineties Vibe | New Cool Collective |
| 1997 | More! Soul Jazz Latin Flavours Nineties Vibes | New Cool Collective |
| 1999 | Big | New Cool Collective |
| 2001 | Bring It On | New Cool Collective |
| 2004 | Best of 94-99 | New Cool Collective |
| 2005 | Trippin' | New Cool Collective, featuring Tony Allen |
| 2008 | Out of Office | New Cool Collective |
| 2007 | New Cool Collective Big Band Live | New Cool Collective Big Band |
| 2009 | Chocolade | New Cool Collective with Typhoon |
| 2009 | Sugar Protocol | New Cool Collective featuring Los Papines |
| 2010 | Pachinko | New Cool Collective Big Band |
| 2010 | In Concert | New Cool Collective |
| 2011 | Eighteen | New Cool Collective |
| 2013 | Chin Chin | New Cool Collective |
| 2014 | Electric Monkey Sessions | New Cool Collective |
| 2014 | Hollandse Meesters | New Cool Collective with Guus Meeuwis |
| 2016 | The Things You Love | New Cool Collective with Matt Bianco |
| 2017 | New Cool Collective Big Band featuring Thierno Koite | New Cool Collective with Thierno Koite |
| 2017 | Electric Monkey Sessions 2 | New Cool Collective |
| 2018 | XXV | New Cool Collective |
| 2019 | Dansé Dansé | New Cool Collective |
| 2020 | Trippin' Redux | New Cool Collective with Tony Allen |
| 2020 | High Anxiety | New Cool Collective with Matt Bianco |
| 2021 | Yunikōn | New Cool Collective |
| 2022 | Trippin' (Reissue) | New Cool Collective with Tony Allen |
| 2023 | Opus 127 | New Cool Collective with Alma Quartet |
| 2024 | 30 Years Live | New Cool Collective Big Band |
| 2025 | On Tour | New Cool Collective Big Band |

== Awards ==
- 1991 – Wessel Ilcken Prijs
- 2000 – Edison Award with New Cool Collective, best jazz album (BIG)
- 2001 – Heineken Crossover Award with New Cool Collective
- 2001 – De Gouden Notekraker with New Cool Collective
- 2005 – Edison Award best jazz album (Heterogeneity)
- 2005 – Feel Good Jazz Award
- 2006 – VPRO/Boy Edgar Prijs
- 2008 – Equire Magazine Best Dressed Man 2008
- 2008 – Edison Award best jazz album (Campert, de Tijd Duurt Eén Mens Lang)
- 2017 – Edison Award with New Cool Collective, best world music album (‘'New Cool Collective Big Band featuring Thierno Koite'’)
- 2018 – Edison Award, best world music album (''New Cool Collective Big Band featuring Thierno Koite'')
- 2022 – Sublime Oeuvre Award
- 2024 – Edison Jazz Oeuvre Award
