= Seamus Blake =

Tenor saxophonist and composer

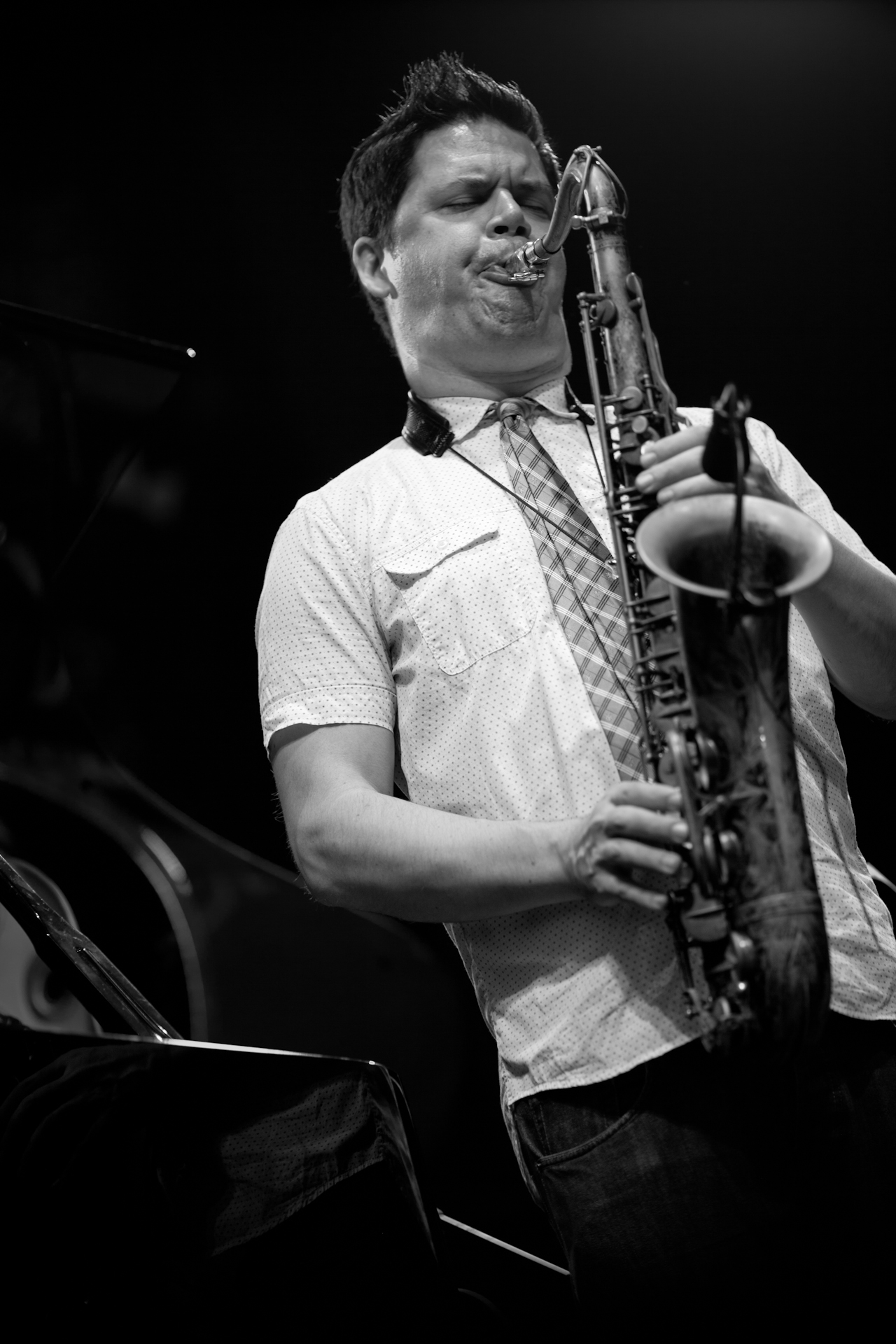
- Blake in 2012

Background information
- Born: December 8, 1970 (age 55); London, England
- Origin: Vancouver, British Columbia, Canada
- Genre: Jazz
- Occupation: Musician
- Instruments: Saxophone; EWI
- Years active: 1993–present
- Label: Criss Cross
- Website: seamusblake.com

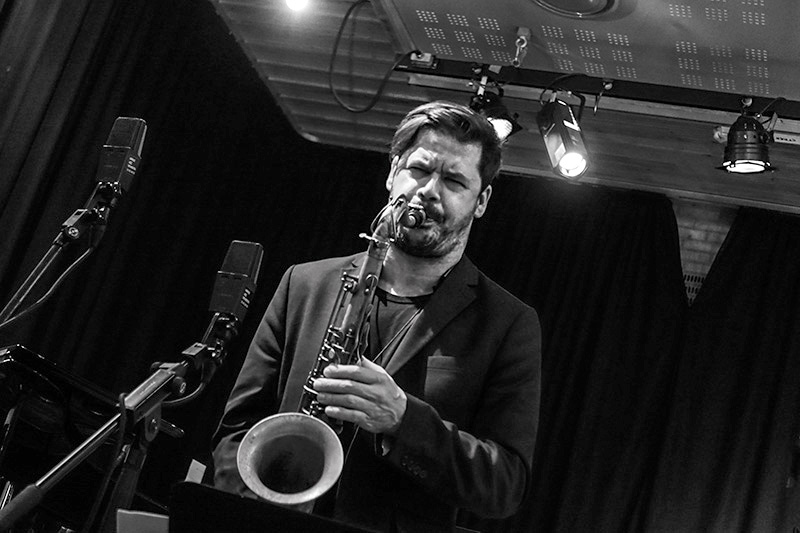
Seamus Blake performing with Aarhus Jazz Orchestra in Aarhus, Denmark, 2017

Seamus Blake (born December 8, 1970) is a British-born Canadian tenor saxophonist.

== Early life and education ==
Blake was born in London, England and raised in Vancouver, British Columbia, Canada. His mother introduced him to jazz when he was a child and he later attended the Berklee College of Music in Boston.

== Career ==
Upon graduation, he moved to New York City. In February 2002, he won the Thelonious Monk International Saxophone Competition. He currently plays with his own quintet (featuring David Kikoski, Lage Lund, Bill Stewart, and Matt Clohesy) and has been a regular with the Mingus Big Band as well as many other New York musicians.

In 2022 Seamus became a member of Roger Waters touring band for the This Is Not a Drill tour. Seamus is playing sax on Pink Floyd classic songs as well as Waters solo material. Blake appears with the band in the concert film from this tour, This is Not a Drill: Live from Prague, The Movie, filmed in 2023.

== Discography ==
=== As leader ===
- The Call (Criss Cross Jazz, 1994) – rec. 1993
- The Bloomdaddies (Criss Cross Jazz, 1996)
- Four Track Mind (Criss Cross Jazz, 1997)
- Stranger Things Have Happened (Fresh Sound, 1999)
- Sun Sol (Fresh Sound, 2000)
- Echonomics (Criss Cross Jazz, 2001)
- Live Au Cabaret (Effendi, 2001)
- Way Out Willy (Criss Cross Jazz, 2007) – rec. 2006
- Live in Italy (Jazz Eyes 2008)
- Bellwether (Criss Cross Jazz, 2009) – rec. 2008
- Live at Smalls (Smalls Live, 2010) – rec. 2009
- As You Like with BANN (Jazz Eyes 2010)
- Superconductor (5Passion 2015)
- Reeds Ramble with Chris Cheek (Criss Cross Jazz, 2014)
- Let's Call the Whole Thing Off with Chris Cheek (Criss Cross Jazz, 2016)
- New York Factor, Vol. 1 (Planck, 2022)
- moosejaww (Planck, 2022)
- Guardians of the Heart Machine (Whirlwind, 2019)
- Live at Smalls (Cellar Live, 2024)
- The Electrifying Seamus Blake - EH! ‘Plays the Music of Eddie Harris’ (Cellar Live, 2026)

=== Collaboration ===
With Sam Yahel, Ari Hoenig and Mike Moreno

- Jazz Side of the Moon (Chesky, 2008) – rec. 2007

=== As a member ===
Opus 5

- Introducing Opus 5 (Criss Cross, 2011)
- Pentasonic (Criss Cross, 2012)
- Progression (Criss Cross, 2014)
- Tickle (Criss Cross, 2015)
- Swing On This (Criss Cross, 2022)

=== As sideman ===
With Brazilian Girls

- Brazilian Girls (Verve Forecast, 2005)
- Lazy Lover (Verve Forecast, 2004)

With Lea DeLaria

- Play It Cool (Warner Bros., 2001)
- Double Standards (Telarc, 2003)
- House of David (Ghostlight, 2015)
- The Live (Smoke Sessions, 2008)

With Wycliffe Gordon

- Dig This! (Criss Cross Jazz, 2002)
- United Soul Experience (Criss Cross Jazz, 2002)

With Conrad Herwig

- Unseen Universe (Criss Cross Jazz, 2000)
- Obligation (Criss Cross Jazz, 2005)

With David Kikoski

- The Maze (Criss Cross Jazz, 1999)
- Combinations (Criss Cross Jazz, 2001)
- The Five (DIW, 2002)
- Limits (Criss Cross Jazz, 2006)

With Victor Lewis

- Eeeyyess! (Enja, 1997)
- Know It Today, Know It Tomorrow (Red, 1993)
- Three Way Conversations (Red, 1997)

With Monday Michiru

- Episodes in Color (SAR, 2002)
- Don't Disturb This Groove (Grand Gallery, 2011)
- Brasilified (Billboard, 2013)

With Mingus Big Band

- Blues & Politics (Dreyfus, 1999)
- I Am Three (Sunnyside/Sue Mingus, 2005)
- Live in Time (Dreyfus, 1996)
- Live in Tokyo (Sunnyside/Sue Mingus, 2006)
- Que Viva Mingus! (Dreyfus, 1997)
- Tonight at Noon... Three or Four Shades of Love (Dreyfus, 2002)

With Eric Reed

- 2011: The Baddest Monk (Savant, 2012)
- 2013: The Adventurous Monk (Savant, 2014)
- 2013: Groovewise (Smoke Sessions, 2014)

With Alex Sipiagin

- Mirrors (Criss Cross Jazz, 2003)
- Returning (Criss Cross Jazz, 2005)
- Mirages (Criss Cross Jazz, 2009)
- Live at Smalls (SmallsLIVE, 2013)
- From Reality and Back (5Passion 2013)

With Bill Stewart

- Telepathy (Blue Note, 1997)
- Space Squid (Pirouet, 2015)

With Jesse van Ruller

- Circles (Criss Cross Jazz, 2003)
- Views (Criss Cross Jazz, 2006)

With others

- Franco Ambrosetti, Live at the Blue Note (Enja, 1993)
- Diego Barber, 411 (Origin, 2013)
- Ronnie Blake, Assimilation (Hi Speed Horns, 2017)
- Erin Bode, Over and Over (Maxjazz, 2006)
- Monika Borzym, Girl Talk (Sony, 2011)
- Robi Botos, Movin' Forward (A440, 2015)
- Dave Douglas, Freak In (Bluebird, 2002)
- Billy Drummond, The Gift (Criss Cross, 1994)
- Fleurine, Fire (Coast to Coast 2002)
- Sara Gazarek, Return to You (Native Language, 2007)
- Danny Grissett, Form (Criss Cross Jazz, 2009)
- George Gruntz, Sins'n Wins'n Funs' Left-cores and Hard-core En-cores (TCB, 1996)
- Kevin Hays, Go Round (Blue Note, 1995)
- David Hazeltine, For All We Know (Smoke Sessions, 2014)
- Scott Kinsey, No Sleep (Kinesthetic Music, 2017)
- Jane Monheit, The Lovers, the Dreamers and Me (Concord, 2008)
- Josh Nelson, Let It Go (Omagatoki, 2007)
- Robert Sadin, Art of Love: Music of Machaut (Deutsche Grammophon, 2009)
- Antonio Sanchez, The Meridian Suite (CAM Jazz, 2015)
- Ken Schaphorst, Purple (Naxos, 1998)
- John Stetch, Carpatian Blues (Terra Nova, 1996)
- Helen Sung, Going Express (Sunnyside, 2011)
- Mark Turner, Yam Yam (Criss Cross Jazz, 1995)
- Manuel Valera, Forma Nueva (Mavo, 2004)
- Peter Zak, One Mind (Fresh Sound, 2018)
- Mark Zubek, Twentytwodollarfishlunch (Fresh Sound, 2009)
- Dan Costa (Composer), Skyness (Independent, 2020)
- Joel Haynes, The Return (Cellar Music 2023)
