= Gaudeamus Foundation =

Dutch music promoter

Gaudeamus
- Founded: 1945
- Headquarters: Loevenhoutsedijk 301 Utrecht,
- Website: gaudeamus.nl

The Gaudeamus Foundation and Contemporary Music Center organizes and promotes contemporary musical activities and concerts in the Netherlands and abroad. It focuses on supporting the career development of young composers and musicians, particularly Dutch, through its library facilities, contacts with international organizations, and its own activities. Gaudeamus was founded at Bilthoven, the Netherlands, in 1945 by Walter A. F. Maas, a Jewish immigrant from Mainz. It was originally headquartered in the Huize Gaudeamus, a villa built in the shape of a grand piano by the composer Julius Röntgen, also an immigrant from Germany but two generations older. Although in 2008 the Gaudeamus Foundation was incorporated into the Muziek Centrum Nederland, as from 2011 it continues to operate independently.

== Activities ==
- Gaudeamus International Composers Award, focuses on music by young composers and includes composers' competition.
- International Gaudeamus Interpreters Competition, for performers of contemporary music.
- The organisation of concerts throughout the cultural season.
- Library and documentation centre for contemporary music.
- Gaudeamus Information, newsletter.

== See also ==
- Donemus
