= Wessel Ilcken =

Wessel Ilcken (December 2, 1923 in Hilversum – July 13, 1957 in Loosdrecht) was a Dutch jazz drummer.

Ilcken lived in Paris in his youth, where he began to play drums and played in Piet van Dijk's band. In 1945, he married singer Rita Reys, and led his own group from 1950, touring widely throughout western Europe. He played extensively on the Dutch jazz scene, including on the albums Jazz Behind the Dikes (1955–56), and worked with the American musicians Joe Carroll, Bob Cooper, Dizzy Gillespie, Stan Kenton, and Herbie Mann, as well as the Swedish Lars Gullin. He died in a car crash in 1957.

In 1963, the Wessel Ilcken Prijs for Dutch jazz musicians was instituted in his honor; this later became known as the Boy Edgar Prijs, in honor of Boy Edgar.
