= Fleurine =

Dutch jazz vocalist

- Born: Fleurine Verloop; April 3, 1969 (age 57); Netherlands
- Genres: Jazz
- Occupation: Singer
- Instrument: Guitar
- Years active: 1990–present
- Labels: EmArcy, Sunnyside
- Website: fleurine.com

Fleurine Verloop, known professionally as Fleurine, is a Dutch jazz vocalist.

== Biography ==
Fleurine studied at the Amsterdam School of High Arts Conservatory and then moved to New York. Beginning in the 1990s she has lived and worked in the Netherlands and the United States. She performed at the North Sea Jazz Festival with her band Fleurine plus Five in 1994, 1995, 1996, 1997, 2000, 2004 and 2019.

In 1996 she was invited as a guest vocalist with the Roy Hargrove Quintet at the Havana Jazz Festival in Cuba. During a worldwide festival tour promoting her debut album in 1997, she met pianist Brad Mehldau, who was promoting his first album as a leader. Their bands were booked at the same festivals that summer: Festival International de Montreal (Fleurine played at the Spectrum sharing a double bill with Patricia Barber) and Umbria Jazz Festival in Italy (with T.S Monk band's and as a guest Brad Mehldau). This led to New York concerts for the pair and concerts around the world in Los Angeles, Brazil, London, Paris, Brussels, Dublin, and Berlin. They married and had three children.

Her first album was Meant to Be! for EmArcy in 1995. This album was produced by Don Sickler and recorded by Rudy Van Gelder in New York City. Fleurine wrote lyrics to 12 of the 13 songs of with compositions by Thelonious Monk, Kenny Dorham, Tom Harrell, Joshua Redman, and Jose Lopretti. She was accompanied by Renee Rosnes on piano, Christian McBride on double bass, and Billy Drummond on drums with guests Tom Harrell on trumpet, Bobby Porcelli on alto saxophone, Ralph Moore on tenor saxophone, and Jesse van Ruller on guitar.

Her second album for EmArcy, Close Enough for Love, was recorded in June 1999 with Brad Mehldau. Fleurine wrote Portuguese lyrics for Mehldau's music and English lyrics for Pat Metheny's song "Better Days Ahead". Mehldau wrote string arrangements for some of the songs.

Fire was released in 2003. With pop songs arranged by Fleurine, she was accompanied by Mehldau, Jeff Ballard, Seamus Blake, Jesse van Ruller, and Peter Bernstein. The album was produced by Robert Sadin.

Sunnyside released her album San Francisco in 2008. The album concentrated on Brazilian music, with songs by Antonio Carlos Jobim, Chico Buarque, Francis Hime, and Chico Pinheiro. On Brazilian Dream she recorded with a Brazilian band that included Vitor Goncalves, Ian Faquini, Chico Pinheiro, Eduardo Belo, and Rogerio Boccato with guests Mehldau and Chris Potter. Fleurine played guitar on some songs, composed most of the music, and wrote lyrics in English and Portuguese.

== Awards and honors ==
Fleurine's album Brazilian Dream, for which she composed the majority of the material and wrote all the lyrics, was nominated for an Edison Award. In October 2019 she received an "Overdue Ovation" from Jazztimes magazine.

== Discography ==
- Meant to Be! (EmArcy, 1995)
- Close Enough for Love (EmArcy, 2000)
- Fire (Coast to Coast, 2002)
- San Francisco (Sunnyside, 2008)
- Brazilian Dream (Sunnyside, 2019)
