= Muziek Centrum Nederland =

- Formation: January 1, 2008; 18 years ago
- Purpose: Promotion of Dutch music
- Headquarters: Amsterdam
- Location: Rokin
- Website: http://www.muziekcentrumnederland.nl

Music Center the Netherlands (MCN) is an organization that promotes and archives Dutch professional music. It aims to strengthen the position of Dutch music and music culture in the Netherlands and abroad. It organizes events and informative meetings, workshops, and courses; publishes promotional CDs; and attends international music fairs and conventions. It is financially supported by the Dutch government.

The establishment of a national organization for Dutch music was a wish of the 2007 government, and it led to MCN's establishment on 1 January 2008. The organization has its headquarters on the Rokin in Amsterdam. It is a merger of seven music institutes: Donemus (documentation center for classical music), Gaudeamus (center for contemporary music), De Kamervraag (center for classical music), Dutch Jazz Organisation, the Dutch Jazz Service, the Netherlands Jazz Archive, and the Dutch Rock and Pop Institute.

One of the organization's online publications is the Muziekencyclopedie, an encyclopedia of Dutch bands and artists. In 2009, it helped establish an endowed chair for Jazz and Improvisational Music at the University of Amsterdam.

== Activities ==
- Gaudeamus International Composers Award
- Gaudeamus International Interpreters Award
- Chamber Music Day
- VPRO/Boy Edgar Award
- Dutch Jazz Meeting
- Dutch Blend Meeting
- MusicXport.nl
- Pop Media Prijs
- promotional support at international music conventions such as CMJ (New York), SXSW (Austin, Texas), Popkomm (Berlin) and Musikmesse (Frankfurt am Main, Germany)
