= Jesse van Ruller =

Dutch guitarist and composer

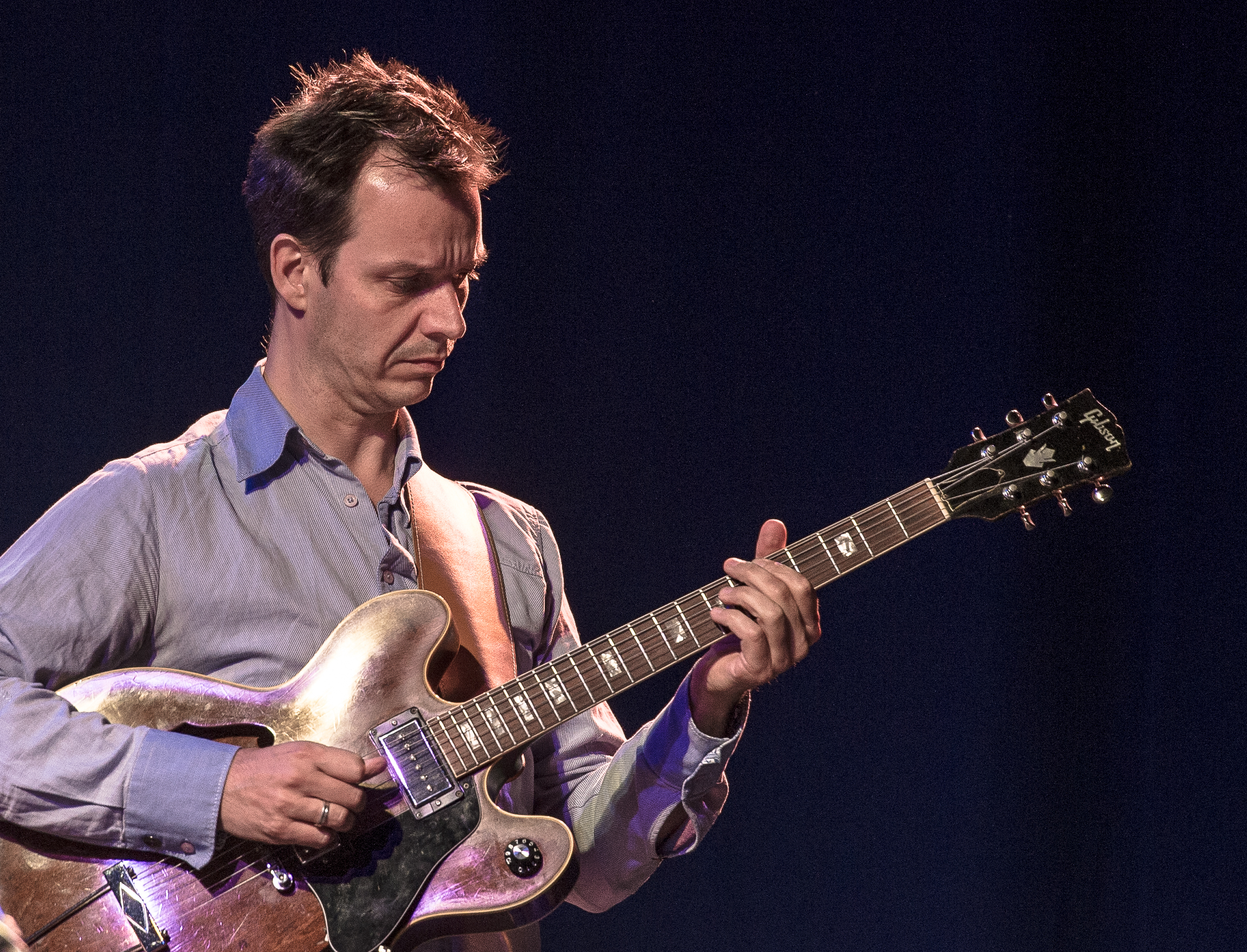

Background information
- Born: Jesse van Ruller; 21 January 1972 (age 54); Amsterdam, Netherlands
- Genre: Jazz
- Occupations: Musician, composer
- Instrument: Guitar

Jesse van Ruller (born 21 January 1972) is a Dutch jazz guitarist and composer. He won the Thelonious Monk International Jazz Guitar Competition in 1995 and has recorded several albums as a leader and more as a sideman.

== Early life ==
Van Ruller was born in Amsterdam on 21 January 1972. He started playing the guitar at the age of seven. "He continued his studies at Miami University, Ohio (MM 1995), and in 1995 won the Thelonious Monk International Jazz Guitar Competition in Washington, DC."

== Later life and career ==
Van Ruller recorded two quintet albums for Bluemusic: European Quintet in 1996 and Herbs, Fruits, Balms and Spices two years later. He went on to record three albums for Criss Cross Jazz. These were Here and There and Circles in 2002, and Views in 2005. The guitarist composed almost all of the pieces played on the last two.

== Discography ==
=== As leader ===
Year recorded	Title	Label	Year released	Notes
1996	European Quintet	Bluemusic	1997	Quintet
1998	Herbs, Fruits, Balms and Spices	Bluemusic	1998	Quintet
2001	Here and There	Criss Cross Jazz	2002	Some tracks quartet, with David Hazeltine (piano), Nat Reeves (bass), Joe Farnsworth (drums); some tracks trio, with Frans Van Geest (bass), Willie Jones III (drums)
2002	Circles	Criss Cross Jazz	2003	Quartet, with Seamus Blake (tenor sax), Sam Yahel (organ), Bill Stewart (drums)
2004	Live at Murphy's Law	55	2004	Live. Trio, with Joost van Schaik (drums) and Frans Van Der Hoeven (bass).
2005	Views	Criss Cross Jazz	2006	Quartet, with Seamus Blake (tenor sax), Sam Yahel (organ), Bill Stewart (drums)
2021?	Spirits High	self-released	2021	With Maarten Hogenhuis

=== As sideman ===
Year recorded	Leader	Title	Label	Year released
1999	Benjamin Herman	Get In	Challenge	1999
2001	David Hazeltine	Good-Hearted People	Criss Cross	2001
2001	Clarence Penn	Play-Penn	Criss Cross]	2001
2002?	Fleurine	Fire	Coast to Coast	2002
2002	John Swana	On Target	Criss Cross	2003
2005?	Pete Philly and Perquisite	Mindstate	Anti-	2005
2009?	Benjamin Herman	Blue Sky Blond	Dox	2009
2010?	Dave Liebman	Lieb Plays Weill	Daybreak-Challenge	2010
2011	Ramón Valle	Flashes from Holland	RVS	2011
2012?	Benjamin Herman	Deal	Dox	2012
2013?	Florian Ross	Wheel & Wires	Fuhrwerk	2013
2019?	Jasper Blom	Polyphony	Whirlwind	2019
