= Jan Laurens Hartong =

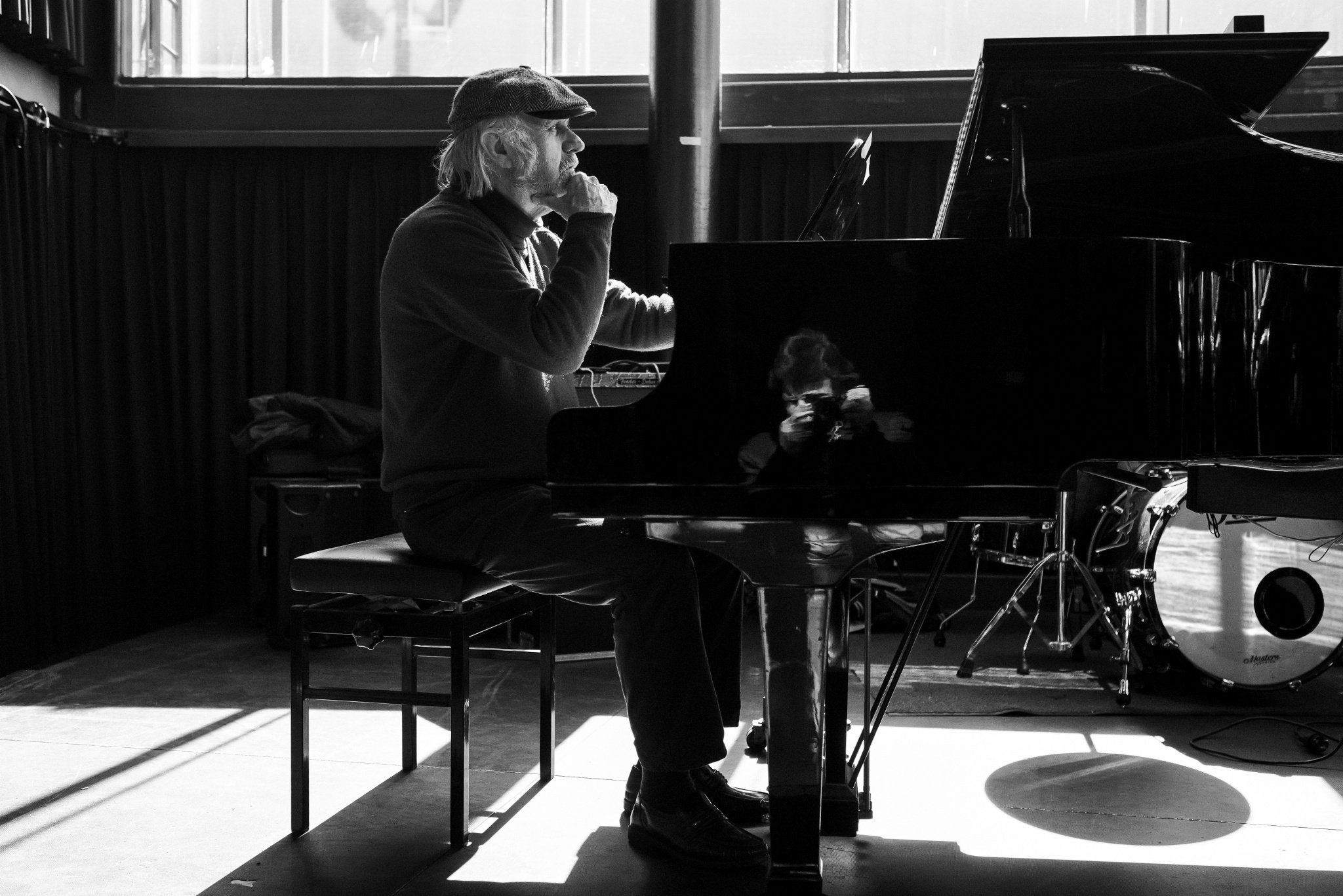
- Jan Laurens Hartong at CODARTS

Background information
- Born: 5 November 1941; Amersfoort, Netherlands
- Died: 1 May 2016 (aged 74) Rotterdam, Netherlands
- Genres: Latin jazz, Jazz
- Instrument: Piano
- Years active: 1957–2016
- Labels: Timeless Records, Lucho, Azucar, Munich records, Borderless Productions, World Pacific/Blue Note, Maxanter Music Prod, EMI

Jan Laurens Hartong (1941 – 2016). was a Dutch pianist, composer, arranger, teacher, founder and bandleader of Nueva Manteca. Hartong was a pioneer of the Dutch Latin jazz scene, he was also a musicologist and author.

== Biography ==
=== Youth ===
Hartong was born on the 5th of November 1941 in Amersfoort. With his father he went to concerts by Duke Ellington, Oscar Peterson and Erroll Garner. His aunt Corrie Hartong knew the mother of Pim Jacobs and arranged that Hartong got piano lessons from him. Led by Pim Jacobs, he discovered the secrets of Modern Jazz. His idols were Wynton Kelly, Les McCann and Ahmad Jamal.

In his youth he first came into contact with Latin American music. "I was about twelve years old, I played quite a bit of piano and loved bebop. One day my brother came with a Cuban lp by Cal Tjader. When I heard that, I was sold."

As a 16-year-old, he founded a jazz trio with Ruud Jacobs on bass and Cees See, later Han Bennink on drums. They performed a lot, including in the jazz cellar Persepolis in Utrecht and De Benelux in Hilversum.

After his high school, Hartong opted for a career in music.

=== 1960–1969 ===
From 1962 to 1964 Hartong studied classical piano at the conservatory in Utrecht, where he was taught by Sas Bunge. Hartong then left for Salzburg to continue his classical piano studies at the Mozarteum Academy, where he graduated in 1967. In Salzburg he met his wife, the Egyptian-Swiss opera singer Diana Zaki, with whom he gave classical recitals together. In 1966 Hartong participated in the International Competition for Modern jazz in Vienna and came through to the final with Loek Dikker, Fritz Pauer, Joachim Kühn and the final winner Jan Hammer. He received a medal from Cannonball Adderley for this achievement.

=== 1970–1979 ===
In 1974, Hartong began studying musicology at the universities of Utrecht and Amsterdam. With his graduation, he became the first doctoral candidate in ethnomusicology in the Netherlands. From 1975 to 1980, Hartong was attached to the Royal Tropical Institute in Amsterdam as deputy curator of the Music Department. Hartong organized, together with Edy Martinez and Tito Puente, concerts and workshops for the Tropical Institute.

=== 1980–1989 ===
In 1980, Rob Madna asked Hartong to put Latin jazz on the Rotterdam Conservatoire agenda. A year later Frans Elsen asked him for the Royal Conservatory in The Hague and Eri Youssouf approached him for the jazz academy in Hilversum. In 1982 Hartong founded the band Manteca with a typical salsa repertoire with which they performed at parties in Dutch and German clubs. In 1984 and 1987 Hartong went to Cuba to study local music there. After his second visit to Cuba he decided to radically change direction. The name of the band was changed to Nueva Manteca and it became an instrumental Latin jazz band.

Hartong: "It is my goal to make full concert music. Nueva Manteca must be an experimental band. We no longer play covers, but only our own compositions and arrangements. We are looking for a mix of jazz and Latin.

=== 1990–1999 ===
In 1990, together with the musicologist Joep Bor, Hartong founded the World Music department of the Rotterdam Conservatory (CODARTS). Until his death Hartong stayed connected to this training.

With Nueva Manteca, Hartong released three studio albums in the early 90s: Afrodisia with, among others, the Alborada composed by Hartong in 1991, which received good reviews and set the band at the forefront of Europeans Afro-Cuban jazz bands. Bluesongo with, among others, the Bluesongo composed by Hartong in 1994. In the same year their instrumental Latin-jazz version of Porgy & Bess also came out. His composition Something in Blue ended up on the 1994 Double Dutch album of the Ben van den Dungen/Jarmo Hoogendijk Quintet (both of whom were band members of Nueva Manteca at the time). In 1994 Hartong played with Nueva Manteca at the KLM Jazz Festival in Curaçao, Euro Jazz Night, the International Music Festival in Leeds and for the first time at the North Sea Jazz Festival, where the band performed 4 times over the years. In 1994 Hartong played with Nueva Manteca in Nick Vollebregt's Jazz Café in Laren. A recording was made of this concert, which was released on CD under the title Live At Nick Vollebregt's Jazz Cafe.

The American record boss Bruce Lundval heard the band play in the Netherlands and decided to release the album Let's Face The Music And Dance with Nueva Manteca. Hartong's arrangement of Miles Davis's composition All Blues stood high on the charts of several Latin-Radio DJs in the United States for months. Max Salazar considers the song one of the all-time outstanding Latin jazz recordings. Latin Beat Magazine called it a great CD and by far the best effort to date from Europe's #1 Latin jazz ensemble.

In 1997 the world premiere of Hartong's religious composition Afro Cuban Sanctus took place during the Musica Sacra Festival in Maastricht. In 1998 the band released the studio album Nightpeople with, among other things, the Nightpeople composed by Hartong.

=== 2000–2010 ===
With Nueva Manteca, in 2002, Hartong released the studio album Congo Square: Tribute to New Orleans and in 2003 Latin tribute to West Side Story

In 2005 he started the jazz trio Alliance with Peter Ypma (drums) and Marius Beets (bass). They released the album Trio Alliance – Standards Straight Ahead, with live recordings and new studio recordings.

In 2006 he published his book Musical Terms Worldwide, in which musical terms and essays on Western and non-Western musical traditions can be found.

=== 2011–2016 ===
In 2011, a second religious composition by Hartong, Requiem para el Mundo, was performed in Israel on his seventieth birthday with the Israeli vocal group The Vocal Octet. In 2013, Hartong released the live album Live 25 Years – Nueva Manteca with Nueva Manteca. As a result, Hartong wrote the following:

"The primary mission of Nueva Manteca is to further develop and strengthen its own artistic signature, to break through conventions, and to continue to make a substantial contribution to the development of the Latin jazz idiom worldwide and in the Netherlands in particular. Since its founding in 1987, exactly 25 years ago, Nueva Manteca has been distinctive from the outset and has become an internationally acclaimed institution with a clear position in talent development. Young talents regularly get opportunities from the band to gain practical experience at home and abroad."

In 2015, Hartong and Nueva Manteca release the latest live album Crime!, including Ciao City composed by Hartong.

== Discography ==
=== Albums with Nueva Manteca ===
- Varadero Blues (1989)
- Afrodisia (1991)
- Bluesongo (1994)
- Porgy & Bess (1994)
- Live At Nick Vollebregt's Jazz Cafe (1994)
- Let's Face The Music And Dance (1996)
- Afro Cuban Sanctus (1997)
- Nightpeople (1998)
- Congo Square: Tribute to New Orleans (2002)
- Latin tribute to West Side Story (2003)
- Live 25 Years – Nueva Manteca (2013)
- Crime! (Live) (2015)

=== Album with Trio Alliance ===
- Standards Straight Ahead (2005)

== Bibliography ==
- Musical terms worldwide (2006)
