= Wim Overgaauw =

Dutch jazz guitarist

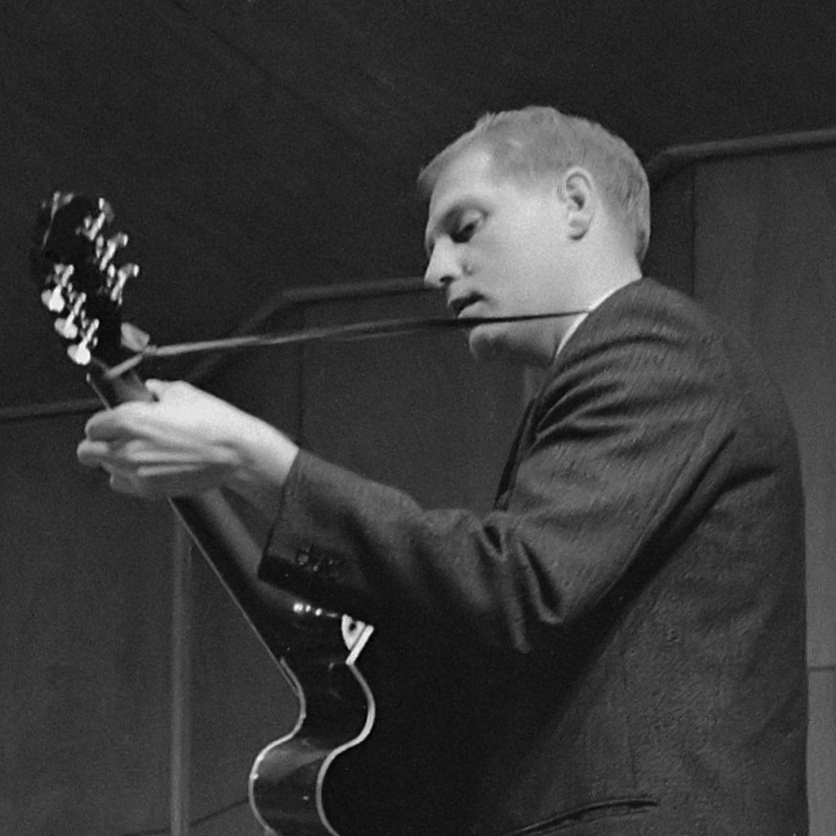
- Wim Overgaauw in 1960

Background information
- Born: November 23, 1929; Hilversum, Netherlands
- Died: November 30, 1995 (aged 66) Hilversum
- Genres: Jazz, easy listening
- Occupations: Musician, teacher
- Instrument: Guitar

Wim Overgaauw (23 November 1929 – 30 November 1995) was a Dutch jazz guitarist.

After trying the violin, he switched to guitar and became a self-taught guitarist. He worked for American forces in Germany, toured the Netherlands with pianist Pim Jacobs and singer Rita Reys, and became a studio musician and guitar teacher in Hilversum. He showed little interest in the business aspects of the music industry. The few albums he recorded as a leader are largely in the genre of easy listening. Blue Jack Jazz Records posthumously released some of his jazz concerts on CD. His playing also lives on in students he taught at the Hilversum Conservatory, such as Jesse van Ruller, Martijn van Iterson, and Maarten van der Grinten.
