= Nobody's Tune =

Studio album by Wouter Hamel
- Released: 29 January 2009
- Genre: Jazz
- Length: 41:00
- Language: English
- Label: Dox Records
- Producer: Benny Sings

Professional ratings
Review scores
Source	Rating
Jazz and Soul	(positive)

Nobody's Tune is the second studio album by Dutch jazz singer Wouter Hamel. The song See You Once Again was used in an advertisement for the BBC iPlayer.

== Track listing ==
1. One More Time On The Merry Go-Around
2. Big Blue Sea
3. When Morning Comes
4. In Between
5. Nobody’S Tune
6. Sir Henry
7. March, April, May
8. Quite The Disguise
9. Once In A Lifetime
10. Tiny Town
11. See You Once Again
12. Amsterdam

=== Bonus tracks ===
13. Slow And Blue
14. Adore
15. Late At Night
16. A Distant Melody (Live @ Home)
17. Nothing's Any Good(Live @ Home)
18. Breezy (Live @ Home)

== Charts ==
=== Weekly charts ===
Chart (2009)	Peak position
Dutch Albums (Album Top 100)	4

=== Year-end charts ===
Chart (2009)	Position
Dutch Albums (Album Top 100)	41
