= San Francisco (Fleurine album) =

Studio album by Fleurine
- Released: February 12, 2008
- Genre: Jazz
- Label: Sunnyside

San Francisco is an album by vocalist Fleurine.

== Background ==
Fleurine's previous recordings had contained ballads, jazz standards, and jazz interpretations of pop music.

== Music and recording ==
This album focuses on Brazilian music, "including the songs of Chico Buarque, Chico Pinheiro, and Francis Hime plus a lone number ('Memories in Black and White') from Antonio Carlos Jobim". The lyrics are in English or Portuguese.

The album was released by Sunnyside Records on February 12, 2008.

== Reception ==
Professional ratings
Review scores
Source	Rating
AllMusic	4/5 stars

Scott Yanow concluded that "San Francisco is a program of subtle music that is quietly infectious." The JazzTimes reviewer commented that "the results are nothing short of splendiferous". Downbeat Magazine's Fred Bouchard wrote in their May 2008 issue: "Brazilian chic has nudged its way for two generations into pop and jazz, but few insinuate as distinctively candid and original an interpretation as does vocalist Fleurine on this samba set. Her tender, personal, smile-through-the-tears lyrics- some in Portuguese, some her translations from Portuguese or original English lyric- come through on this set of pretty, haunting tunes. The Dutch born, Portugal-reared polyglot sounds as fresh and guileless as she did on her slightly more mainstream 1995 debut. Lilting tunes fly feather-light in fittingly bare-bones combos, with fleet cameos by husband Brad Mehldau."

== Track listing ==
1. "Love Marks" – 5:08 Music by Francis Hime, English lyrics by Fleurine adapted from the original Portuguese
2. "E Se" – 3:34 Music by Francis Hime
3. "Tatuegem" – 3:40 Music by Chico Buarque, lyrics by Ruy Guerra
4. "Memories In Black and White" – 3:44 Music by Jobim, English lyrics by Fleurine
5. "Encontro" – 3:50 Music & Lyrics by Chico Pinheiro
6. "Anoiteceu" – 5:16 Music by Francis Hime, Lyrics by Vinicius de Moraes
7. "The Roses" – 6:17 Music by Chico Pinheiro, Lyrics by Fleurine
8. "Behind Close Doors" – 3:19 Music by Francis Hime, Lyrics by Fleurine adapted from the original Portuguese
9. "Tempestade" – 3:59 Music by Chico Pinheiro, Lyrics by Chico Cesar
10. "Spring-Buds Through the Snow" – 5:25 Music by Chico Pinheiro, Lyrics by Fleurine
11. "Passagem" – 4:02 Music by Chico Pinheiro

== Personnel ==
- Fleurine – vocals
- Chris Potter – tenor saxophone, bass clarinet, alto flute (tracks 3, 4, 9)
- Brad Mehldau – piano (tracks 1, 7, 10)
- Chico Pinheiro – guitar (tracks 2, 5, 6, 7, 9, 11)
- Freddie Bryant – guitar (tracks 2, 3, 4, 5, 6, 8)
- Doug Weiss – bass (tracks 1, 2, 3, 5, 7, 9, 11)
- Erik Friedlander - cello (tracks 6, 11)
- Gilad – percussion (tracks 1, 2, 3, 5, 7, 9, 11)
