= Art of Love: Music of Machaut =

Studio album by Robert Sadin
- Released: September 1, 2009
- Length: 52:12
- Label: Deutsche Grammophon
- Producer: Robert Sadin

Art of Love: Music of Machaut is an album by Robert Sadin, released in 2009.

== Music and recording ==
Sadin "conceived, produced, and served as mixer for the album, arranged the music and texts of the songs by Guillaume de Machaut, as well as singing and playing clarinet and organ on some of the tracks." Each of the tracks is partly improvised. Two tracks are by different composers: "Brad's Interlude" by Brad Mehldau and "Evocation" by Milton Nascimento.

The album was released by Deutsche Grammophon on September 1, 2009.

== Reception ==
The AllMusic reviewer concluded that "Deutsche Grammophon's sound is immaculate with a warm intimacy. This beautifully executed CD should appeal to fans of jazz/classical crossover."

== Track listing ==
1. "Song of the Dawn" – 5:11
2. "Douce Dame" – 3:22
3. "Natalie's Song" – 3:36
4. "Python" – 5:00
5. "Amour me fait désirer" – 5:12
6. "Tu, meu sonho vivo" – 5:39
7. "Comment" – 5:32
8. "Brad's Interlude" – 1:17
9. "Dame, si vous m'êtes lointaine" – 5:04
10. "Force of Love" – 4:04
11. "Doux visage" – 3:29
12. "Hélas" – 3:35
13. "Evocation" – 1:11
