= VPRO/Boy Edgar Award =

The VPRO/Boy Edgar Award, is an annual award given to a Dutch jazz musician, composer, or bandleader. The individual must have made significant contributions to the Dutch jazz scene over a significant period of time. The award is a sculpture by Dutch fine artist Jan Wolkers, and a cash prize of 12,500 euros. It is widely regarded as the Netherlands' most prestigious and honorable jazz award. The award is given under the auspicies of the VPRO and Music Center the Netherlands.

The prize was inaugurated in 1963 as the Wessel Ilcken Prijs, named after drummer Wessel Ilcken; in 1980 it was renamed the Boy Edgar Prijs, after Boy Edgar. VPRO linked its name to the prize in 1992.

== Winners ==
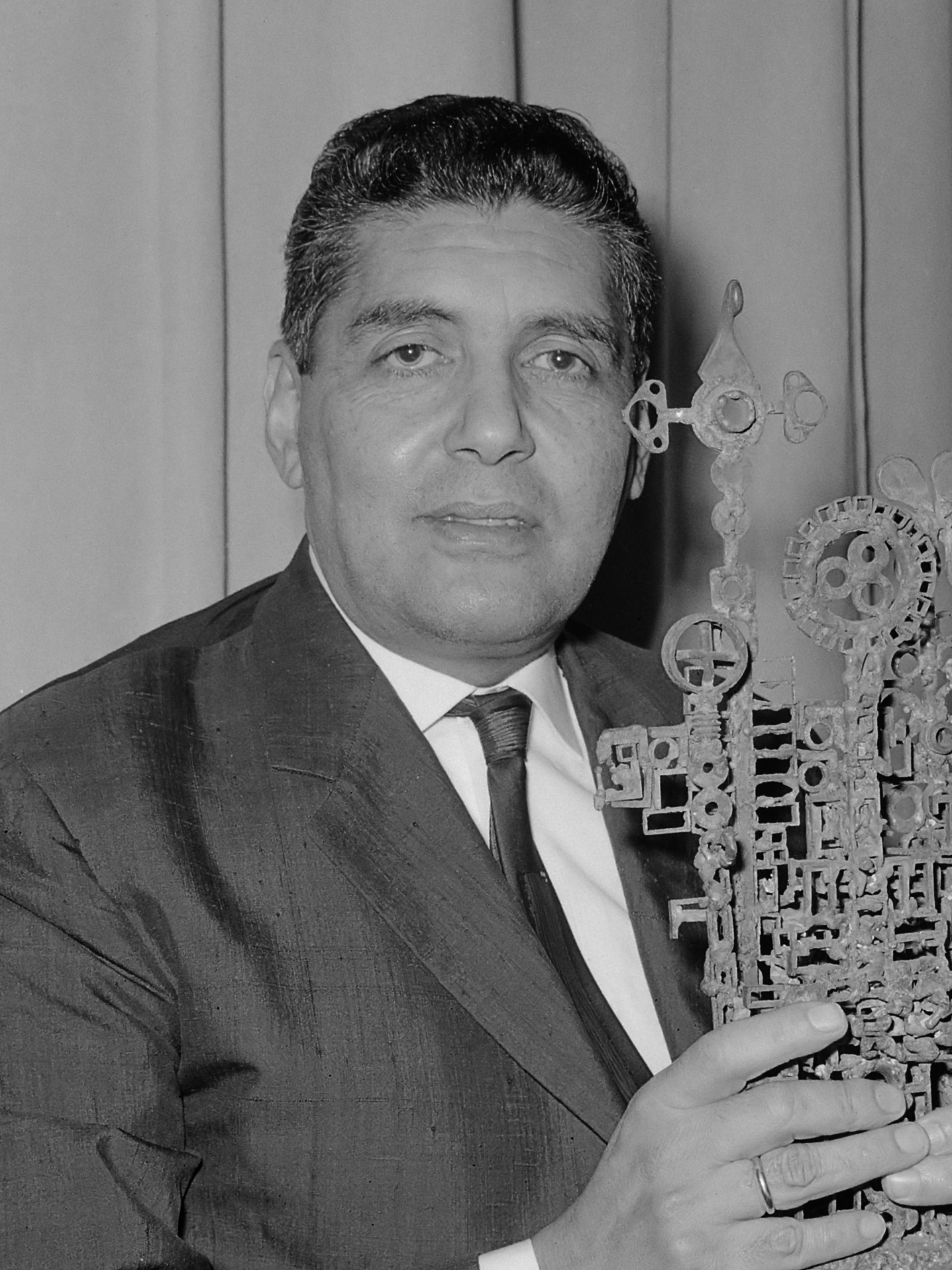
1964: Boy Edgar

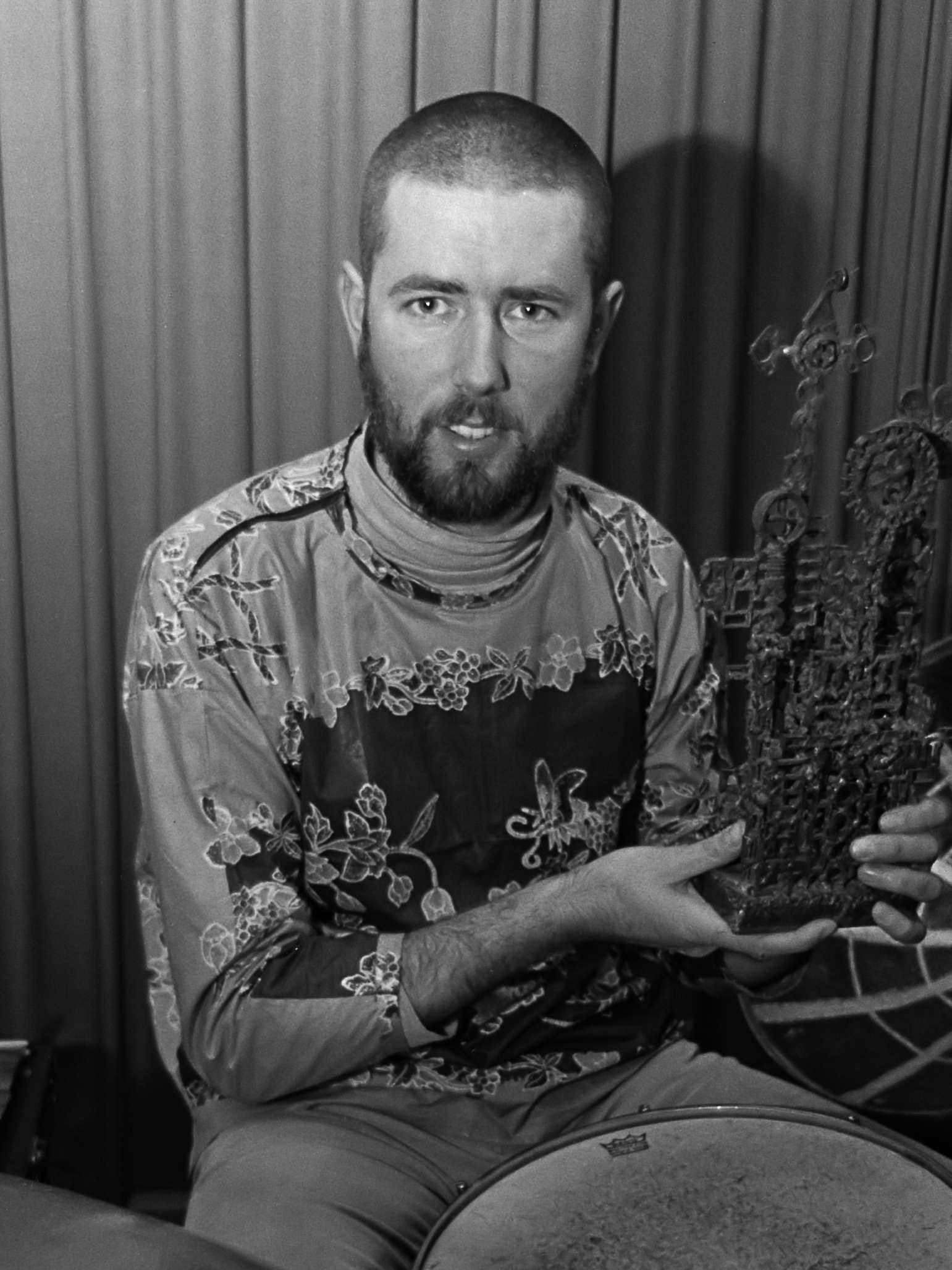
1967: Han Bennink

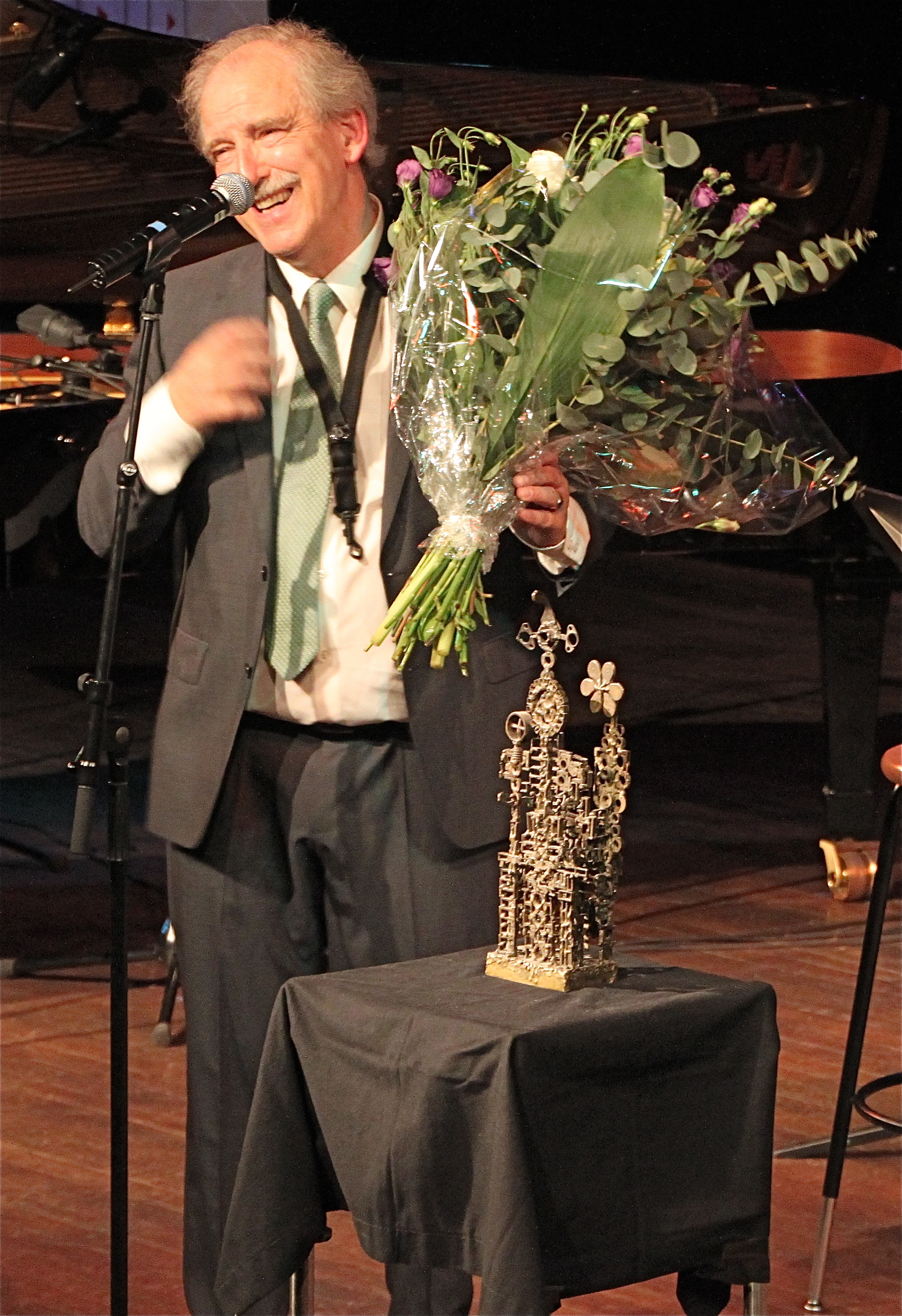
2011: Ferdinand Povel

- 1963 Herman Schoonderwalt
- 1964 Boy Edgar
- 1965 Piet Noordijk
- 1966 Misha Mengelberg
- 1967 Han Bennink
- 1968 Harry Verbeke
- 1969 Hans Dulfer
- 1970 Willem Breuker
- 1971 Gijs Hendriks
- 1972 Kees Hazevoet
- 1973 Leo Cuypers
- 1974 Orkest De Boventoon
- 1975 Ohm
- 1976/1977 (not awarded)
- 1978 Stichting Claxon Maarten Altena and Michel Waisvisz
- 1979 Theo Loevendie
- 1980 Rein de Graaff
- 1981 Guus Janssen
- 1982 Alan Laurillard
- 1983 Nedly Elstak
- 1984 Martin van Duynhoven
- 1985 Ernst Reijseger
- 1986 Michael Moore
- 1987 J.C. Tans
- 1988 John Engels Drums
- 1989 Ab Baars
- 1990 Greetje Bijma
- 1991 (not awarded)
- 1992 Willem van Manen
- 1993 Willem Breuker
- 1994 Franky Douglas
- 1995 Wolter Wierbos
- 1996/97 Michiel Braam
- 1997/98 Corrie van Binsbergen
- 1998/99 Paul van Kemenade
- 2000 Sean Bergin
- 2001 Eric Vloeimans
- 2002 Tony Overwater
- 2003 Tobias Delius
- 2004 Luc Houtkamp
- 2006 Benjamin Herman
- 2007 Bert van den Brink
- 2008 Pierre Courbois
- 2009 Ernst Glerum
- 2010 Anton Goudsmit
- 2011 Ferdinand Povel
- 2012 Yuri Honing
- 2013 Oene van Geel
- 2014 Jeroen van Vliet
- 2015 Tineke Postma
- 2016 Wilbert de Joode
