= Robert Sadin =

American jazz musician

Robert Sadin is an American jazz musician, conductor, arranger, composer and producer. He was conductor of the Lincoln Center Jazz Orchestra.

== Discography ==
=== As leader ===
- Art of Love: Music of Machaut (Deutsche Grammophon, 2009)

=== As producer ===
- Kathleen Battle, So Many Stars (Sony Classical, 1995)
- Kathleen Battle, Grace (Sony Classical, 1997)
- Samuel Blaser, Consort in Motion (Kind of Blue, 2011)
- Dee Dee Bridgewater and Hollywood Bowl Orchestra, Prelude to a Kiss (Philips, 1996)
- The Clark Sisters, Conqueror (Rejoice/A&M, 1988)
- Placido Domingo, Encanto del Mar (Sony Classical, 2014)
- Fleurine, Fire (Coast to Coast, 2002)
- Herbie Hancock, Gershwin's World (Verve, 1998)
- Tom Harrell, First Impressions (HighNote, 2015)
- Igor Lumpert, Eleven (Clean Feed, 2018)
- New York Voices, Hearts of Fire (GRP, 1991)
- Jacques Schwarz-Bart, Sone Ka-La (EmArcy, 2006)
- Wayne Shorter, Alegria (Verve, 2003)
- Sting, If on a Winter's Night (Cherrytree/Deutsche Grammophon, 2009)
