= Challenge Records (1994) =

Dutch record label founded in 1994

- Founded: 1994
- Founder: Hein van de Geyn; Anne de Jong; Joost Leijen
- Distributor: Challenge Records International
- Genre: Jazz, classical
- Country of origin: Netherlands
- Location: Amersfoort
- Official website: challengerecords.com

Challenge Records is a record company and label in the Netherlands founded by Hein van de Geyn, Anne de Jong, and Joost Leijen in 1994. Its catalogue includes music by Nat Adderley, Paul Bollenback, Bob Brookmeyer, Keith Ingham, Rick Margitza, Enrico Pieranunzi, Yitzhak Yedid, Clark Terry, Jasper van 't Hof, Eric Ineke and Eric Vloeimans.

== Imprints ==
Challenge's labels include Buzz, Between The Lines, Challenge Classics, Challenge Jazz Records, V-Flow, Double Moon (producer Volker Dueck), Challenge Jazz (producer Hein van de Geyn), Challenge Legacy, Retrieval (restorations by John R. T. Davies), Daybreak (producer Fred Dubiez), Timeless Jazz Legacy, A Records, JJ-Tracks, PineHill, Van Dyck Records, Supertracks Records, Drukplaten, Fineline, SunnyMoon Records, and Antoine Marchand.

Challenge also distributes many independent Dutch and German jazz labels.

== See also ==
- List of record labels
