= Wouter Hamel =

Dutch singer

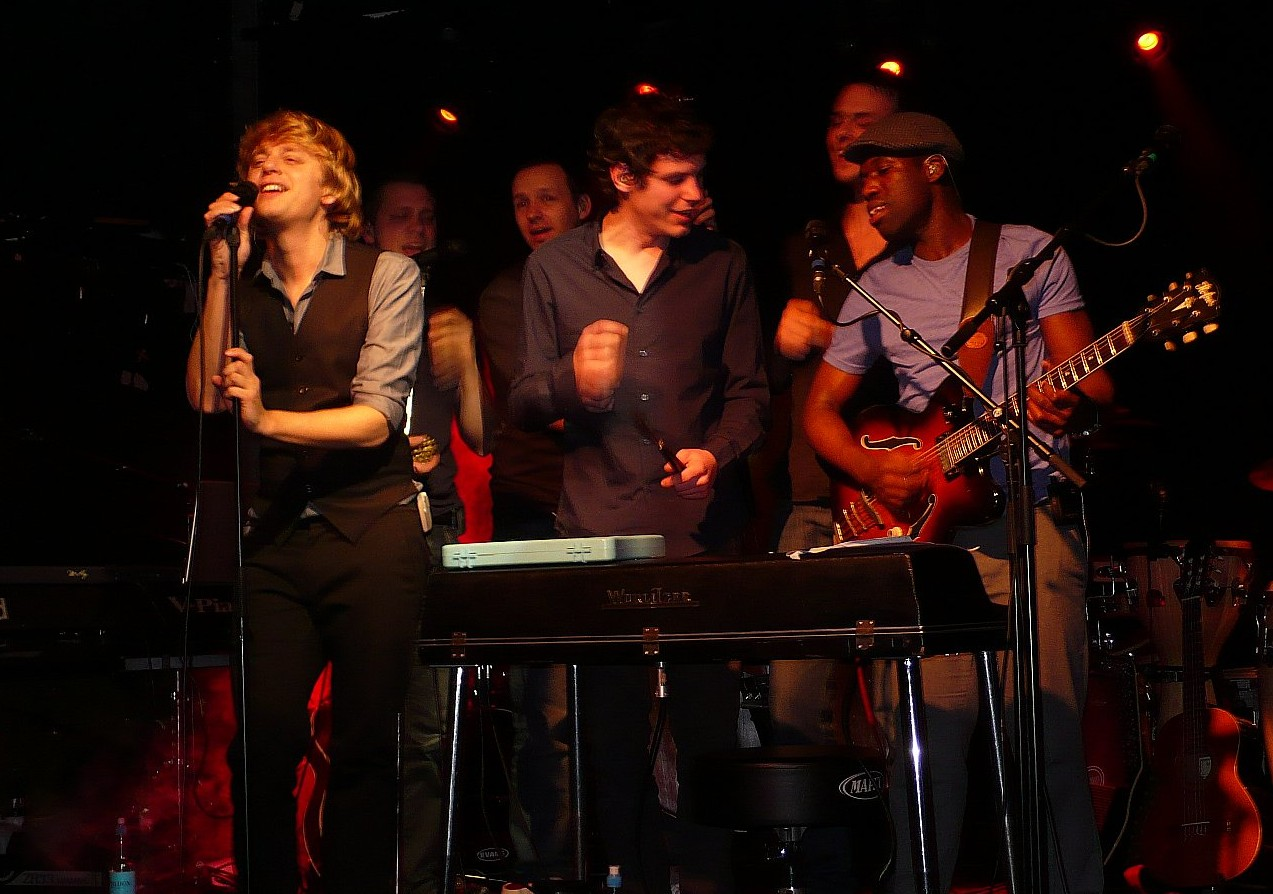
- Hamel and his band at The Thekla - 4 February 2010

Background information
- Born: 19 May 1977 (age 49)
- Origin: The Hague, Netherlands
- Genres: Pop
- Instruments: Vocals, guitar
- Years active: 2005–present
- Label: Dox
- Website: www.wouterhamel.nl

Wouter Hamel (born 1977) is a Dutch pop singer. He released his debut album Hamel in March 2007. Hamel's style has been compared to Jamie Cullum's.

== Biography ==
After winning the Dutch Jazz Vocal Competition in 2005, Hamel received significant attention from the Dutch media. He has since performed on several television shows and on the internationally-known North Sea Jazz Festival. His debut album, for which he wrote all of the twelve songs, was released to critical acclaim. It peaked at #40 on the Dutch Albums Top 100. Hamel also released the song "Breezy" as a single in Japan, where it reached #36 on the Tokio Hot 100 chart.

In 2011, Hamel released his third album Lohengrin and also supported Caro Emerald on her tour in Germany.

"Breezy" (2007)
A 22 second sample of "Breezy" by Wouter Hamel, from the album Hamel.

== Discography ==
=== Studio albums ===
Title	Album details	Peak chart positions			
Title	Album details	NL	BEL (FLA)	JPN	KOR
Hamel	Released: 25 February 2007; Label: Dox Records	13	—	149	—
Nobody's Tune	Released: 29 January 2009; Label: Dox Records	4	—	175	72
Lohengrin	Released: 22 September 2011; Label: Dox Records	6	—	—	47
Pompadour	Released: 11 April 2014; Label: Dox Records	16	—	255	—
Amaury	Released: 5 April 2017; Label: Dox Records	37	190	—	—
Boystown	Released: 3 May 2019; Label: Dox Records	—	—	—	—
