= Close Enough for Love (Fleurine album) =

Studio album by Fleurine
- Released: 2000
- Recorded: June 24–25, 1999
- Genre: Jazz
- Label: EmArcy

Close Enough for Love is the second album by vocalist Fleurine.

== Background ==
John Fordham wrote that "The pairing of the young Dutch vocalist Fleurine and American pianist Brad Mehldau (the most acclaimed jazz pianist of the last decade) seemed an unlikely one. [...] Mehldau was the quintessential contemporary jazz heavyweight, a meditative chamber musician of immense sophistication. Fleurine was the photogenic, standards-singing, multilingual, smooth-jazz singer."

== Music, recording and reception ==
The album was recorded at Sear Sound in New York City on June 24 and 25, 1999. The tracks include compositions by Mehldau and Pat Metheny with lyrics by Fleurine in Portuguese and English and an original composition by Fleurine; it also features tracks by Antonio Carlos Jobim, Jimi Hendrix and Supertramp. Fordham wrote that the album "has plenty of unexpected diversions".

== Track listing ==
1. "The Logical Song" 5:27 music & words by R.Davies& Rodger Hodgson, string arrangement by Brad Mehldau
2. "Caminhos Cruzados" 4:49 music by Antonio Carlos Jobim, words by Newton Mendonca
3. "Chanson De Delphine" 5:25 music by Michel Legrand, words by Jacques Demi
4. "Up from the Skies" 3:36 music & words by Jimi Hendrix
5. "Resignacao Nao Pra Nos" 5:57 music by Brad Mehldau, words by Fleurine
6. "Made of Sand" 7:20 music & words by Fleurine, string arrangement by Brad Mehldau
7. "Better Days Ahead" 5:11 music by Pat Metheny, words by Fleurine
8. "Sem Resposta" 5:07 Music by Brad Mehldau, words by Fleurine
9. "Close Enough for Love" 6:45 music by Johnny Mandel, words by P.Williams
10. "O Amor Chegou" 4:54 Music by Brad Mehldau, words by Fleurine string arrangement by Brad Mehldau

== Personnel ==
- Fleurine – vocals
- Brad Mehldau – piano
- Marianne Csizmadia – violin (tracks 1, 6, 10)
- Ori Kam – viola (tracks 1, 6, 10)
- Noah Hoffeld – cello (tracks 1, 6, 10)
