= Pim Jacobs =

Dutch jazz pianist, composer and TV presenter

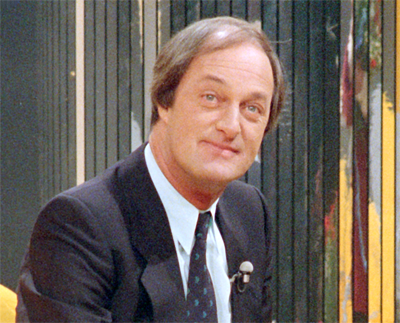
- Jacobs in 1985

Background information
- Birth name: Willem Bernard Jacobs
- Born: 29 October 1934 Hilversum, Netherlands
- Died: 3 July 1996 (aged 61) Tienhoven, Netherlands
- Genres: Jazz
- Occupation(s): Musician, composer, television presenter
- Instrument: Piano
- Formerly of: Rita Reys, Ruud Jacobs

Willem Bernard "Pim" Jacobs (29 October 1934 – 3 July 1996) was a Dutch jazz pianist, composer and television presenter.

== Early life ==
Jacobs was born on 29 October 1934 in Hilversum, the Netherlands. His parents were artistic. He started playing the piano at the age of six. His brother, Ruud, was born in 1938 and became a jazz bassist.

== Later life and career ==
Pim and Ruud formed a trio with drummer Wessel Ilcken in 1954. The band grew with the addition of guitarist Wim Overgaauw and Ilcken's wife, Rita Reys. The trio recorded with Herbie Mann in 1956. Following Ilcken's death in 1957, Pim Jacobs and Reys performed as a duo or trio with Overgaauw, and married in 1960. They often recorded and played jazz festivals in Europe and New Orleans, "their typical program featuring arrangements of vocal music standards as well as bebop material". He also composed film music.

"Jacobs also worked as a producer of non-jazz radio and television programs from 1964, briefly operated the Go Go Club in Loosdrecht, near Hilversum, from 1967, and recorded with Herbie Mann, Bob Cooper, Louis van Dijk, and his own trio." For television, he hosted the music show Music for All. In the 1970s and 1980s he presented concerts in schools.

Jacobs died in Tienhoven on 3 July 1996. The Pim Jacobs Theatre in Maarssen was named after him. A nephew, Bobby Jacobs, became a member of the rock band Focus.

== Discography ==
=== As leader/co-leader ===
Year recorded	Title	Label	Notes
1958	The Jacobs Brothers in Jazz	Fontana	Some tracks trio with Wim Overgaauw (guitar), Ruud Jacobs (drums); some tracks trio with Ruud Jacobs (bass), Cees See (drums); some tracks with Herman Schoonderwalt (alto sax), Ruud Jacobs (tenor sax), Jan Fens (bass), Rudy Pronk (drums); some tracks with Ado Broodboom (trumpet), Tommy Green (trombone), Theo Loevendie (alto sax), Herman Schoonderwalt (tenor sax), Toon Van Vliet (baritone sax), Ruud Jacobs (bass), Cees See (drums); some tracks with Maup Cohen, Lucien Grignard, Piet Kelfkens and Sem Nijveen (violin), Lo Van Broekhoven (viola), Jules De Jong (cello), Ruud Jacobs (bass), Cees See (drums)
1965	School Concert	Philips	Trio, with Wim Overgaauw (guitar), Ruud Jacobs (bass)
1982	Come Fly with Me	Philology	Trio
1986	Fingers Unlimited	Polygram	Quintet, co-led with Louis van Dijk

=== As sideman ===
With Booker Ervin

- Live In VARA Studio 7 (Bootleg)

With Bob Cooper

- Milano Blues (Fresh Sound, 1957)

With Herbie Mann

- Herbie Mann with the Wessel Ilcken Trio (Epic, 1956 [1958])

With Rita Reys

- Rita Reys (Philips, 1957)
- Marriage in Modern Jazz (1960)
- That Old Feeling (Columbia, 1979)
- Swing and Sweet (Blue Note, 1990)

With Wes Montgomery

- Wes Montgomery in Holland (1965)
