= Piet Noordijk =

Dutch saxophonist (1932–2011)

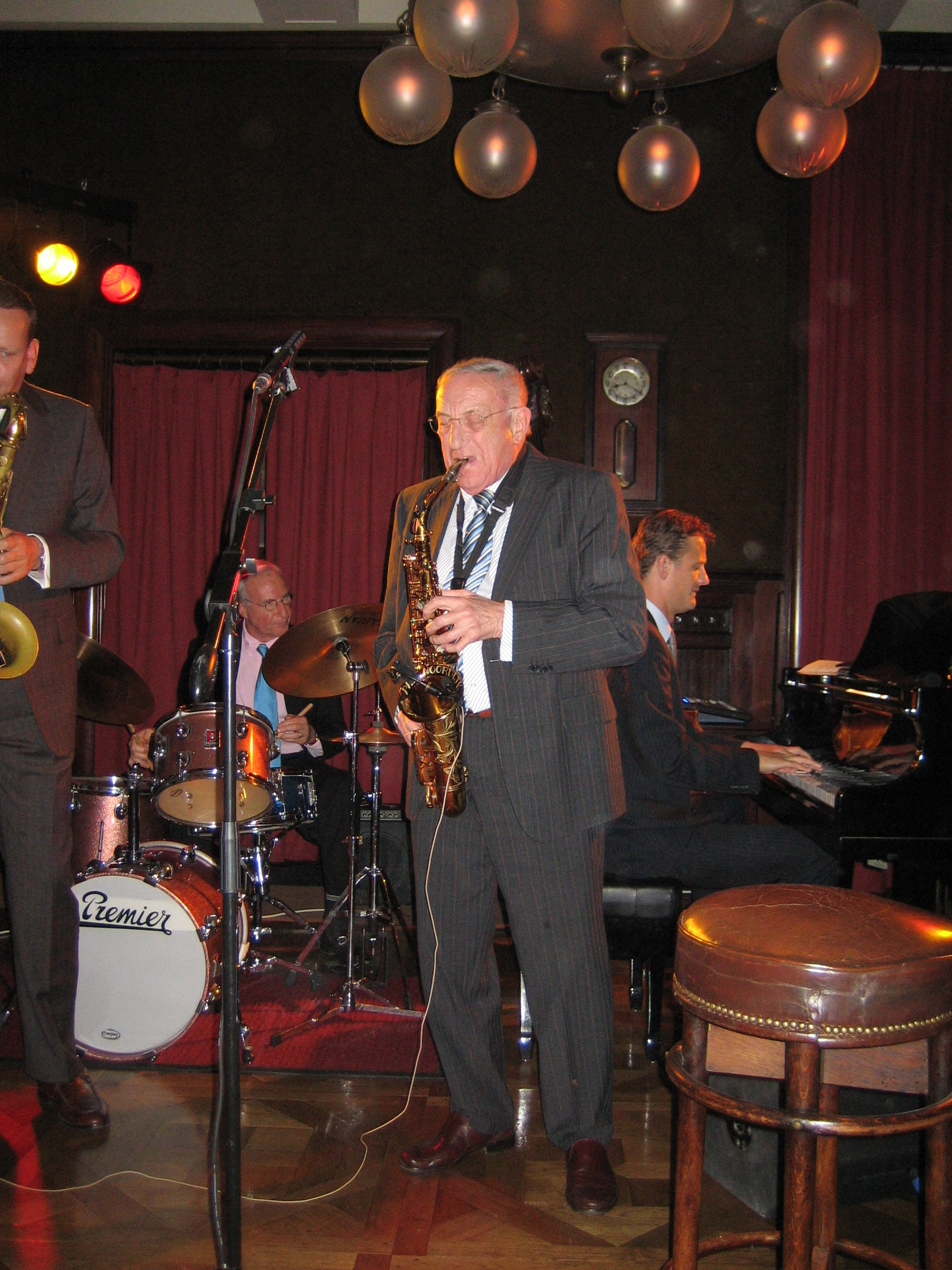
Piet Noordijk playing in Amsterdam, 2009

Piet Noordijk (May 25, 1932 – October 8, 2011) was a Dutch saxophonist.

Noordijk played with orchestras and big bands, including The Skymasters, The Ramblers and Malando. He was awarded the Wessel Ilcken Prize in 1965. Between 1978 and 1992, Noordijk played alto saxophone with the Metropole Orchestra. In 1987 he won a Bird Award.
