= Alan Laurillard =

- Born: April 20, 1946 (age 80); Vancouver, British Columbia, Canada
- Genres: Jazz; free improvisation; world music; electronic music
- Occupations: Composer; bandleader; saxophonist; keyboardist
- Instruments: Saxophone; sampler
- Label: Link Beat

Alan Laurillard (born April 20, 1946) is a Canadian composer, workshop leader, saxophonist, keyboard player and sample artist, living in the Netherlands and Bulgaria. He plays jazz, improvisational music and non-Western music. For his work as a musician, orchestral and workshop leader, and driver of the jazz scene in Groningen, Laurillard received the Boy Edgar Prize in 1982, the most important jazz award in The Netherlands, and four years later received the Henri de Wolf Jazz Prize.

== Youth, education and early career in Canada ==
From 1955 to 1963 Laurillard was a member of the North Vancouver School Orchestra, which won the Canadian championship for school orchestras in 1960. During this period, he studied music theory and composition with Gordon Webster.

Besides the tenor saxophone Laurillard also studied the piano and percussion. Between 1959 and 1972 he worked as a semi-professional saxophonist and arranger for various rock and roll and rhythm and blues groups and big bands in Vancouver. The soul group the Accents (1962–1967) was the most prominent of them. At the University of British Columbia, he completed his studies in mechanical engineering, but did not pursue a career in that field.

== 1970s ==
In 1972 he settled in Amsterdam, where he found a job as a carpenter and studio manager at the Oktopus cultural center. There he organized his first workshops. He founded his Elastiek Band and worked with organist Herbert Noord, with whom he debuted on an album in 1976.

A year earlier, Laurillard had moved to the Dutch village of Eenrum. In the nearby city of Groningen, during sessions at a bar, he met local free improvising musicians like pianist Ko de Regt, bassist Gwan Kwee and multi-instrumentalist and performer Harry de Wit.

He took courses with Herman Schoonderwalt, Misha Mengelberg and Han Bennink, and formed in 1978 with pianist Robert Rettich the Super Jazz Quartet, which occurred frequently in local establishments. In the same period, he began to organize diverse workshop orchestras.

With saxophonist Frans Vermeerssen he founded the Vertical Saxophone Quartet and also his own quartet, with which he recorded in 1981 his first album, New Blues, under his own name.

== 1980s, the Noodband ==
Inspired by the performances of upcoming free funk bands from the United States at the Groninger Jazzmarathon, Laurillard founded in 1981 the Noodband, a double trio with two saxophonists, two bassists and two drummers. That ensemble gained international fame when voice artist Greetje Bijma joined the sextet. They performed at festivals throughout Europe. The Noodband produced two albums and can be considered as Laurillard's most successful project.

== 1990s ==
The Noodband was followed by La Vida Super Nova, the Greetje Bijma Quartet, the Tam Tam Fanfare, Baritone Madness, shouting choir the Blasters, the Holes (including Tony Buck) and the Up There Trio, an ensemble with improvising musicians accompanied by a church organ.

After returning to Amsterdam in 1995, he began groups and projects such as Jerkstation, In Da Da Pocket and the Zuiderzee Orkest. He lived and worked in Utrecht from 1999.

== 2000s ==
Laurillard was artistic director of Luchtkastelen, an international festival of contemporary organ music. After a period in Rotterdam (2004–2006), he has since divided his time between the Netherlands (Amsterdam, since 2011) and Bulgaria. In Bulgaria he plays with Javelin, the End Blues Band, the Dobrich Arts Ensemble and the Dobrich Poets Collective.

== 2010s ==
Besides eight solo albums with sequenced music of his solo act Jerkstation, Laurillard re-established three old bands: the Holes (2012), which plays jazzy dubstep, the Greetje Bijma Quintet, and Up There with organist Hayo Boerema.

== Awards and honours ==
- Boy Edgar Prize (1982)
- Henri de Wolf Prize (1986)
- Golden Valve (1986)

== Bands ==
- An informal rock & roll band (1957)
- North Vancouver School Band (1960)
- The Accents (1962)
- Elastiek Band (1973)
- Groninger Workshop Orchestra (1974)
- Super Jazz Quartet (1978)
- Vertical Saxophone Quartet (1980)
- Alan Laurillard Quartet (1980)
- Noodband (1981)
- La Vida Super Nova (1984)
- Greetje Bijma Quintet (1985)
- Tam Tam Fanfare (1987)
- Baritone Madness (1987)
- Improvised Music Ensemble (1988)
- Lion Tamer of Perpetuum (1989)
- Noord Pool Composers Orchestra (1990)
- Continental Contrast (1991)
- Up There Trio (1997)
- Seafood (1997)
- Red Fog (2000)
- Going Down (2002)
- Fresh Crew (2004)
- The Zuiderzee Orchestra (2005)
- The Griot (2006)
- Javelin (2007)
- The Krishte Blues Band (2008)
- The Holes (2011) - anew
- The Greetje Bijma Kwintet (2015) - anew
- The Westside Slam Crew (2015)
- Up There (2016) - anew

== Discography ==
LPs

- 5 x 6 - Herbert Noord 5 (1976)
- New Blues - Alan Laurillard Quartet (1980)
- Shiver - Noodband (1982)
- Amycamus - Greetje Bijma Kwintet (1986)
- Shopping Around - Noodband (1986)
- Tam Tam Fanfare - Tam Tam Fanfare (1987)
- Dark Moves - Greetje Bijma Quintet (1988)

CDs

- Tales of a Voice - Greetje Bijma Kwintet (1991)
- Push It - Up There Trio (1996)
- Bait - Seafood (1997)
- Ropewalk - with Tristan Laurillard and Toddler Thor (1997)
- Race Till Death - Red Fog (2000)
- Mental Dive - Krutzen & Jerk (2000)
- Jerkstation - Jerkstation (solo) (2000)
- Take a Deep Breath - Going Down (2002)
- It Make You Healthy - Alivo (2003)
- Fresh Crew - Fresh Crew (2004)
- Gotta Crash on You - Going Down (2004)
- Voice Over - Jerkstation (2004)
- Squeak City - Jerkstation (2007)
- It's Dark Up There - Up There (2008)
- Sharp Points and Bubbles - Javelin (2009)
- Squeak City - Jerkstation (2009)
- Solarized - Jerkstation (2009)
- Radio 100 - Jerkstation (2010)
- Beat City - Jerkstation (2011)
- Around Ze World - Jerkstation (2012)
- On the One - Jerkstation (2013)
- Blue Squeaks - Jerkstation (2014)
