= Boy Edgar =

Dutch conductor and pianist

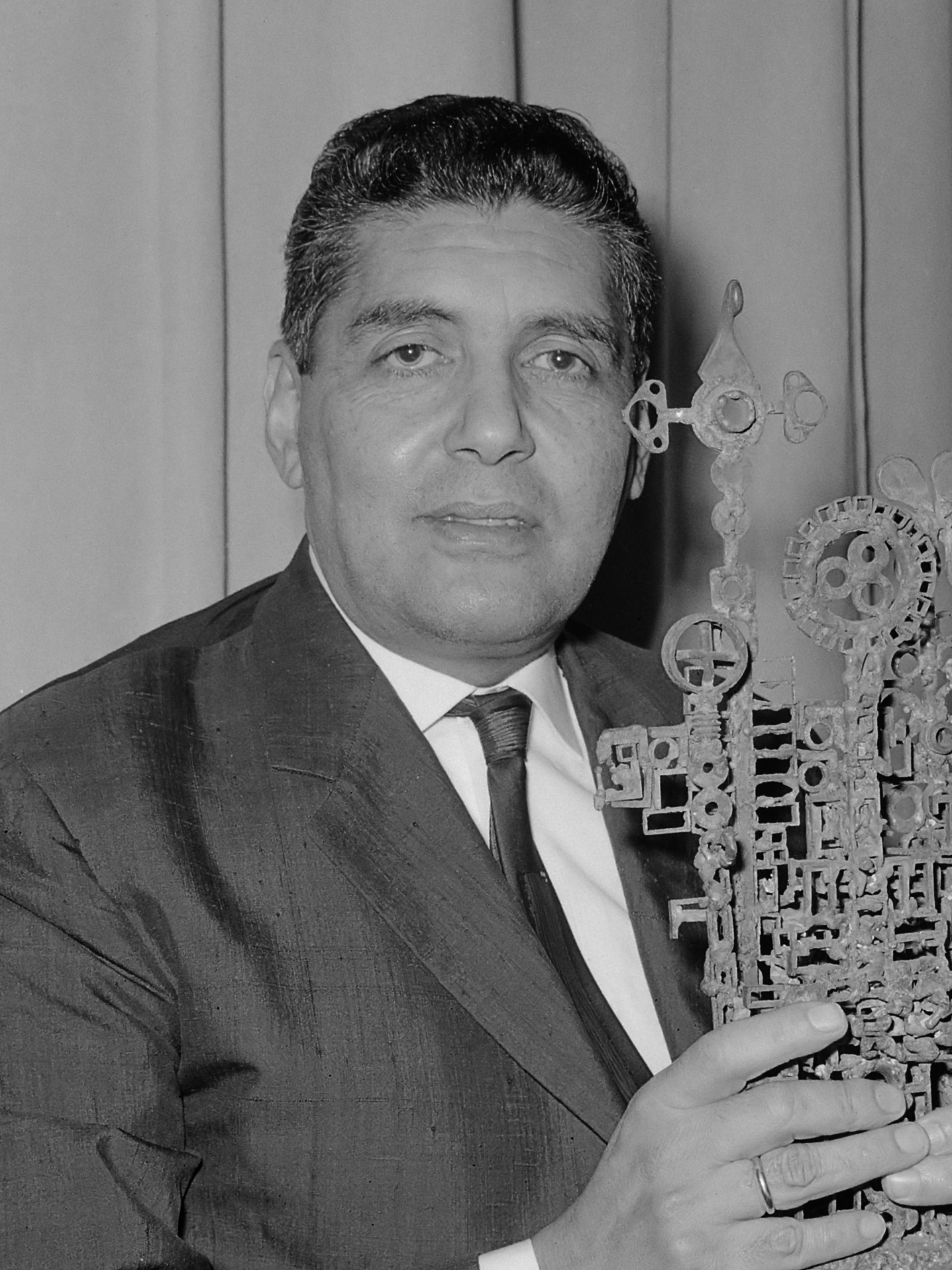
- Boy Edgar in 1964
- Born: George Willem Fred Edgar; 31 March 1915; The Netherlands
- Died: 8 April 1980 (aged 65)
- Years active: 1935–1979
- Style: Jazz

Boy Edgar, pseudonyms of George Willem Fred Edgar (Amsterdam, 31 March 1915 – 8 April 1980), was a Dutch jazz conductor, pianist and trumpeter. He was also a member of the resistance who saved Jewish children during WW2 and was promoted as a doctor after the war on an investigation into multiple sclerosis.

== Life and career ==
Boy Edgar grew up in Amsterdam as the son of a merchant in colonial products. His father was of Armenian descent and his mother Jewish and was from the Dutch East Indies. Initially, the Edgar family was doing well. During his childhood, Boy Edgar was able to visit the Dutch East Indies several times. However, during the economic crisis in the 1930s, the Edgar family's company went bankrupt. His father died in 1935 and left the family in poverty.

Boy Edgar first came into contact with jazz in high school. Despite the fact that he had not received any musical training, Edgar succeeded in teaching himself arrangements and how to play the piano and the trumpet. In 1932 he started his medical training at the University of Amsterdam. He performed a lot to pay for his studies. In 1935 Boy Edgar recorded a number of songs in the GTB studio in The Hague, including "In the mood for love". In 1936 he won a prize for amateur soloists in Brussels and a year later he became a member of the Hague ensemble The Moochers. In 1939 he became leader of this ensemble, which he remained until the German occupier banned jazz music.

During the war he married Mimosa Frenk (1942-9-30), the Jewish daughter of Eli Frenk and Agnes Bushnach, and together they participated in the underground resistance to save Jewish children from deportation. During the war he did his medical exam. Edgar also composed music for orchestras that were allowed to perform.

Edgar was briefly imprisoned after the Second World War because he refused to go to the Dutch East Indies as a soldier. The first years after the war he continued to act as a pianist in various European countries.

In 1950, Edgar obtained his PhD with a thesis on processes in the nervous system of multiple sclerosis, a disease that his wife was already suffering from at that time. To fully focus on his scientific career and the care of his wife, Edgar stopped making music for some time. His wife died on 3 December 1958. On 5 July 1960, he remarried Ida Jannie Lengtat.

Edgar made several full-length records during this period, won an Edison Award and regularly performed with international stars on radio and television. In 1964 he received the Wessel Ilcken Prize. The pinnacle of his artistic career was in the mid-60s, when Boy's Big Band recorded the LPs Now's the time (1965) and Finch Eye (1966). In October 1966 Edgar left for the United States to teach at a number of universities and conduct further research. He stayed in the United States for three years and returned in 1969.

Back in the Netherlands he became a doctor in Duivendrecht and the Bijlmermeer, but Edgar could no longer properly combine his work as a doctor and jazz. His Band, which had already fallen apart during his absence, was finally dissolved in 1971. In the 1970s, Edgar did conduct for the Boy Edgar Sound group.

After separating from Ida Jannie Lengtat on 1971-06-28, he remarried her on 1973-7-11.

Gerrie van der Klei was his partner for some time.

At the end of 1979 he quit his job as a general practitioner. A short time later he died at the age of 65. As a tribute, the Wessel Ilcken Prize, which he had won in 1964, was renamed to the Boy Edgar Award in 1980; since 1992 it has been called the VPRO/Boy Edgar Award. This prize is described by the Dutch Performing Arts Social Fund as the most important in the Dutch jazz world.

In 2018, Boy Edgar was posthumously awarded by Yad Vashem for his help to Jews during the Second World War.

== Discography ==
- 1965 – Now's The Time – LP Artone MGOS 9463
- 1966 – Finch Eye – LP Artone MDS S 3001
- 1969 – Various – The Dutch Jazz Scene (Compilatie) Track A1 – A5 – 7-LP Radio Nederland 109 917/923
- 1971 – Boy's Big Band – The Best Of Boy's Big Band – Compilation LP CBS S 52888
- 1973 – Live in Shaffy – LP White Elephant PE 888.017
- 1975 – Gerry van der Klei – Multifaced Gerry – LP Poker PO 13002
- 1978 – Various – Date with the Dutch – 7 × Vinyl 10" Track N1 en N2 – Radio Nederland 109 766/772 Z
- 1979 – Music Was His Mistress, An Hommage To Edward Kennedy Ellington – LP BV Haast Records BVHAAST 022
- 1999 – Now's The Time! + Finch Eye – BV Haast Records CD 9901
- 2014 – De geniale chaos van Boy Edgar – 678 Records SSECD-002
- 2015 – Return Live Recordings 1965–1966 – CD Nederlands Jazz Archief NJA 1501

== Literature ==
- Marie-Claire Melzer & Marieke Klomp Boy Edgar: het dubbelleven van een alleskunner, 2015, Uitgeverij Cossee, ISBN 9789059365889
