= Louis van Dijk =

Dutch musician (1941–2020)

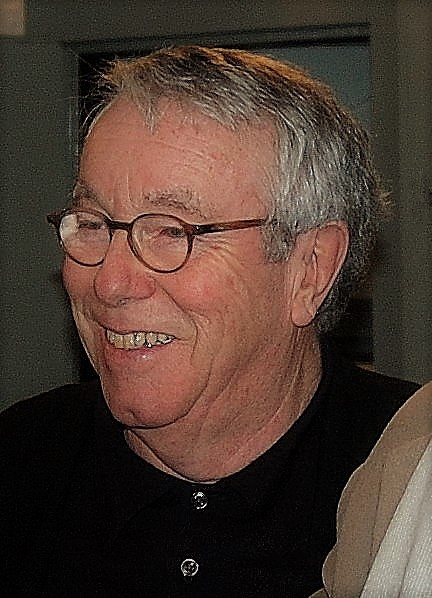
- Louis van Dijk (2008)
- Born: Arnold Ludwig van Dijk; 27 November 1941; Amsterdam, Netherlands
- Died: 12 April 2020 (aged 78); Laren, North Holland, Netherlands
- Occupation: Classical pianist
- Website: www.louisvandijk.nl

Louis van Dijk, also spelled Louis van Dyke (27 November 1941 – 12 April 2020), was a Dutch pianist.

Born as Arnold Ludwig van Dijk in Amsterdam, he studied solo piano at the Amsterdam Conservatorium. Louis van Dijk became well known for his improvisational talent in the classical genre. He played with Pim Jacobs and Pieter van Vollenhoven under the name Gevleugelde Vrienden ("Winged Friends"). In September 2005, he played at a charity concert at the Concertgebouw to raise funds for New Orleans after the city was hit by Hurricane Katrina. For his accomplishments as a musician, he was awarded the honorary title of Knight of the Order of the Netherlands Lion. He died in Laren, aged 78.
