= Lucas van Merwijk =

Dutch drummer

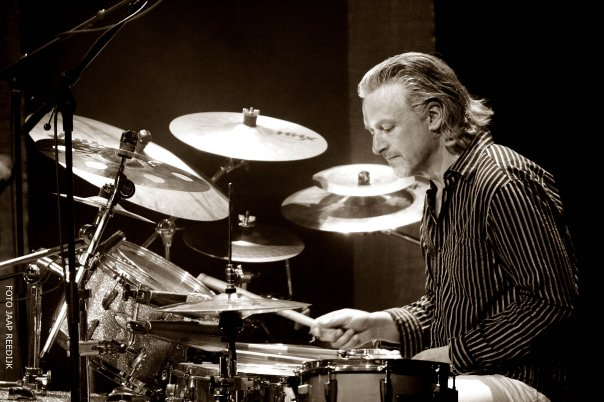

Lucas Sebastiaan van Merwijk (born 1961 in De Bilt, Utrecht) is a Dutch drummer, bandleader, and professor who has made contributions to the European jazz, Latin music, and drums-percussion scene since the early 1980s. He has received awards including being named 'Best Jazz Drummer' and 'Best Fusion Drummer' in the Benelux countries by the readers of the magazine De Slagwerkkrant between 1993 and 2020.

Lucas van Merwijk is currently a professor of drums at the Jazz Department of the Conservatory of Amsterdam and a professor of drums and Latin percussion at the World Music Department of Codarts in the Netherlands. He has also served as a teacher and clinician at 9Beats in Tianjin, Beijing, China.

Van Merwijk has also been a founder, leader, conductor, arranger, and musical director of various music groups. He has been founder and leader of the international percussion group Drums United, founder and leader of Van Merwijk's Music Machine and the Cubop City Big Band in the Netherlands and co-director of Tam Tam Productions in Amsterdam.

Van Merwijk is an expert in Latin drums and established himself as a versatile musician, composer, and arranger. He has collaborated with a wide range of artists and ensembles including the Metropole Orchestra, Jessye Norman, Vince Mendoza, Chris Hinze, Manou Gallo andAndy Gonzalez; he has performed internationally including in Europe, the US, Canada and India.

In 2010 Van Merwijk won the Global Act Award 2010 for remaining continuously successful as a leading international Artist in world music over a long period of time.

In 2013 he published the drum book World Beat: World Rhythms for Drum Set, followed by Advanced Coordination Studies in 2017.
