= HH11 =

HH11, HH-11, HH 11, HH.11, may refer to:

- At All Costs (Weber novel), abbreviated "HH11", eleventh main-line novel in the Honor Harrington novel series, part of the Honorverse fictional milieu created by David Weber
- HH11, one of the Hamburger–Hamilton stages in chick development
- Tachykinin receptor 3 (HH11)

== See also ==
- HH (disambiguation)
- H11 (disambiguation)
- H (disambiguation)
