= HH12 =

HH12, HH-12, HH 12, HH.12, may refer to:

- Mission of Honor (novel), abbreviated "HH12", 12th main-line novel in the Honor Harrington novel series, part of the Honorverse fictional milieu created by David Weber
- HH12, one of the Hamburger–Hamilton stages in chick development
- Gonadotropin-releasing hormone (HH12)

== See also ==
- HH (disambiguation)
- H12 (disambiguation)
- H (disambiguation)
