= Matt Penman =

New Zealand jazz bassist and composer

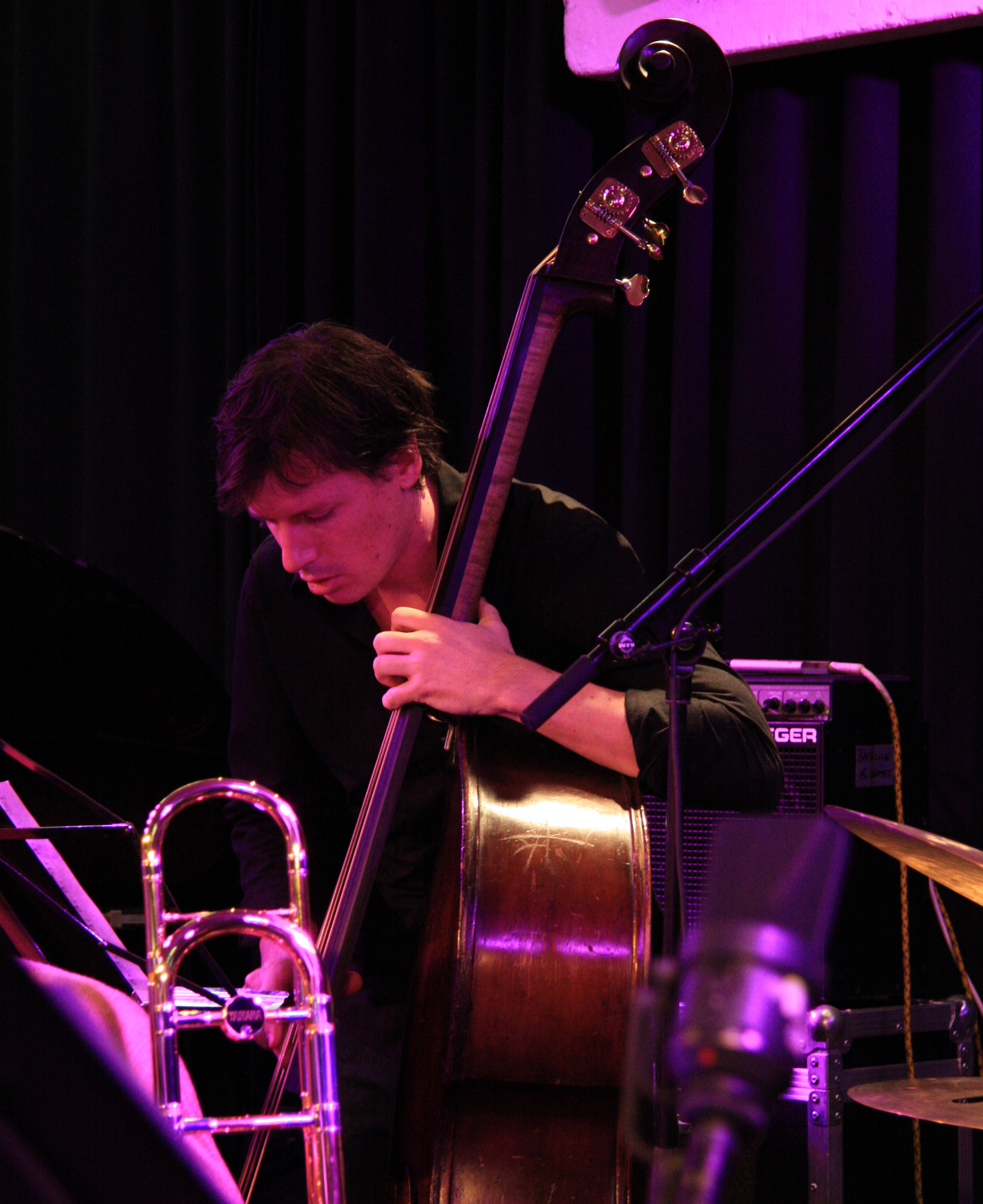
- Penman in Munich in 2010

Background information
- Origin: Auckland, New Zealand
- Genre: Jazz
- Occupations: Musician, composer
- Instrument: Double bass
- Labels: Fresh Sound New Talent, Sunnyside Records
- Website: www.mattpenman.com

Matt Penman is a New Zealand jazz bassist and composer based in New York City. He has been a member of the SFJAZZ Collective and Nils Wogram's Root 70, and is a founding member of James Farm, a quartet with saxophonist Joshua Redman, pianist Aaron Parks, and drummer Eric Harland.

== Early life and education ==
Penman grew up in Auckland, where he played jazz, funk, and rock before receiving formal jazz training. In 1994, he moved to the United States on a scholarship to Berklee College of Music in Boston. He studied there for about a year before moving to New York City in 1995.

== Career ==
Penman recorded with the quartet Flipside, whose self-titled album appeared on Naxos Jazz in 1998. The group also included guitarist Greg Tuohey, saxophonist Jérôme Sabbagh, and drummer Darren Beckett.

His debut album as a leader, The Unquiet, was recorded in December 2001 and released in 2002 by Fresh Sound New Talent. It contains eight original compositions and features saxophonist Chris Cheek, guitarist Kurt Rosenwinkel, pianist Aaron Goldberg, and drummer Jeff Ballard. Penman followed it with Catch of the Day in 2008.

Penman joined the SFJAZZ Collective in 2005. As well as playing bass, he contributed original compositions and arrangements to the ensemble's repertoire. For its Live: SFJAZZ Center 2016 – Music of Miles Davis & Original Compositions, released in 2017, he arranged Davis's "Milestones".

James Farm first performed at the Montreal International Jazz Festival in 2009 and released its self-titled debut on Nonesuch Records in April 2011. All four members contributed compositions. Penman and Harland had previously recorded together on Parks's Invisible Cinema (2008). The quartet's second album, City Folk, followed in 2014.

In 2018, Penman released Good Question on Sunnyside Records. He conceived its compositions as musical questions for his collaborators to explore through their performances. The musicians included Parks, saxophonists Mark Turner and Will Vinson, guitarist Nir Felder, drummer Obed Calvaire, and percussionist Rogério Boccato. Reviewing the album for WBGO, Nate Chinen described its music as an example of contemporary post-bop and discussed Penman's contributions as both bassist and composer.

Penman and drummer Ari Hoenig played on pianist Billy Childs's Triumvirate, released in 2026. The album was recorded in New York in May 2025 and revisits compositions from Childs's earlier recordings.

== Selected discography ==
=== As leader ===
- The Unquiet (Fresh Sound New Talent, 2002)
- Catch of the Day (Fresh Sound New Talent, 2008)
- Good Question (Sunnyside, 2018)

=== With Flipside ===
- Flipside (Naxos Jazz, 1998)

=== With James Farm ===
- James Farm (Nonesuch, 2011)
- City Folk (Nonesuch, 2014)
