= Virgin Forest (album) =

Studio album by Lionel Loueke
- Released: 23 October 2006
- Recorded: December 2005 — June 2006
- Studio: Sear Sound; Knoop Studios; ObliqSound Studio; Bennett Studios
- Genre: Jazz
- Length: 59:28
- Label: ObliqSound
- Producer: Robert Sadin, Michele Locatelli

Lionel Loueke chronology
In a Trance (2005)	Virgin Forest (2006)	Karibu (2008)

Professional ratings
Review scores
Source	Rating
All About Jazz	4/5 stars
AllMusic	3.5/5 stars
Tom Hull	B+

Virgin Forest is a studio album by Beninese guitarist Lionel Loueke. ObliqSound released the album on 23 October 2006.

== Reception ==
Terrell Kent Holmes of All About Jazz wrote: "It's sobering to know that certain types of music can face extinction like a species of wildlife or a dwindling natural resource. Loueke has expressed concern that the indigenous rhythms of Benin are starting to disappear so with the help of percussion ensembles led by the Raimi and Tessi Brothers, Loueke seeks to preserve them on Virgin Forest." Michael G. Nastos of AllMusic stated: "One suspects Loueke and friends are merely scratching the surface, with hopes that he will not be swayed by more commercial considerations, following this diverse worldly path he has chosen while broadening its swath and depth."

== Track listing ==
All tracks are written by Lionel Loueke except where noted.

No.	Title	Writer(s)	Length
1.	"Prelude to Rossignol"		0:51
2.	"Rossignol"		5:23
3.	"Prelude to Vivi"		0:44
4.	"Vivi"		5:11
5.	"Kponnon Kpètè"		2:40
6.	"Postlude to Kponnon Kpètè"		3:10
7.	"Prelude to Abominwé"		0:52
8.	"Abominwé"		4:05
9.	"Le Réveil Des Agneaux"	Herbie Hancock	4:33
10.	"Danse Des Animaux"	Cyro Baptista	1:56
11.	"Prelude to Madjigua"		1:40
12.	"Madjigua"		6:32
13.	"Dispute Des Loups"	Cyro Baptista	1:05
14.	"Benny's Tune"		4:51
15.	"Moesha I"		5:13
16.	"La Poursuite Du Lion"	Herbie Hancock	3:08
17.	"Prelude to Virgin Forest"		1:12
18.	"Virgin Forest"		6:22
Total length:			59:28

== Personnel ==
- Lionel Loueke – guitars, vocals, percussion
- Massimo Biolcati – bass
- Ferenc Nemeth – drums, percussion
- Herbie Hancock – piano
- Cyro Baptista – percussion
- Gretchen Parlato – vocals
