= Mwaliko =

Studio album by Lionel Loueke
- Released: 9 February 2010
- Studio: Aye Studio; Skyline Studio; Systems Two; (Brooklyn, NYC)
- Genre: Jazz, pop/rock
- Length: 49:17
- Label: Blue Note 509996 88508 2 1
- Producer: Lionel Loueke

Lionel Loueke chronology
Karibu (2008)	Mwaliko (2010)	Heritage (2012)

Professional ratings
Review scores
Source	Rating
All About Jazz	2/5 stars
AllMusic	3.5/5 stars
The Guardian	4/5 stars
Jazz Forum	4/5 stars
PopMatters	8/10

Mwaliko is a studio album by Beninese guitarist Lionel Loueke. Blue Note released the album on 5 June 2012.

== Background ==
This is Loueke's second album for Blue Note. The album contains 12 tracks od which eight are originals written by Loueke who tries to find a smooth medium between African elements and American jazz. The record the album Loueke invided an array of other musicians, among whom are Esperanza Spalding, Richard Bona, and Angélique Kidjo playing and singing. The word "mwaliko" means "invitation" in Swahili.

== Reception ==
Thom Jurek of AllMusic wrote: "Mwaliko is an excellent step forward for Loueke, who is quickly proving to be an innovative force in 21st century jazz". Banning Eyre of NPR stated: ""No territory forbidden" is a kind of jazz credo, but a tough one to live up to. Lionel Loueke walks the walk, and Mwaliko solidifies his standing as a truly original voice in today's jazz." Kevin Le Gendre of BBC added: "Loueke’s melding of rhythmic complexity and sophisticated chords has produced music which is both in and outside the lineage of Afro jazz, primarily because he doesn’t simply apply Western harmony to a non-Western rhythmic base but rather constructs songs with a languid, floating, at times ethereal quality..."

== Track listing ==
All tracks are written by Lionel Loueke except where noted.

No.	Title	Writer(s)	Length
1.	"Ami O"	Ebanda Manfred	4:21
2.	"Griot"		6:03
3.	"Twins"		5:30
4.	"Wishes"		4:43
5.	"Flying"		4:03
6.	"Intro to L.L."		1:17
7.	"L.L."		6:10
8.	"Nefertiti"	Wayne Shorter	4:44
9.	"Vi Ma Yon"	Traditional	2:29
10.	"Shazoo"	Massimo Biolcati	4:22
11.	"Dangbe"		0:39
12.	"Hide Life"		4:34
Total length:			49:17

== Personnel ==
- Lionel Loueke – guitars, vocals
- Massimo Biolcati – bass (tracks: 2 7 10)
- Esperanza Spalding – bass, vocals (tracks: 3 5)
- Richard Bona – bass, vocals (tracks: 4 12)
- Ferenc Nemeth – drums (tracks: 2 7 10)
- Marcus Gilmore – drums (tracks: 8)
- Angélique Kidjo – vocals (tracks: 1 9)
