= The Journey (Lionel Loueke album) =

Studio album by Lionel Loueke
- Released: 28 September 2018
- Recorded: January 2018
- Studio: Les Studios Saint Germain (Paris)
- Genre: Jazz
- Length: 52:00
- Label: Aparté
- Producer: Robert Sadin

Lionel Loueke chronology
Obsession (2017)	The Journey (2018)	Close Your Eyes (2018)

Professional ratings
Review scores
Source	Rating
All About Jazz	4.5/5 stars
Jazzwise	4/5 stars

The Journey is a studio album by Beninese guitarist Lionel Loueke recorded with 12 other musicians. Aparté released the album on 28 September 2018.

== Background ==
Loueke assembled an array of guest musicians to record the album. The 15 songs on this album demonstrate some of the most versatile music the guitarist has created to date, and represent a sort of summary of his career-spanning works. In his interview for DownBeat Loueke explained: "My CDs are all different, and I like them that way. This one in particular is really different, because it’s a resumé of all I’ve done in the past, and a continuation of what I’m doing now. It’s the first time I’m combining classical musicians and classical musical instruments with jazz and African instruments, all on the same project. It’s the first time I’m putting a CD out without a drum set; it’s all percussion. So, yes, we definitely have a different character."

== Reception ==
Roger Farby of Jazz Journal stated: "Several things immediately strike the listener on first hearing The Journey. First, the eclectic mix of the tracks and their respective contributors reflect the disparate influences that have shaped Lionel Loueke’s composing skills. Then there’s the guitarist’s ability to avoid the well-trodden paths of others and his gift for playing the instrument like it’s a natural extension of his being. All are crucial factors testifying to his uniqueness." Andy Robson of Jazzwise added: "Jazz has always been the music of the movement of peoples, the soundtrack to the journeys, some chosen, more often forced, that mark the migrations of humankind. Few artists witness these journeys as wisely and lyrically, yet infused with pain, as Loueke."

== Track listing ==
No.	Title	Writer(s)	Length
1.	"Bouriyan"	Loueke, Christi Joza Orisha, Cyro Baptista	3:15
2.	"Molika"	Loueke, John Ellis, Cyro Baptista	3:52
3.	"Bawo"	Loueke, Pino Palladino, Christi Joza Orisha, Robert Sadin	3:57
4.	"Vi Gnin"	Loueke, Christi Joza Orisha, Cyro Baptista	5:38
5.	"Mandé"	Loueke, Dramane Dembélé, John Ellis, Pino Palladino, Christi Joza Orisha	4:25
6.	"Kába"	Loueke, Mark Feldman, Cyro Baptista, Dramane Dembélé, Pino Palladino, Christi Joza Orisha, Robert Sadin	4:36
7.	"Dark Lightning"	Loueke	2:19
8.	"Vivi"	Loueke	3:19
9.	"Hope"	Loueke, Patrick Messina, Cyro Baptista, Vincent Ségal	5:47
10.	"Gbê"	Loueke, Étienne Charles, Cyro Baptista	3:49
11.	"Gbêdetemin"	Loueke, Christi Joza Orisha, Cyro Baptista, Robert Sadin	4:05
12.	"Guira"	Loueke	0:30
13.	"Okagbé"	Loueke, Massimo Biolcati, Ferenc Nemeth	2:31
14.	"Reflections On Vi Gnin"	Loueke	2:27
15.	"The Healing"	Loueke	2:22
Total length:			52:00

== Personnel ==
- Lionel Loueke – guitars, vocals, percussion
- Pino Palladino – bass
- Cyro Baptista – percussion
- John Ellis – soprano saxophone
- Christi Joza Orisha – percussion
- Robert Sadin – keyboards
- Dramane Dembélé – peul flute
- Mark Feldman – violin
- Patrick Messina – clarinet
- Vincent Ségal – cello
- Étienne Charles – trumpet
- Massimo Biolcati – bass
- Ferenc Nemeth – percussion
