= Michael Mayo =

American singer and composer (born 1992)

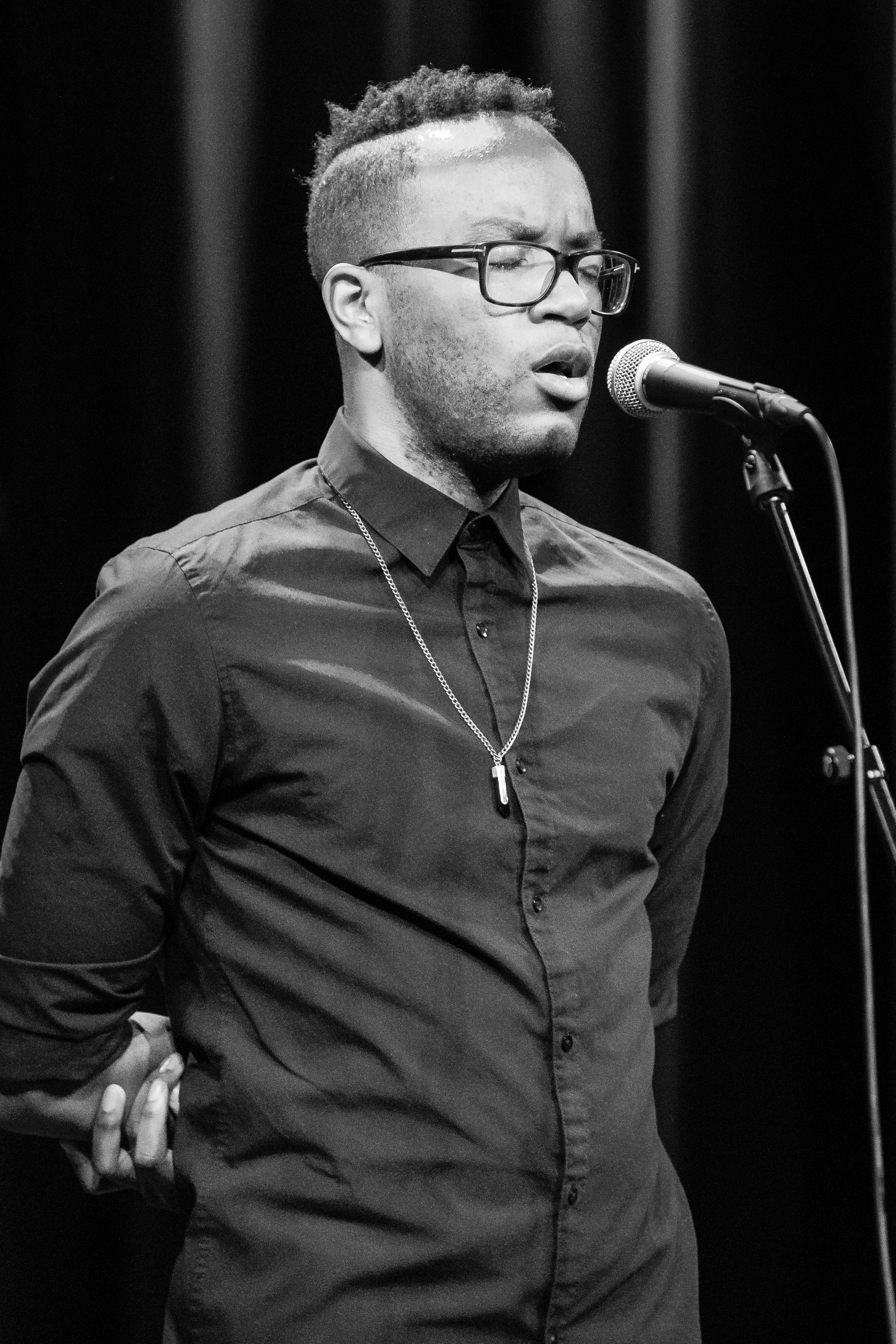
- Mayo performing in Oslo, 2022

Background information
- Born: June 1, 1992 (age 34); Los Angeles, California, U.S.
- Genres: Jazz; gospel; R&B; neo soul
- Occupations: Singer; songwriter; composer
- Instrument: Vocals
- Years active: 2017–present
- Label: Mack Avenue
- Member of: Shrek Is Love
- Website: michaelmayomusic.com

Michael Mayo (born June 1, 1992) is an American singer and composer. He has performed and toured with Kneebody, Jacob Collier, Christian Sands, Josh Groban, Nate Smith and Herbie Hancock. He released his debut studio album Bones in 2021, followed by his sophomore album Fly in 2024.

== Early life ==
Michael Mayo was born on June 1, 1992, in Los Angeles. He was raised in the Van Nuys neighborhood of Los Angeles by his father Scott Mayo, a saxophonist and multi-instrumentalist, and his mother Valerie Pinkston, a singer. His parents performed with such musicians as Stevie Wonder, Diana Ross, and Luther Vandross, throughout his youth.

Mayo began singing at a young age and was inspired to become a professional jazz vocalist after singer Gretchen Parlato visited Mayo's high school, the Los Angeles County High School for the Arts. Mayo went on to attend the New England Conservatory of Music, where he received a bachelor's degree in jazz vocal performance. In 2015, he became the third vocalist to be accepted to the Thelonius Monk Institute of Jazz (now the Herbie Hancock Institute) at University of California, Los Angeles, where he studied with Herbie Hancock, Wayne Shorter, and Dianne Reeves.

== Career ==
In 2017 and 2018, Mayo performed and recorded two EPs as a member of the Shrek-themed jazz/R&B band Shrek Is Love. He has also appeared as a featured vocalist on multiple albums by drummer Nate Smith. In 2019, Mayo performed in the NPR Tiny Desk Concert for fellow Los Angeles–based act Moonchild.

After completing a tour with Herbie Hancock, Mayo was inspired to create his debut album. Mayo released his debut album Bones in 2021 on Mack Avenue Records with production by Eli Wolf, who previously produced for Al Green, Norah Jones, and The Roots. Described by Jazzwise as "a work of startling originality, presenting a musical sound-world which references everything from The Beach Boys to J Dilla," the album features both of Mayo's parents on its closing track. The album's track "Stolen Moments" draws influence from jazz and a cappella singer Bobby McFerrin, featuring more than 250 layered tracks of Mayo's vocals.

Mayo's sophomore album Fly was released in October 2024, also on Mack Avenue. In 2025, Mayo performed his own NPR Tiny Desk Concert, featuring songs from both Bones and Fly. At the 68th Annual Grammy Awards, Fly received a nomination forBest Jazz Vocal Album, and the track "Four" received a nomination for Best Jazz Performance.

== Discography ==
=== Studio albums ===
- Bones (2021)
- Fly (2024)
