= Alon Yavnai =

Israeli jazz pianist

Alon Yavnai (Hebrew: אלון יבנאי; born 1969) is an Israel-born jazz pianist.

== Biography ==
Born in Israel, Yavnai began playing piano at the age of four. He has accompanied singers since the age of thirteen. He graduated from the Thelma Yellin High School for Arts, Givatayim Conservatory, both in Israel, and studied at Berklee College of Music in Boston. He won first place in the Great American Jazz Piano Competition. He taught at the Sitka Fine Arts Camp.

Yavnai leads a trio and has worked in a duo with Paquito D'Rivera and in a trio with Mark Summer. He has also worked with Leny Andrade, Regina Carter, Jim Chapin, Ravi Coltrane, George Garzone, Louis Hayes, Freddie Hubbard, Joe Lovano, Romero Lubambo, Bob Moses New York Voices, Rosa Passos, Rufus Reid, Claudio Roditi, and Nancy Wilson.

In 2008, Yavnai won a Grammy Award as a part of the Paquito D'Rivera Quintet for Best Latin Jazz Album (Funk Tango). Yavnai wrote the title track. In May 2008, Yavnai released his album Travel Notes which features solo pieces as well as trio pieces (with Omer Avital on bass and Jamey Haddad on percussion).

== Discography ==
=== As leader/co-leader ===
Year recorded	Year released	Title	Label	Personnel/Notes
2001?	2001	D.S. Al Coda	Whaling City Sound	Most tracks sextet, with George Garzone (tenor sax, soprano sax), Dino Govoni (tenor sax, flute), Avishai Cohen (trumpet, flugelhorn), Massimo Biolcati (bass), Take Toriyama (drums); some tracks with Michal Cohen (vocals), Baoz Nemet (darbouka) added
2004?	2005	Picture This	Bon Rapport	Most tracks trio, with Massimo Biolcati (bass), Take Toriyama (drums); some tracks quartet, with Paquito D'Rivera (reeds) added
2007	2008	Travel Notes	ObliqSound	Some tracks solo piano; some tracks trio, with Omer Avital (bass), Jamey Haddad (percussion)
	2012	Shir Ahava	Alon Yavnai	With the NDR Big Band
	2016	Reconnect	Gateway Music	Duo, co-led with Jesper Riis (trumpet)

=== As sideman ===
- Caribbean Jazz Project, Mosaic (Concord Picante, 2006)
- Paquito D'Rivera, Jazz Chamber Trio (Chesky, 2005)
- Paquito D'Rivera, Funk Tango (Sunnyside/Paquito, 2007)
- Nancy Wilson, Turned to Blue (MCG Jazz, 2006)
