= Gaïa (album) =

Studio album by Lionel Loueke
- Released: 30 October 2015
- Recorded: 2015
- Studio: Sear Sound
- Genre: Jazz
- Length: 55:40
- Label: Blue Note 0602547423801
- Producer: Don Was

Lionel Loueke chronology
Heritage (2012)	Gaïa (2015)	Hope (2017)

Professional ratings
Review scores
Source	Rating
All About Jazz	4.5/5 stars
AllMusic	4/5 stars
Creative Loafing	3.5/5 stars
Financial Times	4/5 stars
The Guardian	4/5 stars
Jazzwise	4/5 stars
Tom Hull	B+

Gaïa is a studio album by Beninese guitarist Lionel Loueke recorded with Massimo Biolcati on bass and Ferenc Nemeth on drums. Blue Note released the album on 30 October 2015.

== Background ==
Gaïa was recorded live at Sear Sound and produced by Blue Note Records president Don Was. The album is named after Gaia, the mother of the Earth in Greek mythology, and contains 12 tracks, of which 11 are original compositions. Loueke suggests that the goddess is furious because humanity has ruined the natural world it originally encountered in order to build industrial societies. In his view, climate change now dominates contemporary social worries, yet the ecological message that he sends is not easily discernible just from listening to the album.

== Reception ==
Thom Jurek of AllMusic stated: "These trio members need no collaborators, extra production, or overdubs; they can -- and do -- deliver almost endless variations on all the stylistic genres they choose. The kinetic energy and obvious delight expressed by these players in such intimate and idea-rich conversation make Gaïa Loueke's most satisfying release to date." John Fordham of The Guardian wrote: "The band switch between Hendrix-like wails, kora-like chimes and power-trio rock in a blink, and the songs are consistently strong... The trio sound like a jam-band here, but one with a unique, accessible, exciting and still-evolving identity." Nate Chinen of The New York Times added: "Subtlety has always been a hallmark of this band, and, in some respects, “Gaïa” — full of tripwire rhythmic intricacies that register as casual, even natural — underscores that strength."

== Track listing ==
All tracks are written by Lionel Loueke except track 12 written by Barry Gibb, Maurice Gibb, Robin Gibb.

No.	Title	Length
1.	"Broken"	2:44
2.	"Sleepless Night"	5:51
3.	"Sources of Love"	4:31
4.	"Wacko Loco"	3:42
5.	"Aziza Dance"	5:16
6.	"Rain Wash"	4:29
7.	"Forgiveness"	7:06
8.	"Even Teens"	4:01
9.	"Gaïa"	3:46
10.	"Veuve Malienne"	6:30
11.	"Procession"	3:19
12.	"How Deep Is Your Love"	4:21
Total length:		55:40

== Personnel ==
- Lionel Loueke – guitars, vocals, percussion
- Massimo Biolcati – bass
- Ferenc Nemeth – drums
