= Gilfema =

Jazz trio

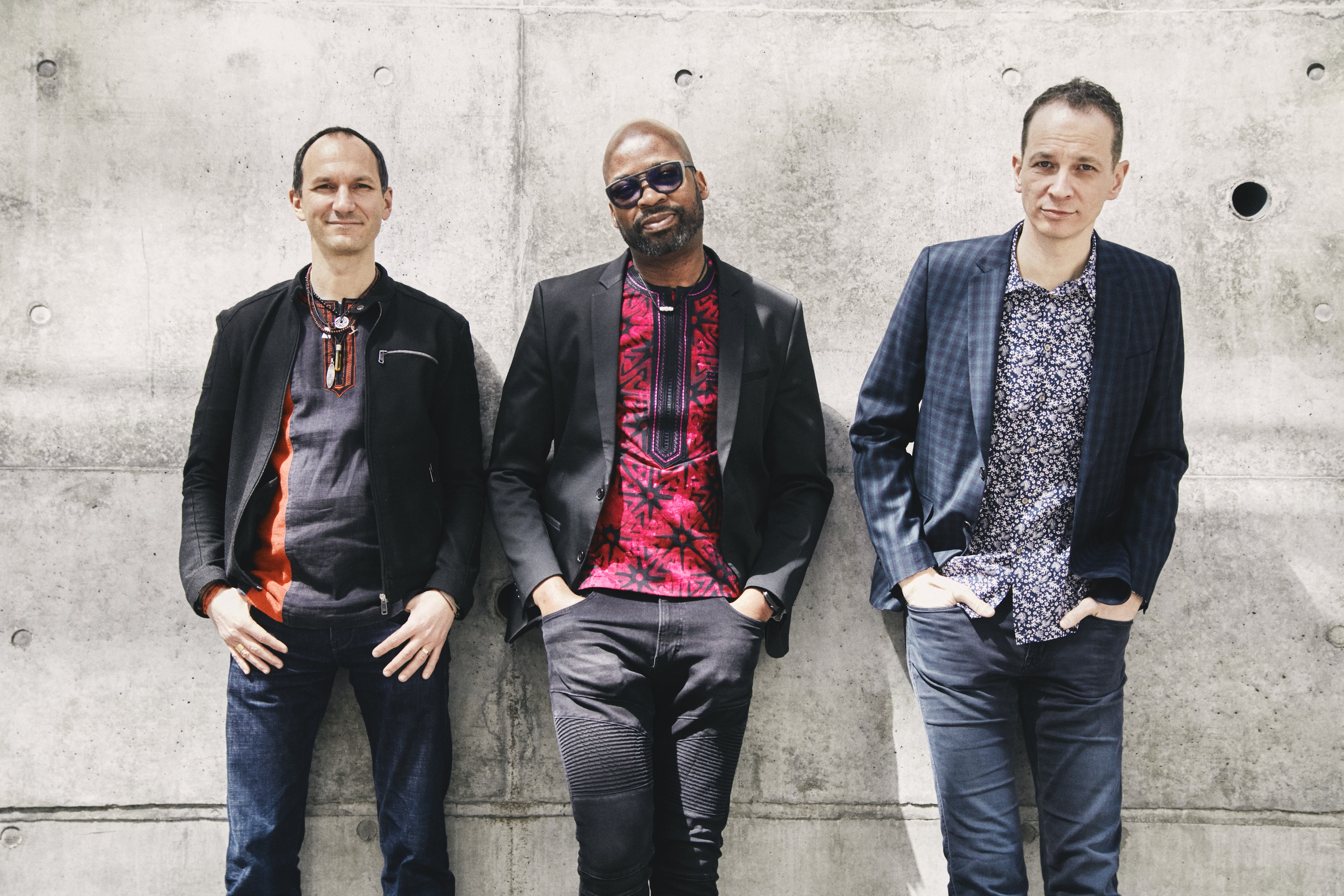

Background information
- Genres: Jazz
- Years active: 2005-present
- Labels: ObliqSound, sounderscore.com
- Members: Lionel Loueke; Ferenc Nemeth; Massimo Biolcati
- Website: gilfema.com

Gilfema is a jazz trio consisting of Lionel Loueke (guitar), Ferenc Nemeth (drums), and Massimo Biolcati (bass).

The name of the group comes from the musicians' names: Gil (Lionel Gilles Loueke), fe (Ferenc), ma (Massimo). They met at Berklee College of Music, coming from different backgrounds: Loueke from West Africa, Nemeth from Hungary, and Biolcati, an Italian born in Sweden. The same members form the Lionel Loueke Trio, the difference being that the Lionel Loueke Trio plays original music written by Loueke while Gilfema offers compositions by all three musicians.

After 20 years of playing together, the band is coming out with a fresh new recording in April 2020 under the collaborative moniker Gilfema again.

== Discography ==
- Gilfema (ObliqSound, 2005)
- Gilfema + 2, (ObliqSound, 2008) w/ guest clarinetists Anat Cohen and John Ellis
- Karibu, Lionel Loueke Trio, (Blue Note, 2008) w/ guests Herbie Hancock and Wayne Shorter
- Three (Sounderscore, 2020)
