= ObliqSound =

Record label in New York City

- Founded: 2002
- Founder: Tobias Tanner, Michele Locatelli, Ralf Schmid
- Genre: Jazz, electronic, avant-garde
- Country of origin: U.S.
- Location: New York City

ObliqSound is a record label in New York City.

== Background ==
It was founded by Tobias Tanner, Michele Locatelli, and Ralf Schmid. They studied music together at the New School in Manhattan. Their intent with Obliqsound is to produce musicians with a background in jazz whose music crosses genres. The roster includes Gilfema, which consists of Lionel Loueke, a guitarist from Benin; Massimo Biolcati, a Swedish-Italian bassist, and drummer Ferenc Nemeth from Hungary. Other atypical acts are Maori singer Tama Waipara and Flügelschlag!, a group from Germany which uses three pianos.

== Roster ==
- Aisha Duo
- Massimo Biolcati
- Ablaye Cissoko
- Anne Drummond
- Gilfema
- Luigi Bonafede
- Bebo Ferra
- Volker Goetze
- Lionel Loueke
- Grégoire Maret
- Andy Milne
- Grand Pianoramax
- Gretchen Parlato
- Paolino Dalla Porta
- Tobias Preisig
- Renovation Unlimited
- John Shannon
- Somi
- Tales in Tones Trio
- Tama Waipara
- Pietro Tonolo
- Max Wild
- Alon Yavnai

== Sub-labels ==
- Backdrop

== See also ==
- List of record labels
