= Lionel Loueke =

Beninese guitarist and vocalist

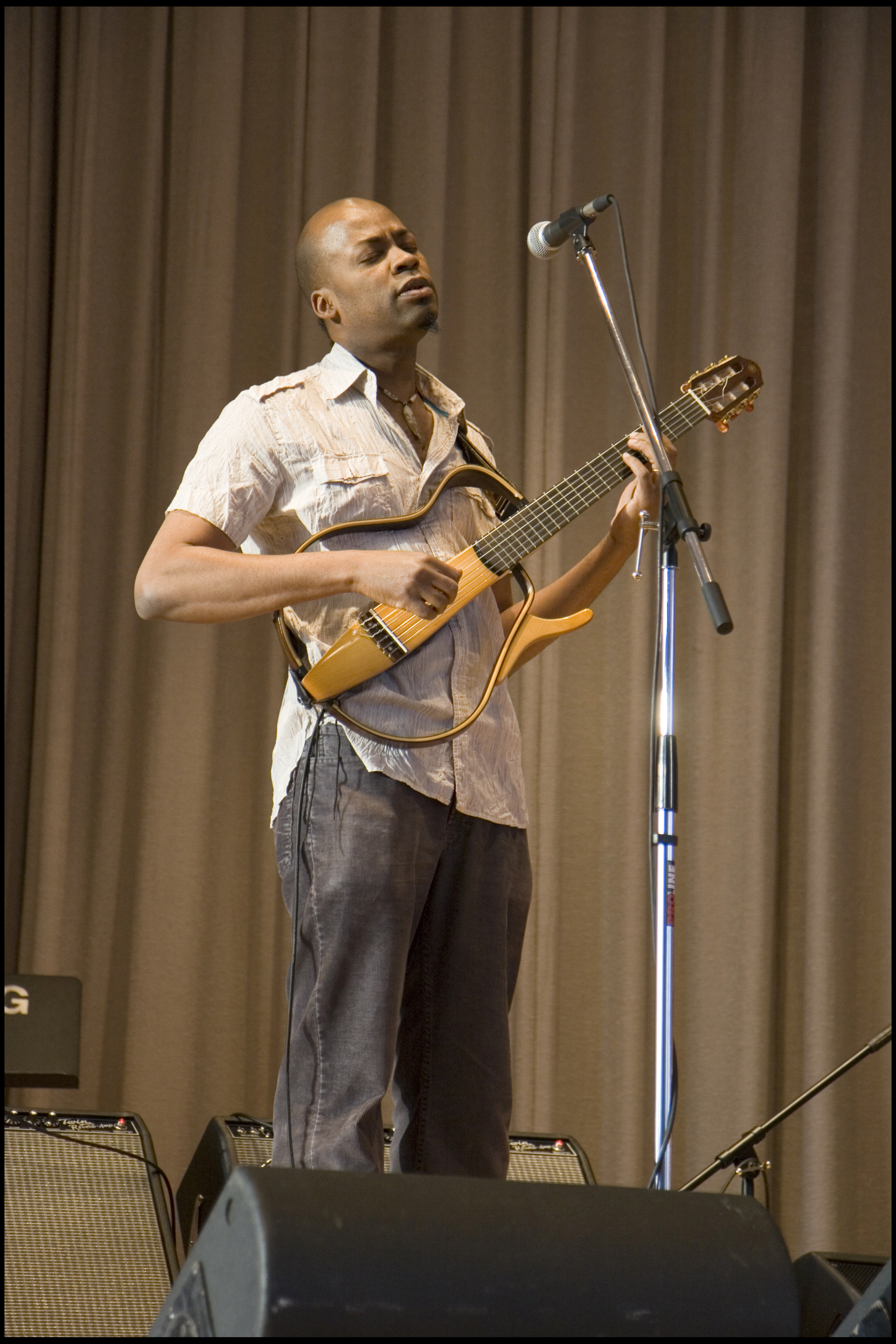
- Loueke playing a skeleton guitar in 2008

Background information
- Born: 27 April 1973 (age 53); Cotonou, Benin
- Genre: Jazz
- Occupations: Musician; singer
- Instrument: Guitar
- Years active: 2000–present
- Labels: ObliqSound; Blue Note
- Member of: Gilfema
- Website: lionellouekemusic.com

Lionel Loueke (/ˈliːoʊnɛl luːˈeɪkeɪ/; born 27 April 1973) is a guitarist and vocalist born in Benin. He moved to Ivory Coast in 1990 to study at the National Institute of Art.

== Biography ==
Loueke grew up in what he has described as a family of poor intellectuals in the West African country of Benin. He began playing percussion instruments at around the age of 9 but was influenced by an older brother who played guitar, which he began playing himself when he was seventeen. He listened to jazz guitarists like George Benson, Kenny Burrell, Joe Pass, and Wes Montgomery. It took Loueke a year to earn the $50 he needed to buy his first guitar. When he lacked money to buy new strings, which had to be bought across the border in Nigeria, he soaked the strings in vinegar to keep them clean. When the strings broke, he replaced them with bicycle brake cables, which damaged the neck of the guitar and compelled him to find a carpenter to fix it.

He studied at the National Institute of Art in Ivory Coast, the American School of Music in Paris from 1994 to 1998, Berklee College of Music from 1999 to 2001, and the Herbie Hancock Institute of Jazz (previously the Thelonious Monk Institute) from 2001 to 2003.

He got his first professional job by accident. At a club during a break, he took a guitar from the bandstand and started playing it. The club's manager heard him and offered him a job. He played African pop music, but he discovered jazz when a friend returned from Paris with a copy of an album by George Benson. This inspired Loueke to study jazz in Paris. He auditioned for the, then, Thelonious Monk Institute of Jazz at the University of California Los Angeles. He was selected in a worldwide search by a panel of judges, including jazz musicians Herbie Hancock, Terence Blanchard, and Wayne Shorter.

After UCLA, he appeared on Blanchard's albums Bounce (2003) and Flow (2005) and on Hancock's Possibilities (2006) and River: The Joni Letters (2007). He has also worked with Avishai Cohen, Charlie Haden, Angelique Kidjo, Francisco Mela, Gretchen Parlato, Kendrick Scott, Alison Wedding, Brian Blade, Terri Lyne Carrington, Dennis Chambers, Vinnie Colaiuta, Kenwood Dennard, Nathan East, Kenny Garrett, Michael Eckroth, George Garzone, Roy Hargrove, Magos Herrera, Bob Hurst, Alphonso Johnson, Marcus Miller, John Patitucci, Dianne Reeves, Santana, Sting, Jeff "Tain" Watts, and Cassandra Wilson.

He belongs to the trio Gilfema with Massimo Biolcati and Ferenc Nemeth. Both were his classmates at Berklee in Boston. Gilfema recorded the albums Gilfema (2005), and Gilfema + 2 (2008) for ObliqSound. As a solo act, Loueke recorded the live album In a Trance (2005) for Space Time Records and Virgin Forest (2006) for ObliqSound.

He made his major-label debut in 2008 when Blue Note released his album Karibu. NPR praised his fusion of African music with jazz harmonies, vocal inflections, and complex time signatures. The album includes Biolcati and Nemeth and guest appearances by Hancock and Shorter. His album Mwaliko (2010) is a collection of duo and trio performances that combines traditional West African music with jazz. Guests include Angélique Kidjo (a native of Benin), Richard Bona from Cameroon, and American musicians Marcus Gilmore and Esperanza Spalding. His 2012 album Heritage was released on Blue Note and was produced by Robert Glasper.

Loueke sings in Xhosa-inspired aspects, such as clicks (e.g., Nonvignon from Karibu). He doesn't speak Xhosa, and the singing is akin to scatting, having no linguistic meaning.

== Awards and honors ==
In early 2008, Loueke's "Kponnon Kpété" won Best Traditional World Song in the 7th Annual Independent Music Awards. Virgin Forest was nominated World Fusion Album of the year.

In 2009 he won a Fellow Award from United States Artists.

Loueke recorded with the Australian band The Vampires on their album The Vampires Meet Lionel Loueke. The album was nominated for the 2017 ARIA Music Award for Best Jazz Album.

== Discography ==
=== As leader/co-leader ===
- Incantation (self-released, 2004)
- In a Trance (Space Time, 2005)
- Virgin Forest (ObliqSound, 2006)
- Karibu (Blue Note, 2008)
- Mwaliko (Blue Note, 2010)
- Heritage (Blue Note, 2012)
- Gaïa (Blue Note, 2015)
- Hope with Kevin Hays (Newvelle, 2017)
- Obsession with Céline Rudolph (Obsessions, 2017)
- The Journey (Aparte, 2018)
- Close Your Eyes (Newvelle, 2018)
- HH (Edition, 2020)
- HH Reimagined with Gilles Peterson (Edition, 2023)
- Lean In with Gretchen Parlato (Edition, 2023)
- United with Dave Holland (Edition, 2024)

=== As a member ===
Gilfema with Ferenc Nemeth and Massimo Biolcati

- Gilfema (Obliqsound, 2005)
- Gilfema + 2 (Obliqsound, 2008)
- Three (Sounderscore, 2020)

Blue Note All Stars led by Robert Glasper

- Our Point of View (Blue Note, 2017)[2CD]

=== As sideman ===
With Jeff Ballard

- Time's Tales (Okeh, 2013)
- Fairgrounds (Edition, 2019)

With Terence Blanchard

- Bounce (Blue Note, 2003)
- Flow (Blue Note, 2005)
- Choices (Concord Jazz, 2009)
- Magnetic (Blue Note, 2013)

With Oran Etkin

- Kelenia (Motema, 2009)
- Gathering Light (Motema, 2014)

With Herbie Hancock

- Possibilities (Hear Music, 2005)
- River: The Joni Letters (Verve, 2007)
- The Imagine Project (Sony, 2010)

With Angelique Kidjo

- Djin Djin (Razor & Tie, 2007)
- Õÿö (Razor & Tie, 2010)
- Sings with the Orchestre Philharmonique du Luxembourg (429, 2015)
- Remain in Light (Kravenworks, 2018)

With Ferenc Nemeth

- Night Songs (Dreamers Collective, 2007)
- Triumph (Dreamers Collective, 2012)

With Gretchen Parlato

- Gretchen Parlato (self-released, 2005)
- In a Dream (Obliqsound, 2009)

With others

- Philip Bailey, Love Will Find a Way (Verve, 2019)
- Kenny Barron, The Traveler (Universal, 2008)
- Rhian Benson, Gold Coast (DKG, 2003)
- Massimo Biolcati, Persona (Obliqsound, 2008)
- Robi Botos, Old Soul (A440 Entertainment, 2018)
- Donald Brown, Fast Forward to the Past (Space Time, 2008)
- Jeff Coffin, Into the Air (Ear Up, 2012) – recorded in 2010
- Avishai Cohen, After the Big Rain (Anzic, 2007)
- Chick Corea & Steve Gadd, Chinese Butterfly (Stretch, 2017)
- Jack DeJohnette, Sound Travels (eOne, 2012)
- Tony Grey, Chasing Shadows (Abstract Logix, 2008)
- Charlie Haden, Land of the Sun (Verve, 2004)
- Miho Hazama, Dancer in Nowhere (Verve, 2018)
- Dave Holland, Aziza (Dare2, 2016)
- Norah Jones, ... Featuring Norah Jones (Blue Note, 2010)
- Nicolas Kummert, La Diversite (Edition, 2017)
- Takuya Kuroda, Rising Son (Blue Note, 2014)
- Eric Le Lann & Jannick Top, Le Lann Top (Nocturne, 2007)
- Joe Lovano, Cross Culture (Blue Note, 2013)
- Meeco, Souvenirs of Love (Double Moon, 2014)
- Francisco Mela, Cirio (Half Note, 2008)
- Laura Mvula, The Dreaming Room (Sony, 2016)
- Marius Neset, Circle of Chimes (ACT, 2017)
- Michel Portal, Bailador (Classics & Jazz, 2010)
- Gonzalo Rubalcaba, XXI Century 5 (Passion, 2011)[2CD]
- Robert Sadin, Art of Love (Deutsche Grammophon, 2009)
- Jacques Schwarz-Bart, Sone Ka-La (EmArcy, 2006)
- Kendrick Scott, The Source (World Culture Music, 2007)
- Kavita Shah, Visions (Naive, 2014)
- Elizabeth Shepherd, The Signal (Linus, 2014)
- Nate Smith, Kinfolk (Ropeadope, 2017)
- Walter Smith III, Casually Introducing (Fresh Sound, 2006)
- Somi, Red Soil in My Eyes (World Village, 2007)
- Omar Sosa, Eggun (Ota, 2013)
- Luboš Soukup Quartet, Země (Animal Music, 2017)
- Luciana Souza, Speaking in Tongues (Sunnyside, 2015)
- Esperanza Spalding, Radio Music Society (Heads Up, 2012)
- The Vampires, The Vampires Meet Lionel Loueke (Earshift, 2017)
- Florian Weber, Biosphere (Enja, 2012)
- Kenny Werner, Coalition (Half Note, 2014)
- Céline Rudolph, OBSESSION Duo Album (Obsessions, 2017)
