= Aaron Parks =

American jazz pianist

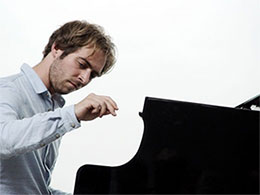
- Aaron Parks plays a duo concert with Adam Baldych in Aarhus, Denmark, in 2014.

Background information
- Born: October 7, 1983 (age 43); Seattle, Washington, U.S.
- Genre: Jazz
- Occupation: Musician
- Instrument: Piano
- Years active: 2001–present
- Labels: Blue Note, Nonesuch, ECM, Ropeadope
- Website: aaronparks.com

Aaron Parks (born October 7, 1983) is an American jazz pianist.

== Career ==
A native of Seattle, Parks studied at the University of Washington at the age of 14 through the Transition School and Early Entrance Program as a double major in computer science and music. At 15, he was selected to participate in the Grammy High School Jazz Ensembles which inspired him to move to New York City and transfer to the Manhattan School of Music. At Manhattan one of his teachers was Kenny Barron. During his final year, he began touring with Terence Blanchard's band, recording three albums with them for Blue Note, including the Grammy-winning A Tale of God's Will (A Requiem for Katrina). Parks can be heard on the soundtracks: Their Eyes Were Watching God and the Spike Lee and films: Inside Man, She Hate Me, and When the Levees Broke.

Parks released his first four albums on Keynote Records between 1999 and 2002. In 2008, he released Invisible Cinema, his debut for Blue Note. Following this, he released two albums for ECM, and is currently an artist on Ropeadope Records.

He is a member of the band James Farm with saxophonist Joshua Redman, bassist Matt Penman, and drummer Eric Harland. He has toured with guitarist Kurt Rosenwinkel.

== Awards and honors ==
- 2001: Cole Porter Fellow of the American Piano Awards
- 2006: Thelonious Monk International Jazz Piano Competition (third place)
- Jas Hennessy Piano Solo Competition at Montreux (third place)
- 2016: DownBeat magazine: “25 for the Future”

== Discography ==
=== As leader ===
Year recorded	Year released	Title	Label	Notes
1999	1999	The Promise	Keynote	Trio, with Evan Flory-Barnes (bass), Eric Peters (drums)
2000	2000	First Romance	Keynote	Trio, with Larry Holloway and Evan Flory-Barnes (bass; separately), Julian MacDonough and Eric Peters (drums; separately)
2001	2001	The Wizard	Keynote	Quintet, with Jay Thomas (trumpet, flugelhorn, tenor sax, soprano sax), Tim Green (alto sax), Jeff Johnson and Josh Ginsburg (bass; separately), Obed Calvaire (drums)
2002	2002	Shadows	Keynote	Some tracks trio, with Matt Brewer (bass), Obed Calvaire (drums); some tracks quartet, with Ambrose Akinmusire (trumpet) added
2008	2008	Invisible Cinema	Blue Note	Quartet, with Mike Moreno (guitar), Matt Penman (bass), Eric Harland (drums)
2011	2013	Arborescence	ECM	Solo piano
2012	2013	Alive in Japan	(Independent)	Trio, with Thomas Morgan (bass), RJ Miller (drums); in concert; digital download
2014	2016	Groovements	Stunt	Trio, with Thomas Fonnesbaek (bass), Karsten Bagge (drums)
2015	2017	Find the Way	ECM	Trio, with Ben Street (bass), Billy Hart (drums)
2018	2018	Little Big	Ropeadope	Most tracks quartet, with Greg Tuohey (guitar), David Ginyard (bass), Tommy Crane (drums); some tracks with Eliot Krimsky (keyboards) added
2019	2020	Little Big II: Dreams of a Mechanical Man	Ropeadope	Quartet, with Greg Tuohey (guitar), David Ginyard, Jr (bass), Tommy Crane (drums, percussion)
2021	2022	Volume One	(Independent)	Trio, with Matt Brewer (bass), Eric Harland (drums); digital download
2021	2022	Volume Two	(Independent)	Trio, with Matt Brewer (bass), Eric Harland (drums); digital download
2023	2023	Live in Berlin	(Independent)	Quartet, with Greg Tuohey (guitar), David Ginyard, Jr (bass), Jongkuk Kim (drums); digital download
2024	2024	Little Big III	Blue Note	Quartet, with Greg Tuohey (guitar), David Ginyard (bass), Jongkuk Kim (drums)
2025	2025	By All Means	Blue Note	Quartet, with Ben Solomon (tenor saxophone); Ben Street (bass); Billy Hart (drums)

Main sources:

=== As member ===
James Farm
With Joshua Redman, Matt Penman and Eric Harland

- James Farm (Nonesuch, 2011)
- City Folk (Nonesuch, 2014)

=== As sideman ===
With Terence Blanchard

- Bounce (Blue Note, 2003)
- Flow (Blue Note, 2005) – recorded in 2004
- A Tale of God's Will (A Requiem for Katrina) (Blue Note, 2007)

With Mike Moreno

- Between the Lines (World Culture Music, 2007) – recorded in 2006
- First in Mind (Criss Cross, 2011)
- Another Way (World Culture Music, 2012)
- Lotus (World Culture Music, 2015)

With Christian Scott

- Anthem (Concord Jazz, 2007)
- Live at Newport (Concord Jazz, 2008) – live

With Dayna Stephens

- Today Is Tomorrow (Criss Cross, 2012)
- Reminiscent (Criss Cross, 2015)
- Right Now! (Contagious Music, 2020)

With others

- Walter Smith III, Casually Introducing (Fresh Sound, 2006)
- Ferenc Nemeth, Night Songs (Dreamers Collective 2007) – recorded in 2005
- Ambrose Akinmusire, Prelude (Fresh Sound, 2008)
- Gretchen Parlato, In a Dream (ObliqSound, 2009) – recorded in 2008
- Francesco Cafiso, Angelica (CAM Jazz, 2009)
- Anders Christensen Trio, Dear Someone (Stunt, 2009)
- Monika Borzym, Girl Talk (Sony, 2011)
- Cant, Dreams Come True (Terrible, 2011)
- Kurt Rosenwinkel, Star of Jupiter (Wommusic 2012)[2CD]
- Yeahwon Shin, Lua Ya (ECM, 2013) – recorded in 2012
- Derrick Hodge, Live Today (Blue Note, 2013)
- Lage Lund, Foolhardy (Criss Cross, 2013)
- Chris Morrissey, North Hero (Sunnyside, 2013)
- Nir Felder, Golden Age (Okeh, 2014)
- Dhafer Youssef, Diwan of Beauty and Odd (Okeh, 2016)
- Gilad Hekselman, Ask for Chaos (Motema, 2018)
- Ben Wendel, The Seasons (Motema, 2018)
- Terri Lyne Carrington, Waiting Game (Motema, 2019)
- Evgeny Pobozhiy, Elements For Peace (Butman Music, 2022)
- Joshua Redman, Where Are We (Blue Note, 2023)
- Nils Wülker, Zuversicht (Warner Music, 2026)
