= Heritage (Lionel Loueke album) =

Studio album by Lionel Loueke
- Released: 5 June 2012
- Studio: Brooklyn Recording
- Genre: Jazz
- Length: 61:59
- Label: Blue Note 509993 27742 2 1
- Producer: Lionel Loueke, Robert Glasper

Lionel Loueke chronology
Mwaliko (2010)	Heritage (2012)	Gaïa (2015)

Professional ratings
Review scores
Source	Rating
All About Jazz	4/5 stars
Financial Times	4/5 stars
The Guardian	4/5 stars
Jazz Forum	4.5/5 stars
Jazzwise	4/5 stars
PopMatters	7/10
Tom Hull	B

Heritage is a studio album by Beninese guitarist Lionel Loueke recorded with Derrick Hodge on bass, Mark Guiliana on drums, Robert Glasper on keyboards, and Gretchen Parlato performing vocals. Blue Note released the album on 5 June 2012.

== Reception ==
John Fordham of The Guardian wrote: "There's more to this world-jazz encounter between African and American sounds than its melliflously ethereal, borderline-smooth vocals first suggest." Franz A. Matzner of All About Jazz noted: " What makes Heritage stand out is the natural intimacy of its approach and the organic delivery by a cadre of musicians whose youth, unique talents, and diverse backgrounds place them at the crossroads of today's music." Chris Cooke of KIOS-FM added: "The fusion of West African & jazz musical traditions is impeccably achieved in the latest recording from guitarist Lionel Loueke. "Heritage" creates a sonic landscape that is contemplative and graceful. Steered by the guitar artistry of Loeuke, the warmth of the program is hard to resist."

== Track listing ==
All tracks are written by Lionel Loueke except where noted.

No.	Title	Writer(s)	Length
1.	"Ifê"		7:37
2.	"Ouidah"		6:23
3.	"Tribal Dance"	Robert Glasper	7:14
4.	"Hope"	Robert Glasper, Lionel Loueke	7:34
5.	"Freedom Dance"		4:40
6.	"Goree"		3:41
7.	"African Ship"		2:47
8.	"Farafina"		5:29
9.	"Chardon"		6:12
10.	"Bayyinah"	Robert Glasper	9:24
Total length:			61:59

== Personnel ==
- Lionel Loueke – guitars, vocals
- Derrick Hodge – bass
- Gretchen Parlato – vocals
- Mark Guiliana – drums
- Robert Glasper – keyboards, piano, producing
