= Obsession (Lionel Loueke album) =

Studio album by Lionel Loueke and Céline Rudolph
- Released: 3 November 2017
- Recorded: 2013 and 2015
- Studio: A-Trane Studio (Berlin); Brooklyn Recording (NYC)
- Genre: Jazz
- Length: 47:00
- Label: Obsessions
- Producer: Lionel Loueke, Céline Rudolph

Lionel Loueke chronology
Hope (2017)	Obsession (2017)	The Journey (2018)

Obsession is a studio collaborative album by Beninese guitarist Lionel Loueke and German jazz singer Céline Rudolph. The album won German Echo Jazz prize and nomination for the annual German Record Critics’ List in 2018. In 2019, Rudolph invited Loueke to record her album Pearls. In 2018, Rudolph and Loueke toured seven West African countries with the album on behalf of the Goethe-Institut.

== Reception ==
A reviewer of Deutschlandfunk Kultur wrote: "This duo, which sounds at least like a band, sometimes even like an orchestra, plays and sings wonderful favorite songs, sometimes in English, sometimes in French, sometimes in their own invented language. In a live setting, it becomes clear that each album is just a snapshot in time. What's crucial is that the music evolves and reinvents itself with every concert."

== Track listing ==
No.	Title	Writer(s)	Length
1.	"C'est Un Love Song"	Rudolph	4:32
2.	"New Day"	Rudolph	5:30
3.	"Veuve Malienne"	Loueke	6:56
4.	"Archaïc"	Rudolph	5:02
5.	"Here Comes the Rain"	Rudolph	5:33
6.	"O Leãozinho"	Caetano Veloso	3:55
7.	"Morning Blues"	Rudolph	5:23
8.	"Le Vent Du Nord"	Rudolph	3:51
9.	"Fábula"	Rudolph	3:32
10.	"Rêve Obsession"	Loueke, Rudolph	3:44
Total length:			47:00

== Personnel ==
- Céline Rudolph – voice, acoustic guitar, glockenspiel, kalimba, producing
- Lionel Loueke – acoustic guitar, electric guitar, voice, producing
