= HH (album) =

Studio album by Lionel Loueke
- Released: 16 October 2020
- Recorded: 13–15 February 2019
- Studios: Artesuono produzioni musicali & recording studios Cavalicco, Udine, Italy
- Genre: Jazz
- Length: 53:30
- Label: Edition EDN-1161
- Producers: Massimo Biolcati, Lionel Loueke

Lionel Loueke chronology
Close Your Eyes (2018)	HH (2020)	HH Reimagined (2023)

Professional ratings
Review scores
Source	Rating
All About Jazz	4/5 stars
Jazzwise	4/5 stars
Mojo	4/5 stars
Tom Hull	B+

HH is a studio album by Beninese guitarist Lionel Loueke. Edition released the album on 16 October 2020.

== Background ==
The album was recorded in Udine, Italy and contains 14 tracks: 12 written by Loueke's mentor Herbie Hancock and two by Loueke himself. In the official Edition's review Loueke explained: "I have been playing with The Master Herbie Hancock for more than 15 years, and still it wasn’t easy to work on his music because the originals are already so beautiful and he keeps developing them every time we play on stage. The challenge was to put my own imprints on these masterpieces. To rethink them with my touch on it. He is my mentor and I feel very lucky to be part of his musical journey. It’s a gift to learn that much from him – humanly, spiritually and musically speaking."

== Reception ==
Ian Patterson of All About Jazz wrote: "Homage to jazz greats is part of the idiom's codified language, but with this primarily acoustic set Loueke pays tribute in a way that Hancock would surely appreciate, by building on what has gone before. From lyricism of caressing tenderness, and danceable African funk to contemporary soundscapes, HH translates Hancock's music into a singular, engrossing hybrid that could only hail from LL."

== Track listing ==
All tracks are written by Herbie Hancock except track 10 and 13 written by Loueke.

No.	Title	Length
1.	"Hang Up You Hang Ups"	3:20
2.	"Driftin'"	2:59
3.	"Tell Me a Bedtime Story"	4:47
4.	"Actual Proof"	3:03
5.	"Cantaloupe Island"	4:03
6.	"Butterfly"	3:28
7.	"Dolphin Dance"	4:30
8.	"Watermelon Man"	5:03
9.	"Come Running to Me"	4:40
10.	"Voyage Maiden"	3:45
11.	"Rockit"	3:28
12.	"Speak Like a Child"	3:09
13.	"Homage to HH"	4:08
14.	"One Finger Snap"	3:07
Total length:		53:30

== Personnel ==
- Lionel Loueke – guitar & vocals
