= Karibu (album) =

Studio album by Lionel Loueke
- Released: 25 March 2008
- Recorded: September 2007
- Studio: Bennett Studios, NJ
- Genre: Jazz
- Length: 62:13
- Label: Blue Note
- Producer: Eli Wolf

Lionel Loueke chronology
Virgin Forest (2006)	Karibu (2008)	Mwaliko (2010)

Professional ratings
Review scores
Source	Rating
All About Jazz	4.5/5 stars
AllMusic	3.5/5 stars
The Guardian	3/5 stars
laut.de	5/5 stars
Tom Hull	B+

Karibu is a studio album by Beninese guitarist Lionel Loueke. Blue Note released the album on 25 March 2008. This is the Loueke's first album for Blue Note.

== Reception ==
John L. Walters of The Guardian wrote: "Karibu is Loueke's first major-label album after several indie recordings, yet it isn't the classic his admirers hoped for; perhaps he needs a producer to pull together all those diverse threads. Fortunately, there are many details to treasure, such as a delicious reading of Skylark, and the asymmetric rhythms of Benny's Tune. Not to mention a version of Coltrane's Naima - featuring the magnificent Wayne Shorter - that is worth the price of the album alone."

== Track listing ==
All tracks are written by Lionel Loueke except where noted.

No.	Title	Writer(s)	Length
1.	"Karibu"		6:50
2.	"Seven Teens"	Loueke, Herbie Hancock	6:55
3.	"Skylark"	Hoagy Carmichael, Johnny Mercer	6:46
4.	"Zala"		6:30
5.	"Naima"	John Coltrane	7:04
6.	"Benny's Tune"		6:06
7.	"Light Dark"		10:10
8.	"Agbannon Blues"		6:03
9.	"Nonvignon"		5:41
10.	"Body and Soul"	Edward Heyman, Frank Eyton, Johnny Green, Robert Sour	6:32
Total length:			62:13

== Personnel ==
Loueke's Trio

- Lionel Loueke – guitars, vocals
- Massimo Biolcati – bass
- Ferenc Nemeth – drums

Guest artists

- Herbie Hancock – piano (tracks 2 7)
- Wayne Shorter – soprano sax (tracks 5 7)
