= Bounce (Terence Blanchard album) =

Studio album by Terence Blanchard
- Released: August 5, 2003
- Recorded: February 16–19, 2003
- Studios: Avatar, New York City
- Genres: Jazz, post-bop
- Length: 67:34
- Label: Blue Note
- Producers: Terence Blanchard, Michael Cuscuna

Terence Blanchard chronology
Let's Get Lost (2001)	Bounce (2003)	Flow (2005)

Professional ratings
Review scores
Source	Rating
AllMusic	4.5/5 stars
Billboard	(Positive)
Jazz Review	(Positive)
MSN	4.5/5 stars
The Penguin Guide to Jazz	3.5/4 stars
Tom Hull	B+

Bounce is a 2003 jazz album by an American jazz musician Terence Blanchard, released by Blue Note Records.

== Background ==
Bounce is the Blue Note recording debut of trumpeter and composer Terence Blanchard. The album is a mix of the sounds of Africa, Brazil and America, with the styles of swing, hard bop, free form, groove and early 70's fusion. The Grammy Award winner Terence Blanchard is the musician who in the 1980s played the trumpet for bands led by jazz luminaries Lionel Hampton and Art Blakey. Blanchard also wrote music scores for films such as Spike Lee's Jungle Fever (1991), Clockers (1995), 4 Little Girls (1997), 25th Hour (2003), and the highly acclaimed Malcolm X (1992).

== Reception ==
Thom Jurek of AllMusic stated "Remarkable. Ultimately, Bounce is the most perfectly paced of all of Blanchard's recordings. He divides his time between tempos, but always comes back to silence to ground himself and begin over. In terms of his lyrical lines, they have never been in a sense more simple or more sophisticated (check out the blissed-out harmonics in "Innocence"), where the individual players become identified by their ensemble contributions first and then as soloists. Mr. Blanchard's own soling has never been more restrained or more profound. In his economy of phrase, entire sound worlds become evident that were never noticeable before. On Bounce, Blanchard proves that he is the trumpet player, composer, and bandleader who is moving jazz, albeit at his own pace, in new directions that encompass both a new look at Western musical systems and never leave the human heart out of the equation. This is his masterpiece thus far and a high-water mark for anybody else to follow."

John Murph of JazzTimes noted 'For the most, on Bounce, Blanchard leads an ensemble that recalls those of one of his mentors, Art Blakey... Ultimately though, it’s Blanchard, who shines brightest. His succinct solos are always filled with the right amount of rhythmic crackle and subtle nuance. Whether he’s firing off searing notes that seem to scrap the clouds, as on “On the Verge,” “Azania” or “Fred Brown,” or lowering the flames to candlelight flicker as on “Nocturna,” his solos gleam with clarity, emotional poignancy and rhythmic punch. In other words, they bounce."

== Track listing ==
No.	Title	Writer(s)	Length
1.	"On the Verge"	Aaron Parks	8:43
2.	"Passionate Courage"	Blanchard	6:32
3.	"Fred Brown"	Blanchard	7:42
4.	"Nocturna"	Ivan Lins, Vítor Martins	7:33
5.	"Azania"	Blanchard	6:04
6.	"Footprints"	Wayne Shorter	7:31
7.	"Transform"	Eric Harland	9:00
8.	"Innocence"	Brandon Owens	7:23
9.	"Bounce / Let's Go Off"	Blanchard, D. Harrison	7:06
Total length:			67:34

== Personnel ==
- Terence Blanchard – trumpet
- Lionel Loueke – vocals, guitar
- Brice Winston – soprano saxophone, tenor saxophone
- Aaron Parks – piano
- Robert Glasper – Hammond B-3 and Fender Rhodes
- Brandon Owens – bass
- Eric Harland – drums

== Chart performance ==
Chart (2003)	Peak position
US Traditional Jazz Albums (Billboard)	13
Billboard 200	34
