= Hope (Lionel Loueke and Kevin Hays album) =

Studio album by Lionel Loueke and Kevin Hays
- Released: June 2017
- Recorded: 6-7 September 2016
- Studio: East Side Sound (NYC)
- Genre: Jazz
- Length: 54:35
- Label: Newvelle NV008LP; Edition EDN1133
- Producer: Elan Mehler, Jean-Christophe Morisseau

Lionel Loueke chronology
Gaïa (2015)	Hope (2017)	Obsession (2017)

Professional ratings
Review scores
Source	Rating
All About Jazz	4.5/5 stars
DownBeat	4/5 stars
Financial Times	3/5 stars
Jazzwise	4/5 stars

Hope is a studio collaborative album by Beninese guitarist Lionel Loueke and American jazz pianist Kevin Hays.

== Background ==
The album was initially released as a vinyl pressing by Newvelle Records in Europe in 2017. Nonetheless, a slot with Edition Records offered both musiscians a chance to revisit the work and give it a wider release in 2019.

== Reception ==
Geno Thackara of All About Jazz wrote: "It would have been easy to leave well enough alone. Kevin Hays and Lionel Loueke made a delightful recording the first time around—a most happy clash of hemispheres blending urban jazz and world-folk balladry, crossing upbeat piano with lively scat-singing, frisky African rhythm play and much more." Kevin Le Gendre of Jazzwise stated: "Established bandleaders and in-demand sidemen, pianist Hays and guitarist Loueke, make a formidable combination. They strike a good balance in terms of both the number of songs each contributes to this set and the solo space allocated on every piece, so that the performance feels like much more of a union than a negotiation for centre stage, as can sometimes be the case if the players are lacking real chemistry."

== Track listing ==
per release via Edition
No.	Title	Writer(s)	Length
1.	"Violeta"	Hays	5:09
2.	"Hope"	Loueke	6:11
3.	"Aziza Dance"	Loueke	4:48
4.	"Feuilles-O"	Traditional	5:23
5.	"Milton"	Hays	6:56
6.	"Twins"	Loueke	3:36
7.	"Veuve Mailenne"	Loueke	5:20
8.	"All I Have"	Hays	4:49
9.	"Ghana Boy"	Loueke	3:58
10.	"Loving You"	Hays	3:54
11.	"Sweet Caroline"	Hays	4:17
Total length:			54:35

== Personnel ==
- Kevin Hays – vocals, piano
- Lionel Loueke – guitar, vocals
