= Jahari Stampley =

Chicago-born pianist, songwriter, and musical arranger (born 1999)

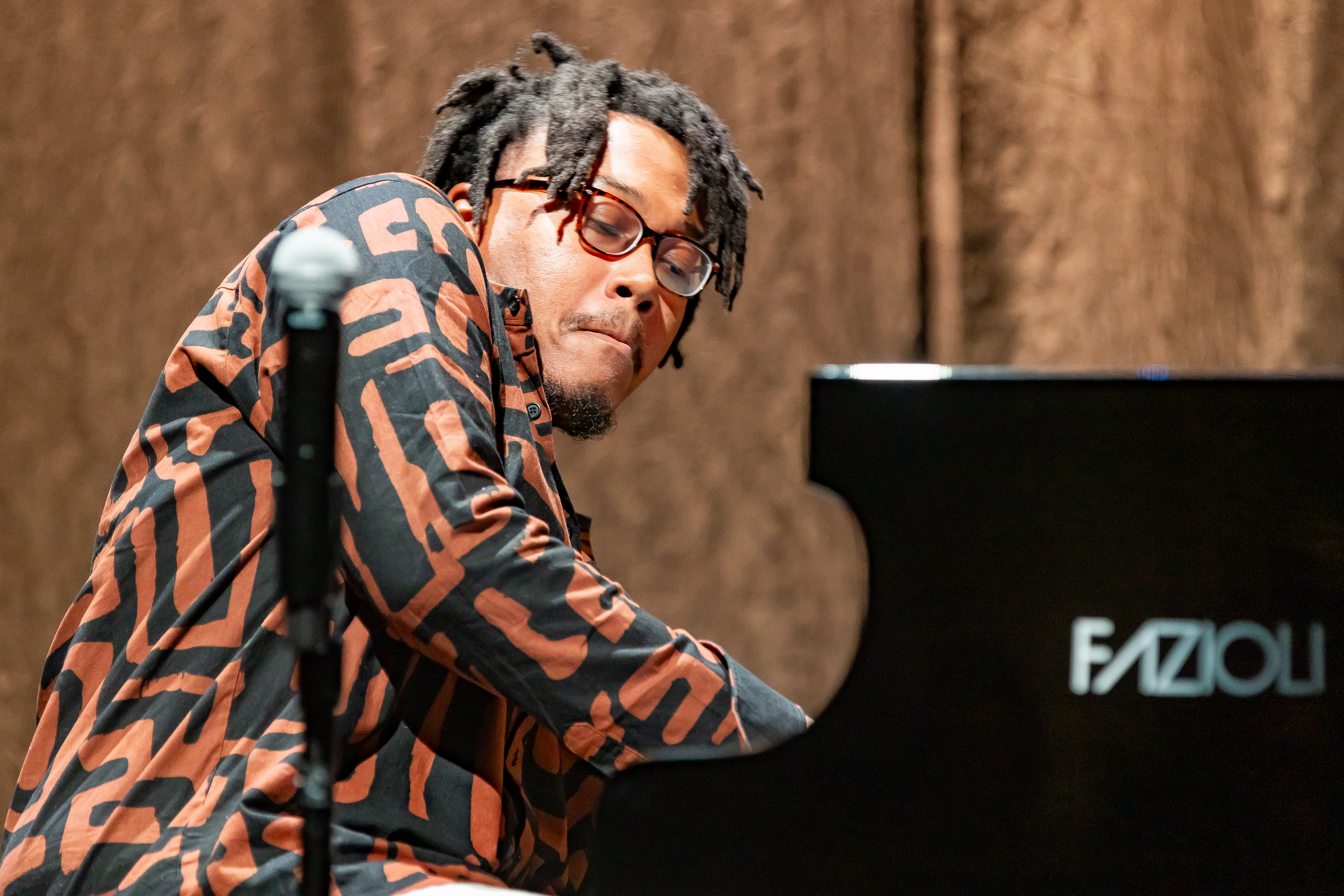
- Stampley at the Herbie Hancock Institute International Jazz Competition (2023)

Background information
- Born: July 19, 1999 (age 27); Chicago, Illinois
- Genres: Jazz, gospel, pop
- Occupations: pianist, composer, and bandleader
- Website: jaharistampley.com

Jahari Stampley (born July 19, 1999) is a Chicago-born pianist, composer, and bandleader. In 2023, at age 24, Stampley won the Herbie Hancock Institute International Piano Competition, one of the most prestigious awards in jazz. He has been featured in the New York Times, BBC, Jazzwise, NPR, and Chicago Tribune, and is widely considered as one of the leading emerging talents in contemporary jazz and free jazz. Stampley is endorsed by Yamaha and Rhodes piano.

== Early life ==
Jahari Stampley was born and raised in Chicago, Illinois, in a family of musicians. His mother, D-Erania Stampley is a Grammy nominated multi-instrumentalist, bandleader, and songwriter. Stampley started out on drums but later switched to the piano at age 14, teaching himself to play by ear. In 2017 he was a member of CYSO Jazz Orchestra's season. Two years later he won the Bösendorfer prize in the international American Jazz Pianists Association Competition (for ages 18–25). Stampley graduated from the Manhattan School of Music in 2021. In 2023 he was named Chicagoan of the Year in Jazz and became the first non-classical musician to receive the Chicago Youth Symphony Alumni Award.

== Career ==
He became widely known among jazz fans in 2023, when he won the Herbie Hancock Institute of Jazz International Piano Competition. That year he also released his debut album Still Listening, which rose to #1 on Apple iTunes Jazz charts within the first weeks of its release.

By the age of 18, he was recognized and followed by many world-renowned musicians including Jill Scott, Robert Glasper, Cory Henry, and Jacob Collier, among others. He later toured with Stanley Clarke and is featured on Derrick Hodge’s Color of Noise album. In 2023, Jahari was selected to perform in the UNESCO International Jazz Day at the Palace of Arts and Culture in Tangier, Morocco, alongside jazz legends including Herbie Hancock, Marcus Miller, Dee Dee Bridgewater, Melody Gardot, Femi Kuti, and others.

In an interview with Jazzwise, Herbie Hancock remarked, "I haven't seen anybody with technique like that, ever. I thought I was looking at Art Tatum’s second coming, in a more modern form. He is just an amazing talent.”

In 2024, Stampley played piano and keyboards on Keyon Harrold's Foreverland, which was nominated for best alternative jazz album in the 67th Grammy awards. Since launching his own family trio, Stampley has toured around the world with Miguel Russell, a 21-year-old drummer/producer from South Florida, and his mother D-Erania Stampley, playing in iconic venues such as Radio City Music Hall in NYC, Carnegie Hall, the Kennedy Center, the Met Philadelphia, SFJazz Center, and other prestigious clubs in the UK, Switzerland, Germany, China, and Japan, including Ronnie Scott's Jazz Club and Blue Note Jazz Club.

== Awards and achievements ==
- ASCAP Herb Albert Composers Award (2025)
- Luminarts Writers Award for What A Time Album (2025)
- Chicagoan of the Year in Jazz (2023)
- Honoree of Chicago Symphony Orchestra (2023)
- Winner of Herbie Hancock Institute International Jazz Piano Competition (2023)
- Winner of Bösendorferprize in the international American Jazz Pianists Association Competition (2019)

== Discography ==
=== Albums ===
- Still Listening (2023)
- What A Time (2025)
