= Close Your Eyes (Lionel Loueke album) =

Studio album by Lionel Loueke
- Released: 22 October 2018
- Recorded: 23 September 2017
- Studio: Eastside Sound, NYC
- Genre: Jazz
- Length: 59:53
- Label: Newvelle NV015LP
- Producer: Lionel Loueke

Lionel Loueke chronology
The Journey (2018)	Close Your Eyes (2018)	HH (2020)

Professional ratings
Review scores
Source	Rating
All About Jazz	4/5 stars
Jazzwise	4/5 stars
Financial Times	4/5 stars
Tom Hull	B+

Close Your Eyes is a studio album by Beninese guitarist Lionel Loueke recorded with Reuben Rogers and Eric Harland. Newvelle released the album on 22 October 2018. The album includes eight jazz standards and was recorded on a one-day break between a tour with Chick Corea and a tour with Herbie Hancock.

== Reception ==
Steve Provizer of The Arts Fuse wrote: "The sensation I was left with after listening to Close Your Eyes is that I’d heard something new, but not jarringly so. The broad outlines of the music are familiar, but the landscape is fresh and rejuvenating. Loueke is a unique voice, who has managed to bring a number of influences together without weakening or undermining any of them." Karl Ackermann of All About Jazz stated: "For the most part the standards chosen by Loueke wouldn't be a compelling enticement after being covered and manipulated by scores of artists, but the guitarist has a quirky and surprising touch that would make even the most threadbare composition seem current. Equally idiosyncratic—when warranted—Rogers and Harland add charming inflections throughout these pieces, keeping the ears on alert for this superb rhythm section."

== Track listing ==
No.	Title	Writer(s)	Length
1.	"Footprints"	Wayne Shorter	6:06
2.	"It Might As Well Be Spring"	Rodgers and Hammerstein	6:42
3.	"Moon River"	Johnny Mercer, Henry Mancini	4:18
4.	"Solar"	Miles Davis	5:07
5.	"Blue Monk"	Thelonious Monk	6:27
6.	"Body and Soul"	Edward Heyman, Frank Eyton, Robert Sour, Johnny Green	4:40
7.	"Close Your Eyes"	Bernice Petkere	7:46
8.	"Naima"	John Coltrane	3:38
Total length:			59:53

== Personnel ==
- Lionel Loueke – guitar & vocals
- Reuben Rogers – acoustic bass
- Eric Harland – drums
