= In a Trance =

Studio album by Lionel Loueke
- Released: 31 October 2005
- Recorded: 2005
- Genre: Jazz
- Length: 51:21
- Label: Space Time Records
- Producer: Lionel Loueke

Lionel Loueke chronology
Incantation (2004)	In a Trance (2005)	Virgin Forest (2006)

Professional ratings
Review scores
Source	Rating
All About Jazz	4/5 stars

In a Trance is a studio album by Beninese guitarist Lionel Loueke. The record was released on 31 October 2005 by Space Time.

== Reception ==
John Kelman of All About Jazz wrote: "Intimate and revealing of a mind that views stylistic barriers as artifices to be dissolved, In a Trance demonstrates in the most musical way just how seamlessly technology can integrated. Loueke may have but one voice and one instrument, but in their surprising variety and orchestration, he makes clear why he's become so widely in demand in such a short period of time."

== Track listing ==
All tracks are written by Lionel Loueke.

No.	Title	Length
1.	"A Prayer for Peace"	5:23
2.	"Benny's Tune"	0:51
3.	"In a Trance"	4:07
4.	"Mivakpola"	5:45
5.	"Gbeto"	2:46
6.	"Fifa"	4:58
7.	"Nagbe"	1:24
8.	"Okagbe"	4:45
9.	"Be-Nin-Bop"	7:04
10.	"Boum Boum!!!"	3:44
11.	"Always Will Be"	4:07
12.	"Nonvignon"	5:27
Total length:		51:21

== Personnel ==
- Lionel Loueke – guitars, vocals, producing
- Christian Kaufmann – engineering, mixing
