= United (Lionel Loueke and Dave Holland album) =

Studio album by Lionel Loueke and Dave Holland
- Released: 8 November 2024
- Recorded: 8–9 August 2023
- Studios: NRS, Catskill, NY
- Genre: Jazz
- Length: 65:07
- Labels: Edition; EDNLP1249
- Producers: Dave Holland, Lionel Loueke

Lionel Loueke chronology
Lean In (2023)	United (2024)

Dave Holland chronology
Another Land (2021)	United (2024)

Professional ratings
Review scores
Source	Rating
All About Jazz	4/5 stars
Jazzwise	4/5 stars
Tom Hull	B+

United is a studio collaborative album by Beninese guitarist and vocalist Lionel Loueke and English jazz bassist Dave Holland. The album was released on 8 November 2024 by Edition Records.

== Background ==
The album includes 11 tracks: 10 written by Loueke and one by Wayne Shorter—after which the album is named. The origin of United is as organic and unplanned as the music it contains. Emerging from a spontaneous improvisation during a soundcheck, the album captures the deep, intuitive rapport between the two musicians. Holland recalls: "It was one of those rare moments where everything clicked. Lionel and I were improvising, and suddenly it wasn’t just sound—it was something bigger. I turned to him and said, ‘We have to do this.’"

== Critical reception ==
Ian Patterson of All About Jazz wrote: "While the pair have played together in various settings, they had never performed as a duo—until an impromptu jam during a soundcheck. Happily, they clicked musically, and a seed was sewn. United is the very tasty fruit of their encounter... There is no doubt that there is strength, and beauty, in unity. This album speaks eloquently to that truth. Loueke and Holland share another connection."

John Fordham of Jazzwise stated: "Bass legend Dave Holland recalls that the spark for this beautiful dialogue with the Benin-born guitarist/vocalist Lionel Loueke sprang from an unrelated soundcheck in which they began improvising together and immediately realised they had happened on a dialogue packed with stories to come."

== Track listing ==
All tracks are written by Lionel Loueke, except as noted.

No.	Title	Writer(s)	Length
1.	"Essaouira"		5:04
2.	"Pure Thought"		6:51
3.	"Tranxit"		5:39
4.	"Chant"		6:23
5.	"Celebration"		5:42
6.	"Stranger in a Mirror"		8:28
7.	"Yaoundé"		5:29
8.	"Life Goes On"		5:02
9.	"Hideland"		6:32
10.	"Humanism"		4:33
11.	"United"	Wayne Shorter	5:24
Total length:			65:07

== Personnel ==
- Lionel Loueke – guitar, vocals, producing
- Dave Holland – double bass, producing
