= Flow (Terence Blanchard album) =

Studio album by Terence Blanchard
- Released: June 7, 2005
- Recorded: December 11–14, 2004
- Studio: Jim Henson Studios, Los Angeles
- Genre: Jazz, post-bop
- Label: Blue Note; Blue Note 78273
- Producer: Herbie Hancock

Terence Blanchard chronology
Bounce (2003)	Flow (2005)	A Tale of God's Will (2007)

Professional ratings
Review scores
Source	Rating
Allmusic	3.5/5 stars
The Guardian	4/5 stars
Billboard	(Positive)
The Washington Post	(Positive)
All About Jazz	4/5 stars
PopMatters	7/10
The Penguin Guide to Jazz	3.5/4 stars
Tom Hull	B

Flow is a studio album by American jazz trumpeter Terence Blanchard, released on June 7, 2005 by Blue Note Records. The album was nominated for a "Best Jazz Instrumental Album" Grammy Award in 2005.

== Background ==
This disc is imbued with a dark-hued melancholy that really comes to the fore on a pair of elegant, shape-shifting ballads—"Benny's Tune", featuring Hancock on piano, and "Over There".

== Reception ==
Mike Joyce of The Washington Post stated "Flow, Blanchard's new CD, is proof that those salutary effects haven't worn off despite some personnel changes. A worthy follow-up to the ensemble's previous release, Bounce, Flow is more multifaceted than its title suggests, embracing modal harmonic forms as well as flat-out swing, southern soul grooves and West African beats, acoustic textures and synth-triggered shadings. The title cut, though, serves as the album's spine. Divided into three parts and punctuated by other performances, it finds the ensemble pared to a quartet, exploring everything from clattering blues to brassy exultations and Crescent City funk. JazzTimes review by Nate Chinen observed, "Blanchard has crafted a stirring and soulful contemporary outing and one of the strongest albums of his distinguished career. Flow is, start to finish, an ensemble effort. Each of Blanchard’s musicians plays a critical role in the group’s expansive sound, and each contributes a song or two."

Vincent Thomas of Allmusic wrote "...Flow exhibits that no one better balances traditionalism, provincialism and contemporary aesthetics like Blanchard. This is almost immediately evident and highlighted on "Wadagbe," the album's third cut. Blachard's instantly recognizable, clarion-call horn-tone is still there, as is the native New Orleanian's homage to the Nola stomp and mardi gras Indian chants, plus a classically lyrical jazz-head and an end-song coda that singes. Guitarist Lionel Loueke, still in his early 30s at the time, wrote "Wadagbe" and Benny Golson tribute "Benny's Tune." Young drummer Kendrick Scott wrote album-standout "The Source." In fact, Blanchard handles sole writing duties of just one song on the album, "Wandering Wonder," allowing his younger sidemen's voices to shine. It is this young energy that keeps Blanchard and the album's producer, Herbie Hancock, sounding so vibrant and current. Hancock, years into receiving Social Security, turned in the piano solo of the year on "The Source"—a percussive display so cerebral, violent and dramatic that it almost defies belief. Few of Blanchard's Young Lion peers from the 1980s are still relevant in any fresh way, which makes Flow, together with its predecessor Bounce, such a revelation. Blanchard isn't stuck making 60s tribute albums or recycling the sound of his youth. Instead, he's hooking up with the hip kids, sometimes directing traffic, sometimes going with the Flow."

== Track listing ==
Track	Song Title	Composer	Time
1.	"Flow, Pt. 1"	Blanchard/Hodge	5:29
2.	"Wadagbe (Intro)"	Loueke	4:14
3.	"Wadagbe"	Loueke	10:26
4.	"Benny's Tune"	Loueke	7:43
5.	"Wandering Wonder"	Blanchard	5:46
6.	"Flow, Pt. 2"	Blanchard/Hodge	3:37
7.	"The Source"	Scott	8:01
8.	"Over There"	Hodge	7:32
9.	"Child's Play"	Winston	6:11
10.	"Flow, Pt. 3"	Blanchard/Hodge	2:45
11.	"Harvesting Dance"	Parks	11:42

== Personnel ==
For four days in mid-December 2004, the trumpeter worked with his sextet at the Jim Henson Studios in Hollywood, California. Tracking the sessions at Henson was engineer Don Murray, who has a relationship with Blanchard dating back to 1995, when the trumpeter scored Kasi Lemmons' film Eve's Bayou.

- Terence Blanchard – trumpet
- Aaron Parks – keyboards
- Brice Winston – tenor and soprano saxophones
- Derrick Hodge – bass
- Lionel Loueke – guitar, vocals
- Kendrick Scott – drums
- Herbie Hancock – piano on "Benny's Tune", "The Source"
- Gretchen Parlato – vocals on "Over There", "Child's Play"

== Chart performance ==
Chart (2005)	Peak position
US Traditional Jazz Albums (Billboard)	10
Billboard 200	24
