= Ferenc Nemeth (musician) =

Hungarian-American jazz drummer and composer

Ferenc Nemeth (born May 20, 1976 in Keszthely) is a New York based, Hungarian jazz drummer and composer.

== Biography ==
Nemeth was born in Keszthely, Hungary. At 14 he left home to study classical percussion at the Richter János Conservatory in Győr. He also attended the Franz Liszt Academy of Music and received a scholarship to the Berklee College of Music in Boston. He later studied at the New England Conservatory in their graduate program. In 2001 he was accepted into the Thelonious Monk Institute of Jazz (the first Hungarian in the program) and studied there until 2003. Since 2003 he has been reading in New York City.

He has played with musicians such as Herbie Hancock, Wayne Shorter, Christian McBride, John Patitucci, Terence Blanchard, John Abercrombie, Joshua Redman, Dave Samuels, Mark Turner, Ron McClure, Chris Cheek, Aaron Goldberg, Eli Degibri, Illayaraja. He is also the founding member of Gilfema with Lionel Loueke and Massimo Biolcati. Nemeth's Night Songs was nominated for the 7th Annual Independent Music Awards for Jazz Album of the Year. Since then he has released Triumph (2012), Bridges of Souls (2014) and most recently Freedom (2020) as a leader on his record label, Dreamer's Collective Records as well as Wheel of Time (2006) and Imaginary Realm (2013) with Javier Vercher.

== Discography ==
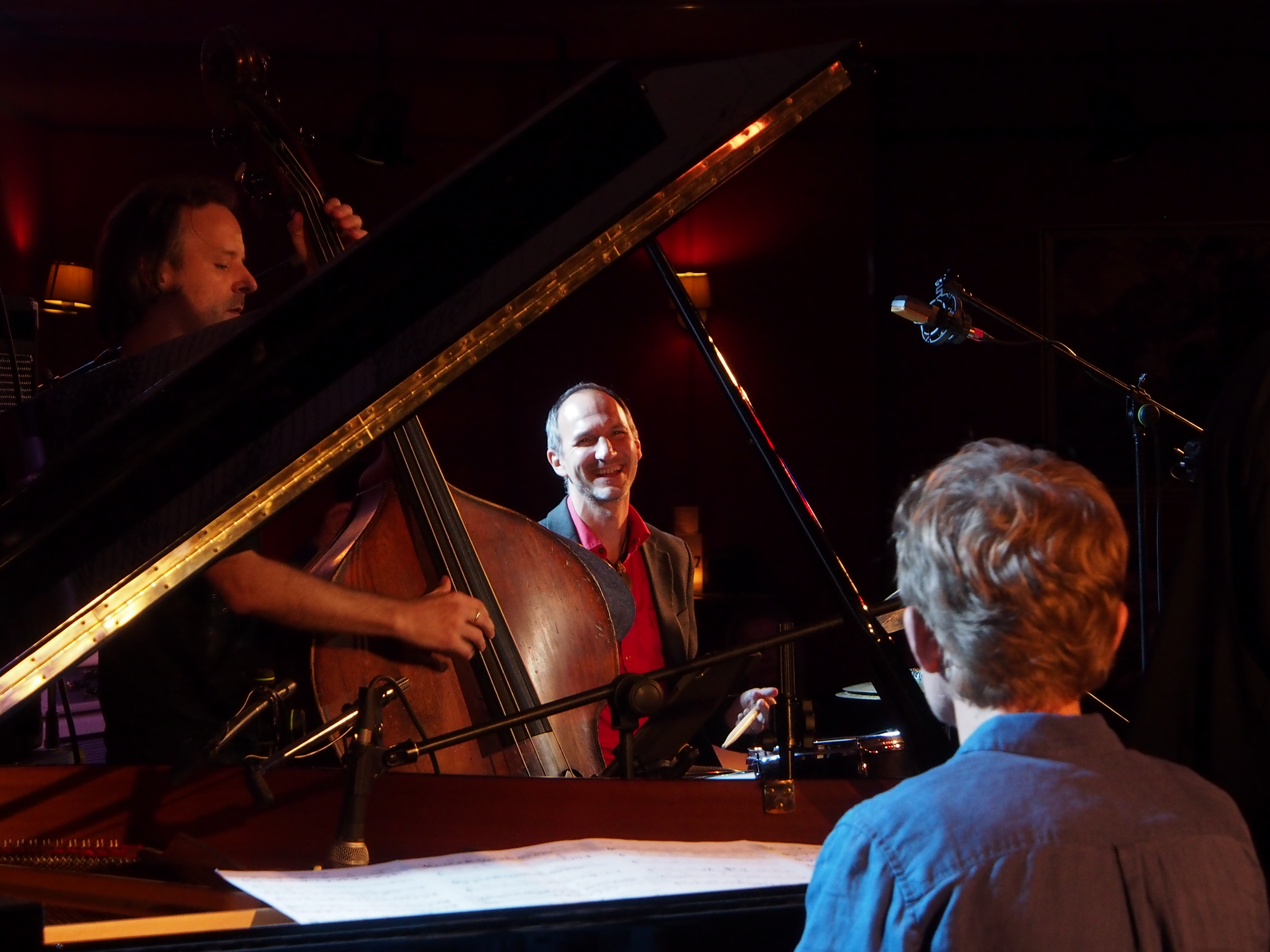
Nemeth at Jazz nad Odrą in 2025

=== As leader ===
- Gilfema (Obliqsound, 2005)
- Night Songs (Dreamers Collective, 2007)
- Gilfema + 2 (Obliqsound, 2008)
- Triumph (Dreamers Collective, 2012)
- Bridges of Souls (Dreamers Collective, 2014)
- Freedom (Dreamers Collective, 2020)
- Three (Sounderscore, 2020)

=== As sideman ===
- Federico Casagrande, Spirit of the Mountains (Dodicilune, 2009)
- Lionel Loueke, Virgin Forest (Obliqsound, 2006)
- Lionel Loueke, Karibu (Blue Note, 2008)
- Lionel Loueke, Mwaliko (Blue Note, 2010)
- Lionel Loueke, Gaïa (Blue Note, 2015)
- Lionel Loueke, The Journey (Aparte, 2018)
- Grand Pianoramax, Grand Pianoramax (Obliqsound, 2005)
- Kenny Werner, Coalition (Half Note, 2014)
- Chihiro Yamanaka, After Hours 2 (Verve, 2012)
