= HH Reimagined =

Studio album by Lionel Loueke and Gilles Peterson
- Released: 20 January 2023
- Recorded: 2022
- Genre: Jazz
- Length: 26:00
- Label: Edition EDN1175
- Producers: Gilles Peterson, Alex Patchwork

Lionel Loueke chronology
HH (2020)	HH Reimagined (2023)	Lean In (2023)

HH Reimagined is a studio collaborative album by Beninese guitarist Lionel Loueke and French DJ Gilles Peterson. Edition released the album on 20 January 2023.

== Background ==
The record contains six remixed tracks originally written by Herbie Hancock and released as the 2020 Loueke's album HH. The official Edition review says: "Gilles Peterson and Lionel Loueke have long term respect for each other’s music and when an opportunity to collaborate together came about, both jumped at the chance. The result is a brilliantly chaotic clash of worldwide club rhythms and guitar loops. The connection is the master Herbie Hancock—a massive influence on the London based DJ and the Beninese guitarist."

== Reception ==
John Adcock of Jazz Journal wrote: "Club rhythms, loops, crashes, yells, guitars (often sampled and distorted) and hypnotic drumming combine across this short collection of tracks. The original material is often hard to pick out under this barrage of sound. Lack of variation in how the material has been reimagined also makes this a challenging listen." Geno Thackara of All About Jazz stated: "Where that unaccompanied recording made a warmly personable and exploratory tribute to Loueke's mentor/colleague/friend, HH Reimagined drags a handful of those tracks through the electronic wringer and straight into some kind of indie rave basement. Savvy mixer Gilles Peterson creates a bed of junkyard beats with chittering crackles and overdriven thuds, often leaving Loueke's own seven-string as lurking (yet important) background coloring. Some of Hancock's oldest-school hard-bop standards become avant-garde rave-ups punctuated by stray vocal samples in timeless underground tradition."

== Track listing ==
All tracks are written by Herbie Hancock.

No.	Title	Length
1.	"One Finger Snap Version"	3:11
2.	"Watermelon Man Version"	3:16
3.	"Driftin Version"	3:11
4.	"Hang Up You Hang Up Version"	3:04
5.	"Tell Me a Bedtime Story Version"	8:13
6.	"Butterfly Version"	5:21
Total length:		26:00

== Personnel ==
- Lionel Loueke – guitar & vocals
- Gilles Peterson – electronics, programming
