= Lean In (album) =

Studio album by Lionel Loueke and Gretchen Parlato
- Released: 19 May 2023
- Recorded: 2–4 March 2022
- Studios: Lucy's Meat Market, Los Angeles
- Genre: Jazz
- Length: 45:02
- Label: Edition EDN1216
- Producers: Lionel Loueke, Gretchen Parlato

Lionel Loueke chronology
HH Reimagined (2023)	Lean In (2023)	United (2024)

Professional ratings
Review scores
Source	Rating
All About Jazz	4/5 stars
The Guardian	4/5 stars
Jazzwise	4/5 stars
Tom Hull	B+

Lean In is a studio collaborative album by Beninese guitarist Lionel Loueke and American jazz singer Gretchen Parlato. The album was released on 19 May 2023 by Edition.

== Background ==
The album was conceived during the height of the pandemic as the two musicians exchanged musical ideas online from their respective homes in Luxembourg and Los Angeles. Just four months into this remote collaboration, Parlato and Loueke convened in a Los Angeles studio, completing the ensemble with bassist Burniss Travis and drummer Mark Guiliana. The songs are performed in English, Portuguese, and Fon—the indigenous language of Benin. The 12 tracks weave together influences from pop and R&B classics, Afrobeat, and Brazilian music. The album includes original compositions, spontaneous improvisational interludes, and fresh reinterpretations of songs by artists such as the Foo Fighters.

Lean In was nominated for Best jazz vocal album at the 66th Grammy® Awards.

== Reception ==
Peter Quinn of Jazzwise wrote: "This new duo album from Gretchen Parlato and Lionel Loueke celebrates 20-plus years of musical connection and camaraderie... Parlato and Loueke's shared vision creates music that makes you move, touches the heart, and stirs the soul." Neil Spencer of The Guardian stated: "Vocal duties are swapped and shared... Loueke provides vocal yips and clicks, Parlato sings with unshowy elan, always sensuous and involving, while the duo’s joint vocals on opener Akwe are positively joyous. A treat." Peter Gamble of Jazz Journal added: "There is an undoubted charm about the duo of singer Gretchen Parlato and guitarist Lionel Loueke, whose friendship and association goes back 20 years. There is a West African slant to many of the tunes, the majority of them being Parlato or Loueke originals."

== Track listing ==
All tracks are written by Lionel Loueke and Gretchen Parlato except where noted.

No.	Title	Writer(s)	Length
1.	"Akwê"	Loueke	4:59
2.	"I Miss You"	Lynn Malsby	5:03
3.	"If I Knew"		4:27
4.	"Okagbé Interlude"	Loueke	1:20
5.	"Astronauta"	Carlos Pingarilho, Marcos Vasconcellos	4:54
6.	"Mi War Sé Interlude"		0:58
7.	"Muse"		4:47
8.	"Nonvignon"		3:54
9.	"Lean In"		4:49
10.	"Painful Joy"		4:16
11.	"Dù Wé Interlude"		1:13
12.	"Walking After You"	Dave Grohl	4:30
Total length:			45:02

== Personnel ==
Band

- Gretchen Parlato – voice, percussion
- Lionel Loueke – guitar, voice, percussion

Guest Personnel

- Mark Guiliana – drums, percussion (tracks 2 3 6 7 9 11 12)
- Burniss Travis – electric bass (tracks 3 6 11)
- Marley Guiliana – voice (tracks 3 6 12)
- Lisa Loueke – voice (track 3)
