= HH =

HH may refer to:

== Organizations ==
- HH Electronics, a British amplifier manufacturer
- Hyper Hippo Entertainment, a Canadian video game company
- Happy Hippie Foundation, a non-profit organization founded by Miley Cyrus
- Hartmann House Preparatory School, an independent preparatory school in Harare, Zimbabwe
- Heirs Holdings, a Nigerian conglomerate with diversified interests
- Helly Hansen, a Norwegian brand specializing in clothing and gear for oceans and mountains
- Heywood Hill, a bookshop in London

== Science, technology and mathematics ==
- Hh, a signalling molecule in Drosophila named for the Hedgehog signaling pathway
- hh blood group, a rare blood type
- Henderson–Hasselbalch equation, in biology and chemistry
- Hereditary haemochromatosis
- Herbig–Haro object, in astronomy
- Hitchhiker Program, a NASA program established in 1984
- Hochschild homology
- Hodgkin–Huxley model, an electrical model of neurons
- Microsoft Compiled HTML Help (hh.exe)

== Transportation ==
- HH (Court Street Shuttle), on the New York City Subway 1936–1946
- HH (Rockaway Shuttle), on the New York City Subway 1962–1972
- HH Ferry route between Helsingborg, Sweden, and Helsingør, Denmark
- HH Tunnel, a proposed series of tunnels between Helsingborg and Helsingør

== Entertainment ==
- "Heil Hitler" (song), a 2025 single by Kanye West
- The Moonbase, a 1967 Doctor Who serial (production code "HH")
- Higglytown Heroes, an American animated series
- Horrible Histories, media franchise
- Hazbin Hotel, an animated television series
- HH (Lionel Loueke album)

== People ==
- Hakainde Hichilema, Zambian politician
- Howard Hughes, American tycoon and film producer

== Terms and phrases ==
- hh (digraph), in several languages
- "hands high" when referring to the height of a horse, abbreviated "hh"
- Hand-Held, a term in film production among camera staff
- Heil Hitler, a chant prevalent in Nazi Germany and neo-Nazi groups
- His Highness, or Her Highness, a formal address
- His Holiness, or Her Holiness, a formal address

== Places ==
- Hamburg, Germany (ISO 3166-2 code DE-HH) and HH ("Hansestadt Hamburg"), vehicle licence plate prefix
- Hilton Head Island, South Carolina, an island off the coast of South Carolina, US

== Other uses ==
- HH, a brassiere cup size
- Habbo, online community formerly known as Habbo Hotel
- Happy Hour, a period of time (not necessarily one hour) when bars and restaurants offer discounts on food and/or drinks
- HH, the name for the former mascot of the electronics/appliances store H. H. Gregg
