= Invisible Cinema =

Studio album by Aaron Parks
- Released: August 19, 2008
- Recorded: January 20–22, 2008
- Studio: Brooklyn Recording
- Label: Blue Note Records
- Producer: Aaron Parks & Michele Locatelli

Aaron Parks chronology
Shadows (2002)	Invisible Cinema (2008)	Alive in Japan (2013)

Professional ratings
Review scores
Source	Rating
Allmusic	4/5 stars
The Times	4/5 stars

Invisible Cinema is an album by jazz pianist and composer Aaron Parks, that was released on the Blue Note label on August 19, 2008. The album is Parks' debut for Blue Note.

== Track listing ==
1. "Travelers"
2. "Peaceful Warrior"
3. "Nemesis"
4. "Riddle Me This"
5. "Into the Labyrinth"
6. "Karma"
7. "Roadside Distraction"
8. "Harvesting Dance"
9. "Praise"
10. "Afterglow"

== Personnel ==
- Aaron Parks – piano, mellotron, glockenspiel, synthesizers
- Mike Moreno - guitar
- Matt Penman – bass
- Eric Harland – drums
