= Herbie Hancock Institute of Jazz =

Non-profit music education organization

- Founded: 1986; 40 years ago
- Headquarters: Washington, DC
- Key people: Herbie Hancock, Thomas R. Carter
- Website: hancockinstitute.org
- Formerly called: Thelonious Monk Institute of Jazz

The Herbie Hancock Institute of Jazz is a non-profit music education organization founded in 1986. Before 2019, it was known as the Thelonious Monk Institute of Jazz, but was then renamed after its longtime board chairman, Herbie Hancock.

The institute has held its International Jazz Competition annually since 1987 and offered a full scholarship graduate-level college program since 1995. It organizes free jazz education programs in public schools throughout the United States and the world “to encourage imaginative thinking, creativity, a positive self-image and respect for one’s own and others’ cultural heritage.” It is also the lead non-profit responsible for coordinating the annual celebration of International Jazz Day, a United Nations initiative.

== College program ==
One of the institute's earliest goals was to create a unique college-level jazz program where the masters of jazz could pass on their expertise to the next generation of jazz musicians. In September 1995, the Thelonious Monk Institute of Jazz Performance was launched and the first class of seven students began their intensive training with some of the world's greatest musicians. The performance institute was located at Loyola University New Orleans before relocating in 2011.

Now known as the Herbie Hancock Institute of Jazz Performance, the two-year, tuition-free program accepts one ensemble of musicians for each class. All of the students receive full scholarships, as well as stipends to cover their monthly living expenses. The students study both individually and as a small group, receiving personal mentoring, ensemble coaching, and lectures on the jazz tradition. They are also encouraged to experiment in expanding jazz in new directions through their compositions and performances. Alumni include Ambrose Akinmusire, Lionel Loueke, Michael Mayo, Helen Sung, Carmen Staaf, Walter Smith III, Wayne Escoffery, Eli Degibri, Dayna Stephens and Gretchen Parlato. The institute is currently located at the Herb Alpert School of Music at the University of California, Los Angeles. In October 2021, the 13th class was announced, including eight young musicians from the United States and Russia.

In addition to their rigorous course of studies, students in the program perform regularly at venues throughout Los Angeles and serve as mentors and educators both in the local community and on Institute jazz education tours across the United States and internationally. Recent classes have visited Sitka, AK; Phoenix, AZ; Morocco, Havana, Cuba; Saint Petersburg, Russia; Panama City, Panama; and Melbourne, Sydney and Mt. Gambier, Australia.

== Herbie Hancock Institute of Jazz International Competition ==
Since 1987, the institute has presented an annual international competition. More than $100,000 in scholarships and prizes is awarded to musicians and composers each year. The competition focuses on a different instrument every year and features a panel of judges. Branford Marsalis, Pat Metheny, Herbie Hancock, Christian McBride, Dee Dee Bridgewater, Dianne Reeves, Hugh Masekela, Arturo Sandoval, Ron Carter, Wayne Shorter, Clark Terry, Marian McPartland, Quincy Jones, and Diana Krall have all served as judges at past competitions.

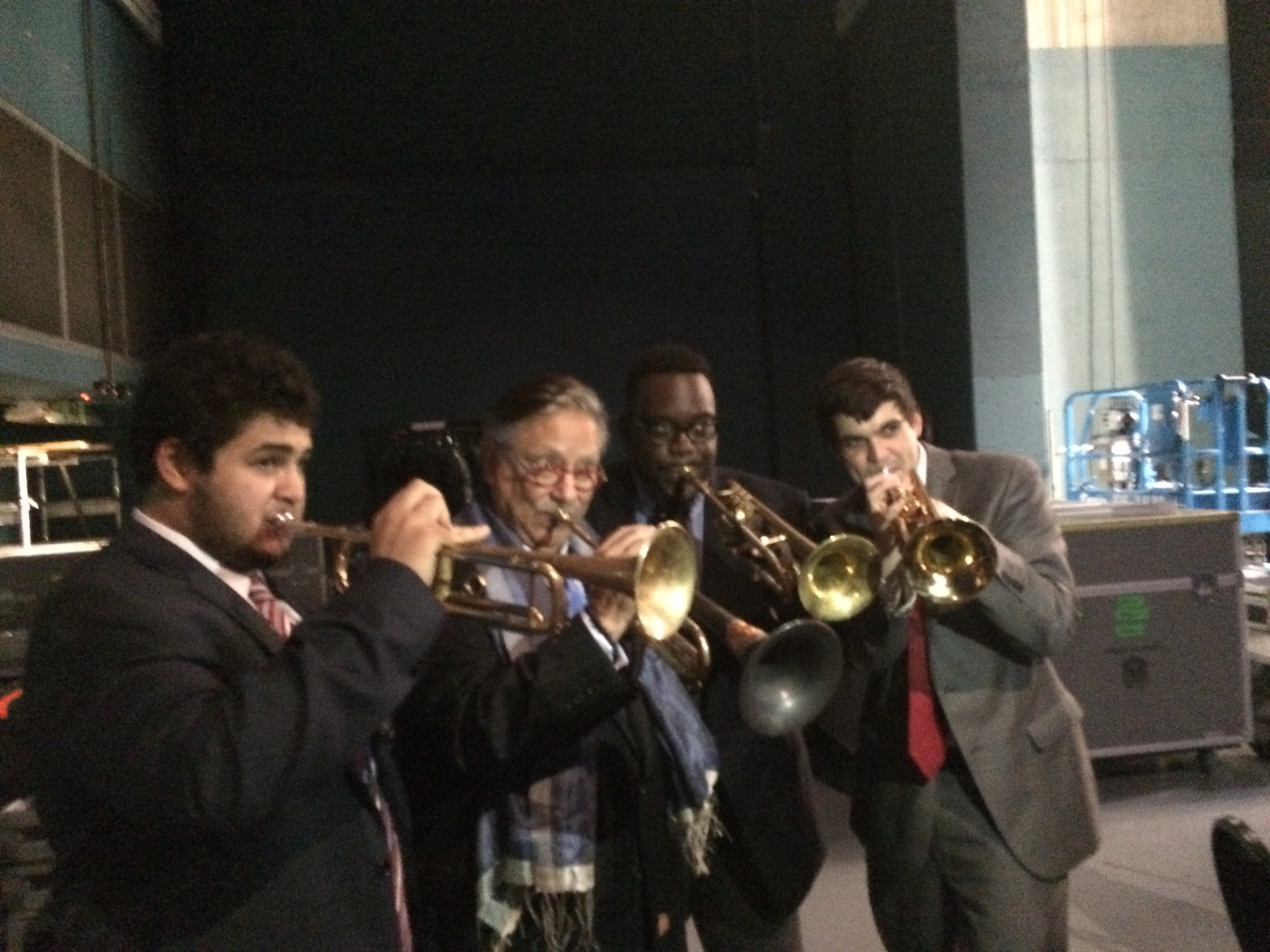
Finalists in the institute's 2014 Trumpet Competition (from left) Adam O'Farrill (3rd), Marquis Hill (1st) and Billy Buss (2nd) pose with judge Arturo Sandoval backstage after the competition finals at the Dolby Theatre in Los Angeles.

The competition has been won by Joshua Redman, winner of the 1991 saxophone competition, Marcus Roberts, winner of the 1987 piano competition, Ryan Kisor, winner of the 1990 trumpet competition, and Joey DeFrancesco, a finalist in the 1987 piano competition. The 1993 piano competition winner, Jacky Terrasson, signed with Blue Note Records. The 1998 vocals competition produced: the late Teri Thornton, winner of the competition who signed with Verve Records; second-place winner Jane Monheit who signed with Columbia; semifinalist Tierney Sutton who signed with Telarc; and third-place winner Roberta Gambarini, whose American debut album, Easy to Love, was nominated for a 2007 Grammy for Best Jazz Vocal Performance, Female. Aaron Parks placed third in the piano competition of 2006 and was subsequently signed by Blue Note Records. Recent winners include GRAMMY Award-winning vocalist Cécile McLorin Salvant (2010), Emmy Award-winning pianist and composer Kris Bowers (2011), saxophonist Melissa Aldana (2013), vocalist Jazzmeia Horn (2015) and guitarist Evgeny Pobozhiy (2019). Dozens of other finalists and semifinalists have forged successful careers as jazz performers and educators.

=== Past winners ===
- 1987: Marcus Roberts, Piano
- 1988: Ted Rosenthal, Piano
- 1989: Bill Cunliffe, Piano
- 1990: Ryan Kisor, Trumpet
- 1991: Joshua Redman, Saxophone
- 1992: Harold Summey, Drums
- 1993: Jacky Terrasson, Piano
- 1994: Sara Lazarus, Vocals
- 1995: Jesse van Ruller, Guitar; Darryl Hall, Bass
- 1996: Jon Gordon, Saxophone
- 1997: Darren Barrett, Trumpet
- 1998: Teri Thornton, Vocals
- 1999: Eric Lewis, Piano
- 2000: Pedrito Martinez, Afro-Latin Hand Drums
- 2001: competition not held
- 2002: Seamus Blake, Saxophone
- 2003: Andre Hayward, Trombone
- 2004: Gretchen Parlato, Vocals
- 2005: Lage Lund, Guitar
- 2006: Tigran Hamasyan, Piano
- 2007: Ambrose Akinmusire, Trumpet
- 2008: Jon Irabagon, Saxophone
- 2009: Ben Williams, Bass
- 2010: Cécile McLorin Salvant, Vocals
- 2011: Kris Bowers, Piano
- 2012: Jamison Ross, Drums
- 2013: Melissa Aldana, Saxophone
- 2014: Marquis Hill, Trumpet
- 2015: Jazzmeia Horn, Vocals
- 2016: competition not held
- 2017: competition not held
- 2018: Tom Oren, Piano
- 2019: Evgeny Pobozhiy, Guitar
- 2020: competition not held
- 2021: competition not held
- 2022: competition not held
- 2023: Jahari Stampley, Piano

Notable runners-up

- 1987: Joey DeFrancesco, Piano
- 1991: Chris Potter, Saxophone
- 1992: Jorge Rossy, Drums
- 1993: Peter Martin, Piano
- 1993: Edward Simon, Piano
- 1997: Avishai Cohen, Trumpet
- 1998: Tierney Sutton, Vocals
- 1998: Roberta Gambarini, Vocals
- 1998: Jane Monheit, Vocals
- 1999: Orrin Evans, Piano
- 1999: Sam Yahel, Piano
- 2002: John Ellis, Saxophone
- 2002: Marcus Strickland, Saxophone
- 2002: Jaleel Shaw, Saxophone
- 2003: Marshall Gilkes, Trombone
- 2006: Gerald Clayton, Piano
- 2006: Aaron Parks, Piano
- 2010: Cyrille Aimée, Vocals
- 2011: Emmet Cohen, Piano
- 2013: Tivon Pennicott, Saxophone
- 2015: Veronica Swift, Vocals

== International Jazz Day ==
In November 2011, the United Nations Educational, Scientific and Cultural Organization (UNESCO) officially designated April 30 as International Jazz Day to celebrate jazz as a universal language and tool for diplomacy. International Jazz Day is chaired and led by UNESCO Director General Audrey Azoulay and jazz pianist/composer Herbie Hancock, who serves as a UNESCO Ambassador for Intercultural Dialogue. The institute is the lead nonprofit organization charged with planning, promoting and producing this annual celebration, which began in 2012.

International Jazz Day was established to bring together communities, schools, artists, historians, academics, and jazz enthusiasts all over the world to learn about jazz and its roots. This day seeks to raise awareness of the need for intercultural dialogue and mutual understanding; and also to reinforce international cooperation and communication. Each year on April 30, International Jazz Day celebrates jazz as a symbol for promoting peace, fostering dialogue among cultures, allowing freedom of expression, and reinforcing the role of youth for social change.

International Jazz Day is celebrated in more than 190 countries on all seven continents.

== Other educational programs ==
=== Jazz in the Classroom ===
Since 1989, the institute has gone into public schools to provide music instruction and instrument training sessions for public school students in Los Angeles, New Orleans, and Washington, D.C., as well as thousands of students in urban, rural, and remote areas of the country. In recent years, the institute has reported a 100% high school graduation rate for students in the program, with more than 90% going on to college and more than 75% of graduating seniors securing significant college scholarships.

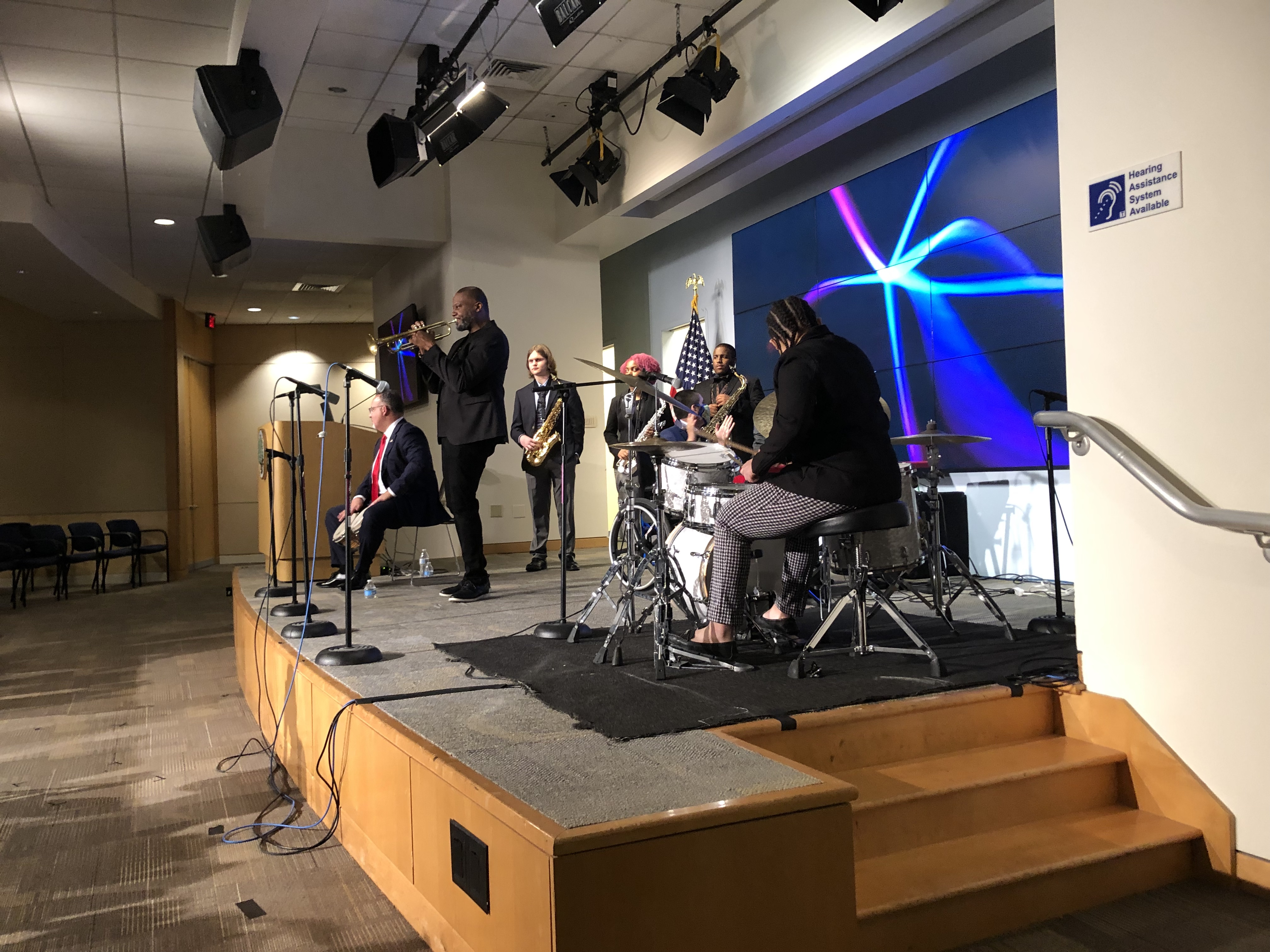
Students in the Institute's Performing Arts High Schools program perform with U.S. Secretary of Education Miguel Cardona during an event at the Department of Education's Washington, D.C. headquarters.

=== Performing Arts High Schools Jazz Program ===
This program brings jazz musicians and educators into public performing arts high schools in order to provide intensive jazz training to students. Through this performance-based program, music students receive instruction in composition, theory, improvisation, history, and musical styles, preparing them to attend leading college, university, and conservatory music programs. The program is offered at the following public performing arts high schools:

- Arts High School (Newark, NJ)
- Baltimore School for the Arts
- Booker T. Washington High School for the Performing and Visual Arts (Dallas, TX)
- Chicago High School for the Arts
- Duke Ellington School of the Arts (Washington, DC)
- Kinder High School for the Performing and Visual Arts (Houston, TX)
- LaGuardia High School of Music & Art and Performing Arts (New York, NY)
- Los Angeles County High School for the Arts
- Music and Performing Arts Academy at Hamilton High School (Los Angeles, CA)
- New Orleans Center for Creative Arts
- New World School of the Arts (Miami, FL)
- Ramon C. Cortines School of Visual and Performing Arts (Los Angeles, CA)
- Ruth Asawa San Francisco School of the Arts

=== BeBop to Hip-Hop ===
Begun in 2004 in the Los Angeles public schools, "Bebop to Hip-Hop" brings together jazz and hip-hop students under the direction of professional jazz musicians and hip-hop artists. Aspiring young musicians study improvisation, lyric writing, music theory, arranging, composition, turntable scratching, and sampling. Recent concerts included performances by Billy Childs, Herbie Hancock, DJ Spark, Doug E. Fresh, Kool Mo Dee, Chali 2na, Supernatural, and Bobby Watson. The free virtual edition of BeBop to Hip-Hop in summer 2020 served over 100 high school musicians from across the U.S. and internationally.

=== Math, Science & Music ===
Math, Science & Music uses music as a tool to teach math and science to K-12 and college students. The institute collaborates with math, science, music and education experts at Harvard, MIT, Johns Hopkins, New York University, the University of California Berkeley and other universities to offer a wealth of free engaging curricula, games, apps and other interactive online resources based on the platform's website, mathsciencemusic.org. Math, Science & Music was launched in 2016, with an event at the U.S. Department of Education hosted by Secretary of Education John King.

=== Jazz in America ===
Launched in 2000, Jazz in America is an internet-based jazz curriculum designed to be taught in 5th, 8th, and 11th grade public school American history and social studies classrooms in the United States. The curriculum examines the evolution of jazz styles, contributions of important performers, and musical techniques involved in the creation and performance of jazz. As of 2021, the institute notes that the program's public school touring component has directly reached more than 500,000 students and teachers through assembly programs and master classes led by renowned jazz artists including Herbie Hancock, Antonio Hart, Ingrid Jensen, Vanessa Rubin and Bobby Watson. In summer 2020, the institute offered a series of free, virtual webinars introducing students in grades 4–12 to the Jazz in America curriculum.

=== International programs ===
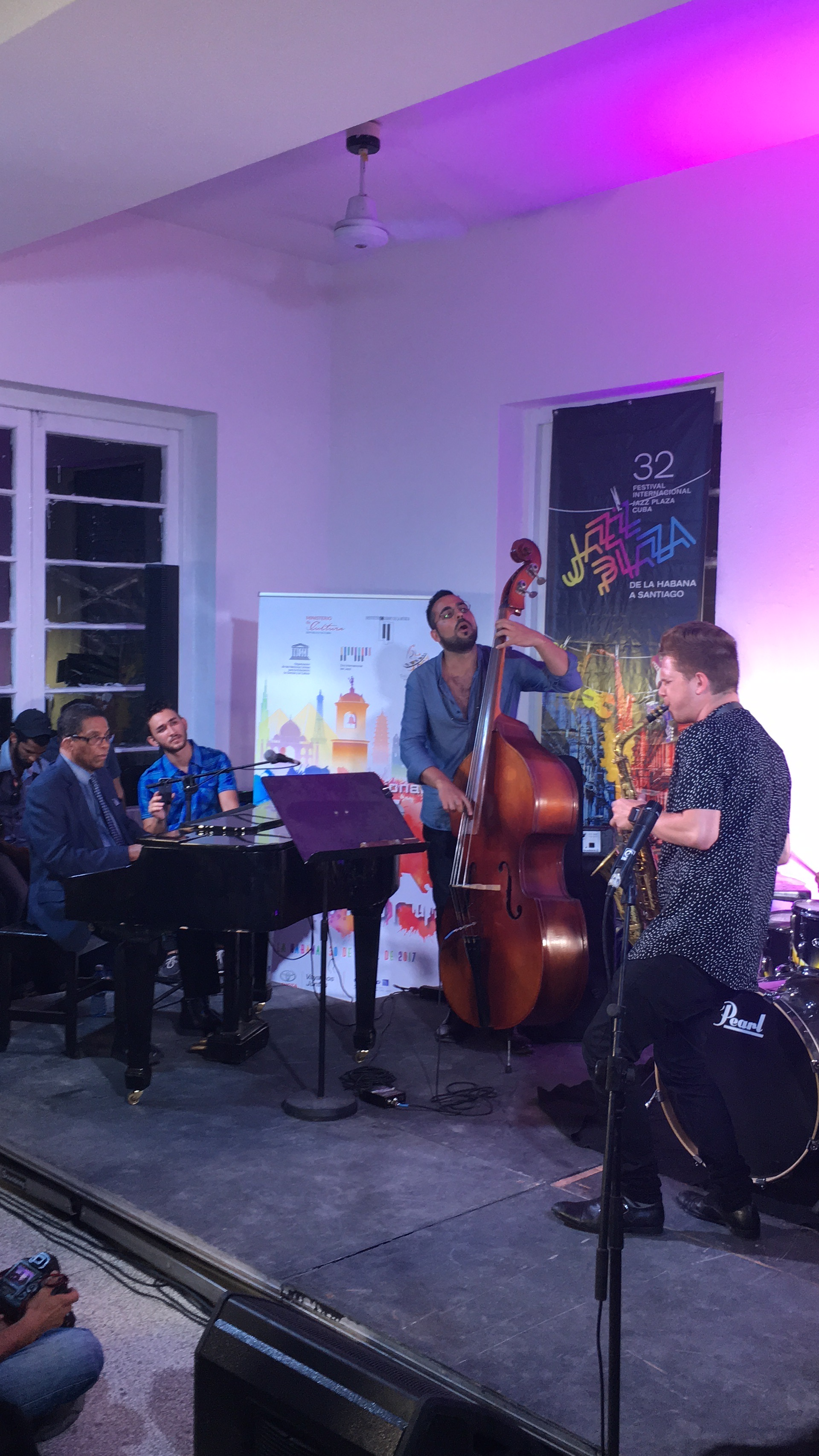
Bassist Luca Alemanno and saxophonist Alex Hahn of the Thelonious Monk Institute of Jazz Performance Class of 2017 perform with Herbie Hancock at International Jazz Day 2017 celebrations in Havana, Cuba.

The institute's students and major jazz artists have traveled around the world as jazz ambassadors, presenting education programs throughout Europe, Asia, Africa, South America, and the Caribbean. Programs have included:

- 1995 tour of seven African nations (Eritrea, Ethiopia, Madagascar, Mauritius, Mozambique, South Africa, and Swaziland)
- 1996 tour of India and Thailand
- 1998 tour of Chile, Argentina and Peru
- 2001 tour of Egypt
- 2005 tour of Vietnam to mark the 10th anniversary of the United States and Vietnam resuming diplomatic relations
- 2009 tour of India commemorating the 50th anniversary of Martin Luther King's visit to study Mahatma Gandhi's nonviolence movement
- 2010 tour of China with Institute students performing at the 2010 Shanghai Expo and also in Beijing's Forbidden City Concert Hall.
- 2011 tour of Italy's Basilicata region.
- 2012 tour of Russia, with concerts in Moscow and St. Petersburg.
- 2013 tour of Stockholm, Sweden with master classes and performances at the Royal College of Music
- 2013 appearance by the institute's students alongside vocalist Jane Monheit at the Red Sea Jazz Festival in Eilat, Israel
- 2014 tour in Mexico, with educational workshops and performances at the Centro Nacional de las Artes and the Escuela Superior de Música
- 2015 tour of Morocco, with performances and workshops in Rabat and Marrakesh
- 2019 visit to the Generations in Jazz Festival in Mount Gambier, Australia, where the institute's students performed and taught along with artists including Joey DeFrancesco, Kurt Elling, Lizz Wright and others
- 2022 tour of Jordan, including engagement with local youth and performances at prominent archaeological sites
- 2024 tour of India featuring performances and master classes with students in New Delhi and Mumbai, dedicated to celebrating the life and legacy of Dr. Martin Luther King Jr. The tour commemorated the 65th anniversary of Martin Luther King's visit to study Mahatma Gandhi's nonviolence movement.
- 2025 visit to Riyadh, Saudi Arabia

For three years beginning in 2002, UNESCO sponsored a tour of Paris, where the institute's college students performed with Herbie Hancock, Wayne Shorter, Dianne Reeves, Dee Dee Bridgewater, and T.S. Monk at International Philosophy Day.

Institute of Jazz Performance students have also regularly appeared at the Panama Jazz Festival since 2008.

== Television specials ==
The institute has produced a series of television specials to highlight the importance of jazz. In 1986, the institute produced "Celebrating a Jazz Master: Thelonious Sphere Monk," a PBS tribute concert hosted by Bill Cosby. In 1993, the institute coordinated "A White House Jazz Festival", the first "In Performance at The White House" PBS special taped with President and Mrs. Clinton. In 1996, the institute produced "A Celebration of America's Music", the first network television special devoted to jazz in more than 25 years, which aired on ABC. A second "A Celebration of America's Music" aired in 1998. In 2006, President and Mrs. Bush hosted a concert celebrating the institute's 20th anniversary that aired as an "In Performance at The White House" PBS special hosted by Barbara Walters. In addition, the institute's international jazz competitions have been featured as documentaries on Black Entertainment Television and its affiliates.

More recently, in 2016 the institute produced a network television special in honor of the fifth anniversary of International Jazz Day on ABC, “Jazz at the White House,” filmed at the White House and hosted by President Barack Obama and First Lady Michelle Obama. The special was subsequently nominated for an Emmy for Outstanding Music Direction by John Beasley. Since 2012, the institute has produced television specials for PBS focusing on the annual celebration of International Jazz Day, with “International Jazz Day 2022” airing nationally in April 2022.

Art for the 2013 Saxophone Competition

== Artwork and donations by Billy Dee Williams ==
Billy Dee Williams has donated artwork that has been used as the cover of the institute's International Jazz Competition since 1990. The artwork corresponds with the instrument being featured in that year's competition.
