= H12 =

H12 may refer to:

== Vehicles ==
- Bell H-12, an American utility helicopter
- Curtiss H-12, an American flying boat
- Hiller H-12, an American helicopter
- HMS Achates (H12), a Royal Navy A-class destroyer
- HMS H12, a Royal Navy H-class submarine
- LSWR H12 class, a British steam railcar

== Other uses ==
- H-12, Islamabad, site of a campus of the National University of Sciences & Technology
- Highway H12 (Ukraine)
- London Buses route H12, a Transport for London contracted bus route
