= H11 =

H11, H-11 or H 11 may refer to:

- H-11 (Michigan county highway)
- British NVC community H11, a type of heath community in the British National Vegetation Classification
- Heathkit H-11, a microcomputer
- HMS Basilisk (H11), a Royal Navy B-class destroyer
- HMS Racehorse (H11), a Royal Navy R-class destroyer
- HMS H11, a Royal Navy H-class submarine
- London Buses route H11, a Transport for London contracted bus route
- Sanguiin H 11, a type of tannin
- A motor vehicle headlamp bulb type; see List of automotive light bulb types
