= Gretchen Parlato =

American jazz singer

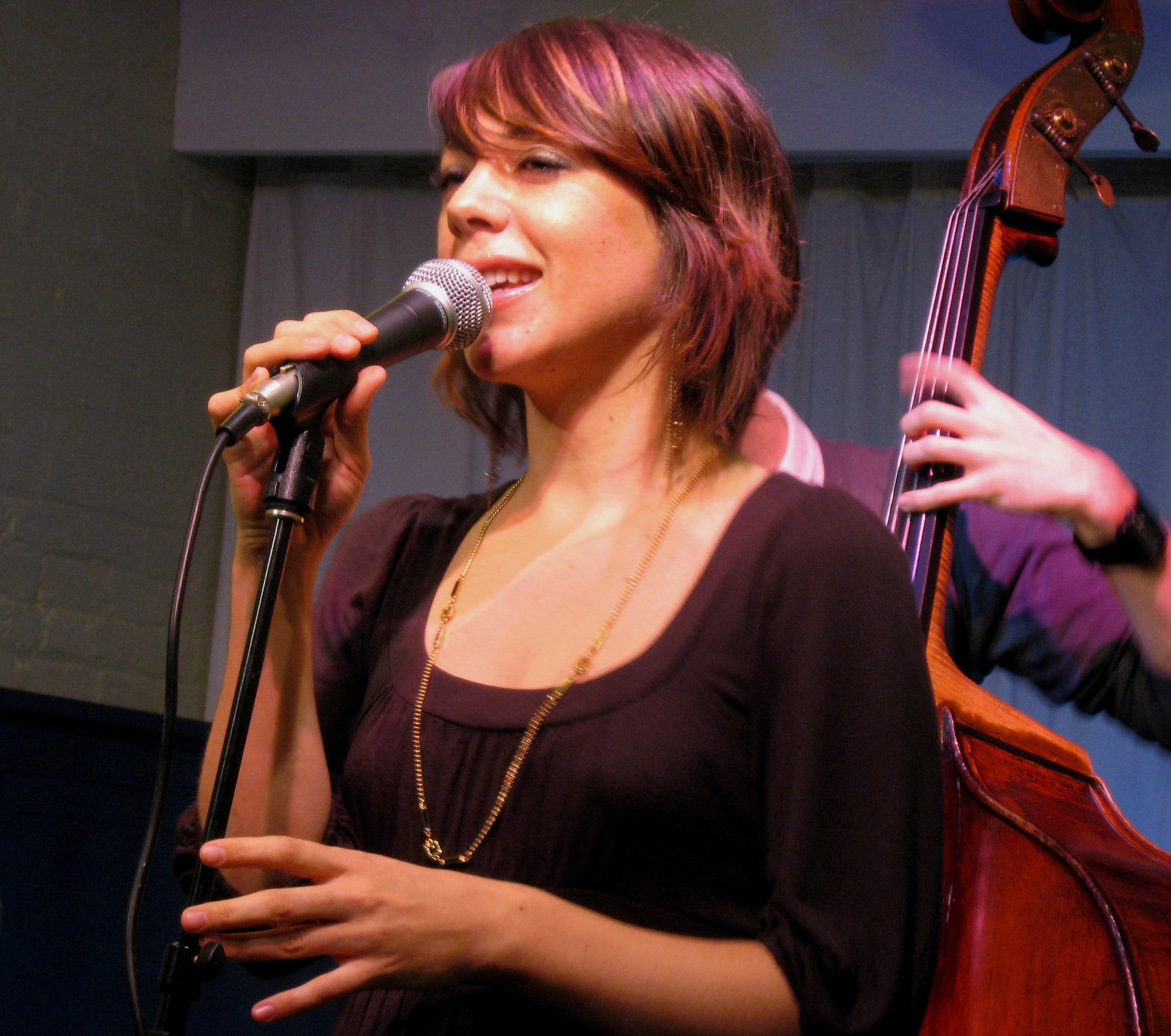

Background information
- Born: February 11, 1976 (age 50); Los Angeles, California, U.S.
- Origin: New York City, NY, U.S.
- Genre: Jazz
- Occupations: Musician, songwriter
- Instrument: Vocals
- Years active: 2003–present
- Labels: ObliqSound, Edition
- Member of: SFJAZZ Collective
- Website: gretchenparlato.com

Gretchen Parlato (born February 11, 1976) is an American jazz singer. She has performed and recorded with musicians such as Wayne Shorter, Herbie Hancock, Kenny Barron, Esperanza Spalding, Terence Blanchard, Marcus Miller and Lionel Loueke.

Parlato's Lean In (2023), a duo album with guitarist Lionel Loueke, received a Grammy Award Nomination for Best Jazz Vocal Album, hitting No. 1 upon release in iTunes Jazz and Best of 2023 in Jazz News Paris, JazzFM and The Boston Globe. Her album Flor (2021) received a Grammy Award Nomination for Best Jazz Vocal Album, hitting No. 1 upon release in iTunes Jazz and No. 3 Best of the Year Albums in Jazzwise Critics Poll '21. Live in NYC (2013) received a Grammy Award Nomination for Best Jazz Vocal Album, also receiving 4.5 stars in Downbeat Magazine, with the DVD hitting No. 1 on the iTunes best music video list. The Lost and Found (2011) received over 30 national and international awards, including Jazztimes Expanded Critics Poll No. 1 Vocal Album of 2011 and iTunes Vocal Jazz Album of the Year. Her 2009 sophomore release, In a Dream, was Jazz Critics Poll No. 1 Vocal Album of 2009 and hailed by Billboard as "the most alluring jazz vocal album of 2009."

== Early years ==
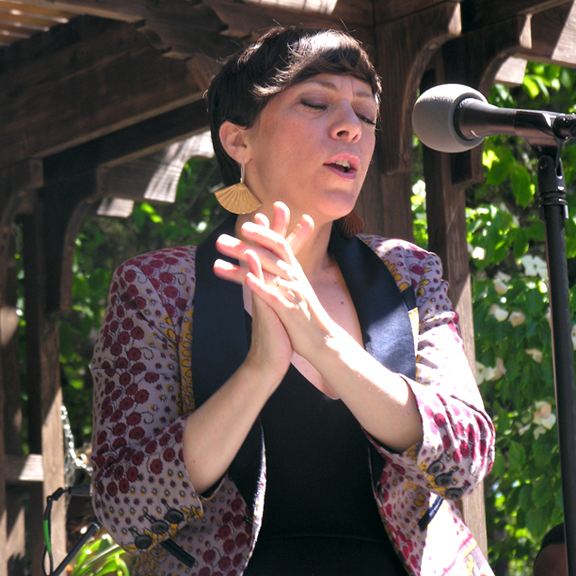
Jazz at Filoli, Woodside, California, March 2015

Parlato was born in 1976 in Los Angeles, California, the daughter of Dave Parlato, a bass player for Frank Zappa, Al Jarreau, Don Preston, Barbra Streisand, Henry Mancini, Paul Horn, Gabor Szabo, Buddy Rich, Don Ellis, and recorded for TV and film. Her grandfather was Charlie Parlato, a trumpeter in the Kay Kyser Big Band, and singer and trumpeter for Tennessee Ernie Ford and Lawrence Welk. Growing up in the 1980s, Parlato says she was a Valley girl.

As a child, Parlato says she was influenced by Bossa nova; "I was flipping through my mom's record collection and the cover of Stan Getz and João Gilberto’s 1963 "Getz/Gilberto" album struck me. The cover had an image of an abstract painting. I took out the album and put it on and I heard João Gilberto's voice, and the texture and simplicity of the music struck me — even at 13 years old. That was definitely a turning point."

Parlato attended Los Angeles County High School for the Arts, then earned a bachelor's degree in Ethnomusicology/Jazz Studies at University of California, Los Angeles.

In 2001 she was accepted into the Thelonious Monk Institute of Jazz Performance by a panel of judges including Herbie Hancock, Terence Blanchard, and Wayne Shorter. Parlato was the first vocalist ever admitted into the program.

In 2003, Parlato moved to New York City. A year later, she won first place in the Thelonious Monk International Jazz Vocals Competition at the Kennedy Center in Washington D.C. by a panel of judges: Quincy Jones, Flora Purim, Al Jarreau, Kurt Elling, Dee Dee Bridgewater and Jimmy Scott.

== Career ==
In 2005 she released her self-titled first album, Gretchen Parlato, which was produced by Tor Hyams. In September 2007 she performed with Wayne Shorter at La Villette Jazz Festival in Paris.

In July 2008 Parlato signed a contract with independent record label ObliqSound and in August 2009 released her second CD, In a Dream with Lionel Loueke, Aaron Parks, Derrick Hodge and Kendrick Scott. It was voted Best Jazz Vocal Album in Jazz Critics Poll (2009) and appeared on the annual top ten lists of JazzTimes, NPR, and the Boston Globe.

In Spring 2009 she was featured in The Documentary Channel's 4-part series Icons Among Us: Jazz in the Present Tense.

In Spring 2010 she was nominated for Female Singer of the Year by the Jazz Journalists Association. During Summer 2010 Parlato sold out performances in NYC, Montreal, Paris, The Hague, Copenhagen, Stuttgart and Molde, Norway, with Taylor Eigsti, Alan Hampton and Mark Guiliana and was voted No. 2 Rising Star Vocalist in Down Beat Critics Poll.

In 2011 she released her 2nd album for ObliqSound, The Lost and Found with Taylor Eigsti, Derrick Hodge, Kendrick Scott, Dayna Stephens, Alan Hampton, and associate producer, Robert Glasper. On this album, she introduced four of her own songs and wrote lyrics to compositions of her fellow musicians and for Wayne Shorter's "Juju." In addition she reinterpreted a samba by Paulinho da Viola and popular R&B songs by Mary J. Blige, Lauryn Hill, and Simply Red. The Lost and Found placed in the top 10 in over 30 polls in the US and Europe. In this same year she was awarded No. 1 Female Vocalist in JazzTimes Expanded Critics Poll, No. 1 Rising Star Female Vocalist in Downbeat Critics Poll, No. 3 Best Female Vocalist in Downbeat Readers Poll and received the ASCAP Eunice & Hal David Award of Merit for Songwriting.

In 2013 she released a live CD/DVD album Live in NYC, featuring two ensembles: Taylor Eigsti (piano), Derrick Hodge / Alan Hampton (bass), Kendrick Scott / Mark Guiliana (drums). The album received a Grammy Award Nomination for Best Jazz Vocal Album, receiving 4.5 stars in Downbeat Magazine, the DVD hitting No. 1 iTunes Jazz Best Music Video upon release. Parlato was awarded No. 2 Best Female Vocalist in Downbeat Critics Poll.

In late 2013 Parlato took a break from her heavy touring schedule for the birth of her son, becoming a faculty member at the Manhattan School of Music.

In summer 2020, Parlato signed a contract with Edition Records and in March 2021 a new album, Flor, was released, with Marcel Camargo (guitar, musical direction), Artyom Manukyan (cello), Leo Costa (drums, percussion) and featuring Airto Moreira, Gerald Clayton and Mark Guiliana. Flor received a Grammy Nomination for Best Jazz Vocal Album, placed No. 3 Best Album of 2021 in Jazzwise Critics Poll, and in the top albums of 2021 in Jazziz Magazine, JazzFM, the Guardian and the Arts Desk.

In 2021 Parlato became a member of SFJazz Collective with Chris Potter (musical director, saxophones), Edward Simon (piano), Etienne Charles (trumpet), David Sánchez (tenor saxophone), Warren Wolf (vibraphone), Matt Brewer (bass), Kendrick Scott (drums) and Martin Luther McCoy (vocals). In spring 2022 the Collective released the album New Works Reflecting the Moment. Recorded live, it documents new works from the all-star ensemble which address racial injustices, the unprecedented political polarization and the global pandemic.

Parlato has been a guest vocalist on over 90 recordings, including four Esperanza Spalding albums Songwright's Apothecary Lab (Grammy Award for Best Jazz Vocal Album), Radio Music Society (Grammy Award for Best Jazz Vocal Album), Chamber Music Society and Esperanza, Kenny Barron's The Traveler, Marcus Miller's Renaissance, Lionel Loueke's albums Heritage and Virgin Forest, Terence Blanchard's Flow, and Terri Lyne Carrington's The Mosaic Project (Grammy Award for Best Jazz Vocal Album), Taylor Eigsti A Tree Falls (Grammy Award for Best Contemporary Instrumental Album) singing lyrics as well as wordless vocals. Parlato currently tours the US and EU with SFJazz Collective and resumes tours with her quartet Summer/Fall 2022.

== Discography ==
=== As leader ===
- Gretchen Parlato (self-released, 2005)
- In a Dream (ObliqSound, 2009) – recorded in 2008
- The Lost and Found (ObliqSound, 2011)
- Live in NYC (ObliqSound, 2013)[CD, DVD-Video] – live
- Lean In with Lionel Loueke (Edition, 2023)
- The Wise Ones (Edition, 2026)

=== Collaborations ===
The Jazz Gallery and Habitat for Humanity

- V.A., Home: Gift of Music - Japan Earthquake / Tsunami Relief (Sunnyside, 2012) – compilation, 4 tracks

Tillery
With Rebecca Martin and Becca Stevens

- Tillery (Core Port, 2016)

SFJAZZ Collective

- New Works Reflecting The Moment (SFJAZZ, 2022) – live recorded in 2021

=== As guest ===
With Mark Guiliana

- Beat Music (Rockwood Musichall Recordings, 2012)
- My Life Starts Now (Beat Music, 2014)
- Beat Music 2.0 (Edition Records, 2026)

With Lionel Loueke

- Virgin Forest (ObliqSound, 2006)
- Heritage (Blue Note, 2012)

With Esperanza Spalding

- Esperanza (Heads Up/Concord, 2008) – recorded in 2007
- Chamber Music Society (Heads Up, 2010) – recorded in 2009
- Radio Music Society (Heads Up, 2012)
- Songwrights Apothecary Lab (Concord, 2021)

With Taylor Eigsti

- Tree Falls (GSI, 2021)
- Plot Armor (GroundUP Records, 2024)

With Becca Stevens

- Weightless (Sunnyside, 2011)
- V.A., My Life Is Bold (Sunnyside, 2012)

With New West Guitar Group

- Sleeping Lady (self-released, 2009)
- Send One Your Love (Summit, 2015)

With The Sugarplastic

- Bang, The Earth Is Round (Geffen, 1996)
- Resin (Escape Artist, 2000)

With others

- Moonchild, Waves (Tru Thoughts Recordings, 2026)
- Camila Meza, Portal (GroundUP Records, 2025)
- Kenny Barron, The Traveler (Sunnyside, 2008) – recorded in 2007
- David Binney, Graylen Epicenter (Mythology, 2011)
- Massimo Biolcati, Persona (ObliqSound, 2008)
- Terence Blanchard, Flow (Blue Note, 2005) – recorded in 2004
- Otis Brown III, The Thought of You (Blue Note, 2014)
- Terri Lyne Carrington, The Mosaic Project (Concord, 2011)
- Gerald Clayton, Life Forum (Concord, 2013)
- John Daversa, Artful Joy (BFM Jazz, 2012)
- John Ellis and Andy Bragen, The Ice Siren (Parade Light, 2020)
- Janek Gwizdala, Mystery to Me (self-released, 2004)
- Francis Jacob, Side-by-Side (2006)
- Sean Jones, Kaleidoscope (Mack Avenue, 2007)
- Shai Maestro, The Stone Skipper (Sound Surveyor, 2016)
- Gregoire Maret, Scenarios (ObliqSound, 2007)
- Keiko Matsui, Echo (Shanachie, 2019) – 1 track
- Nilson Matta, Black Orpheus (Motema, 2013)
- Marcus Miller, Renaissance (Concord Jazz, 2012) – 1 track
- Andy Milne, Forward in All Directions (Whirlwind, 2014)
- Jovino Santos Neto, Veja o Som (See the Sound) (Adventure, 2010)
- Aya Nishina, Flora (Tzadik, 2013)
- Joel Ross, Kingmaker (Blue Note, 2019)
- Joe Sanders, Introducing Joe Sanders (Criss Cross, 2012)
- Suresh Singaratnam, Jamie Reynolds, That Is You (Suresong, 2010)
- Nate Smith, Kinfolk: Postcards from Everywhere (Ropeadope, 2017)
- Walter Smith III, Casually Introducing Walter Smith III (Fresh Sound, 2006)
- Dayna Stephens, That Nepenthetic Place (Sunnyside, 2013) – recorded in 2010
