= Massimo Biolcati =

Swedish-Italian-American jazz bassist

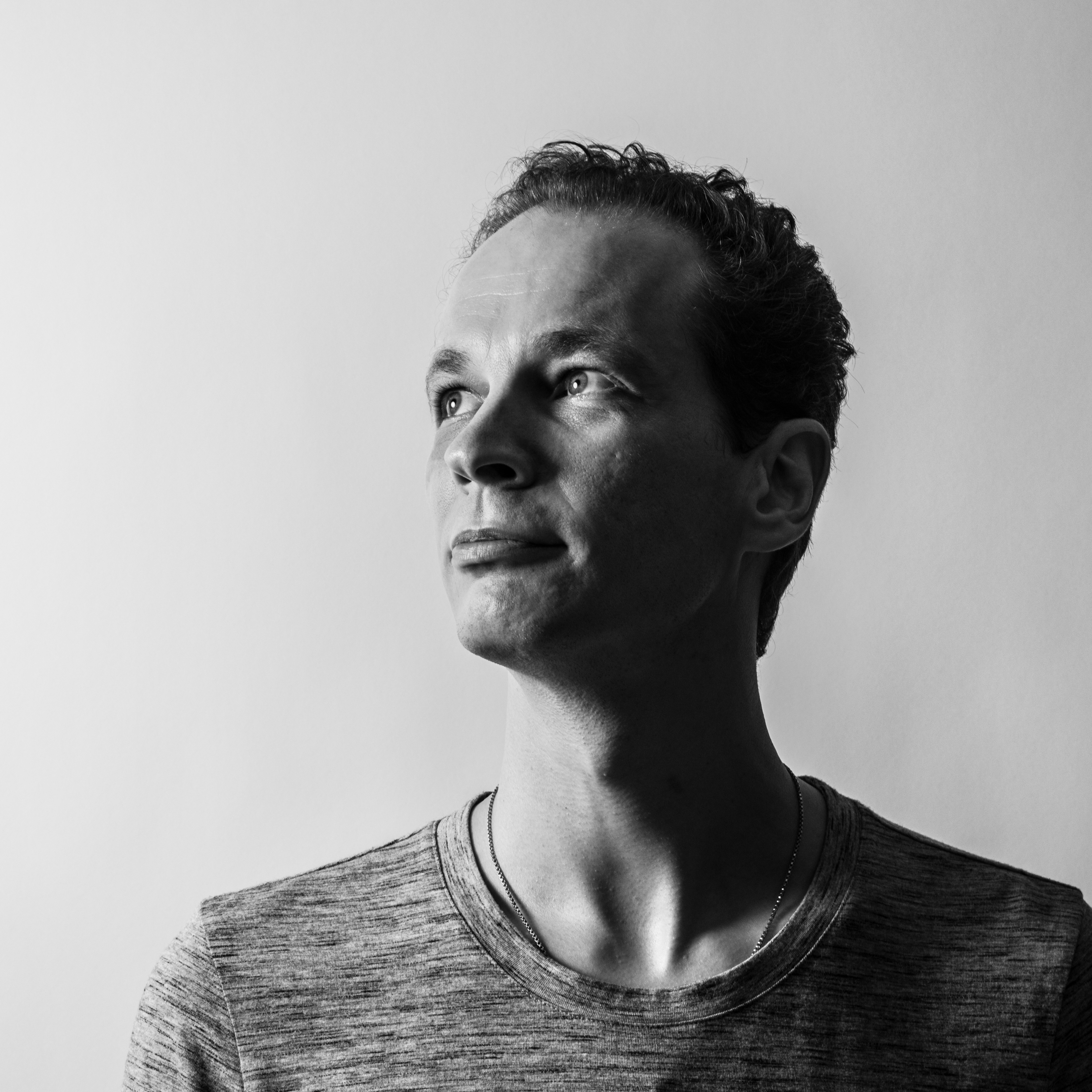
Massimo Biocati

Massimo Biolcati (born 1972) is a Swedish-Italian-American jazz bassist who is a member of Gilfema and the Lionel Loueke Trio. He is a core developer of iReal Pro app.
