= List of awards and nominations received by Terence Blanchard =

Terence Blanchard awards and nominations
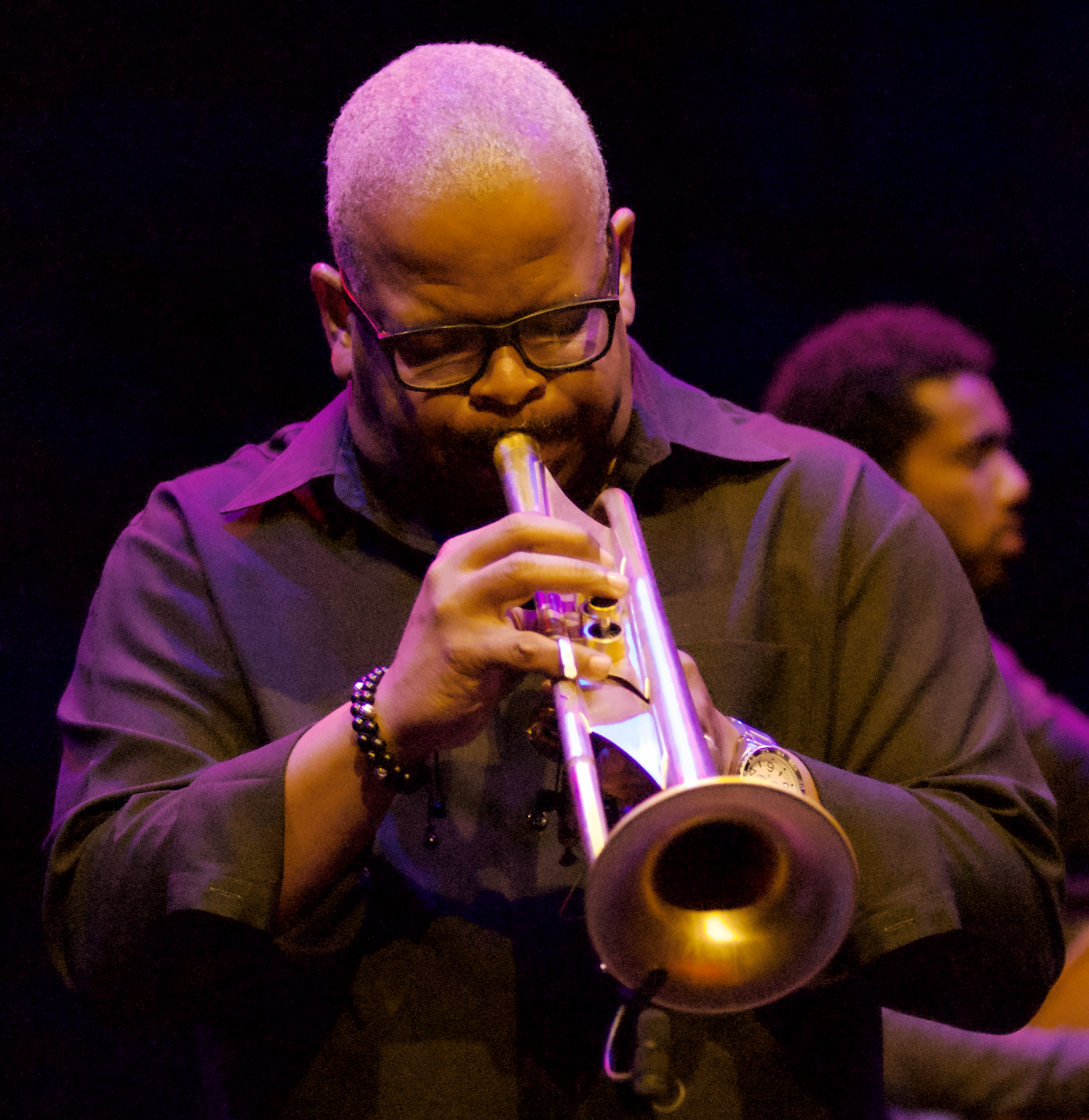
- Blanchard in 2014
Awards and nominations
Award	Wins	Nominations
Golden Globe	0	1
Grammy	5	16
Academy Awards	0	2
BAFTA Awards	0	1
Emmy Awards	0	1

Terence Blanchard is trumpeter, pianist and composer.

He is known for his extensive collaborations with Spike Lee. He has composed 18 of his films including Jungle Fever (1991), Malcolm X (1992), Crooklyn (1994), Clockers (1995), Summer of Sam (1999), Bamboozled (2000), 25th Hour (2002), She Hate Me (2004), Inside Man (2006), Miracle at St. Anna (2008), Chi-Raq (2015), BlacKkKlansman (2018), Da 5 Bloods (2020). He has composed other films such as Eve's Bayou (1997), Red Tails (2012), Harriet (2019), One Night in Miami... (2020), The Woman King (2022).

Blanchard has received numerous accolades including five Grammy Awards. He has also received two Academy Award for Best Original Score nominations for BlacKkKlansman (2018) and Da 5 Bloods (2020). He has also received nominations for a BAFTA Award, a Golden Globe Award, and a Primetime Emmy Award.

== Major associations ==
=== Academy Awards ===
Year	Category	Nominated work	Result	Ref.
2018	Best Original Score	BlacKkKlansman	Nominated	
2020	Best Original Score	Da 5 Bloods	Nominated	

=== BAFTA Awards ===
Year	Category	Nominated work	Result	Ref.
British Academy Film Awards
2018	Best Original Music	BlacKkKlansman	Nominated	

=== Emmy Award ===
Year	Category	Nominated work	Result	Ref.
Primetime Emmy Award
2022	Outstanding Music Composition for a Documentary Series	They Call Me Magic (Episode: Earvin)	Nominated	

=== Golden Globe Awards ===
Year	Category	Nominated work	Result	Ref.
2002	Best Original Score	25th Hour	Nominated	

=== Grammy Awards ===
Year	Category	Nominated work	Result	Ref.
1990	Best Jazz Instrumental Performance, Group	"Again Never"	Nominated	
1996	Best Latin Jazz Album	The Heart Speaks	Nominated	
2000	Best Jazz Instrumental Solo	"I Thought About You"	Nominated	
2001	Best Jazz Instrumental Solo	"Lost in a Fog"	Nominated	
2004	Best Jazz Instrumental Album	Illuminations	Won	
2005	Best Jazz Instrumental Album	Flow	Nominated	
2006	Best Long Form Music Video	Flow: Living in the Stream of Music	Nominated	
2007	Best Jazz Instrumental Solo	"Levees"	Nominated	
2007	Best Large Jazz Ensemble Album	A Tale of God's Will (A Requiem for Katrina)	Won	
2008	Best Jazz Instrumental Solo	"Be-Bop"	Won	
2009	Best Improvised Jazz Solo	"Dancin' 4 Chicken"	Won	
2013	Best Improvised Jazz Solo	"Don't Run"	Nominated	
2015	Best Jazz Instrumental Album	Breathless	Nominated	
2019	Best Instrumental Composition	"Blut und Boden (Blood and Soil)"	Won	
2021	Best Improvised Jazz Solo	"Absence"	Nominated	
2021	Best Jazz Instrumental Album	Absence	Nominated	

== Critics Awards ==
Year	Award	Category	Project	Result	Ref.
2002	Central Ohio Film Critics Association Awards	Best Score	25th Hour	Won	
2002	Las Vegas Film Critics Society Awards	Best Score	25th Hour	Won	
2008	Houston Film Critics Society Awards	Best Original Score	Miracle at St. Anna	Won	
2018	Columbus Film Critics Association Awards	Best Score	BlacKkKlansman	Nominated	
2018	Georgia Film Critics Association Awards	Best Original Score	BlacKkKlansman	Nominated	
2018	Hollywood Critics Association Film Awards	Best Score	BlacKkKlansman	Nominated	
2018	San Francisco Bay Area Film Critics Circle Awards	Best Original Score	BlacKkKlansman	Won	
2018	St. Louis Gateway Film Critics Association Awards	Best Score	BlacKkKlansman	Nominated	
2020	Austin Film Critics Association Awards	Best Score	Da 5 Bloods	Nominated	
2020	Chicago Film Critics Association Awards	Best Original Score	Da 5 Bloods	Nominated	
2020	DiscussingFilm Critics Awards	Best Original Score	Da 5 Bloods	Nominated	
2020	Greater Western New York Film Critics Association Awards	Best Score	Da 5 Bloods	Nominated	
2020	Hawaii Film Critics Society Awards	Best Original Score	Da 5 Bloods	Nominated	
2020	International Online Cinema Awards	Best Original Score	Da 5 Bloods	Nominated	
2020	Latino Entertainment Journalists Association Film Awards	Best Musical Score	Da 5 Bloods	Nominated	
2020	Music City Film Critics' Association Awards	Best Score	Da 5 Bloods	Nominated	
2020	Online Film Critics Society Awards	Best Original Score	Da 5 Bloods	Nominated	
2020	San Francisco Bay Area Film Critics Circle Awards	Best Original Score	Da 5 Bloods	Nominated	
2020	Seattle Film Critics Society Awards	Best Original Score	Da 5 Bloods	Nominated	
2020	Denver Film Critics Society Awards	Best Original Score	One Night in Miami...	Nominated	
2020	Indiana Film Journalists Association Awards	Best Musical Score	One Night in Miami...	Nominated	
2020	San Francisco Bay Area Film Critics Circle Awards	Best Original Score	One Night in Miami...	Nominated	

== Miscellaneous Awards ==
Year	Award	Category	Project	Result	Ref.
1991	Soul Train Music Awards	Best Jazz Album	Mo' Better Blues	Nominated	
1994	Soul Train Music Awards	Best Jazz Album	The Malcolm X Jazz Suite	Nominated	
2002	Satellite Awards	Best Original Score	25th Hour	Nominated	
2003	World Soundtrack Awards	Soundtrack Composer of the Year	25th Hour	Nominated	
2005	Black Reel Awards	Outstanding Original Score	She Hate Me	Nominated	
2007	Black Reel Awards	Outstanding Original Score	Inside Man	Nominated	
2008	OffBeat's Best of The Beat Awards	Best Contemporary Jazz Band or Performer		Won	
2009	BMI Awards	Classic Contribution Award	Himself	Won	
2009	OffBeat's Best of The Beat Awards	Best Contemporary Jazz Band or Performer		Won	
2009	OffBeat's Best of The Beat Awards	Best Contemporary Jazz Album	Choices	Won	
2013	Black Reel Awards	Outstanding Original Score	Red Tails	Nominated	
2013	OffBeat's Best of The Beat Awards	Best Contemporary Jazz Band or Performer		Won	
2013	Soul Train Music Awards	Best Traditional Jazz Artist/Group	"Pet Step Sitter's Theme Song"	Nominated	
2015	OffBeat's Best of The Beat Awards	Best Contemporary Jazz Band or Performer		Won	
2015	OffBeat's Best of The Beat Awards	Best Contemporary Jazz Album	Breathless	Won	
2015	Black Reel Awards	Outstanding Original Score	Black or White	Nominated	
2016	Black Reel Awards	Outstanding Original Score	Chi-Raq	Nominated	
2018	Black Reel Awards	Outstanding Original Score	BlacKkKlansman	Nominated	
2018	Hollywood Music in Media Awards	Best Original Score in a Feature Film	BlacKkKlansman	Nominated	
2018	Satellite Awards	Best Original Score	BlacKkKlansman	Nominated	
2019	Hollywood Music in Media Awards	Best Original Score in a Feature Film	Harriet	Nominated	
2019	Satellite Awards	Best Original Score	Harriet	Nominated	
2020	Venice Film Festival	Campari Passion for the Cinema Award		Won	
2020	Society of Composers & Lyricists Awards	Outstanding Original Score for a Studio Film	Da 5 Bloods	Nominated	
2020	Society of Composers & Lyricists Awards	Spirit of Collaboration Award (Shared with Spike Lee)		Won	
2021-22	OffBeat's Best of The Beat Awards	Best Contemporary Jazz Band or Performer		Won	
2021-22	OffBeat's Best of The Beat Awards	Best Contemporary Jazz Album	Absence (with the E-Collective and the Turtle Island Quartet)	Won	
2019	Satellite Awards	Best Original Score	One Night in Miami	Nominated	
2022	Hollywood Music in Media Awards	Best Original Score in a Feature Film	The Woman King	Won	
2023	OffBeat's Best of The Beat Awards	Best Contemporary Jazz Artist		Won	
2023	OffBeat's Best of The Beat Awards	Best Trumpeter		Won	
2024	APAP's Merit Award	Achievement in the performing arts		style="background: #9EFF9E; color: #000; vertical-align: middle; text-align: center; " class="yes table-yes2 notheme"|Won	
