= Magnetic (Terence Blanchard album) =

Studio album by Terence Blanchard
- Released: 28 May 2013
- Studios: Avatar (New York, New York)
- Genre: Jazz
- Length: 1:07:58
- Label: Blue Note 509999 03354 2 6
- Producers: Terence Blanchard, Robin Burgess, Frank Wolf

Terence Blanchard chronology
Chano y Dizzy! (2011)	Magnetic (2013)	Breathless (2015)

Professional ratings
Review scores
Source	Rating
About Entertainment	3/5 stars
All About Jazz	4.5/5 stars
AllMusic	4/5 stars
The Baltimore Sun	3/4 stars
The Buffalo News	3.5/4 stars
Financial Times	4/5 stars
Los Angeles Times	3/4 stars
PopMatters	7/10 stars
Stereophile	5/5 stars
Tom Hull	B+
Toronto Star	3/4 stars

Magnetic is a studio album by jazz trumpeter Terence Blanchard. The album was released on 28 May 2013 by Blue Note Records. Magnetic is his return to the label after a period of six years. The record contains 10 original tracks by band members. For track "Don't Run", the album was nominated in 2014 for Grammy Award for Best Improvised Jazz Solo.

== Reception ==
Thomas Conrad of JazzTimes wrote "The 10 tracks, all originals by band members, unfold as varied, often-startling narratives. There are continuous episodic transitions, viewpoints shifting within the ensemble, foregrounds becoming backgrounds, unisons becoming counterpoint and counterpoint becoming, organically, solos. Blanchard’s trumpet eruptions on pieces like Almazan’s “Pet Step Sitter’s Theme Song” and Winston's “Time to Spare” are ferocious yet technically exact, and that is before he turns himself into a trumpet orchestra with electronics. (Blanchard's swirling “Hallucinations” is an exemplary aesthetic application of digital technology.) Coltrane's soprano saxophone swoops into Blanchard's “Don’t Run” like ecstasy unleashed. Winston's concise statements are so integral to each tune that they feel less like solos than meticulous personal clarifications. Almazan knocks you down with brute force, touches your heart with lyricism and dizzies your brain with intricacy, all in the first minute of his five-minute piano epic, “Comet.” Halfway through 2013, here is a clear candidate for Record of the Year." Jeff Simon of The Buffalo News observed, "Blanchard has always been a great trumpet player and a first-rate jazz composer both." Chris Barton of The Baltimore Sun commented, "...Blanchard is said to be inspired by a recent exploration of Buddhism. His journey in "Magnetic" may take many turns, but it's worth sticking with."

Chris Barton of Los Angeles Times commented "...Blanchard is said to be inspired by a recent exploration of Buddhism. His journey in "Magnetic" may take many turns, but it's worth sticking with". Geraldine Wyckoff of Offbeat added "Terence Blanchard brilliantly continues his life-long exploration of jazz on his latest release. As one would expect of a musician of his caliber, broad experience, talent and passion, the trumpeter, composer and arranger brings his all to every work. .. Magnetic is serious jazz music that through its spirit and the artists’ vivid execution is able to instigate a smile and even a laugh." Financial Times 's Mike Hobart mentioned, "Terence Blanchard’s absorbing showcase for his muscular and sensitive working quintet unfolds like the atmospheric film scores the trumpeter crafts for Spike Lee."

== Track listing ==
No.	Title	Writer(s)	Length
1.	"Magnetic"	Terence Blanchard	7:02
2.	"Jacob's Ladder"	Joshua Crumbly	7:59
3.	"Don't Run"	Blanchard	7:29
4.	"Pet Step Sitter's Theme Song"	Fabian Almazan	10:31
5.	"Hallucinations"	Blanchard	8:42
6.	"No Borders Just Horizons"	Kendrick Scott	7:21
7.	"Comet"	Almazan	4:53
8.	"Central Focus"	Blanchard	4:31
9.	"Another Step"	Almazan	2:34
10.	"Time to Spare"	Brice Winston	6:56
Total length:			1:07:58

== Personnel ==
Band

- Terence Blanchard – trumpet
- Fabian Almazan-piano
- Ron Carter – bass(tracks 1 & 3)
- Joshua Crumbly – bass
- Kendrick Scott-drums
- Lionel Loueke – guitar(tracks 4, 5, & 9)
- Ravi Coltrane – tenor saxophone(tracks 3 & 4)
- Brice Winston – tenor saxophone

Production

- Hayden Miller – art direction, design
- Frank Wolf – engineer, co-producer
- Robin Burgess – management, producer
- Gavin Lurssen – mastering
- Nitin Vadukul – photographer

== Chart performance ==
Chart (2013)	Peak position
US Traditional Jazz Albums (Billboard)	7
Billboard 200	9
