= Camila Meza =

Chilean guitarist, singer, and songwriter

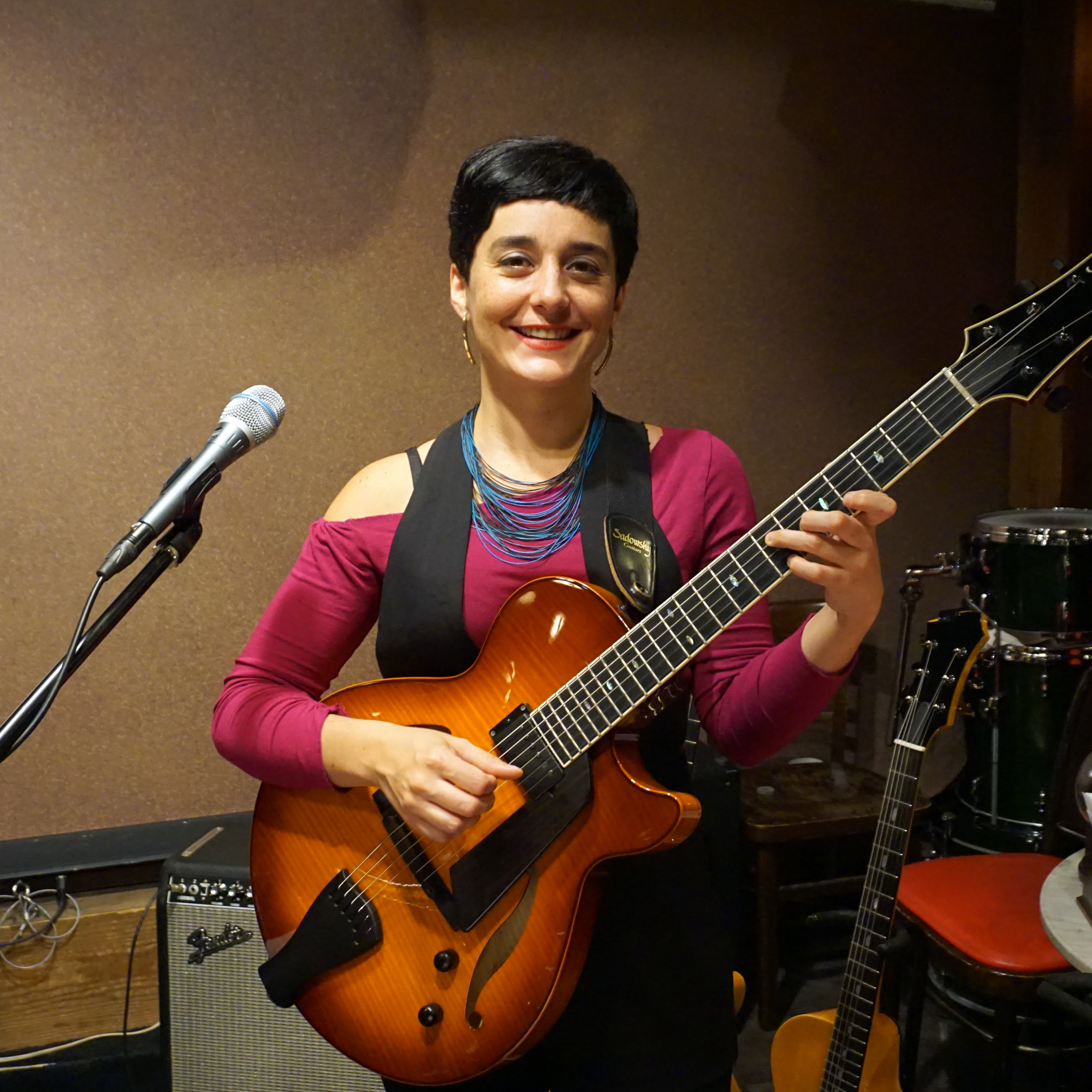
- Camila Meza in Aoyama 2017

Background information
- Born: July 22, 1985; Santiago, Chile
- Genres: Jazz
- Occupation: Musician
- Instrument: Guitar
- Website: camilameza.com

Camila Meza (born 22 July 1985) is a Chilean jazz guitarist, singer, and songwriter.

== Biography ==
Meza is musically inspired by jazz guitarists like George Benson and Pat Metheny as well as being influenced by South American music and folk, she first studied with Jorge Vidal and Jorge Díaz. Increasingly oriented to Claudia Acuña from the mid-2000s she worked on the jazz scene of her hometown, where her first recording Giovanni Cultrera, Espinoza y Cia (Navidad en Jazz) was released in 2005. In 2007 she presented her debut album Skylark (Stateside).

In 2009 Meza moved to New York to study guitar at The New School with Peter Bernstein, Vic Juris and Steve Cardenas. Since then she also has worked on the New York jazz scene with Ryan Keberle (Into the Zone, 2014), Lucas Pino, Fabian Almazan and directs her own jazz octet, The Nectar Orchestra. She recorded for Sunnyside Records the album Traces (2016, with Shai Maestro, Matt Penman, Kendrick Scott, Bashiri Johnson, Jody Redhage, Sachal Vasandani), sings Spanish and English, and won two Independent Music Awards as the Best Adult Contemporary Album and Best Latin Song ("Para Volar"). Also on the albums Find the Common, Shine a Light by Ryan Keberle and Sounds from the Deep Field by Bryan Copeland she seemed outstanding in the opinion of the critics.

As a singer she can also be heard on Carolina Calvache's Ballad "La Última Vez". In 2017 the Camila Meza Quartet performed at the Festival Jazzahead. The following year she brought Gina Schwarz as part of her Pannonica project, Porgy &amp; Bess in Vienna. Meza was nominated in the category of guitarist and female singer as a Rising Star in the critics poll of the Down Beat in 2018

Nate Chinen described Meza's vocals as "an appealing combination of lightness and depth [...], that sings with a bright, clear voice against the agile uproar of a world-class band." in The New York Times. The discographer Tom Lord lists them between 2005 and 2015 with participation in eight recording sessions.

== Discography ==
=== As leader ===
- Skylark (Vértice, 2007)
- Retrato (Vertice, 2009)
- Prisma (CD Baby, 2013) – recorded in 2011
- Traces (Sunnyside, 2016)
- Ambar with The Nectar Orchestra (Masterworks, 2019) – recorded in 2017

=== As guest ===
With Fabian Almazan

- 2013: Rhizome (Blue Note, 2014)
- 2016: Alcanza (Biophilia, 2017)

With Ryan Keberle & Catharsis

- Into The Zone (Greenleaf Music, 2014)
- Azul Infinito (Greenleaf Music, 2016)
- The Hope I Hold (Greenleaf Music, 2019) – recorded in 2018

With others

- Adrian Cunningham & La Lucha, New Holiday Classics (Arbors, 2020)
- Dave Douglas, Overcome (Greenleaf Music, 2020)
- Adi Meyerson, Where We Stand (A:M, 2018)
- Ziv Ravitz, No Man Is An Island (Sound Surveyor Music, 2019)
