= Chano y Dizzy! =

Studio album by Poncho Sanchez & Terence Blanchard
- Released: September 27, 2011
- Recorded: 2011
- Studios: Henson Recording Studios, Los Angeles.
- Genre: Latin jazz
- Length: 55:07
- Label: Concord Records
- Producers: Poncho Sanchez, Francisco Torres

Terence Blanchard chronology
| Choices (2009) | Chano y Dizzy! (2011) | Magnetic (2013) |

Professional ratings
Review scores
| Source | Rating |
|---|---|
| AllMusic | 4/5 stars |
| Jazzwise | 3/5 stars |

Chano y Dizzy! is a collaborative studio album by conga player Poncho Sanchez and jazz trumpeter Terence Blanchard. The release contains 11 tracks inspired by the works of Dizzy Gillespie and Chano Pozo whose short-lived musical collaboration began in the late 1940s and ended after Pozo's murder in 1948. The album was released by Concord on September 27, 2011. In 2012, the album was nominated for Latin Grammy Award for Best Latin Jazz/Jazz Album.

== Reception ==
Jeff Tamarkin in his review for JazzTimes wrote, "Using standard Latin orchestra instrumentation-congas, bongos, timbales and drums; saxophones, trumpet and trombone; piano, bass and vocals-Sanchez and Blanchard raid the Gillespie/Pozo catalog, recycle a couple of Blanchard’s favorites and cherry-pick the rest, including three from trombonist Francisco Torres, who co-produced this session with Sanchez. " Brian Boyles of Offbeat commented, "If there’s anything lacking here, it may be the original soil. We find two artists at ease in their exchange and shared vocabulary; here is Latin jazz in perfect form. The sound is a sure-handed culmination of 60 years of music, rather than a risky return to some genesis moment. Hopefully such a well-crafted door will beckon others to pass through and investigate that still-fertile landscape." AllMusic's Matt Collar added, "An inspired and heartfelt tribute, Chano y Dizzy! is a must-hear for Latin jazz fans as well as longtime Sanchez and Blanchard listeners."

Howard Reich of the Chicago Tribune observed, "Blanchard's piercing top notes, high-velocity figurations and lyrical asides attested to his stature as trumpet virtuoso and creative improviser. The carefully conceived orchestral scoring – meticulously played by Sanchez's octet – stood in striking contrast to Blanchard's freely improvised solo flights."

== Track listing ==
| No. | Title | Writer(s) | Length |
|---|---|---|---|
| 1. | "Chano Pozo Medley: Tin Tin Deo / Manteca / Guachi Guaro" | Walter Fuller, Dizzy Gillespie, Chano Pozo | 6:47 |
| 2. | "Con Alma" | Dizzy Gillespie | 5:31 |
| 3. | "Wandering Wonder" | Terence Blanchard | 2:58 |
| 4. | "Siboney" | Ernesto Lecuona | 4:54 |
| 5. | "Dizzy's Dashiki" | David Torres | 4:07 |
| 6. | "Groovin' High" | Dizzy Gillespie | 5:19 |
| 7. | "Nocturna" | Ivan Lins, Vitor Martins | 6:23 |
| 8. | "Harris' Walk" | Ron Blake | 4:46 |
| 9. | "Promenade" | Francisco Torres | 5:29 |
| 10. | "Jack's Dilemma" | Francisco Torres | 4:04 |
| 11. | "Ariñañara" | Chano Pozo | 4:16 |
| Total length: | | | 55:07 |

== Personnel ==
- Tony Banda – bass, vocals
- Ron Francis Blake – trumpet
- Terence Blanchard – trumpet
- Joey De Leon, Jr. – bongos, drums, percussion
- Rob Hardt – sax (alto), sax (tenor)
- George Ortiz – timbales
- Poncho Sanchez – congas, percussion, vocals
- David Torres – piano
- Francisco Torres – trombone, vocals

== Chart performance ==
| Chart (2011) | Peak position |
|---|---|
| US Traditional Jazz Albums (Billboard) | 9 |
| Billboard 200 | 18 |
