= Biophilia Records =

American record label

- Founded: 2011
- Founder: Fabian Almazan
- Genre: jazz, world, rock, classical, hip hop
- Country of origin: United States
- Location: Harlem, New York
- Official website: www.biophiliarecords.com

Biophilia Records is an American record label founded in 2011 by musician Fabian Almazan in Harlem, New York. The music label takes an environmentally-conscious approach in its packaging and distribution.

Among the artists on Biophilia Records are bassist Linda May Han Oh; percussionist, composer, and vocalist Rajna Swaminathan, María Grand, Justin Brown, as well as Almazan himself.

== History ==
Havana, Cuba-born Almazan grew up in Miami, Florida, and became a jazz pianist and studied at the Manhattan School of Music. The Grammy-nominated pianist and composer, performed his own music, while also working with Terence Blanchard. In addition, he performed on film scores for Spike Lee and George Lucas.

Drawing inspiration from biologist Edward O. Wilson's book Biophilia, which is a study in the interaction of humans and the environment, he formed Biophilia Records in 2011 based on that philosophy. Almazan opened the Biophilia Records office in Harlem, first releasing his own, Personalities, then others including Endless Field's eponymous album, Linda May Han Oh's Walk Against the Wind, and 19 more albums over the years.

== Philosophy ==
Biophilia Records releases all its music on double-sided, 20-panel origami-like packages that include the artwork and liner notes for the album's artist. The package does not contain a CD, instead includes on one of its 20 panels, a code for purchasers to download the music online. Almazan trademarked the packaging as Biopholio™ to offer the music industry an environmentally friendly option.

"There’s this current movement towards vinyl," said Almazan. "But I couldn’t in good conscience start a label and make vinyl and CDs knowing there are already hundreds of thousands of tons of plastic in the ocean, not to mention on land."

Biophilia works with its artists to volunteer with local environmental and sustainability causes, and invites fans to volunteer alongside them at events such as marshland cleanups, tree plantings and free community performances for public school children. Label artists gave a solar-powered Earth Day concert in New York's Union Square on March 18, 2017, in partnership with BioBus, a mobile laboratory that brings science to the city's children.

== Artists ==
- Fabian Almazan
- Linda May Han Oh
- Lara Bello
- Desmond White
- Charlie Christenson
- Rajna Swaminathan
- Adam O’Farrill
- María Grand
- Justin Brown
- Endless Field (Jesse Lewis and Ike Sturm)
- The Awakening Orchestra & Kyle Saulnier
- Stranger Days
- Bryan and the Aardvarks
- Charlie Christenson
- Lara Bello

== Discography ==
Year	Artist	Album	Notes
2011	Bryan and the Aardvarks	Heroes of Make Believe	
2012	Fabian Almazan	Personalities	
2013	Desmond White	Short Stories	
2013	Charlie Christenson	Shipwreckee	
2014	The Similar Prisoners	My World Keeps Falling	
2015	Andréa Wood	Kaleidoscope	
2015	Fabian Almazan	"Somewhere in the Waves"	Soundtrack single
2016	The Awakening Orchestra	Interlude: Atticus Live!	
2017	Fabian Almazan	Alcanza	
2017	Endless Field	Endless Field	
2017	Linda May Han Oh	Walk Against the Wind	
2017	Lara Bello	Sikame	
2017	Bryan and the Aardvarks	Sounds From The Deep Field	
2017	Desmond White	Glace	
2018	Maria Grand	Magdalena	
2018	Justin Brown	NYEUSI	
2018	Adam O'Farrill	El Maquech	
2018	Kim Anderson	Yarrow	
2019	Rajna Swaminathan	Agency and Abstraction	
2019	Linda May Han Oh	Aventurine	
2019	Fabian Almazan	This Land Abounds With Life	
2019	Desmond White	"Gone"	Single
2020	Endless Field	Alive in the Wilderness	
