= Live (Terence Blanchard album) =

Live album by Terence Blanchard
- Released: April 20, 2018
- Venues: The Bop Stop, Cleveland, OH; The Dakota, St Paul, MN; The Wyley Theater, Dallas, TX
- Genre: Jazz
- Length: 1:15:47
- Label: Blue Note
- Producers: Robin Burgess, Terence Blanchard, Frank Wolf

Terence Blanchard chronology
Breathless (2015)	Live (2018)	Absence (2021)

Professional ratings
Review scores
Source	Rating
All About Jazz	4/5 stars
AllMusic	4/5 stars
Financial Times	3/5 stars
Jazz Forum	3.5/5 stars
Jazzwise	4/5 stars
Le Devoir	3.5/5 stars
Tom Hull	B+

Live is an album by American jazz trumpeter Terence Blanchard. The album was released on April 20, 2018, by Blue Note. This is the second album for Blanchard's band E-Collective, with Charles Altura on guitar, Fabian Almazan on piano and synthesizers, David Ginyard on bass, and Oscar Seaton on drums.

== Background ==
Just as the preceding album Breathless, the present record explores the painful themes of racism, gun violence, and hate in the modern America. The E-Collective includes Blanchard on trumpet, playing alongside guitarist Charles Altura, pianist Fabian Almazan, drummer Oscar Seaton, and bassist David “DJ” Ginyard. The "Live" tour also featured Tondrae Kemp on vocals. Live’s tracks were recorded during the concerts performed in three cities where confrontations between the police and African Americans escalated into unconscionable tragedy. In Cleveland, a 12-year-old boy was fatally shot by police in 2014; in Dallas, five police officers were killed in an ambush in 2016; and in St. Paul, just days before the Dallas murders, a police officer fatally shot a black motorist during a traffic stop outside the city.

The five out of seven compositions in the album are written by Blanchard. Track 7 features the voice of Dr. Cornel West.

== Reception ==
Lucas Phillips of The Boston Globe wrote "From the first moment of Terence Blanchard’s “Live,” a moody drone creeping up from beneath the applause, there is the unmistakable feeling that something drastic took place just before it. It's like the scene in a movie right after a violent climax where everyone is left to figure out what the heck just happened: Cue the music... The result is the honest, troubled vision of an onlooker trying to bring into sound the feelings of desolation, empowerment, anger, and confusion those incidents brought to their communities."

Sammy Stein of Something Else! noted "... a great album musically, and it is clear Terence Blanchard has surrounded himself with accomplished and devastatingly capable musicians, well able to interpret his compositional works. I would like to hear this in concert, as it feels a little like some of the energy and freneticism is lost in the recording. The noise is softened, the aggression somehow quieted, as if just a tad afraid to fully unleash. Any holding back of emotion, however, is made up for in the sheer musicality of the band. This is a great album, and one worthy of many listens." Writing for Offbeat, Geraldine Wyckoff commented, "Having such a vital theme and being performed in concert settings, Live shares a strong resemblance to a suite of music, as did Breathless. They stand together in purpose and passion."

== Track listing ==
No.	Title	Writer(s)	Length
1.	"Hannibal"	Marcus Miller	11:00
2.	"Kaos"	Blanchard	12:07
3.	"Unchanged"	Charles Altura	13:27
4.	"Soldiers"	Blanchard	8:23
5.	"Dear Jimi"	Blanchard	4:45
6.	"Can Anyone Hear Me"	Blanchard	8:55
7.	"Choices"	Blanchard	17:10
Total length:			1:15:47

== Personnel ==
Band

- Terence Blanchard – keyboards, producer, trumpet
- Fabian Almazan – keyboards, piano
- Charles Altura – guitar (electric)
- David Ginyard – bass (electric)
- Oscar Seaton – drums
- Tondrae Kemp – vocals (live)
- Dr. Cornel West – spoken word

Production

- Henry Adebonojo – photography
- Robin Burgess – producer
- Gavin Lurssen – mastering
- Paul Moore – design
- Andrew F. Scott – cover art
- Frank Wolf – engineer, mixing, producer
- Tondrae Kemp – tour manager

== Chart performance ==
Chart (2018)	Peak position
US Traditional Jazz Albums (Billboard)	8
Billboard 200	20
