= Let's Get Lost =

Let's Get Lost may refer to:

== Films ==
- Let's Get Lost (1988 film), an Oscar-nominated documentary about jazz trumpeter Chet Baker
- Let's Get Lost (1997 film), a Danish drama film

== Music ==
=== Albums ===
- Let's Get Lost (album), a 2001 album by Terence Blanchard

=== Songs ===
- "Let's Get Lost" (song), a classic jazz song by Jimmy McHugh and Frank Loesser from the 1943 film Happy Go Lucky, recorded by Chet Baker and others
- "Let's Get Lost", a song by dEUS from their 1994 album Worst Case Scenario
- "Let's Get Lost", a song by Elliott Smith from his 2004 album From a Basement on the Hill
- "Let's Get Lost", a 2010 song by Beck and Bat for Lashes from The Twilight Saga: Eclipse soundtrack
- "Let's Get Lost", a song by G-Eazy from his 2014 album These Things Happen
- "Let's Get Lost", a track on Carly Rae Jepsen's 2015 album Emotion
- "Let/s Get Lost", a track on The Twilight Sad's 2019 album It Won/t Be Like This All the Time
- "Let's Get Lost", a song by Nebula from their 2019 album Holy Shit

== Other ==
- Let's Get Lost, a young adult novel by Sarra Manning
