= Choices (Terence Blanchard album) =

Studio album by Terence Blanchard
- Released: August 18, 2009
- Recorded: March 5–8, 2009
- Studios: The Ogden Museum of Southern Art, New Orleans, LA.
- Genre: Jazz
- Length: 1:13:45
- Labels: Concord Jazz 088072317369; Universal Music Group International 088072317369
- Producers: Terence Blanchard, Robin Burgess, Frank Wolf

Terence Blanchard chronology
| A Tale of God's Will (2007) | Choices (2009) | Chano y Dizzy! (2011) |

Professional ratings
Review scores
| Source | Rating |
|---|---|
| All About Jazz | 5/5 stars |
| AllMusic | 3.5/5 stars |
| Billboard | 3.5/5 stars |
| Financial Times | 3/5 stars |
| The Guardian | 4/5 stars |
| Jazzwise | 4/5 stars |
| Sunday Express | 3/5 |
| Tom Hull | B+ |

Choices is a studio album by American jazz trumpeter Terence Blanchard. The album was released on August 18, 2009, via Concord Jazz and Universal Music Group International labels.

== Background ==
The idea for Choices was generated by conversations between Blanchard and Herbie Hancock during their joint tour in Fall 2008. The album is a loose sequel to Blanchard's previous Grammy-winning 2007 record, A Tale of God's Will (A Requiem for Katrina). Choices centers on broader questions about free will and personal responsibility. On several compositions the album features the voice of Cornel West, a notable socialist philosopher, civil rights activist, critic, and teacher of both religion and African American studies at Princeton University. Blanchard substantially bases the album's title and its conceptual backstory on the West's discourse on the nature of choice and the kind of people we may choose to be.

== Reception ==
Mike Hobart of Financial Times stated "The flowing post-modal jazz, bubbling rhythm section and fluent solos are great. Blanchard’s smooth-centred sound packs punch, pianist Fabian Almazan delivers pinpoint textures and bass and drums subtly complete the picture. Bilal adds low-key vocals and Lionel Loueke trademark guitar." Thom Jurek of AllMusic commented "Choices is a musically expansive, challenging recording that engages its title's subject matter critically and liberally without beating the listener over the head with it. It should appeal not only to jazzheads but open-minded music fans of all stripes. This set has plenty of class and sophistication, but it also speculatively reflects musical and intellectual history and mystery too".

Dan Ouellette of Billboard wrote "the New Orleans–based trumpeter/composer embarks on a new, dramatic song cycle that plumbs the depths of personal and societal decision-making. In addition to his band, "Choices" features special guests: Lionel Loueke provides imaginative guitar parts, Dr. Cornel West delivers provocative spoken-word interludes, and vocalist Bilal sings on a pair of R&B beauties. Blanchard has never sounded better on trumpet-his most passionate playing appears on the samba-like "Journey," on which he supports Bilal, and the 12-minute lyrical sojourn "Winding Roads." Other standouts include the Bilal-sung "When Will You Call" and the upbeat "Robin's Choice." Robert Spellman of Sunday Express added "Blanchard, joined by his closest players, follows with plaintive, tumbling, free-flowing jams that cannot fail to engage the jazz listener".

== Track listing ==
| No. | Title | Writer(s) | Length |
|---|---|---|---|
| 1. | "Byus" | Walter Smith III | 6:47 |
| 2. | "Beethoven" | Terence Blanchard | 0:54 |
| 3. | "D's Choice" | Blanchard | 3:47 |
| 4. | "Journey" | Kendrick Scott | 6:02 |
| 5. | "Hacia del Aire" | Fabian Almazan | 7:11 |
| 6. | "Jazz Man in the World of Ideas" | | 0:40 |
| 7. | "Him or Me" | Smith III | 4:21 |
| 8. | "Choices" | Blanchard | 6:10 |
| 9. | "Hugs" (Historically Underrepresented Groups) | Almazan | 6:31 |
| 10. | "Winding Roads" | Derrick Hodge | 12:19 |
| 11. | "When Will You Call" | Bilal Oliver | 4:27 |
| 12. | "A New Note Angel" | | 0:55 |
| 13. | "A New World" (Created Inside the Walls of Imagination) | Hodge | 5:17 |
| 14. | "Touched by an Angel" | Scott | 6:05 |
| 15. | "Robin's Choice" | Blanchard | 2:19 |
| Total length: | | | 1:13:45 |

== Personnel ==
- Derrick Hodge – acoustic bass, electric bass
- Kendrick Scott – drums, percussion
- Chris Finney – assistant engineer
- Lionel Loueke – guitar
- Pat Sullivan – mastering
- Fabian Almazan – piano
- Robin Burgess, Frank Wolf – producer
- Terence Blanchard – producer, trumpet, synthesizer
- Walter Smith III – saxophone
