= Jazz in Film =

Studio album by Terence Blanchard
- Released: March 2, 1999
- Recorded: March 17–18, 1998; Signet Soundelux, Los Angeles; April 7, 1998; Clinton Recording Studios, Studio B, New York City
- Genre: Jazz
- Length: 68:19
- Labels: Sony; SK 60671
- Producer: Terence Blanchard

Terence Blanchard chronology
The Heart Speaks (1996)	Jazz in Film (1999)	Wandering Moon (2000)

Jazz in Film is a studio album by American trumpeter Terence Blanchard released on March 2, 1999, via Sony Records.

== Background ==
The album was meant to be a portrait of jazz in cinema history, a way to chronicle the evolution of jazz score from the late 1940s to present day, and features highly influential themes from classics like Anatomy of a Murder, Taxi Driver and seminal noir The Man With the Golden Arm. Blanchard carves out a little space for himself, revisiting one of his compositions written for Spike Lee's Clockers.

The albums features an all-star lineup, including veteran saxophonist Joe Henderson and pianist Kenny Kirkland, amongst others, backed by a string orchestra arranged by Blanchard.

== Critical reception ==
Professional ratings
Review scores
Source	Rating
AllMusic	4/5 stars
The Penguin Guide to Jazz	4/4 stars

Ed Kopp of All About Jazz stated, "If you're attracted to jazz that evokes late nights, dark corners and glittering cityscapes, Jazz In Film is a must-have. This is about as classy a collection of after-hours jazz as you're likely to hear. The music is emotional, strongly melodic and beautifully atmospheric."

Ben Ratliff of The New York Times noted, "Jazz in Film (Sony Classical), a set of movie themes done with jazz musicians and an orchestra; the resulting set was almost a perfect mixture of precise assembly and improvisational small-group heat."

Paula Edelstein of AllMusic wrote, "Accompanied by contemporary jazz masters such as Kenny Kirkland, Joe Henderson and Donald Harrison, the set features the precision and emotional flair Blanchard is known for. His interpretations of Goldsmith's score from Chinatown and Martin Scorsese's Taxi Driver remain true to the original compositions. However, Blanchard's jazz execution develops and adds another dimension to the psychological turmoil their themes explore. His masterful use of a jazz ensemble with an orchestra to exemplify the music of such great composers as Elmer Bernstein ("Man with the Golden Arm)" exudes maturity and surpasses the excellence of his previous scoring efforts on the jazz-flavored score for Eve's Bayou."

== Track listing ==
1. "A Streetcar Named Desire" (Alex North) - 7:55
2. "Chinatown" (Jerry Goldsmith) - 8:23
3. "The Subterraneans" (André Previn) - 9:08
4. "Anatomy of a Murder" (Duke Ellington) - 8:25
5. "The Pawnbroker" (Quincy Jones) - 7:02
6. "Taxi Driver" (Bernard Herrmann) - 7:12
7. "Degas' Racing World" (Ellington) - 7:57
8. "Man With the Golden Arm" (Elmer Bernstein) - 4:13
9. "Clockers" (Terence Blanchard) - 8:01

Tracks 2 3 6 7 8 9 recorded on March 17–18, 1998; Tracks 1 4 5 on April 7, 1998.

== Personnel ==
- Terence Blanchard - trumpet, arranger
- Steven Mercurio - conductor
- J.A.C. Redford - conductor
- Kenny Kirkland - piano
- Reginald Veal - bass
- Carl Allen - drums
- Joe Henderson - tenor saxophone (3, 6–9)
- Steve Turre - trombone (1, 4, 8)
- Donald Harrison - alto sax (1, 4–5)

== Chart performance ==
Chart (1999)	Peak position
US Traditional Jazz Albums (Billboard)	10
Billboard 200	28
