= In My Solitude: The Billie Holiday Songbook =

Studio album by Terence Blanchard
- Released: March 29, 1994
- Recorded: October 20–29, 1993
- Genre: Jazz
- Length: 52:27
- Label: Columbia
- Producer: Terence Blanchard

Terence Blanchard chronology
The Malcolm X Jazz Suite (1993)	In My Solitude: The Billie Holiday Songbook (1994)	Romantic Defiance (1995)

Professional ratings
Review scores
Source	Rating
AllMusic	4/5 stars
The Encyclopedia of Popular Music	3/5 stars
The Penguin Guide to Jazz	3/4 stars
The Rolling Stone Jazz & Blues Album Guide	3.5/5 stars

In My Solitude: The Billie Holiday Songbook is a 1994 jazz album by American trumpeter Terence Blanchard and vocalist Jeanie Bryson, released on the Columbia label.

== Critical reception ==
Scott Yanow of AllMusic stated: "Trumpeter Terence Blanchard's tribute to Billie Holiday is a rather melancholy and often downbeat affair. Sounding less original than usual (he displays a strong Wynton Marsalis influence and also hints at times at both Miles Davis and Thad Jones), there is little joy to these renditions of Lady Day material other than the second half of "I Cried for You." The trumpeter's arrangements for the unswinging string section is occasionally oppressive, sometimes border on muzak and tends to weigh down the music." Zan Stewart of the Los Angeles Times added "...Blanchard will explore an earlier era on "In My Solitude: The Billie Holiday Songbook" (Columbia), his fat, sassy trumpet tone accompanied by a string section".

== Track listing ==
Track	Song title	Vocals	Time
1.	Detour Ahead	Jeanie Bryson	4:32
2.	Nice Work If You Can Get It	Jeanie Bryson	4:36
3.	In My Solitude		3:39
4.	What a Little Moonlight Can Do	Jeanie Bryson	4:01
5.	Good Morning Heartache		4:38
6.	I Cried for You		3:42
7.	Don't Explain		4:10
8.	Fine and Mellow	Jeanie Bryson	4:37
9.	Cover the Waterfront		4:34
10.	Left Alone		8:02
11.	Strange Fruit	Jeanie Bryson	3:48
12.	Lady Sings the Blues		6:09

== Personnel ==
- Terence Blanchard – trumpet, main performer
- Jeanie Bryson – vocals
- Bruce Barth – piano
- Chris Thomas – bass
- Troy Davis – drums

== Chart performance ==
Chart (1994)	Peak position
US Traditional Jazz Albums (Billboard)	3
Billboard 200	14
