= Let Go (Robert Glasper album) =

Studio album by Robert Glasper
- Released: June 7, 2024
- Recorded: 2024
- Genre: jazz
- Length: 58:58
- Label: Loma Vista
- Producer: Robert Glasper

Robert Glasper chronology
Black Radio III (2022)	Let Go (2024)	Code Derivation (2025)

Let Go is a studio album by American musician Robert Glasper. The album was released on June 7, 2024, via Loma Vista Recordings.

== Background ==
The record was initially released in an exclusive streaming partnership coinciding with Apple Music's Black Music Month. The band features Meshell Ndegeocello, with Kendrick Scott on drums, Burniss Travis on bass, and Chris Sholar on guitar.

Glasper explained: "My whole career, everybody’s been saying my music is meditative. People say they study to my music, pray to my music, do yoga to my music; they just zone out. People have wanted me to do this for a long time. I wouldn’t call it the ‘meditation project’ or nothing like that, but it’s something you can put on that helps you find your center. It’s just something that quiets the world and allows you to see what’s within."

== Reception ==
Jeroen van der Vring of Heaven stated: "Don't expect an album full of pronounced jazz grooves or soul in capital letters — Let Go is a meditative, introspective work with a calm, almost ambient-like atmosphere. So thirteen compositions with plenty of room for atmosphere, peace and inner reflection. Glasper's twelfth album is meant to be a kind of mental reset music for meditating or just relaxing." Dinesh Mattu of the The Line of Best Fit wrote: "Taking a more meditative approach, Let Go is a soothing, almost spiritual collection designed for moments of focus and calm."

== Track listing ==
All tracks are written by Robert Glasper except where noted.

No.	Title	Writer(s)	Length
1.	"Breathing Underwater (feat. Meshell Ndegeocello)"		2:14
2.	"Your Eyes"		4:11
3.	"Let Go"		4:03
4.	"Inner Voices"	Robert Glasper, Chris Sholar	3:29
5.	"Round 'Bout Sunlight"	Burniss Travis	2:20
6.	"Going Home"		4:17
7.	"That One Morning"		3:11
8.	"Awakening Dawn"	Kendrick Scott	3:34
9.	"Luna's Lullaby (feat. Burniss Travis)"	Robert Glasper, Burniss Travis	4:01
10.	"Deep Down"		3:07
11.	"Enoch's Meditation"		8:13
12.	"I Am"		5:46
13.	"Truth Journey"	Robert Glasper, Burniss Travis	10:26
Total length:			58:58

== Personnel ==
- Robert Glasper – keyboards, producing, composing
- Ben Willams – guitar (bass)
- Burniss Travis – flute, guitar (bass)
- Chris Sholar – guitar, lyrics, vocals
- Ian Davis – spoken word
- Jahi Lake – DJ
- Justin Tyson – drum set
- Kendrick Scott – drum set, composing
- Meshell Ndegeocello – vocals
