= María Grand =

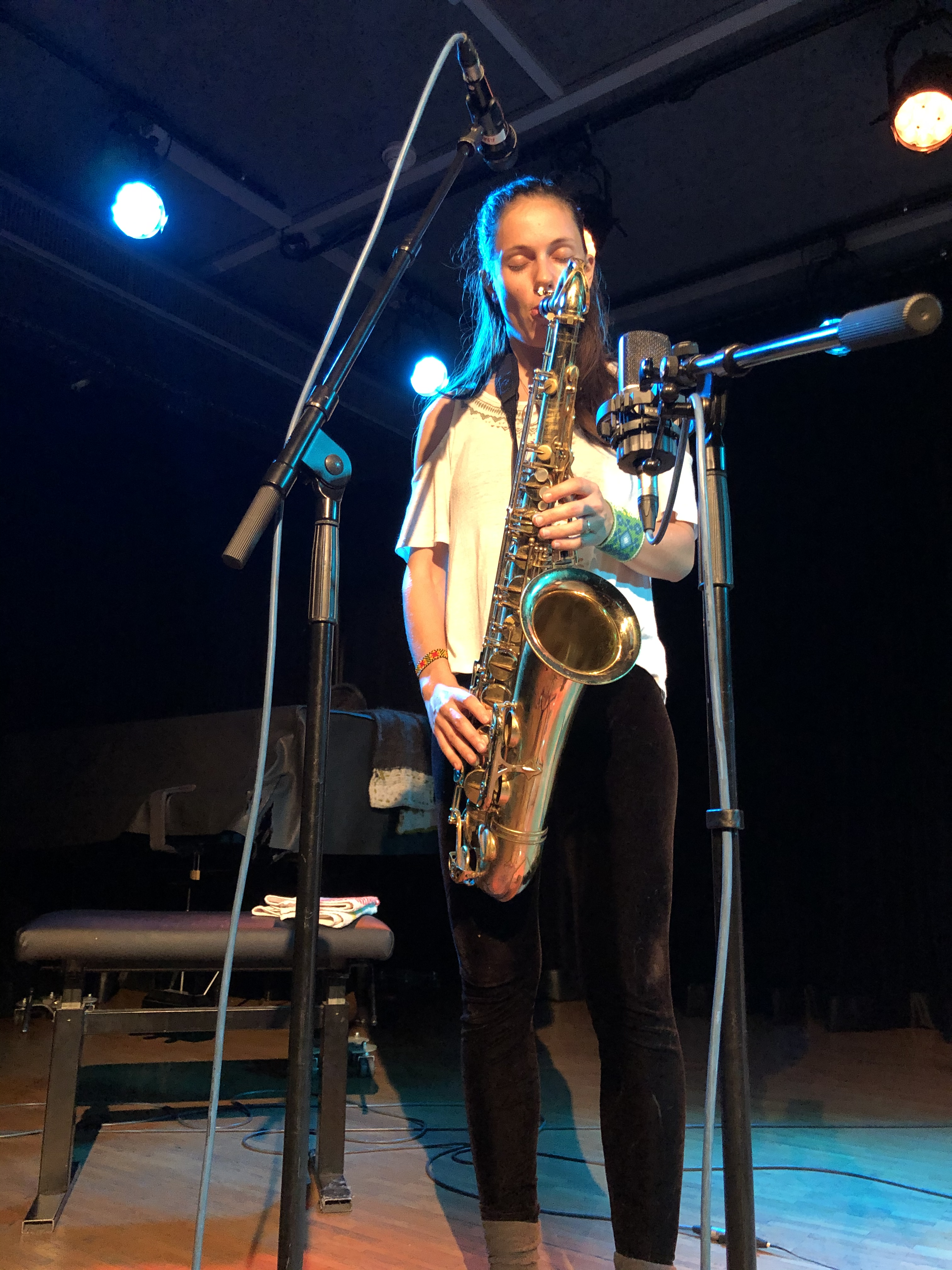
- Grand in concert at AMR, 2019

Background information
- Born: 1992 (age 33–34); Switzerland
- Genres: Jazz; R&B; pop rock
- Occupations: Musician, composer, bandleader, visual artist, educator
- Instruments: Tenor saxophone, vocals
- Years active: 2011–present
- Labels: Biophilia
- Website: mariakimgrand.com

María Kim Grand (born 1992, Switzerland) is a tenor saxophonist, recording artist, bandleader, vocalist, composer, visual artist, and educator. She has been based in New York City since 2011.

Grand has performed with musicians such as Vijay Iyer, Steve Coleman, Greg Fox, Craig Taborn, Steve Lehman, Mary Halvorson, Doug Hammond, Jen Shyu, Rajna Swaminathan, Nicole Mitchell, Tamara Renée, Aaron Parks, Fay Victor, and others. She leads the ensemble DiaTribe. She has toured Europe, the United States, and South America, as both a leader and ensemble member, playing in clubs and concert halls, and at festivals.

== Recordings ==
Her debut EP, TetraWind, was released in 2017 on the Biophilia label, and featured accompaniment by Román Filiú, Rashaan Carter, David Bryant, and Craig Weinrib. NYC Jazz Record selected the EP as “one of the 2017’s best debuts."

Her first full-length album, Magdalena, was issued in 2018 on Biophilia. Along with Carter and Bryant, the album's ensemble included Jasmine Wilson, Amani Fela, Mary Halvorson, Fabian Almazan, and Jeremy Dutton. The album was hailed in Billboard as one of "The 10 Best Jazz Albums of 2018: Critic's Picks."

In 2019 she recorded in a quartet setting as part of drummer Devin Gray’s Algorhythmica. In 2021, she issued Reciprocity (Biophilia Records), a trio setting with Kanoa Mendenhall on bass and Savannah Harris on drums.

== Honors ==
In 2017, Grand received a 2017 Jazz Gallery Residency Commission. In 2018 she was awarded a Roulette Jerome Foundation Commission, and in 2019 became an Artist-in-Residence at the Brooklyn club Roulette.

In 2018 Grand was voted Best New Artist for the 2018 Jazz Times Extended Critics Poll, and was nominated for the Jazz Journalist's Association Up-And-Coming Musician of the Year Award.

The New York Times described Grand as “an engrossing young tenor saxophonist with a zesty attack and a solid tonal range."
