= Adi Meyerson =

Israeli jazz bassist

Adi Meyerson עדי מיירסון
- Born: San Francisco, California, U.S.
- Origin: Jerusalem, Israel
- Genres: Jazz
- Occupations: Bassist; composer; educator
- Instrument: Double Bass
- Years active: 2016-present
- Member of: Dark Matter, Little Kruta
- Website: adimeyersonmusic.com

Adi Meyerson (Hebrew: עדי מיירסון) is an American-Israeli jazz bassist, composer, and educator.

She was born in San Francisco, California, but grew up in Jerusalem, Israel. Meyerson started playing the double bass after graduating from high school and moved to New York City in 2012. She graduated from The New School in 2014 and earned a Master of Music at the Manhattan School of Music in 2020.

Meyerson released her first album, Where We Stand and her sophomore album, I Want to Sing My Heart Out in Praise of Life, in 2018 and 2021 respectively. She released her third album, Punctiform, in 2025. She is the leader of Dark Matter, an acoustic quartet. She is an educator and teaches at the Jazz at Lincoln Center (JALC) and Jazz House Kids.

Meyerson has been praised by critics for her compositional skills and her stylistic versatility. She has synesthesia, a perceptual condition, which she incorporates into her compositions.

== Early life and education ==
Adi Meyerson was born in San Francisco, California. At the age of two, Meyerson and her family moved to Jerusalem. She started playing the electric bass guitar in high school at 14. After high school, Meyerson began playing the double bass. She attended a program run by the School of Jazz and Contemporary Music and the Center for Jazz Studies at the Israel Conservatory of Music at The New School, a private university in Greenwich Village, New York City.

In August 2012, Meyerson immigrated to New York City to attend The New School. She was instructed by Ron Carter, Reggie Workman, Bob Cranshaw, Miguel Zenón, Jim McNeely, and Dave Liebman, among others. Meyerson graduated from The New School in 2014 and received a Master of Music at the Manhattan School of Music.

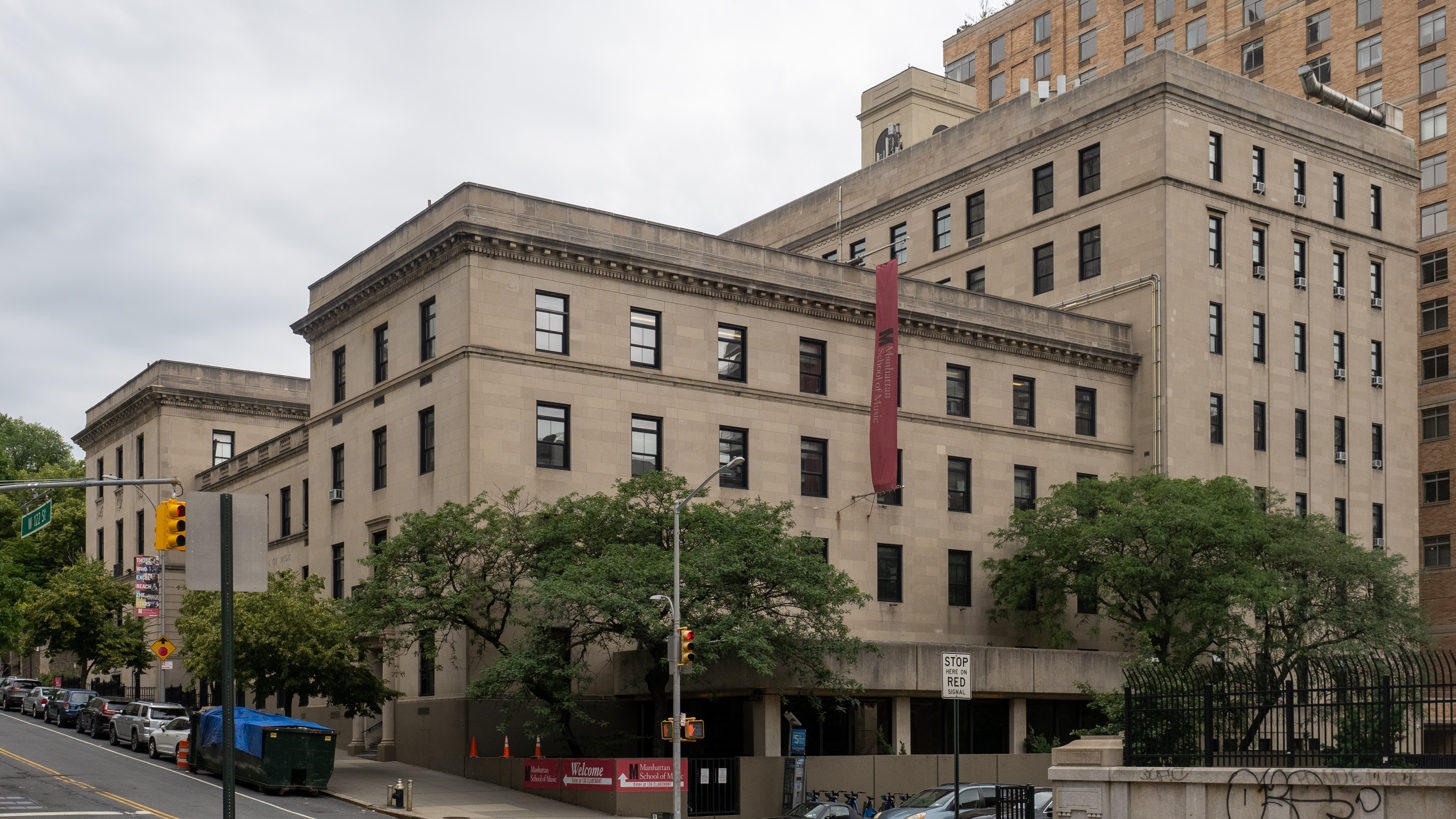
The Manhattan School of Music, 2021

== Career ==
Meyerson has performed at multiple jazz clubs including Smoke Jazz, Minton's, Smalls and Jazz Standard. She has played onstage with Joel Frahm, Charli Persip, and Champion Fulton. She recorded her first album, Where We Stand, in September 2017. She enlisted 5 musicians for the album, including saxophonist Joel Frahm and guitarist Camilla Meza. The album was released on June 5, 2018.

Meyerson was the bassist of Works For Me, a Posi-Tone musical collective, which released the studio album, Reach Within, on January 6, 2020. She wrote three of the songs on the album.

Meyerson started writing her sophomore album in February 2020 and had applied for New York Foundation for the Arts (NYFA) grant in October 2019 to finance the album. In 2020, she received money from the NYFA Women's Fund for the album. On August 6, 2021, she released I Want to Sing My Heart Out in Praise of Life.

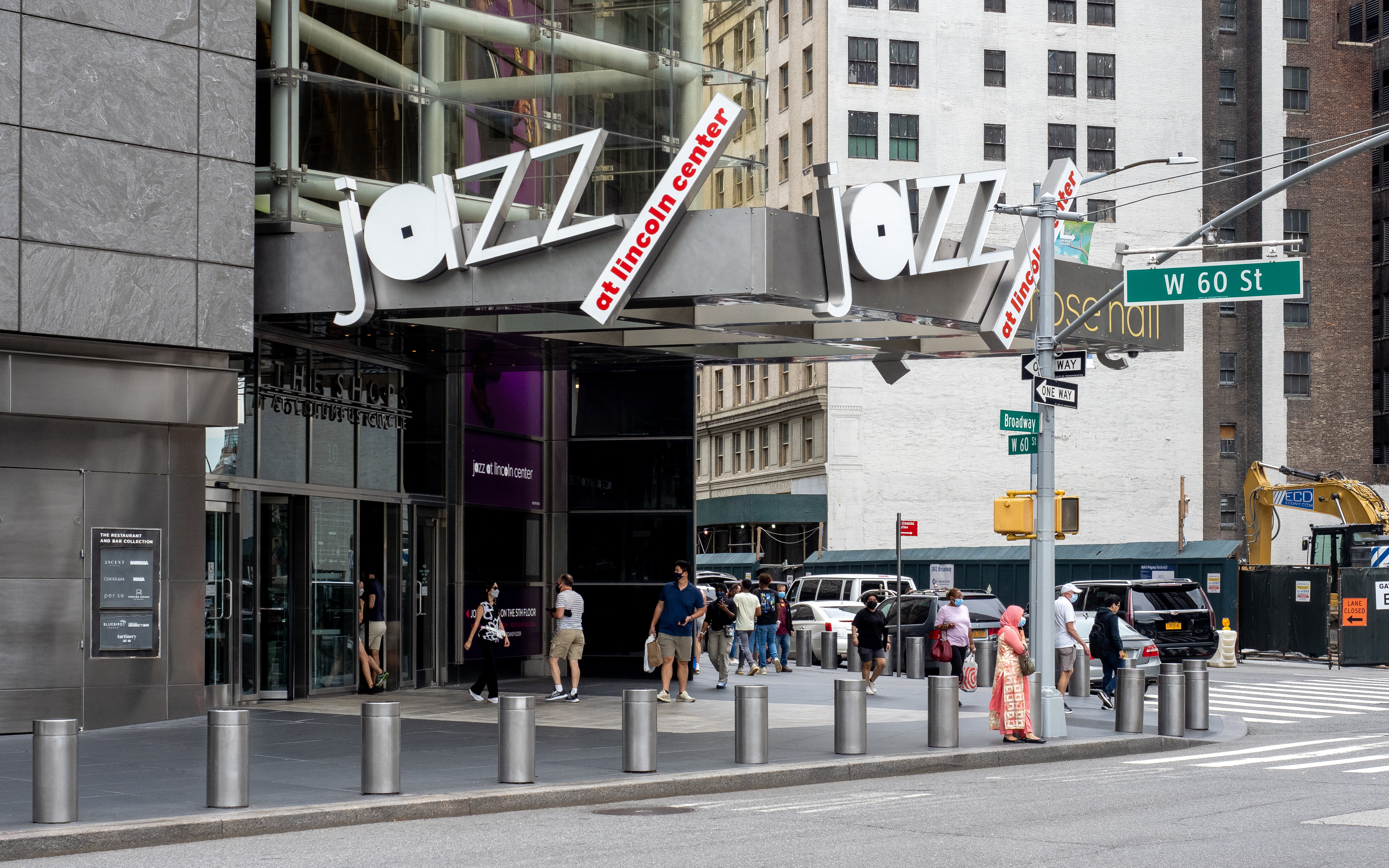
The Jazz at Lincoln Center, 2021

Meyerson is the leader of Dark Matter, an acoustic quartet. The quartet formed in 2022 and has performed throughout the United States. In 2024, the quartet was a recipient of Chamber Music America's Performance Plus Grant. The quartet recorded their first album in 2024, which is set to release in 2025. Meyerson teaches at the Jazz at Lincoln Center's Jazz for Young People program and at Jazz House Kids’ CHiCA Power Residency, a program that provides musical instruction for female musicians aged 12–18.

She released Punctiform, her third album and collaboration with steel tipped dove, on October 15, 2025.

== Style and influences ==
All About Jazz reviewer Jerome Wilson wrote that on Meyerson's debut album, "Most of the tracks have the feel of a hard-blowing '60s jazz combo", and that Meyerson "can compose strong, memorable tunes both in the mainstream jazz style and in more open, progressive formats." Tony Benjamin of Jazzwise noted that Meyerson's second album has "an upbeat and affirmative tone to her music, both in style and content."

In 2017, she attended an art exhibition by Yayoi Kusama, a Japanese visual artist. Kusama's work inspired her second album, I Want to Sing My Heart Out in Praise of Life. Meyerson says that the colors of Kusama's paintings were similar to the ones she experiences due to her synesthesia. Meyerson said, "I started using the pitch material, matching the colors to the notes." to compose the album.

During high school, Meyerson played rock and fusion on the bass guitar. Her influences include Sonny Rollins, Paul Chambers, Oscar Pettiford, Jimmy Blanton, Ahmad Jamal, Israel Crosby, Ron Carter, Charlie Haden, Jimmy Garrison, George Duvivier, and Charles Mingus. She listened to Sonny Rollins' albums Sonny Rollins Plus 4, Saxophone Colossus, and Tenor Madness heavily at age 17. Meyerson stated, "I wanted to start playing upright. I knew I couldn't get the bass to sound on electric like what I heard the bass sound like on those recordings."

Freddie Hendrix, who played trumpet on Where We Stand, said of Meyerson, "[She has] a good pen for composition as well as covering all of the bases as far as bass playing is concerned".

== Discography ==
=== As leader ===
- Where We Stand - (Self release, 2018)
- I Want to Sing My Heart Out in Praise of Life - (Self release, 2021)
- Punctiform - (Self release, 2025)

=== As member ===
==== With Little Kruta ====
- Little Kruta - One (Featuring Alita Moses) - (Chesky Records, 2019) Single - Recorded June 19, 2019
- Little Kruta - Justice - (Chesky Records, 2019) - Recorded June 19, 2019
- Little Kruta - Hero - Orchestral - (Atlantic Records, 2021)

=== As guest ===
==== With Pressure Fit ====
- Pressure Fit - Sticky - (2020, Youngbloods)
- Reginald Chapman & Pressure Fit - East Williamsburg Sessions - (2022, Fresh Selects)

==== With Works For Me ====
- Works For Me - Reach Within - (Posi-Tone, 2020)
- Works For Me - Send One Your Love - (2020, Posi-Tone) from Tales Of Wonder - A Jazz Celebration Of Stevie - Recorded June 6, 2019

==== With others ====
- Shannon Söderlund - The Magic - (2016, Independent)
- Champian Fulton - Speechless - (Posi-Tone, 2017)
- Stro Elliot - You Go To My Head - (Fresh Selects, 2020) from Prototype Remixes
- Fielded - Demisexual Lovelace - (2020, BackwoodsStudioz)
- New Faces - New Sounds - (Posi-Tone, 2021)
- Jeff Krol - Live at Scholes Street - (Independent, 2022)
- Vivienne Aerts - Typuhthâng - (2023, Independent)
- Willie Morris - Conversation Starter - (Posi-Tone, 2023)
- Posi-Tone - Shorter Moments - Citizen Wayne - (2023, Posi-Tone)
- Armand Hammer - We Buy Diabetic Test Strips - (Fat Possum Records, 2023)
- Midnight Sons - Money Has No Owners - (Chong Wizard Records, 2024)
