= Breathless (Terence Blanchard album) =

Studio album by Terence Blanchard
- Released: May 26, 2015
- Studios: Esplanade Recording Studios, New Orleans
- Genre: Jazz
- Length: 1:17:57
- Label: Blue Note 0602547269393
- Producers: Robin Burgess, Terence Blanchard

Terence Blanchard chronology
Magnetic (2013)	Breathless (2015)	Live (2018)

Singles from Breathless
- 1. "Soldiers" Released: April 21, 2015

Professional ratings
Review scores
Source	Rating
AllMusic	3.5/5 stars
The Guardian	3/5 stars
The Irish Times	3/5 stars
Jazz Forum	3/5 stars
Jazzwise	2/5 stars
Tom Hull	B+

Breathless is a studio album by American jazz trumpeter Terence Blanchard. The album was released on May 26, 2015 by Blue Note Records. The record also produced one single, "Soldiers".

== Background ==
Breathless features Blanchard's new band, The E-Collective, consisting of Fabian Almazan on keyboards, Charles Altura on guitar, Donald Ramsey on bass, and Oscar Seaton on drums. The album also features Maroon 5's PJ Morton on three cuts, and JRei Oliver, Terence's son, on spoken word. Blanchard explained that he and drummer Oscar Seaton, with whom he has recorded several film scores, had been talking about an album like this for years before they finally found time to record it. Like his previous album A Tale of God's Will, this record is also a thematic album inspired by tragedy. The album title serves as a reminder of the last words said by black New Yorker Eric Garner (“I can’t breathe”) in a chokehold by a NYPD officer and explores the effects of racism and the aftermath of its devastation on societies around the world. Breathless was nominated for 2016 Grammy Award for Best Jazz Instrumental Album.

== Reception ==
Bill Beuttler of JazzTimes wrote "Blanchard’s trumpet, of course, provides scorching firepower atop the band’s assortment of infectious grooves. It may not be jazz as we know it, but it’s soulful, sophisticated and worth meeting on its own terms. And it’s good that Blanchard finally got around to it." Cormac Larkin of The Irish Times commented "The spirit of Miles Davis would be hard for any American trumpeter in this genre to avoid, and there are certainly echoes of electric Miles, but perhaps also – intentionally or not – there is something more European here, reminiscent of Nils Petter Molvaer’s “future-jazz”, with the austere Nordic grooves replaced by the heat and flawless poise of some old-school jazz-funk". John Fordham of The Guardian noted "It’s an uneven set, and maybe too generically funky for some jazzers, but certainly has its thrilling moments". Matt Collar of AllMusic noted "Ultimately, while Breathless is a break from the aggressive, acoustic swing that has marked much of Blanchard's career, it nonetheless retains all the jaw-dropping artistry and soulful creativity we have come to expect, albeit delivered in a vibrant, electric style". In his review for The Buffalo News, Jeff Simon commented, "The groove on this disc is a bore as often as not... As for consumers of groove music and hip-hop, there’s some decent jazz soloing here but nothing you can’t hear in vastly more impressive circumstances elsewhere."

== Track listing ==
No.	Title	Writer(s)	Length
1.	"Compared to What" (Featuring PJ Morton)	Gene McDaniels	5:48
2.	"See Me As I Am"	Blanchard	8:52
3.	"Everglades"	Almazan	14:33
4.	"Breathless"	Blanchard	4:38
5.	"Confident Selflessness"	Blanchard	8:13
6.	"Shutting Down" (Featuring JRei Oliver, PJ Morton)	JRei Oliver	4:12
7.	"Soldiers"	Blanchard	6:08
8.	"Samadhi" (Spoken words – JRei Oliver)	Blanchard	3:56
9.	"Talk to Me" (Featuring Dr. Cornel West)	Blanchard	4:04
10.	"Tom & Jerry"	Blanchard	2:48
11.	"I Ain't Got Nothin' but Time" (Featuring PJ Morton)	Hank Williams	4:28
12.	"Cosmic Warrior"	Blanchard	5:24
13.	"Midnight"	Guy Berryman, Jonny Buckland, Will Champion, Chris Martin	4:53
Total length:			1:17:57

== Personnel ==
The E-Collective

- Terence Blanchard – trumpet, producer, writer (tracks: 2 4 5 7 8 9 10 12)
- Donald Ramsey – bass
- Oscar Seaton – drums
- Charles Altura – guitar
- Fabian Almazan – piano, synth

Production

- Don Was – A&R
- Steve Cook – A&R, administration
- Randall Leddy – art direction, design
- Andrew F. Scott - cover art
- Casey Contreary – assistant engineer
- Frank Wolf – engineer, mixing
- Don Was – executive producer
- Gavin Lurssen – mastering
- Henry Adebonojo – photography
- Robin Burgess – producer
- Tondrae Kemp – tour manager

== Chart performance ==
Chart (2015)	Peak position
US Traditional Jazz Albums (Billboard)	7
Billboard 200	12
