= Romantic Defiance =

Studio album by Terence Blanchard
- Released: May 30, 1995
- Recorded: December 12 13 15, 1994
- Studios: The Manhattan Center Ballroom, New York.
- Genre: Jazz
- Length: 51:44
- Label: Columbia 480489 2

Terence Blanchard chronology
In My Solitude: The Billie Holiday Songbook (1994)	Romantic Defiance (1995)	The Heart Speaks (1996)

Romantic Defiance is a studio album by American jazz trumpeter Terence Blanchard. The album was released on May 30, 1995, via Columbia and contains eight original lyrical compositions written by Blanchard.

== Critical reception ==
Professional ratings
Review scores
Source	Rating
AllMusic	4/5 stars
The Encyclopedia of Popular Music	4/5 stars
The Penguin Guide to Jazz	4/4 stars

Peter Watrous of The New York Times wrote that "the composition, full of bursts of melodies and winding ribbons of notes, was often overwhelmed by long improvisations. Mr. Blanchard's group is exceptionally aware of dynamics, and during the suite he and the band managed to impart, through long quiet sections, a real sense of tranquillity." A reviewer of Billboard stated, "Leading trumpeter Terence Blanchard's newest set is a strong, searching quintet date, featuring Kenny Garrett, who makes his tenor debut." Brian Morton and Richard Cook in The Penguin Jazz Guide: The History of the Music in the 1000 Best Albums called the album "wonderful".

== Track listing ==
All tracks are written by Terence Blanchard.

No.	Title	Length
1.	"The Premise"	6:18
2.	"Unconditional"	6:38
3.	"Betrayal of my Soul"	5:52
4.	"Devine Order"	8:58
5.	"Romantic Defiance"	8:53
6.	"Focus"	5:47
7.	"Romantic Processional"	1:41
8.	"Morning After Celebration"	7:37
Total length:		51:44

== Personnel ==
Band

- Terence Blanchard – trumpet, composer, producer
- Chris Thomas – bass
- Troy Davis – drums
- Edward Simon – piano
- Kenny Garrett – tenor saxophone

Production

- James P. Nichols – engineer
- Dr. George Producer – executive producer

== Chart performance ==
Chart (1995)	Peak position
US Traditional Jazz Albums (Billboard)	17
