= Fabian Almazan =

Cuban-American jazz pianist and composer

- Born: April 16, 1984 (age 42); Havana, Cuba
- Genres: Jazz
- Occupation: Musician
- Instrument: Piano
- Labels: Biophilia, Palmetto, ArtistShare
- Member of: The E-Collective
- Website: fabianalmazan.com

Fabian Almazan (born April 16, 1984) is a jazz pianist and composer born in Havana, Cuba, and raised in Miami, Florida.

== Biography ==
In addition to being a solo artist, Almazan is the founder and director of Biophilia Records and has held the piano chair in Jazz Trumpeter Terence Blanchard's band since 2007. Fabian Almazan began studying classical piano at an early age in his homeland, Havana. Having fled Cuba in political exile to Miami, Florida, his parents could not afford private piano lessons. Pianist Conchita Betancourt graciously taught Almazan free of charge for over three years, allowing him to audition for the New World School of the Arts in Miami, Florida where he studied from 1998 to 2002.

In 2002, Almazan was selected for the piano chair in the National Grammy High School Jazz Combo. Almazan later went on to win the piano chair for the Brubeck Institute fellowship program based in northern California where he studied with Mark Levine and performed with Dave Brubeck and Christian McBride. In 2003, Almazan moved to New York City, where he studied with Kenny Barron at the Manhattan School of Music. While pursuing his bachelor's degree, Almazan studied instrumentation and orchestration with Giampaolo Bracali. Under Bracali, Almazan composed pieces for orchestra and chamber ensembles. In 2009, Almazan received his master's degree from Manhattan School of Music, as a recipient of the Michael W. Greene Scholarship, studying privately with Jason Moran. Almazan received the Cintas Foundation 2010/11 Brandon Fradd Award in Music Composition. In 2011, Almazan was selected as one of six composers to participate in the Sundance Institute Composers' Lab, where he studied with such acclaimed film composers as George S. Clinton, Peter Golub, Harry Gregson-Williams, Ed Shearmur, Alan Silvestri, and Christopher Young. Since 2007, Almazan has toured extensively with the Terence Blanchard Quintet, of which he is a current member. Almazan is said to be "one of the great young talents of his generation” by Blanchard. Almazan has also performed alongside esteemed artists such as Gretchen Parlato, Paquito D'Rivera, Christian Scott, Chris Dingman, David Sanchez, Stefon Harris, Kendrick Scott, and Ambrose Akinmusire, among others.

Personalities, Almazan's debut album as a leader, was released in October 2011 on Biophilia/Palmetto Records, and featured Linda Oh, Henry Cole, Meg Okura, Megan Gould, Karen Waltuch, and Noah Hoffeld. Almazan "demonstrates intuitive control over Latin jazz repertoire and feeling" and his music is referred to as "intense and crystalline", "multifaceted and intriguing", and full of "unexpected twists".

Almazan's album, Rhizome, released in the Spring of 2014, was the first project to be released on the joint label Blue Note/ArtistShare.

== Discography ==
=== As leader ===
- Personalities (Biophilia, 2011)
- Rhizome with Rhizome (AriststShare, 2014)
- SWR New Jazz Meeting 2015 (Jazzhaus, 2017)
- Alcanza (Biophilia, 2017)
- This Land Abounds with Life (Biophilia, 2019)

=== As sideman ===
With Terence Blanchard

- Choices (Concord Jazz, 2009)
- Red Tails (Sony, 2012)
- Magnetic (Blue Note, 2013)
- Breathless (Blue Note, 2015)
- Live (Blue Note, 2018)

With others

- Anthony Branker, Beauty Within (Origin, 2016)
- Oran Etkin, Timbalooloo: Wake Up Clarinet! (Timbalooloo, 2010)
- Maria Grand, Magdalena (Biophilia, 2018)
- Mark Guiliana, Jersey (Motema, 2017)
- Melissa Aldana, Echoes Of The Inner Prophet (Blue Note, 2024)
- Jim Snidero, Main Street (Savant, 2015)
- Linda May Han Oh, Initial Here (Greenleaf, 2012)
- Linda May Han Oh, Walk Against Wind (Biophilia, 2017)
- The Wee Trio, Wee + 3 (Bionic, 2016)

== Filmography ==
=== Composer ===
- 2010 First Match (short)
- 2011 The Recorder Exam (short)
- 2014 Reaching Home (short)
- 2014 Socks & Bonds (short)
- 2015 Understudies (TV Movie)
- 2015 The Sonnet Project (TV Series) (1 episode) - Sonnet #144
- 2015 Somewhere in the Waves
- 2016 Dots

=== Soundtrack ===
- 2008 Miracle at St. Anna (musician: piano)
- 2010 Just Wright(writer: "H.U.G.S")
- 2012 Red Tails (musician - uncredited)
- 2013 Treme Season 4 | Episode 2 (writer: "Pet Steps Sitters Theme Song")
- 2014 Black or White (musician: piano)
- 2015 Chi-Raq (musician: piano)

=== Actor ===
- 2010 Just Wright
- 2013 Treme Season 4 | Episode 2
