= The Malcolm X Jazz Suite =

Studio album by Terence Blanchard
- Released: April 20, 1993
- Recorded: December 10, 11, and 14, 1992
- Studios: BNG, New York
- Genre: Jazz
- Length: 1:08:52
- Label: Columbia 473676 2
- Producer: Terence Blanchard

Terence Blanchard chronology
Simply Stated (1992)	The Malcolm X Jazz Suite (1993)	In My Solitude: The Billie Holiday Songbook (1994)

The Malcolm X Jazz Suite is a studio album by American jazz trumpeter Terence Blanchard. The album was released on April 20, 1993, via Columbia.

== Background ==
Blanchard acted as the composer and orchestrator for Spike Lee's last two films: Jungle Fever and Malcolm X. Blanchard took the strongest themes from the latter movie and rearranged them for the present jazz quintet sessions. Bassist Tarus Mateen, tenor saxophonist Sam Newsome, pianist Bruce Barth, and drummer Troy Davis each also participated in the original Malcolm X project. In 1994, the album was nominated for Soul Train Music Award for Best Jazz Album.

== Critical reception ==
Professional ratings
Review scores
Source	Rating
AllMusic	4.5/5 stars
The Encyclopedia of Popular Music	3/5 stars
Entertainment Weekly	B
Los Angeles Times	2.5/4 stars
The Rolling Stone Jazz & Blues Album Guide	4/5 stars
The Virgin Encyclopedia of Jazz	3/5 stars

Scott Yanow of AllMusic stated, "Trumpeter Terence Blanchard continues to grow and develop with each year. He wrote the score for Malcolm X and this set finds him exploring 11 of his themes from the movie with his quintet... Many moods are explored and the fresh material really invigorates the quintet. Newsome's Trane-isms blend well with Blanchard (whose range has become quite impressive) and the performances (which easily stand apart from the film) are quite memorable. It's one of Terence Blachard's finest recordings." David Hajdu of Entertainment Weekly added, "Most important, like the rarest of movie music (including the classic jazz soundtracks by Eddie Sauter), The Malcolm X Jazz Suite looks fine without the movie". He further noted, "Adapted from his music for Spike Lee’s Malcolm X, this ambitious suite by young trumpeter Terence Blanchard evokes both X generations: Malcolm’s, by mimicking — I mean, paying homage to — the brooding, modal, small-band jazz that Miles Davis was making at the time of Malcolm’s rise; and Blanchard’s, by meandering along without much regard for structural tradition." Zan Stewart of the Los Angeles Times commented, "Do tunes taken from a movie score serve as a solid basis for a thematic quintet album? Not always, as trumpeter-composer Blanchard's latest project illustrates".

== Track listing ==
All tracks are written by Terence Blanchard.

No.	Title	Length
1.	"The Opening"	8:30
2.	"Melody for Laura"	6:26
3.	"Theme for Elijah"	5:24
4.	"Blues for Malcolm"	12:06
5.	"The Nation"	4:54
6.	"Malcolm's Theme"	6:07
7.	"Betty's Theme"	7:39
8.	"Malcolm Makes Hajj"	4:37
9.	"Malcolm at Peace"	11:22
10.	"Perpetuity"	4:30
11.	"Malcolm's Theme"	1:47
Total length:		1:08:52

== Personnel ==
- Bruce Barth – piano
- Terence Blanchard – composer, producer, trumpet
- Troy Davis – drums
- Tarus Mateen – bass
- Sam Newsome – sax (tenor)

Production

- Joel Zimmerman – art direction, design
- Robin Burgessco – producer
- James P. Nichols – engineer
- Dr. George Butler – executive producer
- Hans Neleman – photography

== Chart performance ==
Chart (1993)	Peak position
US Traditional Jazz Albums (Billboard)	23
