= The Heart Speaks =

Studio album by Terence Blanchard
- Released: February 6, 1996
- Recorded: August 28–31, 1995
- Studios: Conway Studios, Studio C, Hollywood, CA.
- Genre: Latin jazz
- Length: 1:04:09
- Label: Columbia CK 67415
- Producer: Miles Goodman

Terence Blanchard chronology
Romantic Defiance (1995)	The Heart Speaks (1996)	Jazz in Film (1999)

Professional ratings
Review scores
Source	Rating
AllMusic	4/5 stars
The Encyclopedia of Popular Music	3/5 stars
Los Angeles Times	3/4 stars
The Penguin Guide to Jazz	3.5/4 stars
The Rolling Stone Jazz & Blues Album Guide	4/5 stars

The Heart Speaks is a studio album by American jazz trumpeter Terence Blanchard. The album was released on February 6, 1996, via Columbia. On this record Blanchard joins with a team that includes Ivan Lins, Paulinho da Costa, and Oscar Castro-Neves. In 1997, the album was nominated for Grammy Award for Best Latin Jazz Album.

== Critical reception ==
Scott Yanow of AllMusic noted "Although trumpeter Terence Blanchard gets first billing on this recording, it is very much a joint effort with singer-composer Ivan Lins. Not only are all 13 songs by Lins but he sings on all but the three instrumentals although sometimes just wordlessly in the background. Blanchard often harmonizes with Lins' voice, creating a melancholy and dreamy atmosphere. Most selections feature Blanchard's regular rhythm section of the time, augmented by Paulinho Da Costa's percussion and occasionally Oscar Castro-Neves' acoustic guitar." A reviewer of All About Jazz commented "This album is for late, late night listening 'round midnight' and is guaranteed to soothe away the stress and strain of the day. This music will caress you like waves washing onto the shore on a summer's evening. If you like your contemporary jazz with more bounce to the ounce, "The Heart Speaks" is definitely not for you".

A reviewer of the Los Angeles Times stated "Blanchard has taken a particularly unusual route with "The Heart Speaks." It would not, in fact, have been inappropriate to list the album as a collaboration between the trumpeter and Brazilian singer-songwriter Ivan Lins. Every piece was written by Lins, and with the exception of the title tune and one other, he sings on every track. Further escalating the commercial risks of the project, Lins—unlike Astrud Gilberto, who sang in English on her early bossa nova recordings with Stan Getz—ings entirely in Portuguese. Despite the relative unfamiliarity of the material, the combination works surprisingly well. Blanchard's large, resonant tone provides a warm, lush contrast to Lins' gentle but emotionally penetrating vocal style. If there is a problem, it is in the occasionally clattering rhythm playing, which too often sounds ponderous and root-bound in comparison to the soaring eloquence of the dialogue between Lins and Blanchard."

== Track listing ==
No.	Title	Writer(s)	Length
1.	"Aparecida"	Ivan Lins	6:01
2.	"Antes Que Seja Tarde"	Ivan Lins, Vítor Martins	5:30
3.	"Meu Pais" (My Country)	Lins, Martins	3:57
4.	"Valsa Mineira"	Lins	4:53
5.	"The Heart Speaks"	Lins	5:28
6.	"Congada Blues"	Lins, Martins	5:36
7.	"Nocturna"	Lins, Martins	5:25
8.	"Just for Nana"	Lins	5:04
9.	"Orizimbo and Rosicler"	Lins, Martins	4:30
10.	"Chorus das Aguas"	Lins, Martins	7:28
11.	"Love Dance / Comecar de Novo"	Ivan Lins, Gilson Peranzzetta, Paul Williams	4:24
12.	"Menino"	Lins, Martins	4:49
13.	"Aparecida" (Reprise)	Lins	1:04
Total length:			1:04:09

Tracks 8 and 9 are dedicated to Nana Caymmi and Zimbo Trio.

== Personnel ==
- Terence Blanchard – trumpet
- Ivan Lins – vocals (1 2 3 4 6 8 9 11 12 13)
- David Bahanovich – cello
- Fred Zlotkin – cello (8 10)
- Oscar Castro-Neves – guitar (1 to 3, 9, 13)
- Edward Simon – piano
- David Pulphus – bass (except 11)
- Troy Davis – drums (except 8 11)
- Paulinho Da Costa – percussion (1 2 3 4 6 9 12 13)
