= A Tale of God's Will (A Requiem for Katrina) =

Studio album by Terence Blanchard
- Released: August 14, 2007
- Studios: Conway Recording Studios, Los Angeles, California; Bastyr University, Kenmore, Washington
- Genre: Jazz
- Length: 69:13
- Label: Blue Note
- Producer: Terence Blanchard

Terence Blanchard chronology
Flow (2005)	A Tale of God's Will (A Requiem for Katrina) (2007)	Choices (2009)

Professional ratings
Review scores
Source	Rating
All About Jazz	4/5 stars
AllMusic	4.5/5 stars
Entertainment Weekly	A−
Jazzwise	3/5 stars
The Penguin Guide to Jazz Recordings	3.5/4 stars
PopMatters	9/10 stars
Sputnikmusic	3.8/5
Tom Hull	B+

A Tale of God's Will (A Requiem for Katrina) is a studio album recorded in 2007 by the Terence Blanchard Quintet. The album was originally released on August 14, 2007 by Blue Note Records.

In 2008, Blanchard won a Grammy Award for Best Large Jazz Ensemble Album, and was nominated for Best Jazz Instrument Solo for his work on the song "Levees". Also, JazzTimes included the album in its "Jazz Albums with Strings" list, ranking it #6.

== Background ==
Film director Spike Lee commissioned New Orleans native Terence Blanchard to compose the score for his 2006 four-hour HBO documentary When the Levees Broke: A Requiem in Four Acts, to show the agony of the aftermath of Hurricane Katrina in 2005. In 2007, Blanchard recorded A Tale of God's Will, which contains parts ("The Water", "Levees", "Wading Through", and "Funeral Dirge") of the recording that were heard in Lee's documentary. Blanchard's mother, Wilhelmina, lost her Pontchartrain Park home in the tragedy but survived.

In his interview for Socialist Review Blanchard explained, "I drew inspiration from the stories people had told me about their experiences in the aftermath of the hurricane. It wasn't so much about music for me. It was really more about what people had to endure. I just want people to reflect on what happened here and what people had to deal with, and how things can go terribly wrong in what is supposed to be the richest country in the world."

== Reception ==
Will Layman of PopMatters awarded the album nine points out of 10, stating "Taken as a whole, two elements of this recording stand out. First, Blanchard and his group play selflessly, without reaching for flashy effects or long solos. Everything about this record is about bringing the compositions to full fruition, and the improvisation always sounds integrated with the full purpose of the music. Second, every element of the record is incorporated into its theme. Even the tracks that are somewhat disparate (a swinging duet between bass and trumpet on "Ghost of Betsy" and a fragmentary tenor solo on "Ghost of 1927", particularly) play as interludes that breathe life into the project between larger movements." Larry Blumenfeld of Entertainment Weekly commented "Accompanied by an orchestra, Blanchard’s quintet moves elegantly from African rhythms to modern swing to balladic repose, his horn’s curled pleas and soaring declarations channeling both pain and resilience. It’s the Katrina story CNN can’t tell, masterfully told". John Swenson of OffBeat added "A Tale of God’s Will is an expansion of the music Blanchard and his band made for the Lee documentary, and it moves with the epic scope of the flood itself".

A reviewer of Reuters noted "What started as a gig scoring Spike Lee’s HBO documentary “When the Levees Broke” has been imaginatively expanded by trumpeter Terence Blanchard into this epic-length, orchestral-string masterwork. As the second anniversary of the New Orleans deluge approaches, the Crescent City native delivers his compelling and poignant reflections on the catastrophe, with the support of his quintet and the 40-piece Northwest Sinfonia. In the tunes, there is anger and angst, lush melody and woeful wails, pockets of grace and flood waters of melancholy. Four “Levees” numbers are in the mix, with revitalized arrangements, including the prodding, ominous “The Water” and the painfully anguished “Funeral Dirge.” Of particular note are three impromptu short “ghost” pieces, as well as originals by Blanchard’s band members, highlighted by pianist Aaron Park’s lyrical gem “Ashe” and saxophonist Brice Winston’s heart-rending “In Time of Need.” Chris May of All About Jazz wrote "Blanchard's no-frills, in-the-tradition, testifying trumpet, which is the main solo voice, rings out powerfully and affectingly throughout. He blows like a blues player sings, by turns angry, plaintive, stoic, hopeful and elegiac—and, almost tangibly, always from the heart". Josh Jackson of NPR observed, "this recording reveals what many jazz fans know: Blanchard is a powerful storyteller."

== Track listing ==
All tracks are written by Terence Blanchard except where noted.

No.	Title	Length
1.	"Ghost of Congo Square" (Blanchard, Hodge, Scott)	3:01
2.	"Levees"	8:07
3.	"Wading Through"	6:27
4.	"Ashé" (Aaron Parks)	8:18
5.	"In Time of Need" (Brice Winston)	7:53
6.	"Ghost of Betsy"	1:58
7.	"The Water"	4:07
8.	"Mantra Intro" (Kendrick Scott)	3:22
9.	"Mantra" (Kendrick Scott)	9:49
10.	"Over There" (Derrick Hodge)	7:43
11.	"Ghost of 1927"	1:38
12.	"Funeral Dirge"	5:51
13.	"Dear Mom"	3:39
Total length:		69:13

== Personnel ==
Band

- Terence Blanchard – conductor, trumpet, orchestration, producer, liner notes,
- Brice Winston – soprano sax, tenor sax, liner notes
- Derrick Hodge – double bass, bass guitar, liner notes
- Aaron Parks – piano, orchestration, liner notes,
- Kendrick Scott – drums, percussion, orchestration
- Zach Harmon – tabla and happy apple

Production

- Howard Drossin – orchestration
- Robin Burgess – associate producer
- Brian Valentino – engineer
- Frank Wolf – engineer
- Seth Waldman – assistant engineer
- Gavin Lurssen – mastering
- Lolis Eric Elie – liner notes

== Chart performance ==
Chart (2007)	Peak position
US Traditional Jazz Albums (Billboard)	6
Billboard 200	8
