= Wandering Moon =

Studio album by Terence Blanchard
- Released: February 15, 2000
- Recorded: June 15–17, 1999
- Studios: Clinton Recording Studios, Studio A, New York City.
- Genre: Jazz
- Length: 75:08
- Label: Sony Classical
- Producer: Terence Blanchard

Terence Blanchard chronology
Jazz in Film (1999)	Wandering Moon (2000)	Let's Get Lost (2001)

Wandering Moon is a studio album by American trumpeter Terence Blanchard. The album was released on February 15, 2000, via Sony Classical label. Blanchard wrote most of the compositions for the record, except for pianist Edward Simon’s waltz "The Process" and jazz standard "I Thought About You". For the latter song, the album was nominated in 2000 for Grammy Award for Best Jazz Instrumental Solo.

== Critical reception ==
Professional ratings
Review scores
Source	Rating
AllMusic	4.5/5 stars
The Austin Chronicle	3/5 stars
Entertainment Weekly	B+
The Penguin Guide to Jazz	4/4 stars

Willard Jenkins of Jazz Times stated "Anyone expecting Terence Blanchard to rest on his laurels, comfortably ensconced in the lucrative world of motion picture scoring, better think again. Though his abiding interest in film scoring is evidenced by his continuing ascension to the A list of the genre, and his beautifully crafted journey through a program of film classics on last year’s superior Sony record was clear evidence of his immersion in that world, Blanchard remains a jazz trumpeter, bandleader and composer to his core. All three attributes are in stout form on this latest date for Sony Classical... There is a handsome, dusky quality to this date, rather like a rich black coffee or that mahogany table you’ve been coveting, as Blanchard explores a fine palette of moods and colors, with one contribution from Simon, the intrepid “The Process,” and the evergreen “I Thought About You.” The rest is pure Blanchard."

Lee Prosse of Jazz Review mentioned "Jazz trumpeter Terence Blanchard has quite the resume: he played in Art Blakey's Jazz Messengers in the 1980s and composed the music for some of director Spike Lee's films... On MOON, he's joined by a couple of notable vets—saxophonist Branford Marsalis and acoustic bassist Dave Holland (no stranger to these electro-pages & he's played with everyone from Anthony Braxton to Bonnie Raitt) and some names new to me: ace sax-fellows Brice Winston & Aaron Fletcher. Pianist Edward Simon plays with sweet lyricism as well as vigor, and Eric Harland is a stunningly dynamic drummer in the multi-rhythmic Blakey mold. Hey Wynton, dig this!"

Michael G. Nastos of AllMusic wrote "Trumpeter Blanchard has released some fine recordings in the '90s, but this one may be the best of them all, as he asserts himself as a composer of truly original modern jazz. He wrote seven selections, utilizing one or two of three saxophonists per cut—Branford Marsalis and Brice Winston (tenor) or Aaron Fletcher (alto). It's the rhythm section that boils this pot over; bassist David Holland and especially pianist Edward Simon are en fuego, while young drummer Eric Harland continues to show steady progress en route to becoming a first-rate trappist... Sparks fly, and unrequited moods coalesce during this prismatic epic of emotions, swing, and truly new mainstream jazz from Blanchard and his cohorts. It comes highly recommended, and is a strong candidate for Jazz CD of Y2K."

== Track listing ==
No.	Title	Writer(s)	Length
1.	"Luna Viajera"	Terence Blanchard	7:50
2.	"If I Could, I Would"	Blanchard	9:19
3.	"Bass Solo"		1:10
4.	"My Only Thought of You"	Blanchard	6:55
5.	"Simplemente Simon"	Blanchard	8:26
6.	"Sweet's Dream"	Blanchard	7:24
7.	"Sidney"	Blanchard	6:45
8.	"The Process"	Edward Simon	7:26
9.	"Joe & O"	Blanchard	10:57
10.	"I Thought About You"	Jimmy Van Heusen, Johnny Mercer	8:59
Total length:			65:08

== Personnel ==
Band

- Terence Blanchard – trumpet, producer, liner notes
- Aaron Fletcher – alto saxophone
- Dave Holland – bass
- Eric Harland – drums
- Edward Simon – piano
- Branford Marsalis – tenor saxophone
- Brice Winston – tenor saxophone

Production

- Giulio Turturro – art direction
- Jim Anderson – engineer
- Laraine Perri – executive producer
- Jimmy Katz – photography
- Robin Burgess – associate producer
