= Let's Get Lost (album) =

Studio album by Terence Blanchard
- Released: May 22, 2001
- Recorded: January 16 – February 27, 2001
- Genre: Jazz
- Length: 64:05
- Label: Sony Classical
- Producer: Terence Blanchard

Terence Blanchard chronology
Wandering Moon (2000)	Let's Get Lost (2001)	Bounce (2003)

Professional ratings
Review scores
Source	Rating
AllMusic	2/5 stars
The Penguin Guide to Jazz	3.5/4 stars
Tom Hull	B+

Let's Get Lost is a 2001 studio album by Grammy winning jazz trumpeter Terence Blanchard, recorded with four well-known female vocalists: Diana Krall, Jane Monheit, Dianne Reeves, and Cassandra Wilson. The album is a collection of Jimmy McHugh's songs.

== Recognition ==
The instrumental track "Lost in a Fog" was nominated for a Grammy in 2001 for "Best Jazz Instrumental Solo," which showcases what Blanchard is admired for the most—his ability to meld together lush, emotionally evocative melodies.

== Critical reception ==
Ben Ratlif of The New York Times stated "Terence Blanchard's new album, Let's Get Lost, just released by Sony Classics, is an example of jazz marketing at its most finely calibrated. It is a concept album, which is de rigueur if the plan is to sell more than few thousand copies. It is an album of musical-theater songs, which expands the base of jazz-record buyers. It is an underdog-championing album: the songs are by Jimmy McHugh, whom many consider the great overlooked songwriter of prewar show tunes. To sing the songs, it recruits the four most popular jazz singers of the moment: Diana Krall, Cassandra Wilson, Dianne Reeves and Jane Monheit. It's a perfect box of chocolates, not just in marketing but also in music..."

Christopher John Farley of TIME wrote "On this supremely satisfying CD, trumpeter Terence Blanchard, with the help of four jazz divas, pays tribute to the music of songwriting great Jimmy McHugh. Diana Krall whisks in like winter, offering a chilly, elegant take on the title song; newcomer Jane Monheit is spring, with a dewy rendition of Too Young to Go Steady; Dianne Reeves' summery I Can't Believe That You're in Love with Me offers gentle warmth; and Cassandra Wilson's autumnal Sunny Side of the Street is laden with loss but colored with beautiful hues. Blanchard blows his way through these songs with charming, restrained invention..."

A reviewer of All About Jazz mentioned "As a follow-up to his previous album, Wandering Moon, Terence Blanchard has chosen to de-emphasize his compositional skills and to honor the often-overlooked popular songs written by Jimmy McHugh. That would be a fine project for a jazz musician were he or she to reinterpret the tunes, and some of that does occur on Let's Get Lost. However, many of its arrangements are straightforward, perhaps with the underlying addition of bass lines to elevate the tunes, as pianist Edward Simon and bassist Derek Nievergelt do so well on "Let's Get Lost" and "I Can't Give You Anything But Love."

== Track listing ==
Track	Song Title	Vocals	Composer	Time
1.	Let's Get Lost	Diana Krall	McHugh/Loesser	5:11
2.	Too Young to Go Steady	Jane Monheit	McHugh/Adamson	7:06
3.	You're a Sweetheart		McHugh/Adamson	6:44
4.	I Can't Believe That You're in Love With Me	Dianne Reeves	McHugh/Gaskill	5:46
5.	I'm in the Mood for Love		McHugh/Fields	5:39
6.	Don't Blame Me	Cassandra Wilson	McHugh/Fields	5:22
7.	I Can't Give You Anything But Love	Jane Monheit	McHugh/Fields	5:20
8.	Exactly Like You		McHugh/Fields	5:05
9.	Can't Get Out of This Mood	Dianne Reeves	McHugh/Loesser	3:58
10.	Lost in a Fog		McHugh/Fields	9:10
11.	On the Sunny Side of the Street	Cassandra Wilson	McHugh/Fields	4:44

== Personnel ==
- Terence Blanchard – trumpet
- Diana Krall – vocals, piano
- Jane Monheit – vocals
- Dianne Reeves – vocals
- Cassandra Wilson – vocals
- Brice Winston – tenor saxophone
- Edward Simon – piano
- Derek Nievergelt – bass
- Eric Harland – drums

== Chart performance ==
Chart (2001)	Peak position
US Traditional Jazz Albums (Billboard)	3
Billboard 200	3
