= Terence Blanchard =

American trumpeter and composer (born 1962)

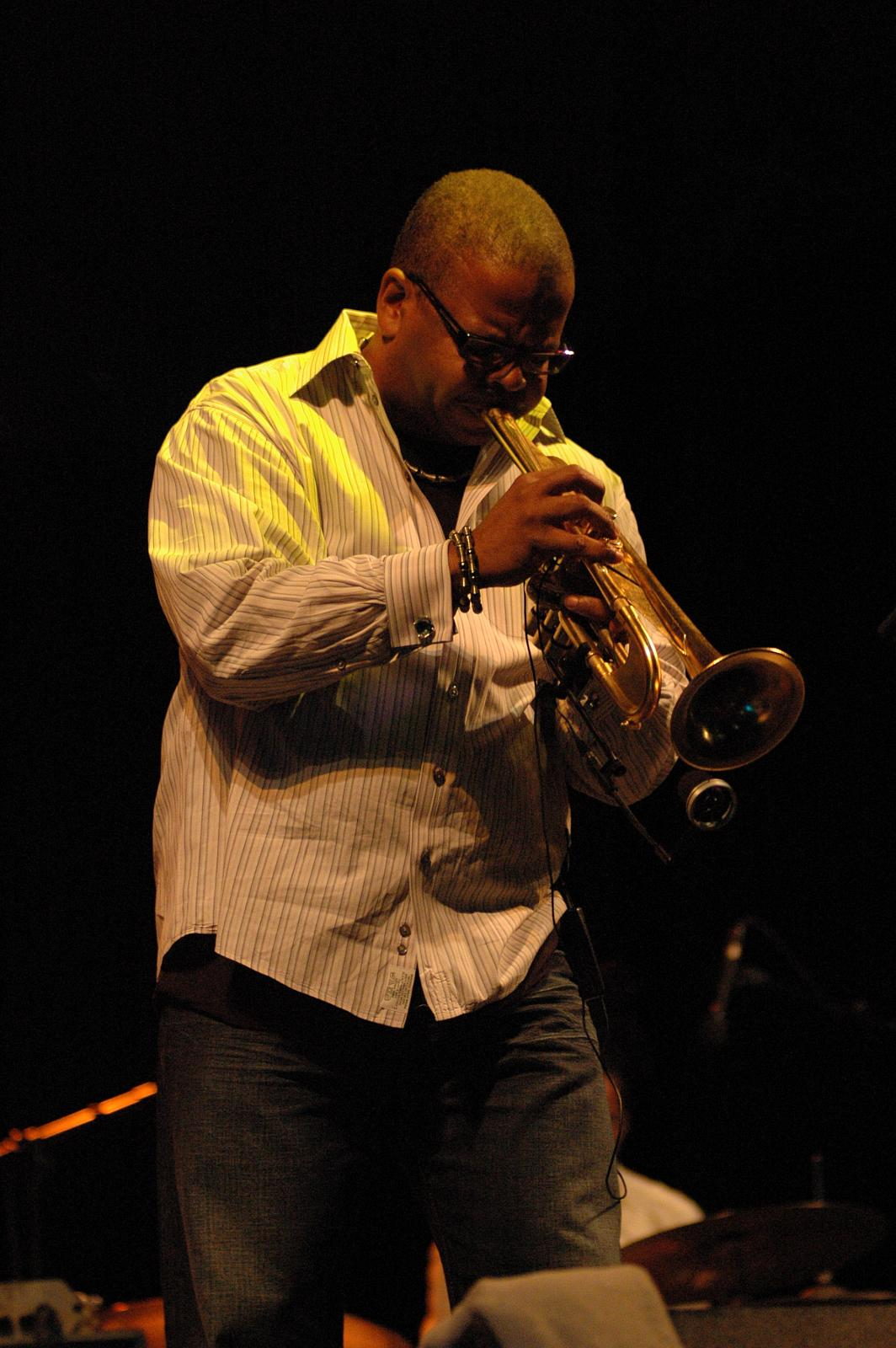
- Blanchard performing in July 2008

Background information
- Born: Terence Oliver Blanchard; March 13, 1962 (age 64); New Orleans, Louisiana, U.S.
- Genre: Jazz
- Occupations: Musician; composer; conductor; arranger; orchestrator
- Instruments: Trumpet; piano; keyboards
- Years active: 1980–present
- Labels: Blue Note; Sony Classical; Columbia
- Website: www.terenceblanchard.com

Terence Oliver Blanchard (born March 13, 1962) is an American jazz trumpeter and composer. He has also written two operas and more than 80 film and television scores. Blanchard has been nominated for two Academy Awards for Original Score for BlacKkKlansman (2018) and Da 5 Bloods (2020), both directed by Spike Lee, a frequent collaborator.

Blanchard started his career in 1980 playing in the Lionel Hampton Orchestra while studying jazz at Rutgers University. In 1982, just before he turned 20, he dropped out of Rutgers to join The Jazz Messengers, launching a professional career now in its fifth decade. The Metropolitan Opera in New York staged Blanchard's opera Fire Shut Up in My Bones in its 2021–2022 season, the first opera by an African American composer in the organization's history.

Blanchard is also a passionate educational mentor. From 2000 to 2011, Blanchard served as artistic director of the Thelonious Monk Institute of Jazz. In 2011, he was named artistic director of the Henry Mancini Institute at the University of Miami, and in 2015, he became a visiting scholar in jazz composition at the Berklee College of Music. In 2019, the University of California, Los Angeles (UCLA), named Blanchard to its Endowed Chair in Jazz Studies, where he remained until 2023. In 2023, SFJAZZ announced the appointment of Blanchard as Executive Artistic Director. He leads the organization's artistic programming and guides its overall creative direction.

Blanchard was selected as the 2024 National Endowment for the Arts Jazz Masters.

== Early life ==
Blanchard was born in New Orleans, Louisiana, the only child of Wilhelmina and Joseph Oliver Blanchard. His father was a manager at an insurance company and an amateur opera singer.

Blanchard began playing piano at the age of five, and then at age eight, he switched to the trumpet after hearing Alvin Alcorn perform at his school. Blanchard played trumpet in summer music camps alongside his childhood friends, Wynton Marsalis and Branford Marsalis.

Blanchard attended St. Augustine High School until transferring to John F. Kennedy High School so he could attend the prestigious New Orleans Center for Creative Arts where he studied under Roger Dickerson and Ellis Marsalis. From 1980 to 1982, Blanchard studied under jazz saxophonist Paul Jeffrey and trumpeter Bill Fielder at Rutgers University.

== Career ==
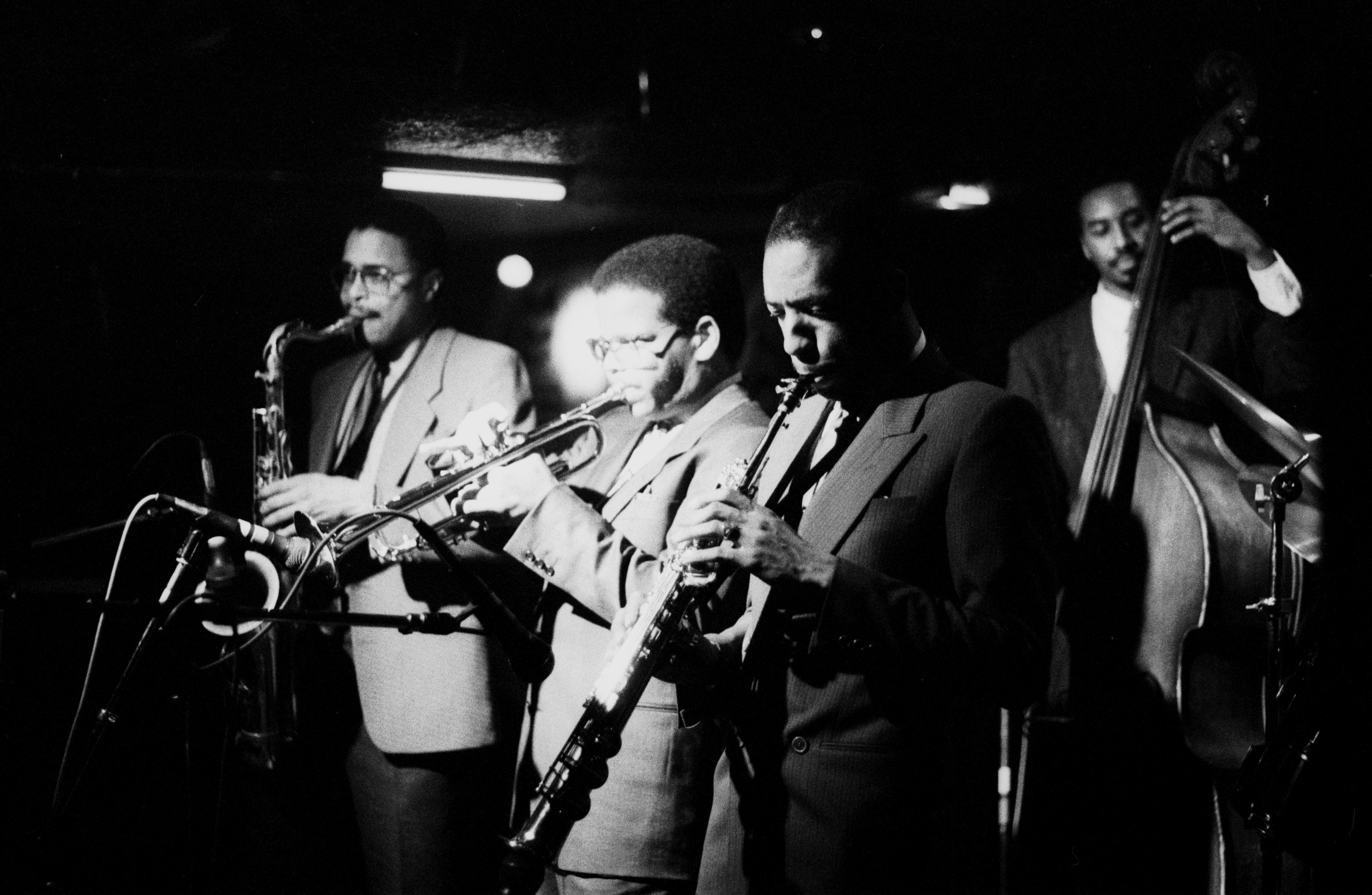
The Jazz Messengers of 1985, from left: Jean Toussaint, Terence Blanchard, Donald Harrison, and Lonnie Plaxico

While at Rutgers University, Blanchard began touring with the Lionel Hampton Orchestra. In 1982, Wynton Marsalis recommended Blanchard as his replacement in Art Blakey's Jazz Messengers and Blakey would appoint Blanchard the band's musical director. Along with his New Orleans homeboy, Donald Harrison, Blanchard toured extensively and recorded five albums with the legendary band.

In 1986, Blanchard and Harrison left the Jazz Messengers to form their own quintet, featuring a rhythm section of young lions, Cyrus Chestnut, Rodney Whitaker, and drummer Carl Allen. The band influenced a new generation of young jazz musicians like Christian McBride, Nicholas Payton, Geoff Keezer, and Roy Hargrove.

In 1989, Blanchard stepped away from performance to correct his embouchure, and then a year later launched his solo career. Columbia Records released his self-titled debut, which reached No. 3 on the Billboard Jazz chart.

After performing on soundtracks for Spike Lee movies, including Do the Right Thing (1989) and Mo' Better Blues (1990), Lee hired Blanchard to compose the score for Jungle Fever (1991). Since then, Blanchard has composed the original score for most of Spike Lee's films, including Malcolm X (1992), Clockers (1995), Summer of Sam (1999), 25th Hour (2002), Inside Man (2006), BlacKkKlansman (2018), and Da 5 Bloods (2020).

In addition to composing the score for Spike Lee's four-hour Hurricane Katrina documentary for HBO entitled, When the Levees Broke: A Requiem in Four Acts (2006), Blanchard appeared onscreen with his mother to document their search for her destroyed home. A year later, Blue Note Records released Blanchard's A Tale of God's Will (A Requiem for Katrina). The album features Blanchard's rearrangements of his score along with new compositions, providing listeners with his most personal and deeply affecting music to date. The recording won a 2008 Grammy Award for Best Large Jazz Ensemble Album.

Blanchard has also composed for other directors, including Gina Prince-Bythewood, Regina King, Taylor Hackford, Ron Shelton, and Kasi Lemmons. Entertainment Weekly proclaimed Blanchard "central to a general resurgence of jazz composition for film."

Blanchard recorded several award-winning albums for Columbia Records, including Simply Stated (1992), The Malcolm X Jazz Suite (1993), In My Solitude: The Billie Holiday Songbook (1994), Romantic Defiance (1995), and The Heart Speaks (1996) featuring Ivan Lins, which was nominated for a Best Latin Jazz Performance Grammy Award.

In 1999, producer Peter Gelb signed Blanchard to the Sony Classical label and released Jazz In Film, which reunited Blanchard with Donald Harrison on three tracks. It also featured jazz legends Joe Henderson and Kenny Kirkland, both of whom died soon after the recording.

Blanchard's next album entitled, Wandering Moon (2000), scored him another Grammy nomination and the prestigious honor of Downbeat Magazine's Artist of the Year.

In 2001, Blanchard released his third and final album for Sony Classical entitled, Let's Get Lost. It featured arrangements of classic songs written by Jimmy McHugh performed by his quintet with guest vocalists Diana Krall, Jane Monheit, Dianne Reeves, and Cassandra Wilson. However, it was his instrumental only version of "Lost In A Fog" that got Blanchard another Grammy nomination for Best Jazz Instrumental Solo.

In 2003, Blanchard signed with Blue Note Records and released Bounce produced by Michael Cuscuna. Two years later, legendary pianist Herbie Hancock produced Flow, garnering two more Grammy Award nominations.

In between the two Blue Note recordings, Blanchard was featured on McCoy Tyner's Illuminations with Gary Bartz, Christian McBride and Lewis Nash. The ensemble won the Grammy Award for Best Jazz Instrumental Album.

Blanchard was a judge for the fifth annual Independent Music Awards to support independent artists' careers.

In Disney's 2009 film The Princess and the Frog, Blanchard performed all of the trumpet parts for the alligator character Louis. Blanchard also voiced the role of Earl the bandleader in the riverboat band.

Fifteen years later, Blanchard was invited to produce music for the theme park attraction Tiana's Bayou Adventure, which is inspired by The Princess and the Frog.

Blanchard made history when his Fire Shut Up in My Bones became the first opera by a Black composer to be presented by the Metropolitan Opera in New York City, opening the company's 2021–22 season.

A year later, the Met premiered another Blanchard opera entitled, Champion, marking the first time since Richard Strauss that a living composer had two operas premiere in successive seasons.

== Print biography ==
In 2002, Scarecrow Press, a member of the Rowman & Littlefield Publishing Group, published Contemporary Cat: Terence Blanchard with Special Guests, an authorized biography of Blanchard written by Anthony Magro. The book features extensive interviews with Blanchard and other jazz and film greats like Branford Marsalis, Wynton Marsalis, Christian McBride, Spike Lee, Kasi Lemmons, and Michael Cristofer. Choice Reviews wrote: "Magro augments the conversations with background and connecting material so that the text flows nicely. History will view Blanchard as an important figure in jazz, and this book makes the case compellingly."

== Herbie Hancock Institute of Jazz ==
In the fall of 2000, Terence Blanchard was named artistic director of the Herbie Hancock Institute of Jazz (formerly Thelonious Monk Institute of Jazz) at the University of California Los Angeles. Herbie Hancock serves as chairman; Wayne Shorter, Clark Terry and Jimmy Heath were members of the board of trustees. The conservatory offers an intensive, tuition-free, two-year master's program to a limited number of students (maximum of eight every two years).

In his role as artistic director, Blanchard works with the students in the areas of artistic development, arranging, composition, and career counseling. He also participates in master classes and community outreach activities associated with the program. "Out of my desire to give something back to the jazz community, I wanted to get involved. In fact, I've always said that if I wasn't a musician, that I would like to be a teacher. So I was glad to get involved and to be a part of this unique program that fosters such an open and accessible environment."

In April 2007, the Institute announced its "Commitment to New Orleans" initiative which includes the relocation of the program to the campus of Loyola University New Orleans from Los Angeles. Blanchard had passionately lobbied the institute to relocate saying, "After Hurricane Katrina, New Orleans was shaken and its musical roots were threatened. I grew up in this city and learned about jazz here at Loyola with other young jazz musicians like Wynton and Branford Marsalis and I know that the Institute will have a great impact on jazz and in our communities. We are going to work hard to help jazz and New Orleans flourish once again."

== Other work ==
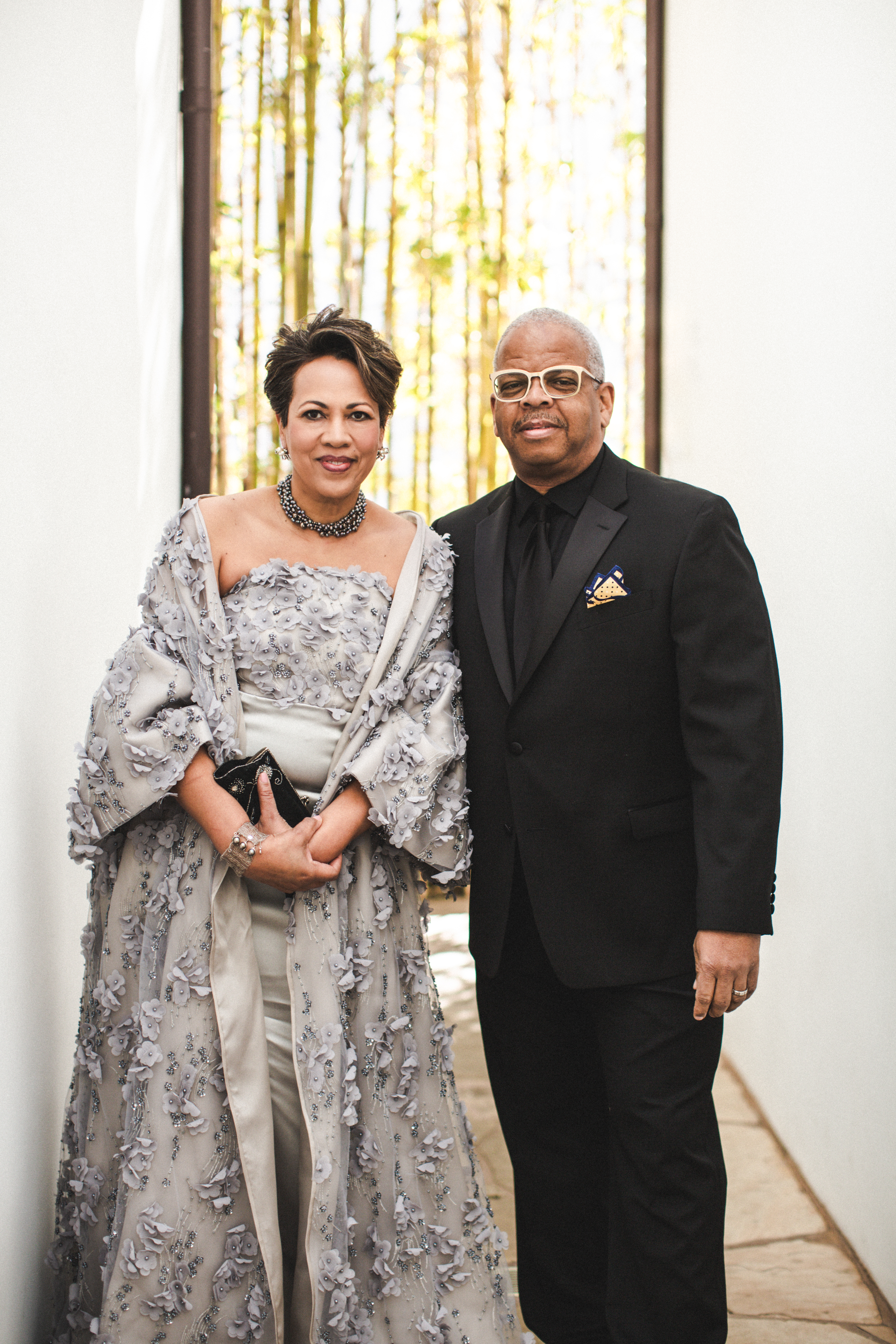
Blanchard and his wife, Robin Burgess, at the 91st Academy Awards, where Blanchard was nominated for Best Original Score for his soundtrack of BlacKkKlansman.

In 2007, the Monterey Jazz Festival named Blanchard Artist-In-Residence, citing him as "one his generation’s most artistically mature and innovative artists and a committed supporter of jazz education." The Monterey Jazz Festival 50th Anniversary Band featuring Blanchard on trumpet made a 54-date, 10-week tour of the United States from January 8, 2008, to March 16, 2008. Rounding out the band were saxophonist James Moody, pianist Benny Green, bassist Derrick Hodge and drummer Kendrick Scott. The special ensemble also featured jazz singer Nnenna Freelon.

In December 2007, the Terence Blanchard Quintet performed the movie music of Spike Lee and Terence Blanchard with an orchestra and singers Dee Dee Bridgewater, Kurt Elling, and Raul Midón at the John F. Kennedy Center for the Performing Arts in Washington, D.C.

In November 2008, he was a guest on Private Passions, the biographical music discussion programme on BBC Radio 3.

On February 10, 2008, Blanchard won his first Grammy Award as a bandleader for A Tale of God's Will (A Requiem for Katrina) in the category of Best Large Jazz Ensemble Album. His two other Grammy Awards were as a sideman for Art Blakey (1984) and McCoy Tyner (2004).

Blanchard composed original music for Stephen Adly Guirgis's Broadway play The Motherfucker With the Hat, which premiered at the Gerald Schoenfeld Theatre on April 11, 2011. The show is described as "a high-octane verbal cage match about love, fidelity and misplaced haberdashery."

On January 20, 2012, the film Red Tails was released nationwide in the United States. Blanchard served as the composer of the original score, marking the first time he has worked with executive producer George Lucas.

He composed incidental music for the 2012 Broadway revival of A Streetcar Named Desire.

He released Magnetic May 28, 2013, on Blue Note Records.

Blanchard's album, Breathless, with his new band, The E-Collective, was released by Blue Note Records on May 26, 2015. Featuring Maroon 5's PJ Morton on three cuts, and JRei Oliver, Terence's son, on spoken word, the core band consists of Fabian Almazan on keyboards, Charles Altura on guitar, Donald Ramsey on bass, and Oscar Seaton on drums. Cuepoint, on the web publishing site, Medium, published Blanchard's essay, "Using Music to Underscore Three Words: I Can't Breathe" which details Blanchard's revulsion by the death of Eric Garner and how the subsequent "I Can't Breathe" campaign inspired the series of songs the E-Collective created for the album.

On November 9, 2019, Blanchard performed alongside Lady Gaga as a special guest during her Jazz and Piano show in Las Vegas, Nevada.

=== Operas ===
On June 15, 2013, after a workshop with Opera Fusion: New Works, Blanchard premiered his first opera, Champion, at the Opera Theatre of Saint Louis. It is about the life of prize fighting boxer Emile Griffith from St. Thomas, with a libretto by Pulitzer Prize-winning Michael Cristofer. It starred Denyce Graves, Aubrey Allicock, Robert Orth, and Arthur Woodley. Champion made its Metropolitan Opera premiere in 2023, receiving the best opera recording Grammy, and its Lyric Opera of Chicago premier in 2024.

On June 15, 2019, Blanchard's second opera, Fire Shut Up in My Bones, with a libretto by Kasi Lemmons, was premiered by the Opera Theatre of Saint Louis. The opera, based on the 2014 memoir of the same title by Charles Blow, was expanded with added dance sequences and a larger role for the part of Billie, Charles's mother, and opened the Metropolitan Opera's 2021–2022 season. It closed the Lyric Opera of Chicago's 2021–2022 mainstage opera season. Blanchard is the first Black composer to have an opera performed at the Metropolitan Opera.

== Discography ==
=== As leader/co-leader ===
A complete discography of Blanchard's jazz recordings as a bandleader.

Year recorded	Title	Genre	Label	Year released
1983	New York Second Line (with Donald Harrison)	Jazz	Concord	1984
1984	Discernment (with Harrison)	Jazz	Concord	1986
1986	Nascence (with Harrison)	Jazz	Columbia	1986
1987	Crystal Stair (with Harrison)	Jazz	Columbia	1987
1988	Black Pearl (with Harrison)	Jazz	Columbia	1988
1991?	Terence Blanchard	Jazz	Columbia	1991
1992?	Simply Stated	Jazz	Columbia	1992
1992	The Malcolm X Jazz Suite	Jazz	Columbia	1993
1993	In My Solitude: The Billie Holiday Songbook	Jazz	Columbia	1994
1994	Romantic Defiance	Jazz	Columbia	1995
1995	The Heart Speaks	Latin jazz	Columbia	1996
1998	Jazz in Film	Jazz	Sony Classical	1999
1999	Wandering Moon	Jazz	Sony Classical	2000
2001	Let's Get Lost: The Songs of Jimmy McHugh	Jazz	Sony Classical	2001
2003	Bounce	Jazz	Blue Note	2003
2004	Flow	Jazz	Blue Note	2005
2007?	A Tale of God's Will (A Requiem for Katrina)	Jazz	Blue Note	2007
2009	Choices	Jazz	Concord	2009
2011	Chano y Dizzy! (with Poncho Sanchez)	Latin Jazz	Concord	2011
2013?	Magnetic	Jazz	Blue Note	2013
2015?	Breathless (featuring The E-Collective)	Jazz, fusion	Blue Note	2015
2017	Live (featuring The E-Collective)	Jazz, fusion	Blue Note	2018
2021?	Absence (featuring The E-Collective)	Jazz, fusion	Blue Note	2021

=== As sideman ===
With Art Blakey

- Oh-By the Way (Timeless, 1982)
- New York Scene (Concord, 1984) – live
- Blue Night (Timeless, 1985)

With Cedar Walton

- 1990: As Long as There's Music (Muse, 1993)
- 1997: Roots (Astor Place, 1997)

With others

- Joanne Brackeen, Fi-Fi Goes to Heaven (Concord Jazz, 1987) – rec. 1986
- Terri Lyne Carrington, Jazz Is a Spirit (ACT, 2002) – rec. 2001
- Kenny Drew Jr., The Rainbow Connection (Evidence, 1988)
- Robert Glasper, Double-Booked (Blue Note, 2009) – voice in 1 track
- Benny Green, Prelude (Criss Cross Jazz, 1988)
- Ralph Moore, Images (Landmark, 1989) – rec. 1988
- Gregory Porter, Nat King Cole & Me (Blue Note, 2017) – 2 tracks

== Filmography ==
A selected filmography of Terence Blanchard scores.

- Denotes whether its available on CD

=== Film ===
Year	Title	Director	Notes
1991	Jungle Fever	Spike Lee	
1992	Malcolm X*	Spike Lee	
1994	Sugar Hill*	Leon Ichaso	
1994	Trial by Jury	Heywood Gould	
1994	The Inkwell	Matty Rich	
1994	Crooklyn	Spike Lee	
1995	Clockers*	Spike Lee	
1996	Get on the Bus	Spike Lee	
1997	Eve's Bayou*	Kasi Lemmons	
1997	'Til There Was You	Scott Winant	with Miles Goodman
1997	4 Little Girls	Spike Lee	Documentary
1998	Gia	Michael Cristofer	
1999	Summer of Sam	Spike Lee	
2000	Love & Basketball	Gina Prince-Bythewood	
2000	Next Friday	Steve Carr	
2000	Bamboozled	Spike Lee	
2001	The Caveman's Valentine*	Kasi Lemmons	
2001	Original Sin*	Michael Cristofer	
2001	Glitter	Vondie Curtis-Hall	
2002	Barbershop	Tim Story	
2002	Dark Blue	Ron Shelton	
2002	25th Hour*	Spike Lee	
2002	People I Know*	Daniel Algrant	
2004	She Hate Me*	Spike Lee	
2006	Inside Man*	Spike Lee	
2007	Talk to Me	Kasi Lemmons	
2008	Miracle at St. Anna*	Spike Lee	
2008	Cadillac Records	Darnell Martin	
2009	The Princess and the Frog	John Musker and Ron Clements	Trumpet playing for the Louis character
2010	Bunraku	Guy Moshe	
2010	Just Wright	Sanaa Hamri	
2012	Red Tails*	Anthony Hemingway	
2014	Black or White	Mike Binder	
2015	Chi-Raq	Spike Lee	
2016	The Comedian*	Taylor Hackford	
2018	BlacKkKlansman*	Spike Lee	
2019	Harriet*	Kasi Lemmons	
2020	Da 5 Bloods*	Spike Lee	
2020	One Night in Miami...*	Regina King	
2022	The Woman King*	Gina Prince-Bythewood	
2026	By Any Means	Elegance Batton	
2027	Children of Blood and Bone	Gina Prince-Bythewood	

=== Television ===
Year	Title	Director	Notes
1999	Having Our Say	Lynne Littman	CBS Television film
2003	Unchained Memories*	Ed Bell and Thomas Lennon	HBO Documentary
2006	When the Levees Broke	Spike Lee	HBO Documentary miniseries
2020-2023	Perry Mason	—N/a	HBO series; 10 episodes
2021	Genius: Aretha	—N/a	NatGeo series; 7 episodes
2021	NYC Epicenters 9/11-2021	Spike Lee	HBO Documentary series; 4 episodes
2022	Louis Armstrong's Black and Blue	Sacha Jenkins	Apple TV+ documentary

== Awards and honors ==
Blanchard has received numerous accolades including winning five Grammy Awards. He has also received three Academy Award for Best Original Score nominations for BlacKkKlansman (2018) and Da 5 Bloods (2020),and an Emmy nomination for They Call Me Magic in the category of Outstanding Music Composition for a Documentary Series(2022).

He has also received nominations for a BAFTA Award, a Golden Globe Award, and a Primetime Emmy Award.

In 2024 he was awarded the Award of Merit for Achievement from APAP, the Association of Performing Arts Professionals.

In July 2026 he was awarded the biannual Gutenberg Teacher Award by the Gutenberg Teaching Council (GTC),"in recognition of his outstanding work as a musician and composer and, specifically, as a teacher and mentor," pointed out JGU President Professor Georg Krausch.
