= Kendrick Scott =

American jazz drummer, bandleader, and composer

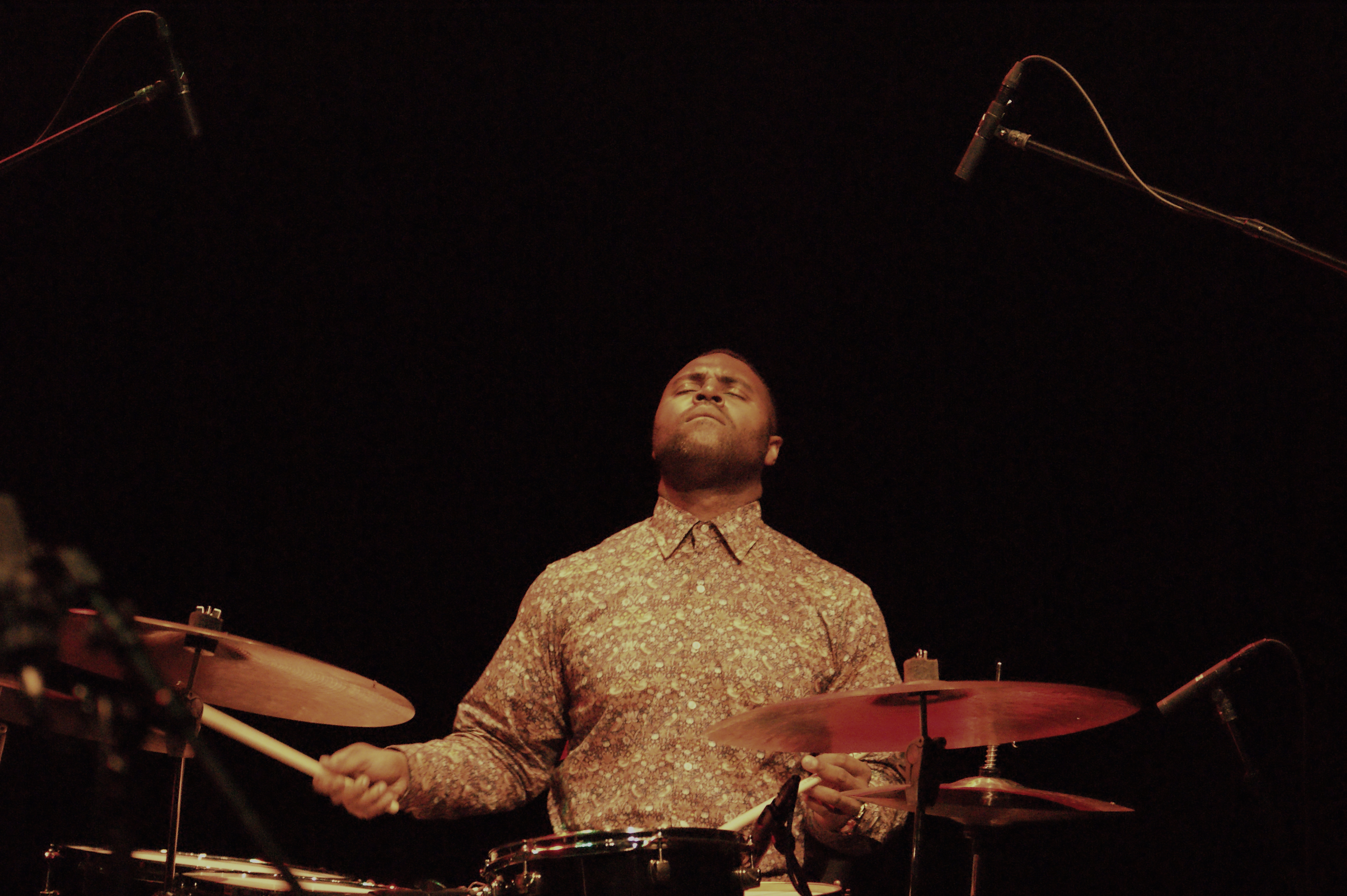
- Scott performing in Rotterdam in 2014

Background information
- Born: Kendrick Allen DeWitt Scott; July 8, 1980 (age 46); Houston, Texas, U.S.
- Genres: Jazz
- Occupation: Musician
- Instrument: Drums
- Years active: 1990s–present
- Labels: World Culture Music, various
- Website: www.kendrickscott.com

Kendrick Scott (born July 8, 1980) is an American jazz drummer, bandleader, and composer. He is the founder of the record label World Culture Music.

== Biography ==
Kendrick A.D. Scott was born and raised in Houston. The first encounters Kendrick had with the drums were in church, where his parents, Kenneth and Stepheny, and older brother were involved in the music ministry. Scott was later accepted to Houston's famed High School for the Performing and Visual Arts (HSPVA) where his high school career culminated in many awards - the most notable being The Clifford Brown/Stan Getz Fellowship, given by the International Association for Jazz Education (IAJE) and The National Foundation for the Advancement of the Arts. Upon graduation from high school in 1998, Kendrick was awarded a scholarship to attend the famed Berklee College of Music in Boston, MA, majoring in Music Education. Since graduating from Berklee in 2002, Scott has performed with a variety of name artists including the Jazz Crusaders, guitarist Pat Metheny, saxophonists Joe Lovano and Kenny Garrett, vocalists Dianne Reeves, Lizz Wright, Gretchen Parlato and trumpeter Terence Blanchard, to name a few. He also was a member of the Berklee-Monterey Quartet, performing at the legendary Monterey Jazz Festival in 1999-2000, 2002 and 2007.

Scott’s debut recording with his group Oracle recorded The Source in 2006, including pianists Aaron Parks and Robert Glasper, guitarist Lionel Loueke, vocalist Gretchen Parlato, and others. Scott also performed with the Terence Blanchard Quintet on the album A Tale of God’s Will (A Requiem for Katrina) (2007), which was nominated for two Grammy Awards for 2008. Kendrick was a member of the band that accompanied Terence Blanchard to the Monterey Jazz Festival’s 50th anniversary in 2007, and Scott embarked on the 22-state tour, starting in January, 2008 with the 50th Anniversary MJF All-Star Band. It featured the leaders of the past, present and future with Terence Blanchard on trumpet, James Moody on saxophone, Benny Green on piano, Derrick Hodge on bass, and jazz vocalist Nnenna Freelon.

Scott also currently plays with the Charles Lloyd Quartet, featuring alongside Reuben Rogers on bass, and Gerald Clayton on piano.

== Selective discography ==
=== As leader ===
Year recorded	Title	Label	Year released
2006–07	The Source	World Culture Music	2007
2008	Reverence	Criss Cross Jazz	2010
2013?	Conviction	World Culture Music	2013
2015?	We Are the Drum	Blue Note	2015
2019?	A Wall Becomes a Bridge	Blue Note	2019

=== As group ===
Blue Note All Stars

- Our Point of View (Blue Note, 2017)[2CD]

=== As sideman ===
Leader	Title	Label	Year
David Doruzka	Hidden Paths	Cube-Metier	2004
Terence Blanchard	Flow	Blue Note	2005
Patrick Cornelius	Lucid Dream	Acoustic Recording	2006
Danny Grissett	Promise	Criss Cross Jazz	2006
Terence Blanchard	A Tale of God’s Will (A Requiem for Katrina)	Blue Note	2007
Chihiro Yamanaka	Abyss	Verve	2007
Mike Moreno	Third Wish	Criss Cross Jazz	2008
Lage Lund	Early Songs	Criss Cross Jazz	2008
Myron Walden	Momentum	Demi Sound	2009
Terence Blanchard	Choices	Concord	2009
Gretchen Parlato	In a Dream	ObliqSound	2009
Will Vinson	Stockholm Syndrome	Criss Cross	2010
Myron Walden	To Feel	Demi Sound	2010
Myron Walden	What We Share	Demi Sound	2010
Chihiro Yamanaka	Forever Begins	Verve	2010
Michal Bugala	1st Touch	Hudobný Fond	2010
Mike Moreno	First in Mind	Criss Cross Jazz	2011
Gretchen Parlato	The Lost and Found	ObliqSound	2011
Walter Smith III	Still Casual	Self Produced	2015
Robert Glasper	Let Go	Loma Vista Recordings	2024
