= OffBeat (music magazine) =

American monthly music magazine based in New Orleans

- Editor-in-chief: Jan V. Ramsey
- Categories: Music magazine
- Frequency: Monthly
- Founded: 1987
- First issue: 1987
- Final issue: 2024
- Company: OffBeat, Inc.
- Based in: New Orleans
- Language: English
- Website: Official website
- ISSN: 1090-0810

OffBeat is a New Orleans, Louisiana monthly local music magazine founded by Jan V. Ramsey in 1987. The magazine, published by OffBeat, Inc., focuses on the popular music of New Orleans and Louisiana, which is generally R&B, blues, jazz, rock, hip-hop, funk, and many other traditional styles of music popular in Louisiana. OffBeat was the first magazine in New Orleans to resume publishing after the devastation of Hurricane Katrina, despite losing all its staff and its printer.

== History ==
OffBeat publishes several music festival oriented issues, including the "French Quarter Festival Souvenir Guide" in early April, and the "Jazz Fest Bible," a special Jazz Fest issue. These issues contain schedules of local music festivals, detailed information on performers and club listings, and interviews with local musicians. The magazine hosts a local music awards series, "The Best of the Beat Awards", to highlight local music and musicians, and also runs the "Louisiana Music Directory," containing listings of bands, musicians, record labels, and clubs in the state.

With its April 2020 issue, OffBeat transitioned to a digital-only distribution model.

In December 2024, Offbeat issued its last edition, bringing an end to a 37-year chronicle of the city’s music and culture.

== Cultural impact ==
According to Sarah Ravits writing for another local publication, OffBeat "garnered a global readership and helped solidify New Orleans’ reputation as an international music destination." Melissa A. Weber, curator at Tulane University, has written that "[a]s New Orleans’ premiere entertainment monthly, OffBeat’s consistent reporting allowed for expanded coverage of topics that may have been overlooked in local weekly newspapers."

OffBeat is featured in the HBO series Treme. Its editorial resulted in the creation of characters (such as "DJ Davis McAlary", in reality local musician/DJ/writer Davis Rogan), and storylines in the series.

In 2023, Krewe du Vieux honored Ramsey and OffBeat by selecting her as their Mardi Gras Queen and developing the krewe's annual theme based on a humorous pun of the magazine's name.
