= Nearness (album) =

Live album by Joshua Redman and Brad Mehldau
- Released: September 9, 2016
- Recorded: July 7, November 12, 14, 16, 23, 24, 2011
- Genre: Jazz
- Length: 73:40
- Label: Nonesuch
- Producers: Joshua Redman, Brad Mehldau

Joshua Redman chronology
The Bad Plus Joshua Redman (2015)	Nearness (2016)	Still Dreaming (2018)

Brad Mehldau chronology
Where Do You Start (2008–11)	Nearness (2011)	Variations on a Melancholy Theme (2013)

Singles from Nearness
- 1. "Ornithology" Released: August 7, 2016; 2. "In Walked Bud" Released: March 17, 2017

Nearness is an album by jazz saxophonist Joshua Redman and pianist Brad Mehldau. It contains six duets recorded in concerts in Europe during 2011. The record was released on September 9, 2016, by Nonesuch. It was Grammy-nominated for Best Jazz Instrumental Album at the end of 2016. The record also produced two singles.

== Background ==
Pianist Mehldau played in saxophonist Redman's quartet in the 1990s, and Redman played on Mehldau's 2010 album Highway Rider. A further collaboration involved Mehldau producing Redman's 2012 recording Walking Shadows.

== Music and recording ==
The six tracks are taken from concert recordings made during the duo's tour of Europe in 2011. Mehldau commented on the selection of material for the album:

We had in the back of our mind that it might be a record, but also had discussed a studio recording. We felt strongly after listening that live was the way to go, because so much of the excitement of the music for both Josh and I was wrapped up in the white heat of the live performance.

The album contains three originals and three covers, but none of the rock covers that they played on the tour. On "Ornithology", "Redman's tenor traces the shape of the tune while Mehldau capriciously deconstructs the harmony and rhythms." It "begins with the familiar cascade of swinging eighth notes, but almost immediately there are tempo shifts and rapid mood changes." The theme of Thelonious Monk's "In Walked Bud" is largely implied rather than made explicit. The tempo is then reduced, and alterations suggest another Monk composition, "Bright Mississippi". "Without abandoning the structure and melody, they take the piece far afield. Then both musicians solo, concluding the piece with an improvised duet that accents the myriad possibilities in the tune." "The Nearness of You" "highlights Mehldau's harmonic adventurousness and features a tour-de-force unaccompanied break from Redman" that ends the piece. It is played at a very slow tempo.

Redman plays soprano saxophone on the Mehldau compositions "Always August" and "Old West". The latter and Redman's 5/4 composition "Mehlsancholy Mode" "feature the serene, pastoral themes that became popular during the ECM recordings of the '70s and '80s, but each musician takes thorny solos, more characteristic of free jazz."

== Release and reception ==
The album was released on September 9, 2016. The pair toured the US in September and October that year to promote it.

The reviewer for The Wall Street Journal described it as "an impressive work that showcases two active minds smartly updating classics." AllMusic selected it as one of their Favorite Jazz Albums of 2016.

Professional ratings
Aggregate scores
Source	Rating
Metacritic	82/100
Review scores
Source	Rating
All About Jazz	4.5/5 stars
AllMusic	4/5 stars
BBC Music Magazine	5/5 stars
Financial Times	4/5 stars
The Guardian	4/5 stars
Laut.de	4/5 stars
PopMatters	8/10
Record Collector	3/5 stars
RTÉ.ie	4/5 stars
The Times	4/5 stars

== Track listing ==
No.	Title	Writer(s)	Length
1.	"Ornithology"	Charlie Parker, Benny Harris	8:38
2.	"Always August"	Brad Mehldau	10:55
3.	"In Walked Bud"	Thelonious Monk	9:56
4.	"Mehlsancholy Mode"	Joshua Redman	12:36
5.	"The Nearness of You"	Hoagy Carmichael, Ned Washington	16:44
6.	"Old West"	Mehldau	14:39
Total length:			1:13:40

Track 1 recorded November 12, 2011, at Teatro Fernán Gómez, Madrid, Spain
Track 2 recorded November 16, 2011, at Kultur Casino, Bern, Switzerland
Track 3 recorded November 14, 2011, at De Oosterpoort, Groningen, Netherlands
Track 4 recorded November 24, 2011 at Alte Oper, Frankfurt am Main, Germany
Track 5 recorded November 23, 2011 at Tonhalle Düsseldorf, Düsseldorf, Germany
Track 6 recorded July 7, 2011 at Kongsberg Church, Kongsberg, Norway

== Personnel ==
- Joshua Redman – tenor sax, soprano sax
- Brad Mehldau – piano

== Charts ==
Chart (2016)	Peak position
Belgian Albums (Ultratop Flanders)	91
Belgian Albums (Ultratop Wallonia)	90
French Albums (SNEP)	146
US Top Jazz Albums (Billboard)	6
