= Après Fauré =

Recording by Brad Mehldau
- Released: May 10, 2024
- Recorded: June 19–21, 2023
- Studio: Mechanics Hall (Worcester, Massachusetts)
- Label: Nonesuch

Brad Mehldau chronology
After Bach II (2017–23)	Après Fauré (2023)	Solid Jackson (2023)

Après Fauré is a solo album by the American pianist Brad Mehldau. It consists of five compositions by the French musician Gabriel Fauré and four by Mehldau. The performances were recorded in 2023 and released by Nonesuch Records in 2024.

== Music and recording ==
The album was recorded on June 19–21, 2023 at Mechanics Hall, Worcester, Massachusetts. The Fauré material is four nocturnes and an excerpt from his Piano Quartet No. 2. For Mehldau's compositions on the album, he "devises structures based on motor rhythms but flavors them with Fauré-like harmonies."

== Release and reception ==
Professional ratings
Review scores
Source	Rating
AllMusic	4/5 stars
DownBeat	4/5 stars
Tom Hull	B

Après Fauré was released by Nonesuch Records on May 10, 2024. The AllMusic reviewer concluded: "This is an intriguing release from one of today's most interesting pianists, no matter what genre one may choose for him". The DownBeat reviewer commented on the thoughtfulness of Mehldau's liner notes for the album and wrote that his compositions "unfurl like a slow burn, the similarities and contrasts of his and Fauré's works swirling together like a fog."

== Track listing ==
All compositions by Brad Mehldau except where noted.

1. "Nocturne No. 13 in B Minor, Op. 119" (Gabriel Fauré) – 6:28
2. "Nocturne No. 4 in E-flat Major, Op. 36" (Fauré) – 6:39
3. "Nocturne No. 12 in E Minor, Op. 107" (Fauré) – 6:20
4. "Prelude" – 3:31
5. "Caprice" – 3:40
6. "Nocturne" – 2:43
7. "Vision" – 2:03
8. "Nocturne No. 7 in C-sharp Minor, Op. 74" (Fauré) – 8:39
9. "Extract from Piano Quartet No. 2 in G Minor, Opus 45: III. Adagio non troppo" (Fauré) – 2:47

== Personnel ==
- Brad Mehldau – piano
