= After Bach =

Recording by Brad Mehldau
- Released: March 9, 2018
- Recorded: April 18–20, 2017
- Studio: Mechanics Hall (Worcester, Massachusetts)
- Genre: Classical
- Length: 69:16
- Label: Nonesuch
- Producer: Brad Mehldau

Brad Mehldau chronology
Chris Thile & Brad Mehldau (2015–16)	After Bach (2017)	Finding Gabriel (2017–18)

After Bach is a solo album by pianist Brad Mehldau. It consists of five compositions from Johann Sebastian Bach's Well-Tempered Clavier interspersed with pieces by Mehldau that were inspired by them. The performances were recorded in 2017 and released by Nonesuch Records the following year.

== Background ==
Pianist Brad Mehldau is known predominantly as a jazz musician who incorporates numerous influences into his playing. Among these influences is classical music—Mehldau was classically trained—including the works of Johann Sebastian Bach. Bach was an excellent keyboardist, a necessary part of which, during his lifetime, was the ability to improvise. While such improvisation has largely been lost from classical music performance, it is fundamental to jazz musicians.

The origins of After Bach were 2015 performances by Mehldau of his compositions that were inspired by Bach and commissioned by Carnegie Hall, The Royal Conservatory of Music, The National Concert Hall, and Wigmore Hall. These were known as "Three Pieces After Bach".

== Music and recording ==
The album was recorded on April 18–20, 2017, at Mechanics Hall, Worcester, Massachusetts. Mehldau also produced the album.

The first and last pieces on the album are Mehldau compositions. In the first, "a few simple lines are developed in unexpected ways, gather complexity and then resolve with the simplicity of a perfect cadence". For the last, "the bustle of counterpoint is set aside as stark voicings gain warmth, sparse lines hover in space and a wistful melody lingers in the air". Between these two, Mehldau plays four preludes and one fugue from Bach's The Well-Tempered Clavier; each is followed by one of his own compositions that is an interpretation of the Bach piece. One is of the Prelude No. 3 in C-sharp major, which features the pianist "resetting Bach's original riff in a jerky 5/4 rhythm and taking it into a harmonically adventurous labyrinth. Similarly, a romantic, rubato-heavy reading of the F minor Prelude and Fugue is followed by a dreamlike meditation on some of the themes hinted at in Bach's original".

== Release and reception ==
Professional ratings
Review scores
Source	Rating
All About Jazz	4.5/5 stars
AllMusic	4/5 stars
Financial Times	4/5 stars
The Irish Times	4/5 stars
Laut.de	4/5 stars
Le Devoir	4/5 stars
PopMatters	8/10
Stereophile	5/5 stars
The Times	3/5 stars
Tom Hull	B

After Bach was released by Nonesuch Records on March 9, 2018. The Financial Times reviewer described it as a "beautifully formed solo piano album". The reviewer for The Guardian commented on the harmonic complexities in the Mehldau pieces, and noted that the last two tracks were more straightforward to engage with emotionally. AllMusic summarized the record as "a warm, endlessly listenable album that still pushes plenty of musical boundaries". A follow-up album, After Bach II, was released in 2024.

== Track listing ==
1. "Before Bach: Benediction" – 5:27
2. "The Well-Tempered Clavier Book I, BWV 848: Prelude No. 3 in C# Major" – 1:21
3. "After Bach: Rondo" – 8:21
4. "The Well-Tempered Clavier Book II, BWV 870: Prelude No. 1 in C Major" – 2:36
5. "After Bach: Pastorale" – 3:46
6. "The Well-Tempered Clavier Book I, BWV 855: Prelude No. 10 in E Minor" – 2:16
7. "After Bach: Flux" – 5:06
8. "The Well-Tempered Clavier Book I, BWV 857: Prelude and Fugue No. 12 in F Minor" – 6:10
9. "After Bach: Dream" – 7:50
10. "The Well-Tempered Clavier Book II, BWV 885: Fugue No. 16 in G Minor" – 3:04
11. "After Bach: Ostinato" – 12:20
12. "Prayer for Healing" – 11:06

== Personnel ==
- Brad Mehldau – piano

== Charts ==
Chart (2018)	Peak position
Belgian Albums (Ultratop Flanders)	61
Belgian Albums (Ultratop Wallonia)	84
Croatian International Albums (HDU)	11
French Albums (SNEP)	142
German Albums (Offizielle Top 100)	94
Italian Albums (FIMI)	78
Portuguese Albums (AFP)	45
Swiss Albums (Schweizer Hitparade)	78
US Top Classical Albums (Billboard)	3
US Top Jazz Albums (Billboard)	1
