= Don't Explain =

Don't Explain may refer to:

- "Don't Explain" (song), a 1944 song written by Billie Holiday and Arthur Herzog Jr.
- Don't Explain (Robert Palmer album), 1990
- Don't Explain (Joel Frahm album), 2001
- Don't Explain (Beth Hart and Joe Bonamassa album), 2011
- Don't Explain (DVD), a 2007 sketch comedy act by The Umbilical Brothers
