= Dan Coleman (composer) =

American composer (born 1972)

- Born: January 12, 1972 (age 54); New York City
- Occupations: Composer; arranger; conductor; publisher

Dan Coleman (born January 12, 1972, in New York City) is a composer and music publisher.

He studied music at the University of Pennsylvania, the Juilliard School, and the Aspen Music Festival and School where his teachers included George Tsontakis, Jay Reise, George Crumb, William Bolcom, Robert Beaser, Stephen Albert, and Bruce Adolphe. He is the first composer alumnus of Young Concert Artists.

His music has been commissioned and performed by leading ensembles, including the American Composers Orchestra, the Chamber Music Society of Lincoln Center, Cypress String Quartet, Dallas Symphony, Fresno Philharmonic, Honolulu Symphony, Indianapolis Symphony, Knoxville Symphony Orchestra, New York Chamber Symphony, Orpheus Chamber Orchestra, Pacific Northwest Ballet, San Jose Chamber Orchestra, Festival Mozaic Orchestra, Seattle Chamber Music Society, St. Luke's Chamber Ensemble, Saint Paul Chamber Orchestra, Utah Symphony, and the Tucson Symphony Orchestra, where he has held the post of composer-in-residence since 2002.

In 2004 he and Bob Donnelly founded Modern Works Music Publishing, an independent music publishing administrator.

== Selected works ==
Orchestra

- Long ago, this radiant day (1994)
- Chamber Symphony (1997)
- The Voice of the Rain (1997)
- Focoso (2002)
- L'alma respira (2002)
- Imagining the Dance (2019)

Concertante

- Pavanes and Symmetries – for flute and string orchestra (2000)

Chamber music

- Dezembrum – for viola and cello (1992)
- The Only Dance There Is – for violin and piano (1993)
- Sonata in Two Acts – for violin and piano (1996)
- Sonata notturna – for violin and piano (1997)
- Sad and Ancient Phrases – for violin and piano (1999)
- String Quartet No. 1 "Quartetto ricercare" (1999, revised 2003)
- "Quintet (after Elizabeth Bishop)" (2001)
- Summer – for viola and piano (2003)
- String Quartet No. 2 (2004)
- String Quartet No. 3 "together, as the river" (2016)

Piano

- Burden of Dreams (1993)
- Quasi fantasia (1998)
- Night Singing (2005)

== Awards and honors ==
Dan Coleman has been the recipient of various awards and honors:

- 2004: Copland House / Sylvia Goldstein Award
- 2003: Indianapolis Symphony Orchestra / Marilyn K. Glick Composer's Award
- 2001: NFMC Beyer Composition Award
- 2001: Symphony in C Composer's Competition
- 2001: Auros Group for New Music Composer Award
- 2001: New Music USA (Meet The Composer) Music Alive Grant
- 2000: Arizona Commission on the Arts Fellowship
- 1999: Tisch School First Run Festival Best Original Score
- 1998: Whitaker Commission from the American Composers Orchestra
- 1997: Victor Herbert/ASCAP award for his Sonata in Two Acts
- 1996: grant from Commissioning Music/USA (a partnership between the NEA, Meet The Composer and the Helen F. Whitaker Fund)
- 1995: Charles Ives Scholarship from the American Academy of Arts and Letters
- 1995: First Music orchestral commission from the New York Youth Symphony.

== Selected discography ==
As composer

- 1996: Metamorphosen Chamber Orchestra (Albany Records 194)
- 2004: Kevin Cobb, "One" (Summit Records 401)
- 2006: Sheila Browne & Wesley Baldwin, "Lutoslawski, Clarke, Beethoven, Hindesmith, Coleman, Piston: Works for Viola & Cello" (Centaur 2798)
- 2006: Lara Downes, "Dream of Me" (Tritone Records B000H4VVWU)
- 2007: Carol Rodland, "Viola Swirl" (Crystal Records 834)
- 2015: Jennifer Frautschi & John Blacklow, "American Duos" (Albany Records 1593)
- 2018: Johanna Lundy, "Canyon Songs: Art, Nature, Devotion" (MSR Classics MS 1684)
- 2018: Alice K. Dade, "Living Music" (Naxos 8559831)

As arranger

- 1995: Lisa Loeb, Tails
- 1997: Lisa Loeb, Firecracker
- 1999: Music from the motion Picture Anywhere But Here
- 2002: Lisa Loeb, Cake and Pie
- 2006: Calexico, Garden Ruin
- 2013: Joshua Redman, Walking Shadows
- 2013: Calexico, Spritoso

As conductor

- 2010: Brad Mehldau, Highway Rider
- 2012: Jake Shimabukuro, Grand Ukulele
- 2025: Brad Mehldau, Ride into the Sun
