= Modern Music (Brad Mehldau and Kevin Hays album) =

Studio album by Brad Mehldau, Kevin Hays
- Released: September 20, 2011
- Recorded: October 2010
- Studio: Mechanics Hall (Worcester, Massachusetts)
- Genre: Classical, avante-garde
- Length: 47:43
- Label: Nonesuch
- Producer: Patrick Zimmerli

Brad Mehldau chronology
Love Songs (2010)	Modern Music (2010)	Ode (2008–11)

Modern Music is an album by pianists Brad Mehldau and Kevin Hays.

== Background ==
The three protagonists for the album – composer and arranger Patrick Zimmerli, and pianists Brad Mehldau and Kevin Hays – were friends. Mehldau was already known for mixing elements from forms of music other than jazz into his performances, and Hays had more recently extended "from his signature, intelligent, hard swinging post-bop approach to include compositions with modern classical touches".

== Music and recording ==
The album was recorded in October 2010 at Mechanics Hall in Worcester, Massachusetts. Zimmerli composed four of the pieces and arranged the others, which included an original each from Mehldau and Hays. The three Zimmerli pieces have "busy palettes, intricate cross-keyboard dialogues, and contrapuntal studies".

== Reception ==
The album was released by Nonesuch Records on September 20, 2011. The AllMusic reviewer concluded that "it's not a jazz album, but one in which new considerations of harmonic composition and intra-instrument dialogue are readily apparent and delivered upon with discipline as well as verve". The Financial Times reviewer commented on the two pianists' awareness of what they were doing together and the positive impact of the structure of their playing.

Professional ratings
Review scores
Source	Rating
AllMusic	3.5/5 stars
Financial Times	5/5 stars
The Guardian	4/5 stars
Tom Hull	B+

== Track listing ==
1. "Crazy Quilt" (Patrick Zimmerli) – 6:21
2. "Unrequited" (Brad Mehldau) – 6:27
3. "Generatrix" (Zimmerli) – 5:12
4. "Celtic Folk Melody" (Zimmerli) – 2:58
5. "Excerpt from Music for 18 Musicians" (Steve Reich) – 5:20
6. "Lonely Woman" (Ornette Coleman) – 6:31
7. "Modern Music" (Zimmerli) – 4:59
8. "Elegia" (Kevin Hays) – 6:20
9. "Excerpt from String Quartet No. 5" (Philip Glass) – 3:45

== Personnel ==
- Brad Mehldau – piano
- Kevin Hays – piano
