= After Bach II =

Recording by Brad Mehldau
- Released: May 10, 2024
- Recorded: April 18–20, 2017, June 21, 2023
- Studio: Mechanics Hall (Worcester, Massachusetts)
- Label: Nonesuch

Brad Mehldau chronology
The Folly of Desire (2022)	After Bach II (2017–23)	Après Fauré (2023)

After Bach II is a solo album by pianist Brad Mehldau. It consists of five compositions from Johann Sebastian Bach's Well-Tempered Clavier and his Partita for keyboard No. 4, interspersed with pieces by Mehldau. The performances were recorded in 2017 and 2023 and released by Nonesuch Records in 2024.

== Background ==
This album is a follow-up to Mehldau's After Bach, which was released in 2018.

== Music and recording ==
The album was recorded on April 18–20, 2017, and June 21, 2023, at Mechanics Hall, Worcester, Massachusetts. The Bach material includes four preludes and a fugue from Well-Tempered Clavier and the Allemande movement of the Partita for keyboard No. 4. The other pieces are by Mehldau, including his variations on the theme of Bach's Goldberg Variations. The origin of these variations was an invitation for Mehldau to play at the Verbier Festival: he did not want to play one of Bach's originals in a program performed by classical pianists, so instead improvised a variation. Two of Mehldau's variations on the album are in 5/8 time and one is in 7/4.

== Release and reception ==
Professional ratings
Review scores
Source	Rating
AllMusic	4.5/5 stars
DownBeat	4/5 stars
Tom Hull	B−

After Bach II was released by Nonesuch Records on May 10, 2024. The AllMusic reviewer mentioned the variations on the Goldberg Variations as a highlight, writing: "these are unlike anything done elsewhere, and they provide new avenues that one hopes Mehldau will explore in further releases". The DownBeat reviewer wrote: "The precise and intricate hallmarks of Baroque-era melody and harmony writing bond the two composers and give After Bach II its technical untiy. [...] The album stimulates, challenges and provides fastidious guidance all at once."

== Track listing ==
All compositions by Brad Mehldau except where noted.

1. "Prelude to Prelude" – 1:22
2. "Prelude No. 9 in E Major from The Well-Tempered Clavier, Book I, BWV 854" (Johann Sebastian Bach) – 1:48
3. "Prelude No. 6 in D Minor from The Well-Tempered Clavier Book I, BWV 851" (Bach) – 1:18
4. "After Bach: Toccata" – 14:42
5. "Partita for Keyboard No. 4 in D Major, BWV 828: II. Allemande" (Bach) – 8:11
6. "After Bach: Cavatina" – 5:16
7. "Prelude No. 20 in A Minor from The Well-Tempered Clavier Book I, BWV 865" (Bach) – 1:07
8. "Between Bach" – 6:05
9. "Fugue No. 20 in A Minor from The Well-Tempered Clavier Book I, BWV 865 (Bach) – 3:55
10. "Intermezzo" – 1:26
11. "Variations on Bach's Goldberg Theme: Aria-like" – 3:39
12. "Variations on Bach's Goldberg Theme: Variation I, Minor 5/8 a" – 2:12
13. "Variations on Bach's Goldberg Theme: Variation II, Minor 5/8 b" – 1:10
14. "Variations on Bach's Goldberg Theme: Variation III, Major 7/4" – 2:31
15. "Variations on Bach's Goldberg Theme: Variation IV, Breakbeat" – 1:40
16. "Variations on Bach's Goldberg Theme: Variation V, Jazz" – 2:03
17. "Variations on Bach's Goldberg Theme: Variation VI, Finale" – 1:40
18. "Prelude No. 7 in E-Flat Major from The Well-Tempered Clavier Book I, BWV 852" (Bach) – 3:59
19. "Postlude" – 2:16

== Personnel ==
- Brad Mehldau – piano
