= Chris Thile & Brad Mehldau =

Studio album by Chris Thile, Brad Mehldau
- Released: January 27, 2017
- Recorded: December 30, 2015, January 2–3, 2016
- Studios: Avatar (New York, New York)
- Length: 63:25
- Label: Nonesuch
- Producers: Chris Thile, Brad Mehldau

Chris Thile chronology
Bass & Mandolin (2014)	Chris Thile & Brad Mehldau (2017)	Thanks for Listening (2017)

Brad Mehldau chronology
Seymour Reads the Constitution! (2012–14)	Chris Thile & Brad Mehldau (2015–16)	After Bach (2017)

Chris Thile & Brad Mehldau is an album by Chris Thile and Brad Mehldau. It was released by Nonesuch Records on January 27, 2017.

== Background ==
Mandolinist and vocalist Chris Thile and pianist Brad Mehldau first played together in 2011 when Mehldau had a residency at London's Wigmore Hall. Their first tour as a duo was two years later. They performed together again in 2015, after which they recorded this studio album.

== Music and recording ==
The album contains a mix of originals and covers. The latter "include Bob Dylan's 'Don't Think Twice It's Alright', Joni Mitchell's 'Marcie', Elliott Smith's 'Independence Day' as well as a composition by late 16th /early 17th century Irish harpist and composer Ruaidri Dáll Ó Catháin".

Thile's singing covers a range of effects, including "invoking an ethereal falsetto, the imploring call of a '50s teenage crooner, a nasal Dylanesque snarl, or a rural bluesman's grouchy defiance".

The music was recorded in Avatar Studios in New York City on December 30, 2015, and January 2–3, 2016. The album was released by Nonesuch Records on January 27, 2017. It is available as two CDs, two LPs, or as a download.

== Reception ==
Professional ratings
Aggregate scores
Source	Rating
Metacritic	78/100
Review scores
Source	Rating
Allmusic	4.5/5 stars
The Australian	4.5/5 stars
DownBeat	4/5 stars
The Guardian	4/5 stars
The Irish Times	5/5 stars
laut.de	4/5 stars
Mojo	3/5 stars
PopMatters	7/10
The Times	4/5 stars
Tom Hull	B−

The Irish Times' reviewer commented that the songs on the album "dig down into the roots of American music, touching the common ancestry of jazz and country but coming up fresh and turned boldly to the post-genre future".

Lloyd Sachs of JazzTimes stated "...this 64-minute, two-CD set is so idiosyncratic in its selection and treatment of material, it’s difficult to compare it to anything else... Throughout, the duo exploits the close relationship between keys and strings, achieving a seamless oneness on tunes such as Mehldau’s sprightly “Tallahassee Junction.” In exploring the world of Americana, Chris Thile & Brad Mehldau is sometimes cozy, sometimes haunting and sometimes, unexpectedly, both".

== Track listing ==
Disc 1

1. "The Old Shade Tree" (Brad Mehldau, Chris Thile) – 6:26
2. "Tallahassee Junction" (Mehldau) – 5:54
3. "Scarlet Town" (David Rawlings, Gillian Welch) – 6:03
4. "I Cover the Waterfront" (Johnny Green, Edward Heyman) – 7:00
5. "Independence Day" (Elliott Smith) – 3:10
6. "Noise Machine" (Thile) – 4:50

Disc 2

1. "The Watcher" (Mehldau) – 5:27
2. "Daughter of Eve" (Thile) – 8:58
3. "Marcie" (Joni Mitchell) – 4:50
4. "Don't Think Twice, It's All Right" (Bob Dylan) – 6:02
5. "Tabhair dom do Lámh" (Ruaidri Dáll Ó Catháin) – 4:19

LP bonus track: "Fast As You Can" (Fiona Apple) – 6:07

== Personnel ==
- Chris Thile – mandolin, vocals
- Brad Mehldau – piano, vocals

== Charts ==
Chart (2017)	Peak position
Belgian Albums (Ultratop Flanders)	110
Belgian Albums (Ultratop Wallonia)	133
Irish Albums (IRMA)	46
Swiss Albums (Schweizer Hitparade)	83
US Top Jazz Albums (Billboard)	1
US Top Bluegrass Albums (Billboard)	1
