= Heernt =

American jazz and indie rock band

- Origin: New York, United States
- Years active: 2004-present
- Label: Razdaz Recordz
- Members: Mark Guiliana – drums, electronics Neal Persiani – bass guitar Jason Rigby – tenor saxophone, analog synth
- Past members: Zac Colwell – saxophone, analog synth
- Website: Heernt.com

Heernt was an American, New York-based, jazz and indie rock trio. The group makes use of different sounds and rhythms led by its drummer and founder Mark Guiliana, who has been a member of the Avishai Cohen Trio and an innovative leader of shmagigi. Some of the instruments and items used by the group produce sounds akin to the cajón, trombone, typewriter, steelpan, flute and clarinet.

== Discography ==
- Locked in a Basement (2006)
