= Mehliana: Taming the Dragon =

Studio album by Brad Mehldau and Mark Guiliana
- Released: February 25, 2014
- Recorded: 2013
- Studio: Bunker Studios, Brooklyn, NY
- Genre: Avant-garde jazz, jazztronica, synth-jazz
- Length: 71:43
- Label: Nonesuch; 7559-79610 5
- Producer: Brad Mehldau & Mark Guiliana

Brad Mehldau chronology
Variations on a Melancholy Theme (2013)	Mehliana: Taming the Dragon (2014)	10 Years Solo Live (2004–14)

Mehliana: Taming the Dragon is an album by Brad Mehldau and Mark Guiliana released on the Nonesuch label in 2014. Mehldau's solo on "Sleeping Giant" was nominated for Best Improvised Jazz Solo in the 2015 Grammy Awards.

Professional ratings
Review scores
Source	Rating
All About Jazz	4.5/5 stars
AllMusic	3.5/5 stars
Down Beat	2.5/5 stars
The Guardian	4/5 stars
The Irish Times	5/5 stars
Jazzwise	4/5 stars
laut.de	4/5 stars
musicOMH	4/5 stars
PopMatters	8/10
Tom Hull	B+

== Reception ==
John Fordham of The Guardian noted, "Mehldau mostly plays old-school synths and Fender Rhodes keys, spinning melodic fragments into distant spaces to be replaced by grouchy low-end hooks and snare patterns, striking chirping treble melodies over chanting children's voices, planting steady, pop-song chord figures under acoustic themes laced with catlike whines... Guiliana balances drum-machine remorselessness with dazzling improv receptivity." Thom Jurek of AllMusic commented, "This wild melange of keyboards, beats, textures, musical styles, samples, and electronic sounds reflects jagged yet accessible compositions and improvisations whose sonics are as important as their melodies." Cormak Larkin of The Irish Times added "Even by Mehldau’s own standards, Mehliana: Taming the Dragon is a bold move, and one that may surprise, even alarm devoted followers of his acoustic playing. Teaming up with trail-blazing percussionist Mark Guiliana, Mehldau lays his talented hands on an array of electric keyboards, including the gorgeous Fender Rhodes, a prepared upright piano, and a winking bank of old-school 1970s synths. Rarely do both hands play the same keyboard at any given moment. And rarely has new music sounded so damned exciting."

== Track listing ==
Tracks 1, 6–8, 10, 11 composed by Brad Mehldau; all other tracks composed by Brad Mehldau and Mark Guiliana

1. "Taming the Dragon" - 6:42
2. "Luxe" - 5:40
3. "You Can't Go Back Now" - 5:45
4. "The Dreamer" - 5:24
5. "Elegy for Amelia E." - 7:34
6. "Sleeping Giant" - 6:17
7. "Hungry Ghost" - 5:01
8. "Gainsbourg" - 7:52
9. "Just Call Me Nige" - 5:41
10. "Sassyassed Sassafrass" - 5:52
11. "Swimming" - 4:58
12. "London Gloaming" - 4:57

== Personnel ==
- Brad Mehldau - Synthesizer, Fender Rhodes, Piano, Spoken Voice, “ahh” vocals
- Mark Guiliana - Drums, Electronics
