= Patrick Zimmerli =

American musician and composer (born 1968)

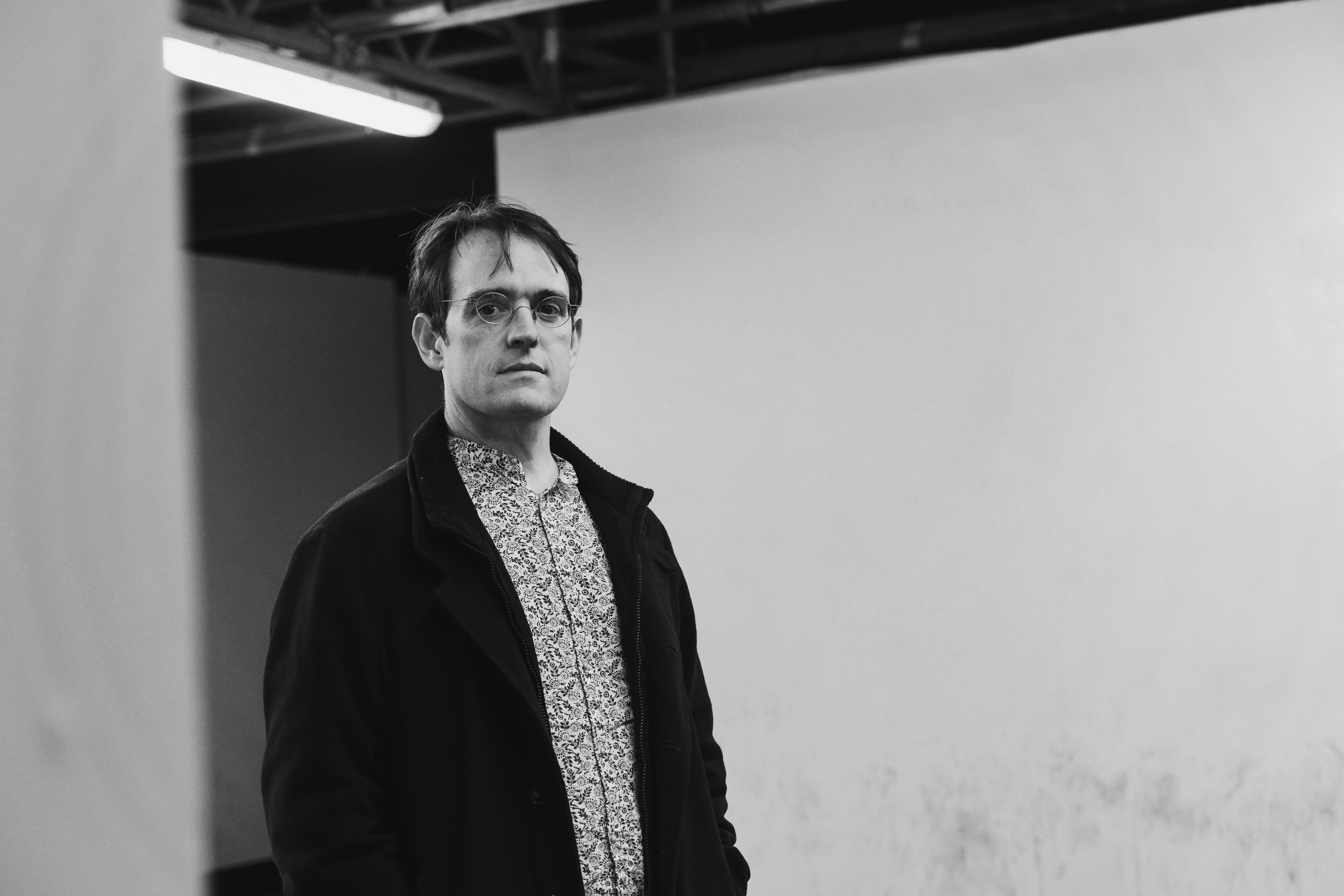

Background information
- Born: July 23, 1968 (age 57); Bronxville, New York, U.S.
- Genres: Jazz, contemporary classical, avant-garde
- Occupations: Musician, composer, arranger, record producer
- Instrument: Saxophone
- Years active: 1991–present
- Website: www.patrickzimmerli.com

Patrick Zimmerli (born July 23, 1968) is an American saxophonist, composer, arranger, and record producer.

His work has been performed at Carnegie Hall and Town Hall in New York, Wigmore Hall in London and Salle Pleyel in Paris, as well as at the Guggenheim Museum and the Museum of Modern Art. His pieces have been featured in the Seattle Chamber Music Festival, the Colorado Music Festival, the Bravo! Vail Valley Music Festival and Festival Mozaic in San Luis Obispo, California.

Notable musicians and ensembles who have commissioned or performed Zimmerli's music include Brooklyn Rider, the Knights Chamber Orchestra, the New York Classical Players, flutist Jasmine Choi, violinist Timothy Fain, pianist Anne-Marie McDermott, cellists Kristina Reiko Cooper and Brian Thornton, the Ying and Escher string quartets and the St. Paul Chamber Orchestra.

In addition to his work in the classical realm, Zimmerli has collaborated with dozens of jazz musicians over the course of his career, including Brad Mehldau, Kevin Hays, Joshua Redman, Brian Blade, Ben Monder, Larry Grenadier, Satoshi Takeishi, John Hollenbeck, Jeff Williams and Tom Rainey, as well as Ethan Iverson and Reid Anderson of The Bad Plus. In 1993, he won first prize in the first annual BMI/Thelonious Monk Composer's Competition,

== Selected works ==
- Concerto No. 1 for piano, strings and percussion (1998–99)
- Suite for solo saxophone (1999)
- Piano Trio No. 1 for violin, cello and piano (2001–02)
- Piano Trio No. 2 for violin, cello and piano (2003)
- New York Overture for chamber orchestra (2003)
- The Chase for soprano saxophone, string quartet, piano, bass and jazz percussion (2005)
- The Call for viola, two violins, cello, piano, bass and jazz percussion (2005–06)
- American Spiritual for string quartet (2005–06)
- The Light Guitar for solo violin (2006)
- Narratives for solo piano (2004–07)
- Stone and Steel for cello, piano and jazz percussion (2007)
- Three Romances for violin and piano (2008)
- Spectres for solo viola (2008)
- Chamber Symphony for chamber orchestra (2008)
- Light, Color, Line, Symbol for orchestra and video (2009)
- Trio for flute, viola and harp (2009)
- Introduction and Allegro for piano four-hands (2010)
- Festival Overture for orchestra (2011)
- Quintet for violin, viola, cello, piano and jazz percussion (2011)
- Sonata for solo cello (2012)
- Parisian Memories/Parisian Dreams for saxophone, viola, violin, cello and piano (2012)
- Aspects of Darkness and Light Part I for tenor saxophone, string quartet, bass and percussion (2012)
- Aspects of Darkness and Light Part II for tenor saxophone, string quartet, bass and percussion (2013)
- Signs of Life for marimba and jazz piano (2014)
- Three Shakespeare Sonnets for bass voice and piano (2014)
- Twelve Preludes for solo organ (2010–14)
- Concerto No 2. for piano, jazz percussion and orchestra (revised) (2001–02, 2004, 2014)
- Sonata for Clarinet and Piano “Tempting Fates” (2015)
- Clockworks for tenor saxophone, piano, bass and drums (2016)
- Gathering Pools for 12 percussion soloists (2016)
- Waterfalls for 12 percussion soloists (2016)
- This Comforting Earth for soprano saxophone, piano, fender rhodes and 2 percussionists (2016)
- Anthems for full choir (SSAATTBB) (2017)
- Alan Seeger: Instrument of Destiny for men's choir, tenor soloist, jazz piano and percussion (revised) (2017, 2019)
- Piano Trio No. 3 (2019)
- Nonet for Saxophones, brass, and rhythm (2019)
- Messages for piano, classical saxophone quartet, bass and percussion (2019)
- Concerto for flute, percussion and orchestra (2020)

== Discography ==
- Jazz Ambassadors, (Jazz City, 1995)
- Explosion, (Songlines, 1995)
- Twelve Sacred Dances, (Arabesque, 1998)
- Expansion, (Songlines, 2000)
- Book of Hours, Octurn (Songlines, 2002)
- Phoenix, (Songlines, 2003)
- Piano Trios Nos. 1 & 2, (Arabesque, 2004)
- Stone and Steel, Kristina Reiko Cooper (Koch, 2008)
- Modern Music, Brad Mehldau and Kevin Hays (Nonesuch, 2011)
- River of Light, Tim Fain (Naxos, 2011)
- Walking Shadows, Joshua Redman (arranger) (Nonesuch, 2013)
- Shores Against Silence (2016)
- Clockworks, (Songlines, 2018)
- Sun on Sand, Joshua Redman and Brooklyn Rider (Nonesuch, 2019)
