= Jacob's Ladder (Brad Mehldau album) =

Studio album by Brad Mehldau
- Released: March 18, 2022
- Recorded: April 2020 – January 2021
- Studio: The Bunker Studios, Brooklyn; Power Sound Studios, Amsterdam; various others
- Length: 70:09
- Label: Nonesuch
- Producer: Brad Mehldau, John Davis

Brad Mehldau chronology
Your Mother Should Know: Brad Mehldau Plays The Beatles (2020)	Jacob's Ladder (2020–2021)	The Folly of Desire (2022)

Jacob's Ladder is an album by Brad Mehldau. It was recorded in 2020 and 2021 and released by Nonesuch Records in 2022.

== Music and recording ==
The album was recorded between April 2020 and January 2021, mainly at The Bunker Studios, Brooklyn, and Power Sound Studios in Amsterdam, but with contributions from Mark Guiliana, Becca Stevens, Safia McKinney-Askeur, and Timothy Hill recorded elsewhere. It was produced by Mehldau and John Davis.

"The book of Genesis story about Jacob's dream of a ladder leading up to heaven during a flight from his brother Esau provides the inspirational thrust for the album." There are two three-part suites: "Cogs in Cogs", based on Gentle Giant's piece from their The Power and the Glory album; and "Jacob's Ladder". For "Maybe As His Skies Are Wide", Mehldau transposed a line from Rush's 1981 track "Tom Sawyer" to a child's vocal pitch.

Mehldau explained, "The musical conduit on the record is prog. Prog – progressive rock – was the music of my childhood before I discovered jazz. It was my gateway to the fusion of Miles Davis, Weather Report, Mahavishnu Orchestra and other groups, which in turn was the gateway to more jazz. The prog from Rush, Gentle Giant, and Emerson, Lake and Palmer… These bands and others have continued to influence newer groups that bring prog impulses into the arena of hard rock and screaming math metal, like Periphery, whose music is included here” and inspired the screaming vocals on album track ‘Herr und Knecht’."

== Release and reception ==
Professional ratings
Aggregate scores
Source	Rating
Metacritic	74/100
Review scores
Source	Rating
AllMusic	3.5/5 stars
The Daily Telegraph	3/5 stars
DownBeat	3/5 stars
The Guardian	4/5 stars
Jazzwise	4/5 stars
Mojo	4/5 stars
PopMatters	6/10
Tom Hull	B

Jacob's Ladder was released digitally and on CD by Nonesuch Records on March 18, 2022, followed by vinyl on June 17 that year.

Reviewers commented on the presence of prog-rock and Christian Scripture influences in the album. The JazzTimes reviewer wrote: "Prog’s conceptualism pairs well with the multiple directions Mehldau pursues in this incredible work of modern spiritual reflection". For John Fordham, the "panoramic soundscape, storyteller's control of dynamics, and canny use of guest players [...] show how far Mehldau has come as a sophisticated manipulator of complex materials". Ivan Hewett writing for The Daily Telegraph commented, "As always with Mehldau ambition often tips over into pretentiousness, but one forgives him because there’s a real musical sensibility at work. When complication drops away towards the close, signalling a return to primal innocence, we catch a glimpse of that sensibility in some beautifully simple piano improvisations. If only we could have had more of those." John Garratt of PopMatters added, "If one were to disregard the heavy-handed preaching, they would find a prog jazz album that is, if not necessarily uneven in quality, uneven in temperament. It makes for an eclectic mix but could potentially wreak havoc on an unsuspecting listener just looking for another jubilant crossover release. Best to know where you stand first."

== Track listing ==
1. "Maybe As His Skies Are Wide" (Alex Lifeson, Geddy Lee, Neil Peart, Pye Dubois) – 3:43
2. "Herr und Knecht" (Brad Mehldau) – 7:48
3. "(Entr'acte) Glam Perfume" (Mehldau) – 5:45
4. "Cogs in Cogs, Pt. I: Dance" (Derek Shulman, Kerry Minnear, Ray Shulman) – 4:11
5. "Cogs in Cogs, Pt. II: Song" (Derek Shulman, Minnear, Ray Shulman) – 4:02
6. "Cogs in Cogs, Pt. III: Double Fugue" (Derek Shulman, Minnear, Ray Shulman) – 4:31
7. "Tom Sawyer" (Lifeson, Lee, Peart, Dubois) – 7:44
8. "Vou correndo te encontrar / Racecar" (Alexander Bois, Casey Sabol, Jake Bowen, Matthew Halpern, Misha Mansoor, Spencer Sotelo, Thomas Murphy) – 5:05
9. "Jacob's Ladder, Pt. I: Liturgy" (Mehldau) – 1:27
10. "Jacob's Ladder, Pt. II: Song" (Lee - Lifeson - Peart) – 11:30
11. "Jacob's Ladder, Pt. III: Ladder" (Mehldau) – 4:19
12. "Heaven: I. All Once — II. Life Seeker (Chris Squire) — III. Würm (Steve Howe) — IV. Epilogue: It Was a Dream but I Carry It Still" (Mehldau) – 10:07

== Personnel ==
- Brad Mehldau – assorted keyboard instruments, assorted percussion, vocals, samples
- Luca van den Bossche – vocals (1, 7, 9, 11, 12)
- Mark Guiliana – drums (1, 2, 5, 7, 10, 12)
- John Davis – Elektron Octatrack (1), drum programming (4, 5, 7)
- Joel Frahm – soprano saxophone (2, 7), tenor saxophone (7)
- Tobias Bader – vocals (2)
- Becca Stevens – vocals (2, 3, 5, 9, 11, 12)
- Tinkerbell – vocals (2, 8)
- Lavinia Meijer – harp (3, 12)
- Motomi Igrashi-de Jong – lirone (5, 10)
- Chris Thile – vocals and mandolin (7)
- Pedro Martins – vocals (8), guitar (8, 12)
- Safia McKinney-Askeur – vocals (9–12)
- Timothy Hill – vocals (9), bass (11)
- Damien Mehldau – vocals (9)
- Joris Roelofs – bass clarinet (11)
- Fleurine – vocals (11)
- Cécile McLorin Salvant – vocals (12)
- Paul Pouwer – bass drum (12)
