= Where Do You Start =

Studio album by Brad Mehldau Trio
- Released: September 17, 2012
- Recorded: November 17, 2008 and April 19, 2011
- Studio: Avatar (New York, New York)
- Genre: Jazz
- Length: 78:22
- Label: Nonesuch; 7559-79610 5
- Producer: Brad Mehldau

Brad Mehldau chronology
Ode (2012)	Where Do You Start (2012)	Nearness (2016)

Where Do You Start is an album by the Brad Mehldau Trio released on the Nonesuch label in 2012.

== Reception ==
Professional ratings
Aggregate scores
Source	Rating
Metacritic	80/100
Review scores
Source	Rating
All About Jazz	4.5/5 stars
AllMusic	3.5/5 stars
Financial Times	5/5 stars
The Guardian	4/5 stars
Jazz Forum	5/5 stars
Jazzwise	4/5 stars
Mojo	3/5 stars
musicOMH	4/5 stars
Tom Hull	A−
Q	4/5 stars

The album received generally favourable reviews with Metacritic giving it a score of 80% from 7 reviews. AllMusic awarded the album 3½ stars and in its review by Matt Collar, states "Ultimately, Where Do You Start is an intimate, impressionistic, and probing release that should certainly appeal to longtime fans of Mehldau's nuanced jazz style". The Guardian's John Fordham observed "the dynamics and empathy of this ensemble remain pretty irresistible". On All About Jazz, John Kelman noted "Where Do You Start isn't so much an alternative as it is further evidence—as if any were needed—of this tremendous trio's ability to take any material—old, new, borrowed or original—and make it firmly its own".

BBC Music reviewer, Martin Longley commented "Where Do You Start revives the old Mehldau approach of covering songs from across the decades... Yet Mehldau’s method is so dominant that everything gravitates towards the trio’s signature sound, lending cohesion to a variegated crop... It all points to Mehldau entering a new prime phase in his career, both onstage and in the recording studio". Phil Johnson of The Independent added, "There's not a duff track or dull moment in this 75 minutes of studio material..."

== Track listing ==
1. "Got Me Wrong" (Jerry Cantrell) - 5:24
2. "Holland" (Sufjan Stevens) - 8:46
3. "Brownie Speaks" (Clifford Brown) - 8:13
4. "Baby Plays Around" (Cait O'Riordan, Elvis Costello) - 10:07
5. "Airegin" (Sonny Rollins) - 6:23
6. "Hey Joe" (Billy Roberts) - 6:24
7. "Samba e Amor" (Chico Buarque) - 9:02
8. "Jam" (Brad Mehldau) - 5:26
9. "Time Has Told Me" (Nick Drake) - 8:30
10. "Aquelas Coisas Todas" (Toninho Horta) - 6:01
11. "Where Do You Start?" (Marilyn Bergman, Alan Bergman, Johnny Mandel) - 4:06

== Personnel ==
- Brad Mehldau – piano
- Larry Grenadier – bass
- Jeff Ballard – drums
