= Joel Frahm =

American jazz saxophonist

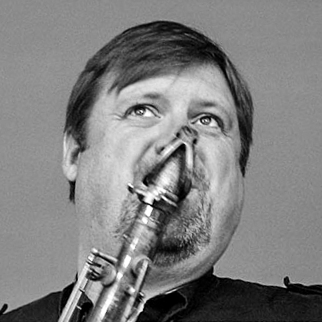
- Frahm in 2013

Background information
- Born: Racine, Wisconsin, U.S.
- Genres: Jazz; Neo-bop; avant-garde jazz
- Occupation: Musician
- Instrument: Saxophone
- Years active: 1988–present

Joel Frahm (born 1970 (Note: A request to change this to 1969 has been submitted to AllMusic)) is an American jazz saxophonist.

== Early life ==
Frahm was born in Racine, Wisconsin, in 1970. (Note: A request to change this to 1969 has been submitted to AllMusic) He attended the Stephen Bull Fine Arts School, where he began playing the tenor saxophone. At the age of 15 he and his family moved to West Hartford, Connecticut, where he attended William H. Hall High School. He met pianist Brad Mehldau at school, and the two had weekly gigs locally. Frahm attended Rutgers University for a year after leaving high school in 1988 and eventually transferred to The Manhattan School of Music, where he graduated with a Bachelor of Arts degree in Jazz Performance.

Frahm lists saxophonists John Coltrane, Stan Getz and Chris Potter as influences.

== Later life and career ==
His debut recording as a leader was Sorry, No Decaf, for Palmetto Records, in 1998. A 2001 recording, Don't Explain, was a series of duets with Mehldau.

== Discography ==
=== As leader/co-leader ===
- Sorry, No Decaf (Palmetto, 1998)
- The Navigator (Palmetto, 2000)
- Don't Explain (Palmetto, 2001)
- We Used to Dance (Anzic, 2005)
- With Bruce Katz, Project A. (Anzic, 2009)
- Caminhos Cruzados (Venus, 2010)
- Live at Smalls (Smallslive, 2011)
- With Pavel Wlosok Trio, Czechmate (New Port Line, 2013)
- With Johannes Mössinger, New by Two (Unit, 2017)

=== As sideman ===
With Omer Avital

- Live at Smalls (2010)
- New Song (2014)

With Brad Mehldau

- Finding Gabriel (Nonesuch, 2019)
- Jacob's Ladder (Nonesuch, 2020–2021)

==== With Adi Meyerson ====
- Where We Stand (Independent, 2018)

=== As invited soloist ===
With Sant Andreu Jazz Band, Barcelona

- Jazzing 6 Vol. 1+2, Temps (2016))
