= Bob Donnelly =

Bob Donnelly is an American entertainment lawyer who has represented clients including Esperanza Spalding, Bootsy Collins, the creators of Woodstock, and many more. Donnelly has been awarded 41 platinum albums. He has acted as in-house legal counsel for Leber-Krebs, who managed the careers of Aerosmith, AC/DC, and Def Leppard. In 2004 Donnelly and Dan Coleman launched Modern Works Music Publishing, an independent music publishing administration company whose initial clients were John Legend and his co-writers.

Modern Works' catalog includes evergreen classics such as Erroll Garner's 'Misty,' Bootsy Collins’ “Flashlight” and “I’d Rather Be with You,” Julie Gold's “From a Distance” (made famous by Bette Midler and Nanci Griffith), Herbie Hancock’s “Rockit” (co-written by Michael Beinhorn), Jonathan Edwards’ protest classic “Sunshine,” and Skee-Lo's Top 10 rap “I Wish.” Modern Works is the publishing administrator for Second Floor Music, whose catalog contains standards such as “Bemsha Swing” by Thelonious Monk & Denzil Best, Bobby Timmons’ “Moanin'”, Clifford Brown's “Joy Spring”.

Donnelly took a lead role in repealing the pro-record company/anti-artist "Works-for-Hire" bill, and also was given credit from Attorney General Eliot Spitzer for bringing the "suspense account case" which resulted in the payment of $55 million in back-due royalties to artists. Donnelly was the first lawyer to do a superstar endorsement deal when he put Blondie's Deborah Harry into a pair of Murjani jeans. Other endorsement clients have included Sir Elton John, Reggie Jackson, and Michael Jackson.

His awards within the industry include two special recognition awards from the Volunteer Lawyers for the Arts and from St. John’s Law School Entertainment Law Society. Bob has repeatedly been included on Irish America Magazine’s Legal 100, one of the most distinguished lawyers in the United States of Irish American descent and he is listed in the WHO’S WHO IN ENTERTAINMENT.
