= Worcester Five Cents Savings Bank =

- U.S. National Register of Historic Places
- U.S. Historic district – Contributing property
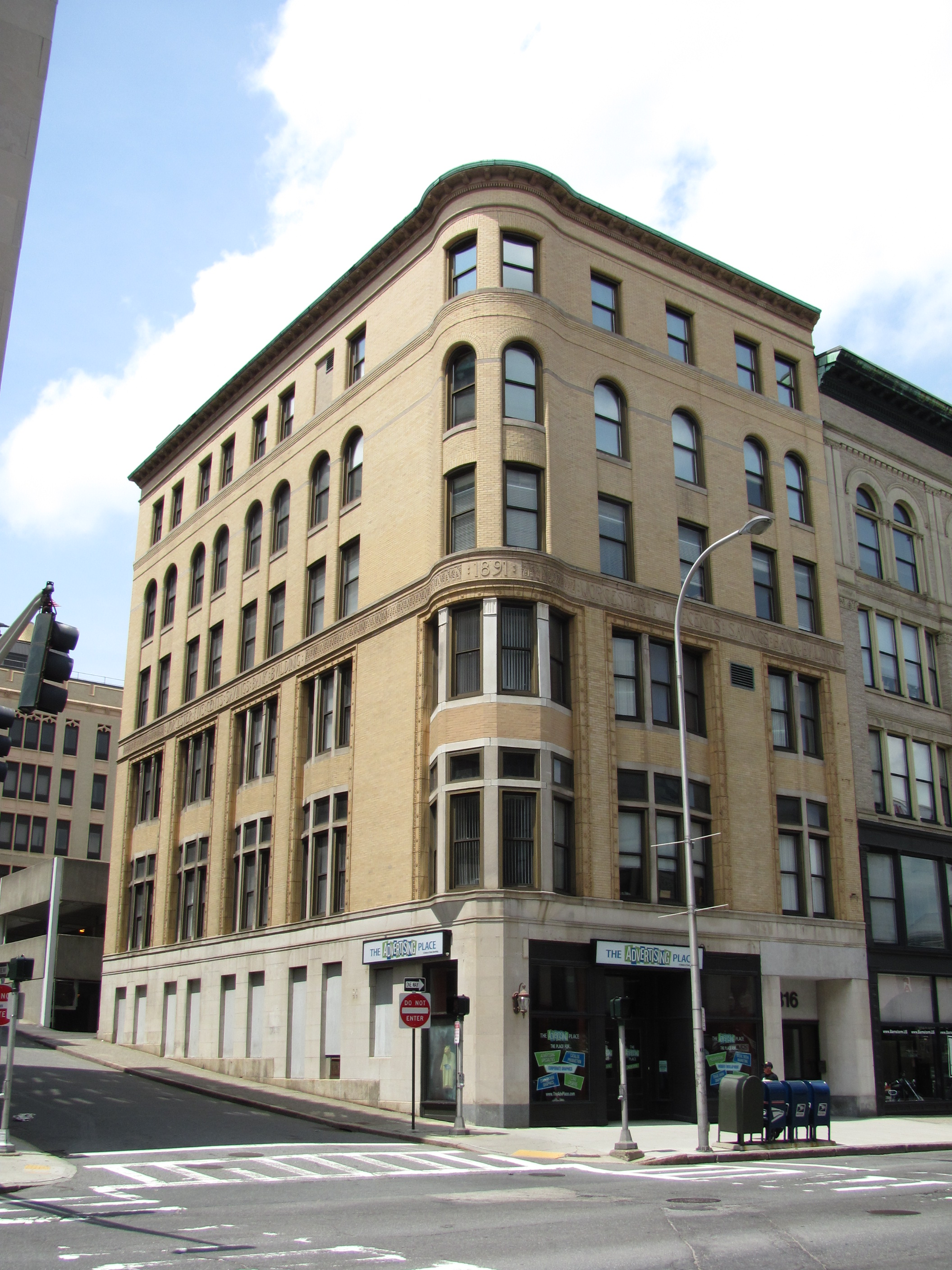
- Worcester Five Cents Savings Bank

- Location within Massachusetts Location within the United States
- Location: 316 Main St., Worcester, Massachusetts
- Coordinates: 42°15′57″N 71°48′8″W
- Area: less than one acre
- Built: 1891
- Architect: Stephen C. Earle
- Architectural style: Romanesque
- Part of: Mechanics' Hall District (ID80000577)
- NRHP reference No.: 78000472

Significant dates
- Added to NRHP: September 13, 1978
- Designated CP: March 5, 1980

The Worcester Five Cents Savings Bank is a historic bank building at 316 Main Street in Worcester, Massachusetts. The six story Romanesque Revival building was constructed in 1891 to a design by Stephen Earle. The building is unusual in downtown Worcester for its use of limestone and buff brick, and for its rounded corner bay. The building originally had plate glass and iron store fronts on its ground floor (the bank occupying the second floor), but this was redone in matching limestone sometime after 1949.

THe Worcester Five Cents Savings Bank was founded in 1854 by Reverend Edward Everett Hale and others, and originally conducted business out of the bookstore owned by its first treasurer. When the institution had this building built, it first occupied the second story, while leasing the ground floor to the Quinsigamond Bank. The latter failed in 1902, and the bank then took over the ground floor as well. By 1953 it had expanded to occupy the entire building. The bank was merged into the Bank of New England in 1988.

The building was listed on the National Register of Historic Places in 1978, and was included in the Mechanics' Hall District in 1980. Some of its interior features, particularly the fine finishings of its original banking hall, have been covered over or lost. It served as the corporate headquarters of Chess King during the 1980s. In 2023 it was purchased as the future headquarters of Cunningham & Associates, a National Speciality Tax and Consulting Firm.

== See also ==
- National Register of Historic Places listings in northwestern Worcester, Massachusetts
- National Register of Historic Places listings in Worcester County, Massachusetts
