= Mark Guiliana =

American drummer

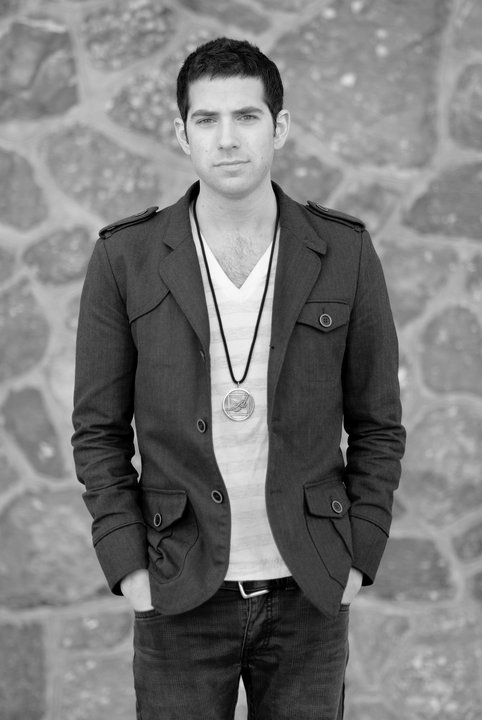

Background information
- Born: September 2, 1980 (age 46); Florham Park, New Jersey, U.S.
- Genres: Jazz; rock; indie rock
- Instrument: Drums

Mark Guiliana (born September 2, 1980) is an American drummer, composer and leader of the band Beat Music. He has played with Avishai Cohen, Brad Mehldau, David Bowie, Meshell Ndegeocello, Gretchen Parlato, Jason Lindner, Lionel Loueke, Dhafer Youssef, Tigran Hamasyan, Matisyahu, St. Vincent, the European piano trio Phronesis and his own groups, Heernt and the Mark Guiliana Jazz Quartet.

== Biography ==
Guiliana was born and raised in New Jersey, and attended William Paterson University, where he graduated in 2003 with a degree in Jazz Studies and Performance.

Mark Guiliana is a drummer, composer, educator, producer and founder of Beat Music Productions, through which he released My Life Starts Now and Beat Music: The Los Angeles Improvisations as a bandleader.

His conceptual approach to the instrument is also featured in Mehliana, the electric duo featuring Brad Mehldau on keyboards and synthesizers. The group's debut album, Taming the Dragon (Nonesuch), was released in early 2014.

Guiliana's extensive touring has taken him across six continents with artists including Meshell Ndegeocello, Gretchen Parlato, Avishai Cohen, Matisyahu, Lionel Loueke, Now vs. Now, Dhafer Youssef, Beat Music and Heernt. He has also appeared on over 30 recordings to date, including Blackstar, David Bowie's final album.

Guiliana was described by The New York Times as "a drummer around whom a cult of admiration has formed," while Time Out wrote, "What happens when you add hard bop drum masters Elvin Jones and Art Blakey to a 1980s Roland 808 drum machine, divide the result by J Dilla and then multiply to the power of Squarepusher? Answer: Mark Guiliana."

== Awards and honors ==
- 2016: DownBeat magazine: "25 for the Future"
- 2024: Nominated for 67th Annual Grammy Awards: Best Contemporary Instrumental Album for Mark.

== Discography ==
=== As leader/co-leader ===
- EP (2010)
- Beat Music (2012)
- A Form of Truth (2013)
- BEAT MUSIC The Los Angeles Improvisations (2014)
- My Life Starts Now (2014)
- Family First (2015)
- Jersey (2017)
- Beat Music! Beat Music! Beat Music! (2019)
- Music for Doing (2022)
- The Sound of Listening (2022)
- Mischief (2023)
- MARK (2024)
- questions (volume one) (2025)

As Heernt

- Locked in a Basement (Razdaz Recordz, 2006) recorded in 2005

With Brad Mehldau

- Mehliana: Taming the Dragon (Nonesuch, 2014)

=== As sideman ===
With David Bowie

- Nothing Has Changed, "Sue (Or in a Season of Crime)" (2014)
- Blackstar (2016)
- No Plan (EP) (2017)

With Matt Cameron

- Cavedweller (2017)

With Avishai Cohen

- Lyla (2003)
- At Home (Avishai Cohen album)|At Home (2004)
- Continuo (2006)
- As is...Live at the Blue Note (2007)
- Gently Disturbed (2008)
- Sha'ot Regishot (2008)

With Dave Douglas

- High Risk (Greenleaf, 2015)
- Dark Territory (Greenleaf, 2016)

With Aaron Dugan

- Theory of Everything (2010)

With Janek Gwizdala

- It Only Happens Once (2012)

With Dumpster Hunter

- Frustration in Time Travel (2013)

With Jason Lindner ("Now VS Now")

- Now VS Now (2009)
- Earth Analog (2013)

With Lionel Loueke

- Heritage (2012)
- Lean In (2023)

With Matisyahu

- Akeda (2014)

With Donny McCaslin

- Perpetual Motion (2011)
- Casting for Gravity (2012)
- Fast Future (2014)
- Beyond Now (2016)

With Brad Mehldau

- Finding Gabriel (Nonesuch, 2019)
- Jacob's Ladder (Nonesuch, 2020–2021)

With Chris Morrissey

- North Hero (2013)

With Gretchen Parlato

- Live in NYC (2013)

With Phronesis

- Alive (2010)

With Brad Shepik

- Across the Way (2011)
- Mob of Unruly Angels (2010)

With Young Astronauts Club

- Montréal (Mark Guiliana Mixes) (2015)

With Dhafer Youssef

- Abu Nawas Rhapsody (2010)

With Daniel Zamir

- Song for Comfort (2012)
