= Mechanics' Hall District =

Historic district in Massachusetts, United States

- U.S. National Register of Historic Places
- U.S. Historic district
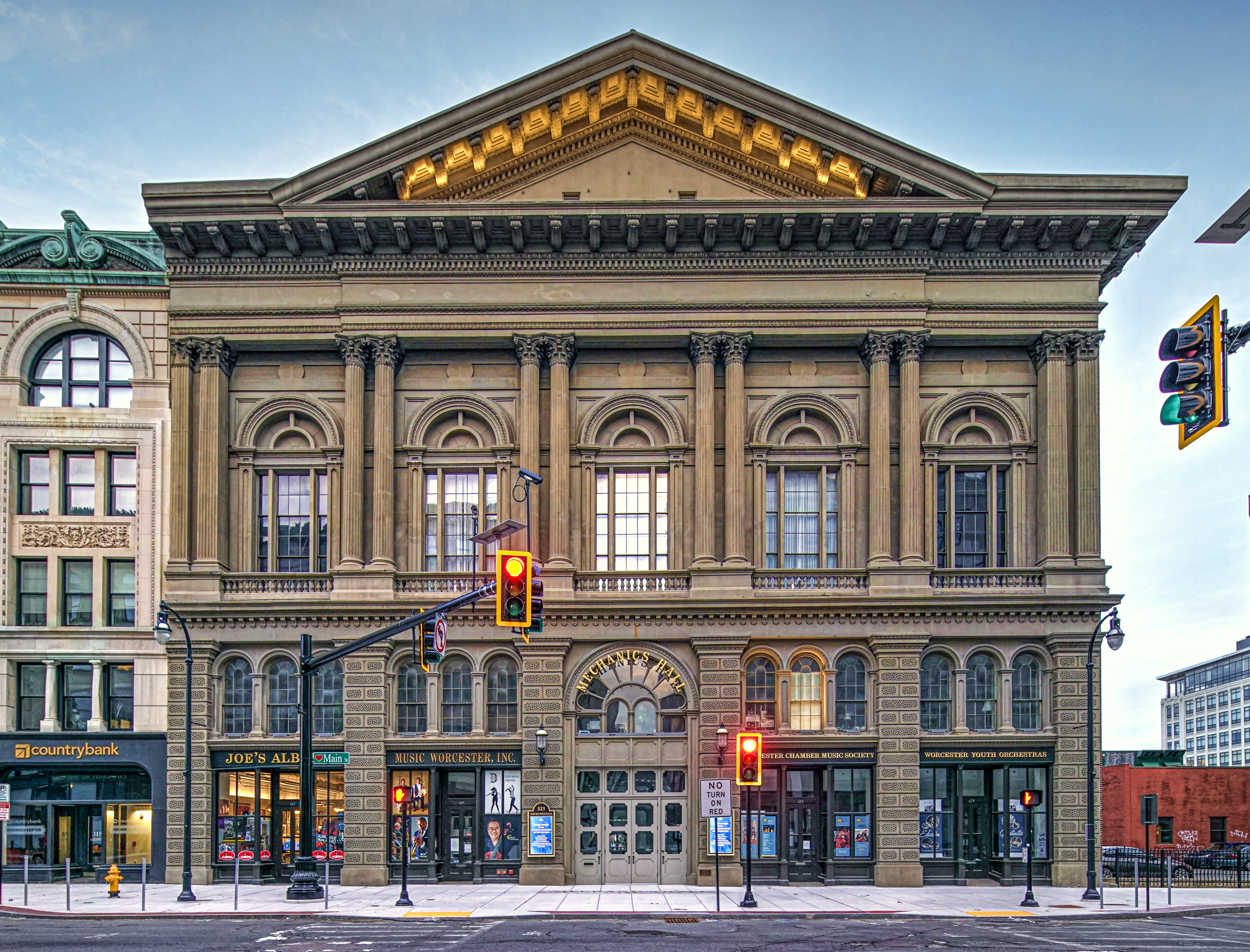
- Mechanics Hall

- Location within Massachusetts Location within the United States
- Location: Properties between 282 and 343 Main St., Worcester, Massachusetts
- Coordinates: 42°15′56″N 71°48′8″W
- Built: 1854
- Architect: Boyden, Elbridge; Et al.
- Architectural style: Renaissance, Italianate, Romanesque
- MPS: Worcester MRA
- NRHP reference No.: 80000577
- Added to NRHP: March 05, 1980

The Mechanics' Hall District is a historic district encompassing a city block of downtown Worcester, Massachusetts, United States that preserves its late 19th-century appearance. It is located on Main Street between Exchange and Foster Streets, and includes the Worcester Five Cents Savings Bank building and Mechanics Hall. It was added to the National Register of Historic Places in 1980.

== Description and history ==
The Mechanics' Hall District is located on the north side of Worcester's downtown, west of the DCU Center and north of City Hall. It consists of eight buildings on both sides of Main Street, between Exchange and Foster Streets to the east, and Sudbury and Maple Streets to the west. The eponymous Mechanics Hall is located roughly in the center of the east side of this area; it is an Italianate structure built in 1857 to a design by Worcester architect Elbridge Boyden, and is one of the city's cultural centers. To its north is the large Central Exchange Building, constructed in 1895-96 with later Renaissance Revival styling. South of Mechanics Hall is a vacant lot, beyond which is the Burnside Building, built in 1886-87 to a design by Boston architects Bradlee, Winslow & Wetherell.

The block opposite Mechanics Hall is taken up by five buildings, all of which are historically significant. The northern end is anchored by the Flagg Building (1854), one of the city's best-preserved Italianate office buildings, with the 1897-1906 Day Building adjacent. South of these is the 1891 Worcester Five Cents Savings Bank building, designed by Worcester architect Stephen Earle, and the 1925 Classical Revival Central Building. The district's southern end is the former State Street Mutual building, built in 1894-97; it is considered to be the city's first formal skyscraper, with a steel frame and Romanesque exterior.

A much larger stretch of Worcester's Main Street was one lined with a series of connected commercial buildings similar to this block. Urban renewal has taken its toll on the larger area, and this block is now one of the few that retains a significant concentration of high quality late 19th-century architecture.

== See also ==
- National Register of Historic Places listings in northwestern Worcester, Massachusetts
- National Register of Historic Places listings in Worcester County, Massachusetts
