= Finding Gabriel =

Studio album by Brad Mehldau
- Released: May 17, 2019
- Recorded: March 2017 – October 2018
- Studios: Bunker Studios, New York City
- Length: 55:33
- Label: Nonesuch
- Producer: Brad Mehldau

Brad Mehldau chronology
| After Bach (2017) | Finding Gabriel (2017–18) | Suite: April 2020 (2020) |

Finding Gabriel is an album by Brad Mehldau. It was recorded over an 18-month period in 2017–18 and was released by Nonesuch Records in 2019. It won the 2019 Grammy Award for Best Jazz Instrumental Album.

== Background ==
Mehldau wrote that "Finding Gabriel came after reading the Bible closely for the last several years. [...] The Bible felt like a corollary and perhaps a guide to the present day – one long nightmare or a signpost leading to potential gnosis, depending on how you read it."

== Music and recording ==
The album was recorded and mixed by John Davis at Bunker Studios, Brooklyn, between March 2017 and October 2018. Mehldau was also the album's producer.

"St Mark Is Howling in the City of Night" contains "strident drums and classical modernism". During "The Prophet Is a Fool" (the title is from Hosea 9.7), the opening line is "Let's get out of here and head for the hills", which a prophet responds to with "build that wall". The track is a condemnation of US President Donald Trump. The title track is played entirely by Mehldau on various instruments, with a plea for understanding responded to with part of Daniel 9.23: "Consider the word and understand the vision".

== Release and reception ==
Professional ratings
Review scores
| Source | Rating |
|---|---|
| All About Jazz | 4/5 stars |
| AllMusic | 4/5 stars |
| DownBeat | 4/5 stars |
| Financial Times | 3/5 stars |
| Jazz Journal | 4.5/5 stars |
| Laut.de | 4/5 stars |
| PopMatters | 6/10 |
| Spectrum Culture | 3.75/5 |
| The Times | 5/5 stars |
| Tom Hull | B |

Finding Gabriel was released by Nonesuch Records on May 17, 2019. The AllMusic reviewer wrote: "It will take several listens to appreciate all that takes place on Finding Gabriel, but that's as it should be" The Financial Times reviewer pointed out that the tracks had been built in layers, suggested that the "wordless vocals, however, are a layer too far", but praised "Kurt Elling soaring majestically on 'Make it All Go Away' [and] Becca Stevens pure-toned and melancholy on 'Deep Water'".

Critic Nate Chinen indicated that the album added a new element to Mehldau's music: "Mehldau has always been concerned with balancing a handful of musical priorities: dynamic fluctuation, tension and release, the play between a crisply stated idea and one that's projected or implied. All of these are factors on Finding Gabriel, Mehldau's ambitious new album. What helps nudge it into strange new territory is a fixation on voice and breath." Ted Panken also noted novelty in the use of vocals: "One groundbreaking element of Finding Gabriel is the way Mehldau deploys Elling, Kahane and Stevens not as interpreters of the texts in question, but as discrete instruments possessing distinctive timbral properties". Panken described the album as "beyond category". Jackson Sinnenberg writing for JazzTimes commented, "The specific political references can seem ham-handed at first, but they fit when one listens to them in the context of the record as a whole and understands them as inspirations for the composer’s vision." Shepherd Express's Michael Muchian mentioned, "Fans of Mehldau’s synthesizer work, especially, will enjoy the album, but even the mildly interested may want to give it a heartfelt listen." Matthew Kassel of DownBeat wrote, "One of [the] pianist's defining strengths is that he's capable of producing profound lines with a light and seemingly effortless touch. The album could have been a graceless offering, but in Mehldau’s capable hands, it works."

Nathan Stevens of Spectrum Culture commented "Finding Gabriel is a dangerous proposition. In the Torah, Bible and Quran, Archangel Gabriel comes to earth to deliver visions unto prophets. It gave apocalyptic sights to Daniel, forecasts the birth of Jesus Christ and proclaims Mohammed a prophet. And it seems to be pretty chummy with musicians too, with that trumpet of proclamation that blew on a Behemoth record and on a “Twilight Zone” episode. But for Brad Mehldau, he seems to accept he hasn’t found Gabriel. Instead, he’s desperately trying to delve into clairvoyance to get a better idea on just what the hell is happening in the 21st century. Finding Gabriel is an odd duck in the modern jazz canon, a deeply political album that speaks its ideals rarely, instead focusing on music that envelops." Chris Pearson of The Times added "Always somewhat cerebral, Brad Mehldau has entered especially intellectual territory lately. The American jazz pianist, one of the best alive, last year reworked Bach and in March unveiled his Piano Concerto at the Barbican. Now he takes on the Bible, using it as a prism through which to examine our present political turmoil. He plays an array of keyboards and deploys wordless voices and strings." Francis Graham-Dixon in his review for Jazz Journal noted, "This is a wonderful album, full of ambition, invention and packing an emotional punch."

The album peaked at No. 2 on the Billboard jazz albums chart. It won the 2019 Grammy Award for Best Jazz Instrumental Album.

== Track listing ==
1. "The Garden" – 7:18
2. "Born to Trouble" – 4:01
3. "Striving After Wind" – 4:38
4. "O Ephraim" – 5:21
5. "St. Mark Is Howling in the City of Night" – 6:20
6. "The Prophet Is a Fool" – 6:47
7. "Make It All Go Away" – 4:32
8. "Deep Water" – 5:13
9. "Proverb of Ashes" – 4:17
10. "Finding Gabriel" – 7:06

== Personnel ==
- Brad Mehldau – synthesizers (1–10), piano (1, 2, 5–10), Fender Rhodes (3, 4), Hammond B-3 organ (10), Musser Ampli-Celeste (4), Morfbeats gamelan strips (4), xylophone (6), Mellotron (10), drums (2, 4, 10), percussion (10), vocals (1, 2, 4, 5, 9, 10)
- Ambrose Akinmusire – trumpet (1, 6)
- Chris Cheek – baritone sax and tenor sax (1)
- Charles Pillow – baritone sax (6), alto sax and bass clarinet (1), soprano sax (1, 6)
- Joel Frahm – tenor sax (1, 6)
- Michael Thomas – alto sax and flute (1, 6)
- Sara Caswell – violin (5, 8)
- Lois Martin – viola (5, 8)
- Noah Hoffeld – cello (5, 8)
- Mark Guiliana – drums (1, 3, 5–9)
- Aaron Nevezie – effects (9)
- Kurt Elling – vocals (7, 9)
- Gabriel Kahane – vocals (1, 3, 5, 8)
- Becca Stevens – vocals (1, 3, 5, 7, 8)
- "Snorts" Malibu – vocals (9)

== Chart performance ==
| Chart (2019) | Peak position |
|---|---|
| Belgian Albums (Ultratop Flanders) | 76 |
| Belgian Albums (Ultratop Wallonia) | 166 |
| French Albums (SNEP) | 172 |
| Spanish Albums (Promusicae) | 91 |
