= Solid Jackson =

Studio album by MTB
- Released: November 29, 2024
- Recorded: November 25–26, 2023
- Studios: Samurai Hotel Recording Studio, New York City, New York
- Genre: Jazz
- Length: 53:56
- Label: Criss Cross
- Producer: Jerry Teekens

Brad Mehldau chronology
Après Fauré (2023)	Solid Jackson (2023)	Ride into the Sun (2025)

Solid Jackson is an album by MTB, a quintet consisting of Brad Mehldau (piano), Mark Turner (tenor sax), Peter Bernstein (guitar), Larry Grenadier (bass), and Bill Stewart (drums). It was recorded in 2023 and released by Criss Cross Jazz the following year.

== Background ==
The name "MTB" comes from the surnames of pianist Brad Mehldau, tenor saxophonist Mark Turner, and guitarist Peter Bernstein. Together with bassist Larry Grenadier and drummer Leon Parker, in 1994 they recorded the album Consenting Adults, which was released by Criss Cross Jazz in 2000. For Solid Jackson, Bill Stewart replaced Parker in the quintet.

== Music and recording ==
Solid Jackson was recorded by Mike Marciano at the Samurai Hotel Recording Studio, New York City, on November 25 and 26, 2023. Mehldau and Bernstein wrote two of the compositions each, Turner wrote one, with the remainder being from other saxophonists. The title track is a "blues named for a catchphrase of dedicatee Charlie Haden". "Maury's Grey Wig" and "Ode to Angela" are ballads; "Soft Impression" is "a minor bluesy number stamped with a Jazz Messengers imprint".

== Release and reception ==
The album was released on November 29, 2024, by Criss Cross Jazz. They stated that Elemental Music released a "limited gatefold edition on 180-gram virgin vinyl" on May 9, 2025. The Jazz Journal reviewer praised the audio quality and "how soloists throughout the album emerge from the quintet's natural ebb and flow". The UK Jazz News reviewer concluded: "MTB delivers a set that lives up to that [high] expectation and is bound to be on regular rotation for a huge number of jazz fans for a time to come." Sandro Cerini of Musica Jazz added: 'We are now dealing with acknowledged masters. This release is no longer a calling card or a statement of promise but rather a confirmation of an absolutely preeminent position, bordering on a brilliant divertissement."

== Track listing ==
1. "Solid Jackson" (Brad Mehldau) – 8:11
2. "The Things That Fall Away" (Peter Bernstein) – 5:59
3. "Angola" (Wayne Shorter) – 6:06
4. "Soft Impression" (Hank Mobley) – 5:59
5. "1946" (Mark Turner) – 8:09
6. "Maury's Grey Wig" (Mehldau) – 6:33
7. "Ditty for Dewey" (Bernstein) – 6:18
8. "Ode to Angela" (Harold Land) – 6:41

== Personnel ==
- Brad Mehldau – piano
- Mark Turner – tenor sax
- Peter Bernstein – guitar
- Larry Grenadier – bass
- Bill Stewart – drums
