= Ode (Brad Mehldau album) =

Studio album by Brad Mehldau
- Released: March 20, 2012
- Recorded: February 17, 2008 – April 19, 2011
- Studio: Avatar (New York, New York)
- Genre: Jazz
- Length: 75:22
- Label: Nonesuch Records
- Producer: Brad Mehldau

Brad Mehldau chronology
Modern Music (2010)	Ode (2012)	Where Do You Start (2012)

Ode is a contemporary jazz album by American pianist Brad Mehldau. It features Mehldau's regular trio partners, bassist Larry Grenadier and drummer Jeff Ballard. The album was released on March 20, 2012 by Nonesuch Records.

== Reception ==
Professional ratings
Aggregate scores
Source	Rating
Metacritic	85/100
Review scores
Source	Rating
All About Jazz	5/5 stars
AllMusic	4/5 stars
Blurt	4.5/5 stars
Down Beat	4.5/5 stars
Financial Times	5/5 stars
The Guardian	4/5 stars
Jazzwise	3/5 stars
Mojo	4/5 stars
musicOMH	4.5/5 stars
PopMatters	8/10 stars

The album received universal acclaim with Metacritic giving it a score of 85% from 10 reviews. AllMusic awarded the album 4 stars and in its review by Thom Jurek, states "As an album, Ode reveals just how far this group has traveled together these past seven years. More importantly, it provides an exciting glimpse of what may lie on their collective horizon". PopMatters reviewer Will Layman said "Ode itself does not reach for epic dimension often, and that’s cool. It seems less like a manifesto or a film than like a very fine jazz album. Though the leading jazz pianists today are making lots of impressive statements about where the music is going, maybe creating a compelling album, old school, is still one of the music's clearest callings. Ode fits the bill". The Observer's Dave Gelly commented "Mehldau is so brilliant at 'recomposing' standards that his remarkable talent as a composer is often overlooked. Now, for his trio's first studio album in more than six years, he comes up with 11 absorbing new pieces". BBC Music's Martin Longley enthused "All three players are articulating a ceaseless stream of fresh ideas throughout this electrically energised session". On All About Jazz, Ian Patterson noted "On Ode, Mehldau further refines the relationship between composed and improvised form, infusing improvisations with a melodic, pop-like simplicity. His continuing exploration of the art of the trio is one of the joys of the contemporary jazz panorama". JazzTimes reviewer Lloyd Sachs commented "Ode is the work of a trio that's firing on all cylinders while sounding like it's on cruise control".

== Track listing ==
All tracks are written by Brad Mehldau.

No.	Title	Length
1.	"M.B."	7:46
2.	"Ode"	6:20
3.	"26"	7:50
4.	"Dream Sketch"	7:25
5.	"Bee Blues"	6:42
6.	"Twiggy"	5:42
7.	"Kurt Vibe"	4:54
8.	"Stan the Man"	5:24
9.	"Wyatt's Eulogy for George Hanson"	9:23
10.	"Aquaman"	4:49
11.	"Days of Dilbert Delaney"	9:01
Total length:		75:22

== Personnel ==
- Brad Mehldau – piano
- Larry Grenadier – bass
- Jeff Ballard – drums
