= Scott Yoo =

American conductor and violinist

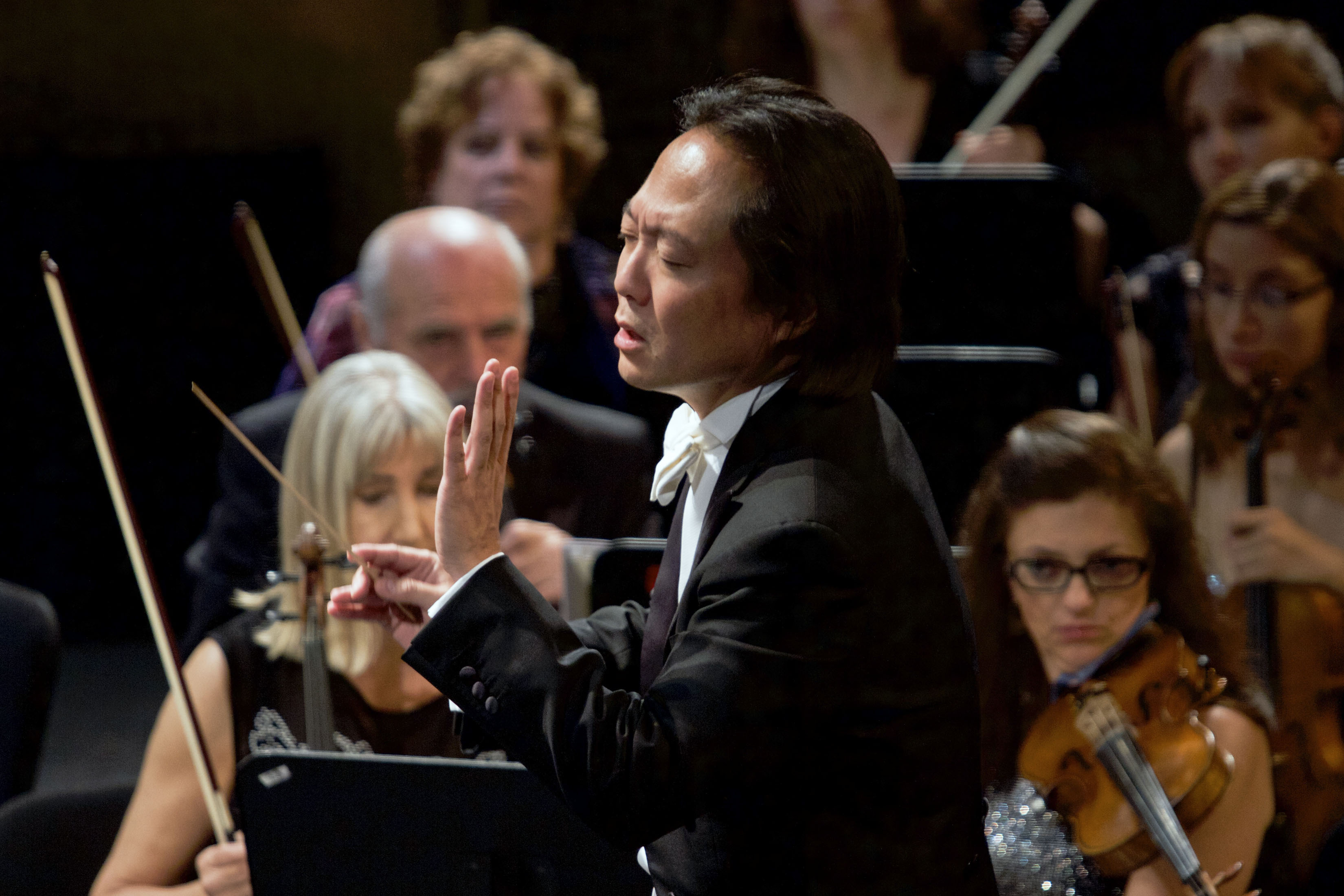
- Scott Yoo conducting Mexico City Philharmonic at its 38th Anniversary at Teatro de la Ciudad Esperanza Iris

Background information
- Born: April 25, 1971 (age 55); Tokyo, Japan
- Occupation: Conductor
- Instrument: Violin
- Website: scott-yoo.com

Scott Yoo (born April 25, 1971) is an American conductor and violinist. He was appointed chief conductor and artistic director of the Mexico City Philharmonic Orchestra in 2016. He hosts the PBS TV series Now Hear This.

== Early life ==
Yoo was born in Tokyo in 1971. His father was Korean and his mother Japanese.

Raised in Glastonbury, Connecticut, Yoo began studying the violin at age three and performed the Mendelssohn Violin Concerto with the Boston Symphony Orchestra at age 12. He studied with Dorothy DeLay and Paul Kantor at the Juilliard School and won the Josef Gingold International Violin Competition in Brazil. He enrolled at Harvard, where he studied physics after accidentally breaking his index finger.

== Career ==
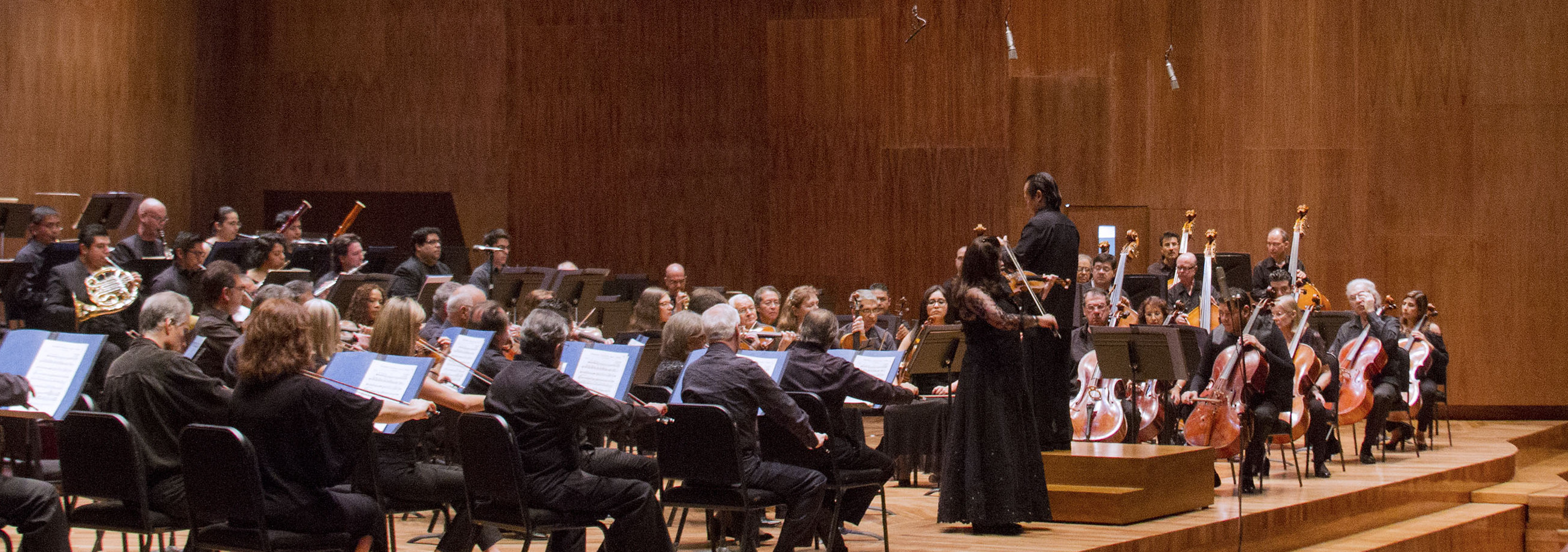
Scott Yoo conducting in 2018 with his orchestra and with violinist Erika Dobosiewicz

In 1994, Yoo participated in the founding of the Metamorphosen Chamber Orchestra, which he conducted at its subscription series at Jordan Hall in Boston and on tour. At age 26 he became assistant conductor of the Dallas Symphony Orchestra, and conducted the San Francisco Symphony, Colorado Symphony, Indianapolis Symphony, Utah Symphony, and New World Symphony. He conducted the Saint Paul Chamber Orchestra in its Elliott Carter Festival and in his Carnegie Hall debut. In Europe, he conducted the City of London Sinfonia, the Britten Sinfonia, Orchestre Philharmonique de Radio France, the Ensemble orchestral de Paris, Odense Symphony Orchestra, and the Estonian National Symphony Orchestra. In Asia, Yoo led the Yomiuri Nippon Symphony Orchestra in Tokyo and the Seoul Philharmonic Orchestra and Busan Philharmonic in Korea.

In 2002, Yoo became the conductor of the Colorado College Summer Music Festival, and in 2005, music director of the San Luis Obispo Mozart Festival, now called Festival Mozaic.

In 2011, he founded the Medellín Festicámara, bringing underprivileged musicians and international artists together in Medellín, Colombia.

In 2016, Yoo was elected the chief conductor of the Mexico City Philharmonic Orchestra.

Yoo has recorded for Bridge Records, New World, Naxos, and Sony Classical. In 2019, he recorded two cello concerto albums with the London Symphony Orchestra and Royal Scottish National Orchestra for Sony Music.

In 2021, Yoo received an honorary doctorate degree from Colorado College.

=== Now Hear This ===
In September 2019, Yoo became host and executive producer of Now Hear This, a television program presented by Great Performances, broadcast by the American public television network PBS. In 2021, the series was extended to a third season, which ran in the spring of 2022. Its fourth season aired in April 2023. The first season includes episodes about Vivaldi, Handel, Bach and Scarlatti, and the second season covers Haydn, Schubert, Mozart, and Beethoven. The third season focuses on American composers, including Amy Beach, Florence Price, Aaron Copland, and contemporary composers Reena Esmail and Sergio Assad. In the episode "Old Friends", Yoo and Yo-Yo Ma discussed their friendship. The fourth season has episodes on Astor Piazzolla and Argentine tango; Robert Schumann; contemporary composer Andy Akiho; and Isaac Albéniz. The fifth season includes:

- "Rising Stars" (April 12, 2024), which features violinist Chloe Chua performing Mozart's Violin Concerto No. 3.
- "Virtuosos" (April 19, 2024)
- "Old Friends" (April 26, 2024)
- "The Composer is Yoo" (May 3, 2024)

The sixth season includes:

- "Chopin's Polish Heart" (spring 2025), in which Yoo performs Nathan Milstein's violin transcription of Chopin's Nocturne in C-sharp minor, Op. posth.
- "Boccherini: Night Music" (spring 2025)
- "Rachmaninoff Reborn" (spring 2025)
- "Barrios: Chopin of the Guitar" (spring 2025)

Now Hear This was nominated for an Emmy Award in 2021 and 2023.

== Personal life ==
Yoo is married to flutist Alice Dade, a professor at the University of Missouri . She has appeared in several episodes of Now Hear This.

== Selected discography ==
- French Cello Concertos, Hee-Young Lim, London Symphony Orchestra, Sony Classical, London 2018
- Dvorak and Enesco Cello Concertos, Bion Tsang, Royal Scottish National Orchestra, Sony Classical, Glasgow 2018
- Earl Kim Orchestral Works, RTE National Symphony Orchestra, Naxos, Dublin 2004
- Earl Kim Chamber Music, Metamorphosen Chamber Orchestra, New World Records, Boston 2001
- Mark O’Connor American Seasons, Metamorphosen Chamber Orchestra, Sony Classical, Boston 2001
