= Ride into the Sun =

Studio album by Brad Mehldau
- Released: August 29, 2025
- Recorded: January 24–28, 2025
- Genres: Chamber pop; indie folk; jazz
- Length: 72:50
- Label: Nonesuch
- Producers: Brad Mehldau and Dan Coleman

Brad Mehldau chronology
Solid Jackson (2024)	Ride into the Sun (2025)

Ride into the Sun is a studio album by American jazz pianist Brad Mehldau. It was recorded in January 2025 and released in August. The album includes ten compositions by singer-songwriter Elliott Smith and four of Mehldau's own, which he says are "inspired by, and reflect, Smith's oeuvre". The title of the album was inspired by the lyrics to Smith's "Colorbars": "Everyone wants me to ride into the sun. But I ain't gonna go down, Laying low again, high on the sound."

== Reception ==
Frank Housh of All About Jazz wrote, "Ride into the Sun's 16 tracks are bursting with great music, love and respect. The album—like Smith's music, like life itself—is beautiful and sad." Jon Turney, writing for UK Jazz News, said, "If you know and like Smith's songs, I'm fairly sure you'll like this. If you care for Mehldau's work, and are curious about what inspires him, you’ll likely enjoy it too but perhaps, as I did, only intermittently." Ride into the Sun was nominated for a 2026 Grammy Award in the category of Best Alternative Jazz Album.

Professional ratings
Aggregate scores
Source	Rating
Metacritic	86/100
Review scores
Source	Rating
All About Jazz	4/5 stars
The Arts Desk	3/5 stars
Jazzwise	4/5 stars
Mojo	4/5 stars
PopMatters	9/10
Uncut	4/5 stars
Tom Hull	B

== Track listing ==
All tracks are written by Elliott Smith except where noted.

No.	Title	Writer(s)	Length
1.	"Better Be Quiet Now"		4:03
2.	"Everything Means Nothing to Me"		5:20
3.	"Tomorrow Tomorrow" (feat. Daniel Rossen)		4:03
4.	"Sweet Adeline"		3:22
5.	"Sweet Adeline Fantasy"	Mehldau	4:45
6.	"Between the Bars"		5:02
7.	"The White Lady Loves You More"		4:41
8.	"Ride into the Sun: Part I"	Mehldau	3:20
9.	"Thirteen"	Big Star (Chris Bell, Alex Chilton)	4:01
10.	"Everybody Cares, Everybody Understands"		4:02
11.	"Somebody Cares, Somebody Understands"	Mehldau	3:49
12.	"Southern Belle" (feat. Daniel Rossen)		3:53
13.	"Satellite"		3:53
14.	"Colorbars" (feat. Chris Thile)		5:24
15.	"Sunday"	Nick Drake	3:34
16.	"Ride into the Sun: Conclusion"	Mehldau	9:38
Total length:			72:50

== Personnel ==
- Brad Mehldau – piano, producer (all tracks)
- Daniel Rossen – acoustic guitar (3, 10, 12, 14, 16), lead vocals (3, 12), backing vocals (10), resonator guitar (12)
- Chris Thile – mandolin (3, 14), lead vocals (14), backing vocals (3)
- Felix Moseholm – acoustic bass (3, 6, 12, 14)
- John Davis – acoustic bass (1, 11), electric bass (2, 10, 15, 16), engineering, mixing
- Matt Chamberlain – drums (1–3, 6, 10–16), percussion (2, 13), screams (2)

Orchestra: (1–3, 7, 8, 10, 11, 15, 16)

- Dan Coleman – producer (all tracks), conductor (1, 2, 7, 8, 11, 15, 16)
- Jill Dell'Abate – contractor
- Jackie Thompson – copyist
- Jessica Han, Alex Sopp (flute solo on 15) – flute
- Agnes Marchione – clarinet
- Adrian Morejon – bassoon
- Eric Reed – horn
- Christina Courtin, Ellen DePasquale (violin solo on 1), Laura Frautschi, Joanna Maurer, Derek Ratzenboeck, Austin Wulliman – violin
- Mario Gotoh, Dov Scheindlin, Nadia Sirota – viola
- Michael Haas, Sophie Shao (cello solo on 16), Caitlin Sullivan – cello
- David Grossman – bass (orchestral)

== Charts ==
=== Weekly charts ===
Weekly chart performance for Ride into the Sun
Chart (2025)	Peak position
Belgian Albums (Ultratop Flanders)	185
Belgian Albums (Ultratop Wallonia)	194
Hungarian Physical Albums (MAHASZ)	9
Swiss Albums (Schweizer Hitparade)	19

=== Monthly charts ===
Monthly chart performance for Ride into the Sun
Chart (2025)	Peak position
German Jazz Albums (Offizielle Top 100)	4
