= The Folly of Desire =

Studio album by Brad Mehldau, Ian Bostridge
- Released: 2 June 2023
- Recorded: July 2022
- Studio: Alpheton New Maltings
- Length: 67:46
- Label: Pentatone
- Producer: Mark Brown

Brad Mehldau chronology
Jacob's Ladder (2022)	The Folly of Desire (2022)	After Bach II (2017–23)

Professional ratings
Review scores
Source	Rating
AllMusic	3.5/5 stars
Financial Times	4/5 stars
Tom Hull	B−

The Folly of Desire is a collaborative album by American jazz pianist Brad Mehldau and British tenor Ian Bostridge. It was recorded in July 2022 and released by Pentatone on 2 June 2023.

== Track listing ==
All tracks are written by Brad Mehldau except where noted.

No.	Title	Writer(s)	Length
1.	"The Sick Rose"		1:42
2.	"Leda and the Swan"		4:17
3.	"Sonnet 147"		2:55
4.	"Sonnet 75"		2:49
5.	"Über die Verführung von Engeln"		3:14
6.	"Ganymede I"		6:27
7.	"Ganymede II"		3:28
8.	"The Boys I Mean Are Not Refined"		4:50
9.	"Sailing to Byzantium"		2:22
10.	"Night II"		6:41
11.	"Lullaby"		7:54
12.	"These Foolish Things"	Eric Maschwitz, Jack Strachey	5:12
13.	"In the Wee Small Hours of the Morning"	Bob Hilliard, David Mann	3:08
14.	"Every Time We Say Goodbye"	Cole Porter	5:05
15.	"Nacht und Träume, D 827"	Franz Schubert	3:47
16.	"Night and Day"	Cole Porter	3:55
Total length:			67:46

== Personnel ==
- Brad Mehldau – piano, composing, liner notes
- Ian Bostridge – tenor (vocal), liner notes
