= Beat Music! Beat Music! Beat Music! =

Studio album by Mark Guiliana
- Released: April 12, 2019
- Label: Motéma

Beat Music! Beat Music! Beat Music! is a studio album by Mark Guiliana, released April 12, 2019 on Motéma Music. The album received a Grammy Award nomination for Best Contemporary Instrumental Album.
