= Love Songs (Anne Sofie von Otter and Brad Mehldau album) =

Studio album by Anne Sofie von Otter, Brad Mehldau
- Released: November 1, 2010
- Recorded: June 2010
- Venue: Berwaldhallen (Stockholm)
- Genre: Nouvelle chanson
- Length: 79:25
- Label: Naïve
- Producer: Jean-Pierre Loisil

Anne Sofie von Otter chronology
Terezín - Theresienstadt (2007)	Love Songs (2010)	Douce France (2013)

Brad Mehldau chronology
Highway Rider (2009)	Love Songs (2009)	Modern Music (2010)

Love Songs is an album by the mezzo-soprano Anne Sofie von Otter and the pianist Brad Mehldau.

== Background ==
Carnegie Hall awarded Mehldau a commission to write the song cycle Love Songs for von Otter; they premiered it together in 2009. His music is for love poems – five by Sara Teasdale, and one each by Philip Larkin and E. E. Cummings.

== Music and recording ==
The double album is in two parts: a seven-song cycle written by Mehldau; and songs by Jacques Brel, Michel Legrand, Joni Mitchell, Lennon and McCartney and others, sung in various languages.

== Release and reception ==
Professional ratings
Review scores
Source	Rating
AllMusic	4.5/5 stars
Financial Times	5/5 stars
The Guardian	4/5 stars
Tom Hull	B+

Love Songs was released by Naïve Records on November 1, 2010. The BBC reviewer commented that "Von Otter's performances emphasise vocal purity over the content of the verses, giving them a chilly beauty". The AllMusic reviewer's opinion was that von Otter's "tone is full and pure, and her investment in the songs is absolute. Mehldau's exceptionally sensitive and inventive accompaniments contribute immeasurably to the success of the album."

== Track listing ==
Disc 1

1. "It May Not Always Be So"
2. "We Met at the End of the Party"
3. "Child, Child"
4. "Twilight"
5. "Because"
6. "Dreams"
7. "Did You Never Know?"

Disc 2

1. "Avec Le Temps"
2. "Pierre"
3. "Marcie"
4. "Something Good"
5. "Chanson De Maxence"
6. "Chanson Des Viueux Amants"
7. "Sakta Vi Ga Genom Stan"
8. "Att Angora En Brygga"
9. "Dis, Quand Reviendras-Tu?"
10. "What Are You Doing the Rest of Your Life?"
11. "Calling You"
12. "Blackbird"
13. "Some Other Time"

== Personnel ==
- Anne Sofie von Otter – vocals
- Brad Mehldau – piano
