= Walking Shadows =

Studio album by Joshua Redman
- Released: May 7, 2013
- Recorded: September 27–29, 2012
- Studio: Avatar, New York City
- Genre: Jazz
- Length: 57:29
- Label: Nonesuch
- Producer: Brad Mehldau

Joshua Redman chronology
James Farm (2011)	Walking Shadows (2013)	Trios Live (2014)

Walking Shadows is a studio album by jazz saxophonist Joshua Redman. It was released in 2013 by Nonesuch Records.

== Music and recording ==
The arrangements were written by Dan Coleman, Patrick Zimmerli, and Brad Mehldau. Mehldau was also the producer. Most of the tracks include strings, but some, including "Stop This Train" and "Let It Be", are small-group performances.

The album was recorded on September 27–29, 2012, at Avatar Studios in New York City. It was released by Nonesuch Records on May 7, 2013.

== Reception ==
The AllMusic reviewer suggested that "These are some of the most nuanced, lyrical, and romantic recordings Redman has ever produced." John Fordham wrote that "It's a beautifully played project, but perhaps a shade on the tasteful side for some jazzers."

Professional ratings
Aggregate scores
Source	Rating
Metacritic	75/100
Review scores
Source	Rating
All About Jazz	4.5/5 stars
AllMusic	4/5 stars
The Guardian	3/5 stars
The Irish Times	3/5 stars
Jazzwise	3/5 stars
musicOMH	4/5 stars
PopMatters	8/10
Spin	3.5/5 stars
Tom Hull	B−

== Track listing ==
No.	Title	Writer(s)	Length
1.	"The Folks Who Live on the Hill"	Jerome Kern, Oscar Hammerstein II	4:00
2.	"Lush Life"	Billy Strayhorn	6:42
3.	"Stop This Train"	John Mayer, Pino Palladino	4:42
4.	"Adagio"	Johann Sebastian Bach	3:14
5.	"Easy Living"	Ralph Rainger, Leo Robin
6.	"Doll Is Mine"	Amedeo Maria Pace, Kazu Makino, Simone Maria Pace	5:55
7.	"Infant Eyes"	Wayne Shorter	5:05
8.	"Let It Be"	John Lennon, Paul McCartney	5:12
9.	"Final Hour"	Joshua Redman	2:42
10.	"Last Glimpse of Gotham"	Brad Mehldau	3:26
11.	"Stardust"	Hoagy Carmichael, Mitchell Parish	5:50
12.	"Let Me Down Easy"	Redman	4:56
Total length:			57:29

== Personnel ==
- Joshua Redman – tenor saxophone
- Brad Mehldau – piano
- Larry Grenadier – bass
- Brian Blade – drums
- Dan Coleman – string arrangements, orchestra director
- Avril Brown – violin
- Christina Courtin – violin
- Karen Karlsrud – violin
- Ann Leathers – violin
- Katherine Livolsi-Landau – violin
- Joanna Maurer – violin
- Courtney Orlando – violin
- Yuri Vodovos – violin
- Vincent Lionti – viola
- Daniel Panner – viola
- Dov Scheindlin – viola
- Stephanie Cummins – cello
- Eugene Moye – cello
- Ellen Westermann – cello
- Timothy Cobb – bass
- Pamela Sklar – flute
- Robert Carlisle – French horn

== Charts ==
Chart performance for Walking Shadows
Chart (2013)	Peak position
Belgian Albums (Ultratop Flanders)	165
Belgian Albums (Ultratop Wallonia)	192
French Albums (SNEP)	153
US Top Jazz Albums (Billboard)	4
