= Don't Explain (Joel Frahm album) =

Studio album by Joel Frahm
- Recorded: December 2001
- Genre: Jazz
- Label: Palmetto

Don't Explain is an album by jazz saxophonist Joel Frahm.

== Background ==
Frahm and pianist Brad Mehldau had been friends since the age of 15.

== Music and recording ==
The album was recorded in December 2001. The material consists of "six jazz standards, one familiar Ornette Coleman fixture, one memorable pop classic, and one original composition." "Mehldau, who functions as the entire rhythm section, alternates between being an accompanist, a soloist, and an equal part of the ensembles."

== Reception ==
The Penguin Guide to Jazz described the overall result as "a very beautiful but slightly soporific album."

Professional ratings
Review scores
Source	Rating
AllMusic	4/5 stars
The Penguin Guide to Jazz	3/4 stars

== Track listing ==
1. "Don't Explain" (Billie Holiday/Arthur Herzog Jr.) – 3:22
2. "Get Happy" (Harold Arlen/Ted Koehler) – 3:52
3. "Oleo" (Sonny Rollins) – 3:58
4. "Round Midnight No. 3" (Thelonious Monk/Cootie Williams/Bernie Hanighen) – 4:39
5. "Mother Nature's Son" (John Lennon/Paul McCartney) – 5:43
6. "East of the Sun" (Brooks Bowman) – 5:03
7. "Turnaround" (Ornette Coleman) – 5:32
8. "Away from Home" (Joel Frahm) – 5:33
9. "Smile" (Charlie Chaplin/John Turner) – 5:06
10. "Round Midnight No. 1" (Monk/Williams/Hanighen) – 7:35

== Personnel ==
- Joel Frahm – tenor sax, soprano sax
- Brad Mehldau – piano
