= Highway Rider =

Studio album by Brad Mehldau
- Released: 16 March 2010
- Recorded: February 16–28 and May 12–19, 2009
- Studio: Ocean Way (Hollywood, California)
- Genre: Jazz
- Length: 104:00
- Label: Nonesuch Records
- Producer: Jon Brion

Brad Mehldau chronology
Long Ago and Far Away (2007)	Highway Rider (2009)	Love Songs (2010)

Professional ratings
Review scores
Source	Rating
AllMusic	4.5/5 stars
DownBeat	4.5/5 stars
Tom Hull	B+

Highway Rider is an album by Brad Mehldau, released in 2010 by Nonesuch Records.

== Background ==
It was Mehldau's second collaboration with producer Jon Brion (after Largo), and it features saxophonist Joshua Redman, drummer Matt Chamberlain, and a chamber orchestra led by Dan Coleman, as well as Mehldau's regular trio partners, bassist Larry Grenadier and drummer Jeff Ballard.

== Track listing ==
All tracks are written by Brad Mehldau.

Disc one
No.	Title	Length
1.	"John Boy"	3:15
2.	"Don't Be Sad"	8:40
3.	"At the Tollbooth"	1:07
4.	"Highway Rider"	7:45
5.	"The Falcon Will Fly Again"	8:21
6.	"Now You Must Climb Alone"	4:05
7.	"Walking the Peak"	8:00

Disc two
No.	Title	Length
1.	"We'll Cross the River Together"	12:28
2.	"Capriccio"	5:20
3.	"Sky Turning Grey [for Elliott Smith]"	6:24
4.	"Into the City"	7:36
5.	"Old West"	8:28
6.	"Come with Me"	6:19
7.	"Always Departing"	6:20
8.	"Always Returning"	9:52

== Personnel ==
Band

- Brad Mehldau – Piano (Disc 1: 1–5, 7; Disc 2: 1–6, 8), Pump Organ (Disc 1: 2; Disc 2: 3), Yamaha CS-80 Polyphonic Analog Synthesizer (Disc 1: 4), Orchestral Bells (Disc 1: 7; Disc 2: 1, 8), Handclaps (Disc 2: 2)
- Jeff Ballard – Percussion (Disc 1: 1, 5; Disc 2: 2), snare brush (Disc 1: 2), Drums (Disc 1: 7; Disc 2: 1, 4, 6, 8); Handclaps (Disc 2: 2)
- Joshua Redman – Soprano Saxophone (Disc 1: 1, 5; Disc 2: 2, 8), Tenor Saxophone (Disc 1: 2, 7; Disc 2: 1, 3, 5), Handclaps (Disc 2: 2)
- Larry Grenadier – Bass (Disc 1: 2, 4, 7; Disc 2: 1, 3, 4, 6, 8), Handclaps (Disc 2: 2)
- Matt Chamberlain – drums (Disc 1: 2, 4, 5, 7, 8; Disc 2: 2, 3), Handclaps (Disc 2: 2)
- Orchestra, Dan Coleman, Conductor (Disc 1: 1, 2, 6, 7; Disc 2: 1, 7, 8)
- The Fleurettes – Vocals (Disc 1: 5)

Production

- Jon Brion – producer, mixing
- Gregg Koller – engineer, mixing
- Eric Caudieux – engineer
- Alan Yoshida – mastering
- Robert Hurwitz – executive producer
- Richard Misrach – cover photograph
- Lawrence Azerrad – graphic design
