= Festival Mozaic =

- Genre: classical music
- Dates: July
- Location: San Luis Obispo
- Coordinates: 35.2828°N 120.6596°W
- Years active: 1971–present
- Founders: Clifton Swanson
- Attendance: 500+
- Website: www.festivalmozaic.org

Festival Mozaic is an annual orchestral and chamber music festival held in the city of San Luis Obispo and various venues throughout San Luis Obispo County, California. Festival Mozaic is organized and presented by The San Luis Obispo Mozart Festival Association, a nonprofit organization governed by a board of local leaders and a managing staff of professionals. The festival presents 20 musical events during July with 500+ people in attendance each year.

== History ==
Festival Mozaic was founded in 1971 by Clifton Swanson, Ronald Ratcliffe, and John Russell, professors of music at California Polytechnic State University (Cal Poly), as the San Luis Obispo Mozart Festival to honor composer Wolfgang Amadeus Mozart.

With an initial offering of three concerts in 1971, over its five decades, the festival has grown to 20 concerts with an ever-expanding range of programming, including early music, contemporary classical music, jazz, opera, world music, and new commissions and world premieres. Venues include Mission San Luis Obispo de Tolosa in the heart of San Luis Obispo, Serra Chapel in nearby Shandon, California, and the Performing Arts Center at California Polytechnic State University. The summer festival includes orchestra, chamber music, solo recitals, choral works, and crossover artists as well as master classes and programs for children. The festival also presents events designed to teach classical music, titled Notable Encounters, and a fall and spring concert series titled Wintermezzo. The festival has been reviewed in various forums such as Musical America, KCET, New Times, the Los Angeles Times, and The Tribune (San Luis Obispo) and is included in various festival lists including The New York Times A Guide to Summer Music Festivals.

=== Notable performers ===
Emanuel Ax, Jeffrey Kahane, The Romero Guitar Quartet, Jerome Lowenthal, Richard Goode, Chanticleer, Rod Gilfry, William Bolcom, Paul O'Dette, Christopher Hogwood, Malcolm Bilson, Nicholas McGegan, Carter Brey, Audra McDonald, Jon Kimura Parker, Bela Fleck, Christopher O'Riley, Hilary Hahn, Nathaniel Rosen, Dmitri and Maxim Shostakovich, Mstislav Rostropovich, Edgar Meyer, Kronos Quartet, Turtle Island String Quartet, Jonah Kim, Bion Tsang, Noam Elkies, Kristina Reiko Cooper, Erik Arvinder

=== Guest conductors ===
Maxim Shostakovich, Christopher Hogwood, Nicholas McGegan, John Adams

=== Music directors ===
- 1971–2004: Clifton Swanson
- 1992–2004: Jeffrey Kahane, associate conductor
- 2005–present: Scott Yoo

== See also ==
- List of classical music festivals
