= Mechanics Hall (Worcester, Massachusetts) =

Concert hall in Worcester, Massachusetts

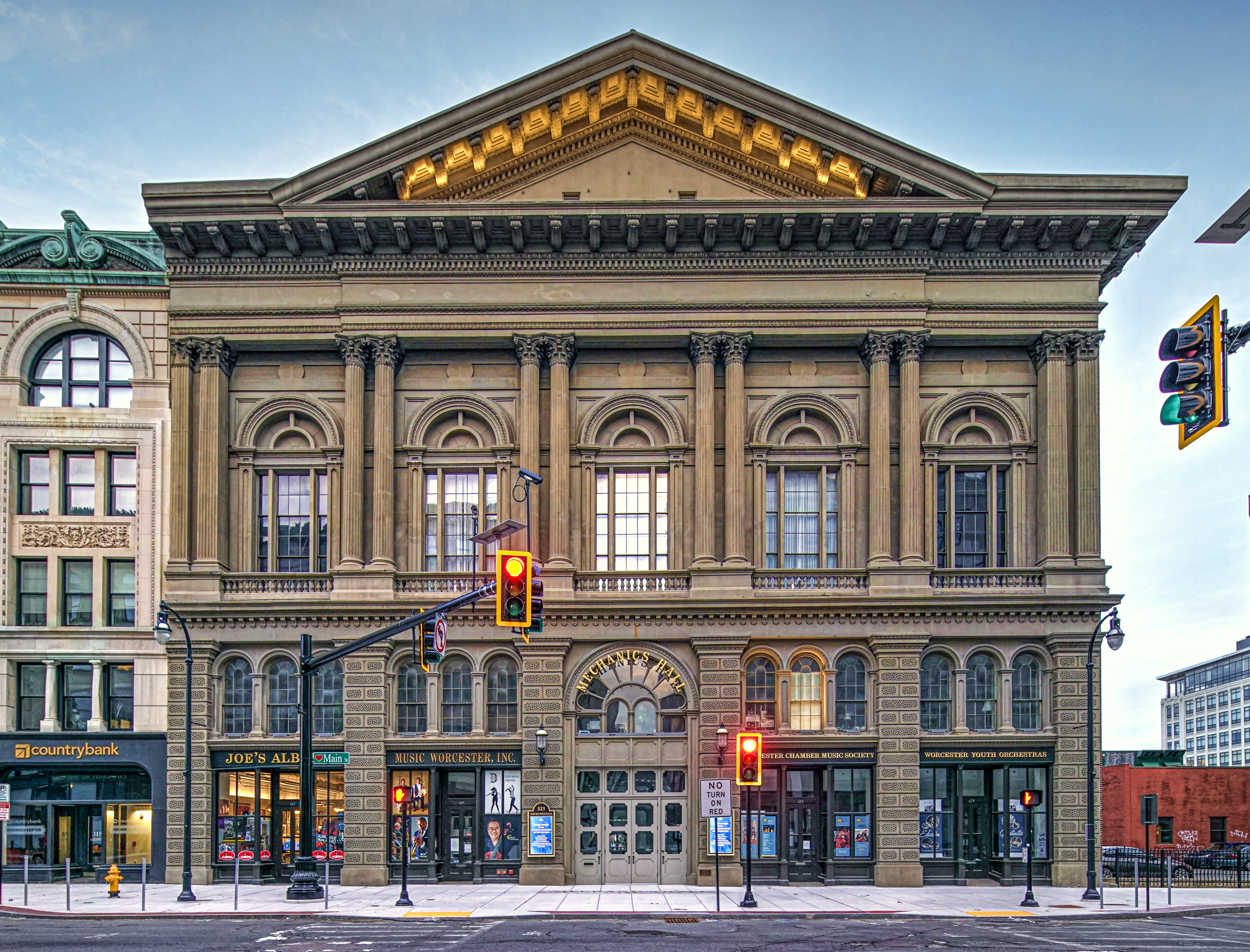
- Interactive map of Mechanics Hall
- Address: 321 Main St.
- Location: Worcester, MA
- Public transit: Framingham/Worcester Line Union Station

Construction
- Built: 1855
- Renovated: 1977

Website
- www.mechanicshall.org
- Mechanics Hall
- U.S. National Register of Historic Places
- U.S. Historic district – Contributing property
- Location within Massachusetts Location within the United States
- Coordinates: 42°15′56.79″N 71°48′7.03″W
- Architect: Boyden & Ball
- Architectural style: Renaissance
- Part of: Mechanics' Hall District (ID80000577)
- NRHP reference No.: 72000152

Significant dates
- Added to NRHP: November 9, 1972
- Designated CP: March 5, 1980

Mechanics Hall is a concert hall in Worcester, Massachusetts. It was built in 1857 in the Renaissance Revival style and restored in 1977. Built as part of the early nineteenth-century worker's improvement movement, it is now a concert and performing arts venue ranked as one of the top four concert halls in North America and in the top twelve between Europe and the Americas. It also houses a recording studio.

== History ==
The Great Hall

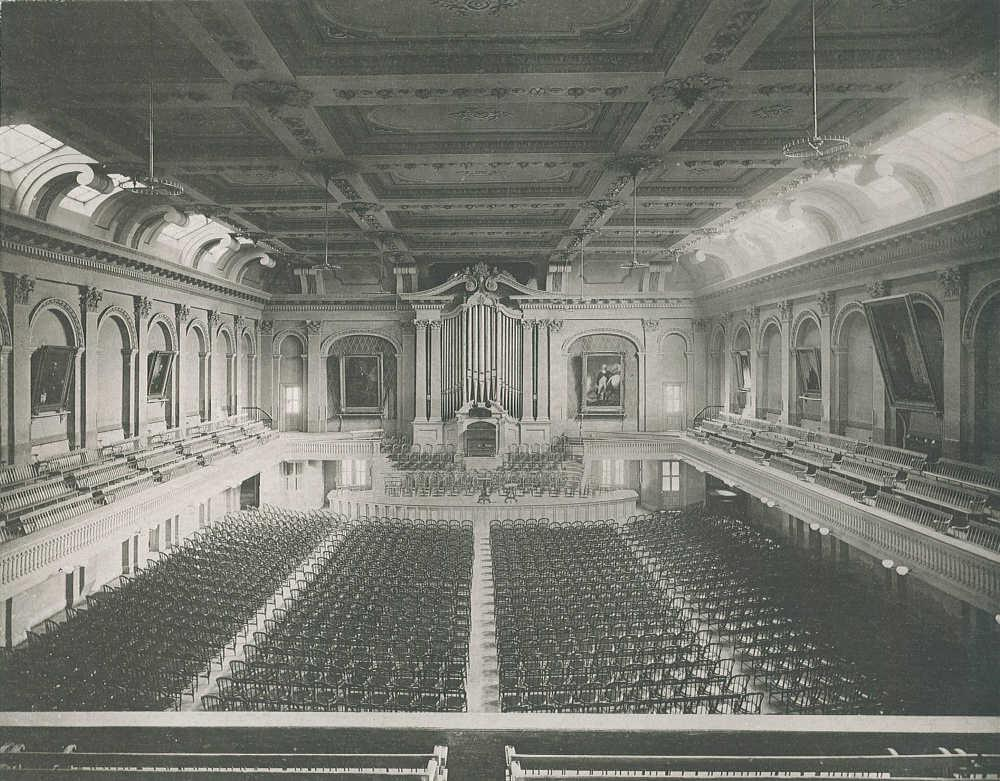
1885

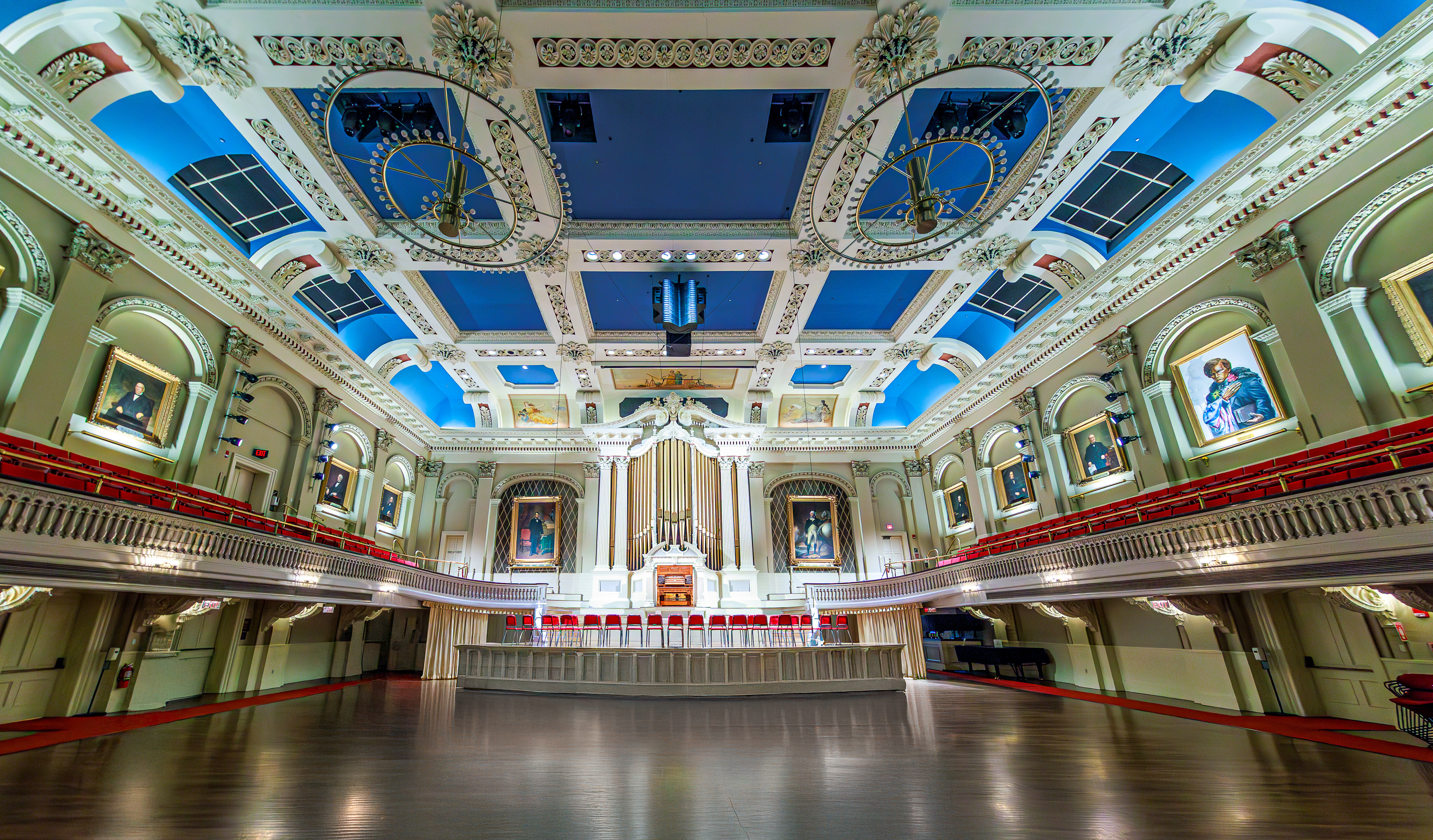
2025

Workers in Worcester formed the Mechanics Association in 1842 to help members develop the knowledge and skills to manufacture and run machinery in the mills. In 1857 they built Mechanics Hall to house educational and cultural activities. Mechanics Hall featured a large concert hall on the third floor. Its acoustics enabled audiences to hear speakers' voices and music distinctly without benefit of the as-yet-not-invented electronic amplifier. A pipe organ was subsequently installed in 1864. Featuring meeting rooms, a library, and two halls, the building became a hub of activity, drawing speakers from Charles Dickens to Susan B. Anthony. The superb acoustics of Mechanics Hall would attract orchestras, bands, and renowned performers from Enrico Caruso to Ella Fitzgerald, Yo Yo Ma to Mel Tormé.

On April 3, 1910, President William Howard Taft visited Mechanics Hall to speak about labor issues to a meeting of Brotherhoods in Train Service, following a visit to his great-aunt in Millbury, Massachusetts. He was greeted by a parade and "several thousand New Englanders."

By the mid-20th century, downtown Worcester had declined, and the aging building fell into disfavor as a meeting place. Mechanics Hall was rented out for sporting events such as boxing, wrestling, basketball, and roller-skating. The building continued its decline, and trustees of the dwindling Mechanics Association sought to sell the property. When urban renewal threatened the hall with destruction, the Worcester Heritage Society stepped in. The community rallied around Mechanics Hall once again, raising $5 million for its restoration in 1977. Boston based architecture firm Anderson Notter Finegold completed the restoration. In reversing the decline of Mechanics Hall, Worcester halted the decline of its downtown, and the city experienced a renaissance.

== The Worcester Organ ==
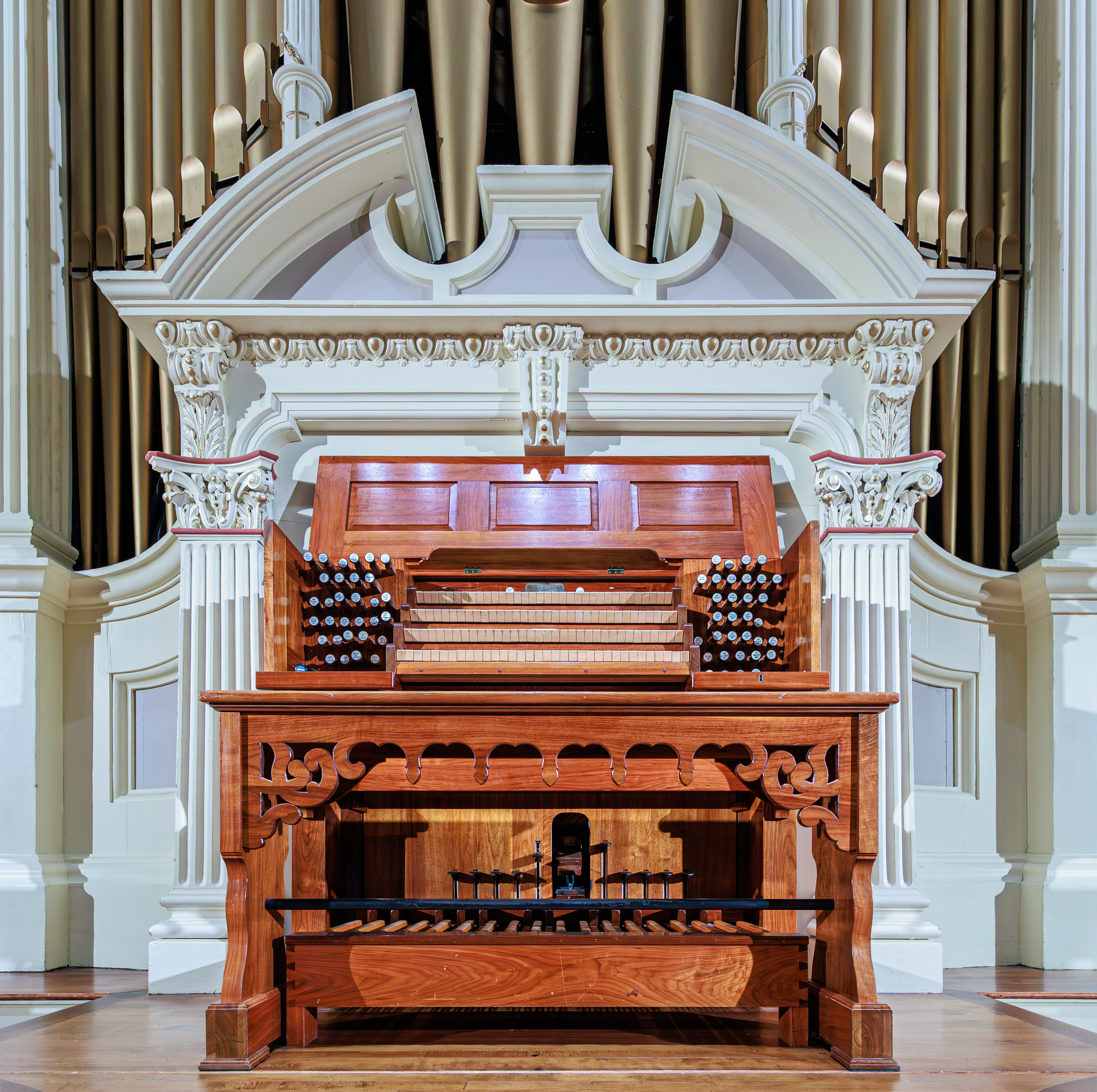
The Worcester Organ, aka The Hook Organ

The Worcester Organ, built in 1864 by E. & G.G. Hook of Boston, is the oldest unaltered four-keyboard organ in the Western Hemisphere still located at its installation site. The organ was funded by donations from Worcester citizens, and free concerts were a condition of their gift. It was christened "The Worcester Organ" to distinguish it from the Walcker Organ at Boston Music Hall, though it is often referred to as "The Hook Organ." The organ has 52 stops and 3,504 pipes. It was the largest instrument made by the Hook company at the time; the largest pipe, made of Eastern Pine, is 16 feet tall.

=== Decline ===
As early as the 1870s, the organ started only being played occasionally during music festivals, and declined significantly after the opening of Worcester Memorial Auditorium in 1933. The organ, ignored and largely unused, fell into disrepair in the 1930s through 1970s as Mechanics Hall struggled financially.

=== Revival ===
The organ was fully restored in 1982 to its original 1864 state, and restored again for the organ's rededication in 2014. In 2007, a regular concert series was established to ensure a consistent performance schedule, and the instrument is played at events such as graduations and weddings.

== See also ==
- Mechanics' Hall District
- National Register of Historic Places listings in northwestern Worcester, Massachusetts
- National Register of Historic Places listings in Worcester County, Massachusetts
