= Bad Bonn Kilbi =

Swiss music festival

- Genre: Experimental, Noise rock, Electronic
- Dates: May
- Locations: Düdingen, Switzerland
- Years active: 1991–present
- Website: http://kilbi.badbonn.ch/

Bad Bonn Kilbi is an annual music festival held in Düdingen, in the canton of Fribourg, Switzerland. Founded in 1991 by the rural venue Bad Bonn, the festival has grown into one of Switzerland’s most prominent events for independent, experimental, and avant‑garde music. It is widely regarded as the country’s leading indie and discovery festival, known for its eclectic programming, intimate atmosphere, and commitment to artistic independence. The festival is curated by Daniel Fontana, whose programming philosophy emphasizes curiosity and experimentation over commercial expectations. Bad Bonn Kilbi is noted for its remote location, rapid sell‑outs, and its role in showcasing emerging Swiss and international artists across a wide range of genres. Traditionally held in late May/early June, the festival shifted to a late‑summer/early‑autumn schedule beginning in 2025, partly due to agricultural activity on nearby farmland. Despite the change, the Kilbi maintained its reputation for experimentation and discovery.

== History ==
Bad Bonn Kilbi was established in 1991 by the team behind Bad Bonn, a small pub and concert venue located outside Düdingen. Under the direction of Daniel Fontana, the venue gradually evolved into a nationally recognized cultural institution. Early editions of the festival were modest, but its reputation grew steadily throughout the 1990s and 2000s as it attracted increasingly adventurous line‑ups and a loyal audience.

By the 2010s, the Kilbi had become widely regarded as Switzerland’s most important indie festival, celebrated for its stylistic diversity and its role in promoting underground and experimental music.

In 2022, Fontana received the Swiss Music Prize, with the jury describing the Kilbi as a “milestone of Swiss music history.”

== Programming and curation ==
Bad Bonn Kilbi’s programming is shaped by a distinctive curatorial philosophy established by Daniel Fontana. Fontana has stated that he never selected artists based on what he believed the audience wanted, instead prioritizing personal artistic interest and the desire to present unfamiliar or boundary‑pushing music.

This approach has resulted in line‑ups that frequently include:

- Emerging and underground artists
- Experimental and avant‑garde performers
- Global and diasporic musical traditions
- Genre‑defying acts that blend performance art, noise, dance, and theatre

The festival is known for avoiding predictable headliners. In 2024, for example, the Kilbi deliberately programmed a line‑up without major international stars, focusing instead on artists from Japan, Argentina, Senegal, Pakistan, Mexico, and other regions. Despite the absence of big names, the festival sold out within seconds, reflecting the trust audiences place in its curatorial vision.

== Location and venue ==
The festival takes place on the grounds surrounding Bad Bonn, a small music venue located approximately a 15‑minute walk from Düdingen railway station. The venue is situated in a rural area bordered by fields, woodland, and a nearby lake, contributing to the festival’s distinctive atmosphere.

The festival often plays on its remote location with the slogan “Where the hell is Bad Bonn?” The rural setting allows for late‑night performances without disturbing residents and fosters a sense of intimacy and community among attendees.

== Reception and cultural impact ==
Bad Bonn Kilbi is widely regarded as one of the most adventurous and stylistically diverse festivals in Europe. Swiss media frequently describe it as:

- an “indie mecca”
- a “discovery festival”
- a “milestone of Swiss music history”

The Kilbi is known for selling out within minutes, and in some years within seconds, despite its focus on lesser‑known or experimental artists. Its audience is often characterized as open‑minded and receptive to challenging or unconventional performances.

The festival has also played a significant role in elevating Swiss artists.

== Lineups ==
=== 2009 ===
Friday 29 May 2009
- Deerhoof
- Lightning Bolt
- Gang Gang Dance
- Reverend Beat-Man Blues Trash Trio
- Sophie Hunger
- Agent Orange
- Monno
- Round Table Knights
- Grey Mole & Pierre Omer

Saturday 30 May 2009
- Mogwai
- Monotonix
- Micachu & The Shapes
- Tunng
- Shantel & Bucovina Club Orkestar
- Rainbow Arabia
- Evelinn Trouble & Trespassers
- Kummerbuben
- Wildbirds & Peacedrums
- Tim Exile
- Black Cargoes
- The Good, The Bad And No Ugly
Sunday 31 May 2009
- Sonic Youth
- Sunn O)))
- Final Fantasy
- The Drones
- Miss Kittin & The Hacker
- The Mae Shi
- Mahjongg
- Carsick Cars
- Extra Life
- DJ Fett

=== 2010 ===
Wednesday 26 May 2010
- Aphex Twin (DJ/VJ Show)
- Luke Vibert (DJ Set)
- DMX Krew
- Jimmy Edgar
- Dave Phillips
- Loops Haunt
- Deconstructing Drumboys
- Joker feat. MC Nomad
- Minimetal
Thursday 27 May 2010
- HEALTH
- Dum Dum Girls
- Tocotronic
- Atlas Sound
- Tamikrest & Dirtmusic
- The Antlers
- Neon Indian
- Buvette
- Round Table Knights
- Overdrive Amp Explosion
- We Loyal
Friday 28 May 2010
- A Place to Bury Strangers
- Hot Chip
- Electric Eel Shock
- Wolf Eyes
- Rother/Shelley/Mullan (Neu!, Sonic Youth, Tall Firs)
- Sun Ra Arkestra
- Polvo
- Ben Frost
- Peelander-Z
- Bit-Tuner
- The Good, The Bad And No Ugly
Saturday 29 May 2010
- Koch-Schütz-Studer & The Young Gods
- Lee Ranaldo
- Beak>
- Solange La Frange
- Wolf Parade
- Yeasayer
- Maja Ratkje & Stephen O'Malley
- Secret Chiefs 3
- Kode9 & The Space Ape
- Kassette
- Fat32
- DJ Fett

=== 2011 ===
Thursday 26 May 2011
- Queens of the Stone Age
- Animal Collective
- Matthew Dear
- Swans
- Karma To Burn
- Disappears feat. Steve Shelley
- Nisennenmondai
- Must Have Been Tokyo
- Duffstep
- Bit-Tuner/.Suffix
- Labrador City
- The Dough Rollers
- Nik!
Friday 27 May 2011
- Caribou
- The Tallest Man On Earth
- Crystal Fighters
- Akron/Family
- Darkstar
- Gonjasufi
- Lucky Dragons
- Julianna Barwick
- Barn Owl
- Kalabrese & Rumpelorchester
- The Legendary Lightness
- Yokonoe
- Rizzoknor
- Trottles Of The Dead
Saturday 28 May 2011
- The Walkmen
- Battles
- Apparat
- Shackleton
- Suuns
- The Ex
- Anika
- Anna Aaron
- Feldermelder/Fichtre
- Monoski
- Buvette
- Combineharvester performs Some Ditty A Mountain II
- Broken Heart Collector
- Grand Atlas Mondial
- DJ Fett

=== 2012 ===
Thursday 31 May 2012
- Kings of Convenience
- Beach House
- Oneohtrix Point Never
- Earth
- Clark
- Emika
- Lower Dens
- Awesome Tapes From Africa
- Bill Wells & Aidan Moffat
- Fai Baba
- Les Yeux Sans Visage
- Tar Queen
- MMMH!
- Kalabrese (DJ Set)
- DJ CIO
Friday 1 June 2012
- Metronomy
- Dieter (Yello) Meier - Out Of Chaos
- Lee Scratch Perry & The Whitebellyrats
- Get Well Soon
- Rustie
- Moonface
- Dimlite
- Jagwa Music
- Elektro Guzzi
- Aie Ça Gicle
- Zigitros
- Rotkeller & Aaawesome Colors (VJ)
- Station 17
- NGUZUNGUZU (DJ Set)
- Demolition Blues
- DJ Ms. Hyde & DJ Inderrock
- DJ CIO
Saturday 2 June 2012
- The Afghan Whigs
- Mudhoney
- Coroner
- Lee Ranaldo
- Liturgy
- Mark Ernestus presents Jeri-Jeri
- The War On Drugs
- Other Lives
- Action Beat
- Dead Western
- Praed
- DJ Fett
- Za!
- DJ Marcelle
- Hubeskyla
- La Gale
- Velvet Two Stripes
- DJ CIO

=== 2013 ===
Thursday 23 May 2013
- My Bloody Valentine
- Jozef van Wissem & Jim Jarmusch x SQÜRL
- Dan Deacon
- Tinariwen
- Thee Oh Sees
- Dark Dark Dark
- Kurt Vile & the Violators
- A Crashed Blackbird Called Rosehip
- Dj Fitz
- Domi Chansorn
- Trottles of the Dead
- Dead Bunny
- One Sentence. Supervisor
Friday 24 May 2013
- Grizzly Bear
- Liars
- Connan Mockasin
- Fucked Up
- Pantha du Prince
- Sóley
- Mozes and the Firstborn
- Peter Swanson
- Rebuilding the Rights of Statues
- Rotkeller
- Pandour
- Minimetal
- Dj Marcelle - Another Nice Mess
- Evelinn Trouble
- Mother Razorblade
Saturday 25 May 2013
- The Flaming Lips
- Gold Panda
- Death Grips
- Jandek
- Allah-Las
- Andy Stott
- Valgeir Sigurðsson
- White Fence
- Bass Drum of Death
- SKIP&DIE
- Dj Fett
- Golden Diskó Ship
- Camera
- Trust
- Julian Sartorius
- Grand Atlas Mondial
- Pony del Sol
- Speck

=== 2014 ===
Thursday 29 May 2014
- Black Lips
- Wild Beasts
- Superchunk
- Jungle
- Acid Arab
- Bombino
- Wooden Shjips
- Hospitality
- Forest Swords
- Larry Gus
- Praed
- Puts Marie
- Dj Fitz
- Lee Schornoz & Michel Gorski
- Trottles of the Dead
- Totemaus
- Mrs. Burroughs
Friday 30 May 2014
- Mogwai
- Goat
- Angel Olsen
- Pond
- R. Stevie Moore
- Nisennenmondai
- Nadine Shah
- Son Lux
- Com Truise
- Phèdre
- Dj Marcelle - Another Nice Mess
- Feldermelder
- Kotra
- Zavoloka
- Hubeskyla
- Leon
- Fell
- Mrs. Burroughs
Saturday 31 May 2014
- Neutral Milk Hotel
- Diamond Version
- Jagwar Ma
- Meridian Brothers
- The Monsters
- Birth of Joy
- Rodrigo Amarante
- Scarlett O'Hanna
- Selvhenter
- Forks
- Dim Grimm / Dimlite
- Mir
- Wolfman
- Egopusher
- Dj Fett
- Toronaut
- Mrs. Burroughs
- Rocky Wood

=== 2015 ===
Thursday 28 May 2015
- The Black Angels
- Mac DeMarco
- Nils Frahm
- Thee Oh Sees
- Tanya Tagaq
- Klaus Johann Grobe
- Wand
- Orchestre Tout Puissant Marcel Duchamp
- Optimo
- Alien Nightlife - The Sound of the Extraterrestrials
- Verveine
- Duck Duck Grey Duck
- Mr. Airplane Man
- Dj Fitz
- Dj Fett
- Schnellertollermeier
Friday 29 May 2015
- Selda feat. Boom Pam
- Sleaford Mods
- Bo Ningen
- Baths
- Lee Gamble
- Circle
- Tomaga
- Steve Gunn
- Hailu Mergia with Tony Buck & Mike Majkowski
- Puts Marie
- Mary Lattimore & Jeff Zeigler
- Mira & Chris Schwarzwalder
- Monoski
- None of Them
- POW!
- Salut c'est cool
Saturday 30 May 2015
- The Thurston Moore Band
- Shabazz Palaces
- Viet Cong
- DakhaBrakha
- Arthur Russell's Instrumentals directed by Peter Gordon
- Noura Mint Seymali
- Golden Teacher
- Zebra Katz
- Dj Marcelle
- Robbing Millions
- Vessel
- Lorenzo Senni
- The Slow Show
- Fumaça Preta
- Morgan Delt
- Remi
- Lord Kesseli & the Drums

=== 2016 ===
Thursday 2 June 2016
- Ty Segall & The Muggers
- Boredoms
- Julia Holter
- Ogoya Nengo & The Dodo Women's Group
- Feldermelder plays Erratic Visuals by Supermafia
- Föllakzoid
- Stanley Brinks & The Wave Pictures & Freschard
- Pyrit
- Insanlar
- S S S S
- Knöppel
- Papaya Fuzz
- Zaperlipopette
- Horizon Liquide
- Gaia
- Dj Fett
- Marlon McNeill's Singing Tree (installation)
Friday 3 June 2016
- Floating Points
- Minor Victories
- Powell
- Parquet Courts
- Fat White Family
- A Love From Outer Space
- Jenny Hval
- Pissed Jeans
- No Zu
- Cate Le Bon
- Lotic
- Sauna Youth
- Isolated Lines
- Silver Firs
- Axel Flóvent
- La Tène
- The Homesick
- Marlon McNeill's Singing Tree (installation)
- Stanley Brinks & Freschard & The Old Time Kaniks
Saturday 4 June 2016
- Savages
- Kamasi Washington
- Ash Ra Tempel Experience Feat. Manuel Göttsching, Ariel Pink, Shags Chamberlain & Oren Ambarchi
- Ata Kak
- Protomartyr
- Container
- Cakes da Killa
- Sister Iodine
- Car Seat Headrest
- Ninos Du Brasil
- Beach Slang
- Metz
- Dollkraut
- Odd Beholder
- Augenwasser
- Manuel Troller
- Dieb13
- Dj Marcelle
- Herr Wempe
- Marlon McNeill's Singing Tree (installation)
- Stanley Brinks & Freschard & The Old Time Kaniks

=== 2017 ===
Friday 2 June 2017
- Sleep
- Angel Olsen
- Jacques
- Flamingods
- Puce Mary
- Idris Ackamoor & the Pyramids
- N.M.O.
- Afrirampo
- Norberto Lobo
- Lord Kesseli and the Drums
- Lena Willikens
- Yak
- DUBAI Sprinters
- Pure Mania
- UFO feat. DIM GRIMM
- H E X
- DJ Three Four
Saturday 3 June 2017
- The Moonlandingz
- OOIOO
- This Is Not This Heat
- Princess Nokia
- Oliver Coates
- Mandolin Sisters
- Not Waving
- Xylouris White
- KOKOKO!
- Ultimate Painting
- Dengue Dengue Dengue!
- Nahawa Doumbia
- PILL
- Böse Wicht and his Böse Monsters
- Moody
- DJ Marcelle
- Galopp
- Julian Sartorius
- Allandy Shanty
Sunday 4 June 2017
- King Gizzard & the Lizard Wizard
- Anna Meredith
- Gaika
- Kaitlyn Aurelia Smith
- Weyes Blood
- Khidja
- Show Me the Body
- Mitski
- Schnellertollermeier
- Jessy Lanza
- One Sentence. Supervisor
- Mdou Moctar
- Jlin
- Pandour
- infinite bisous
- AUTISTI (Louis Jucker & Emilie Zoé)
- White Wine
- DJ Fett
- Allandy Shanty
- Saaleek
- Phil Hayes & The Trees
- Julian Sartorius

=== 2018 ===
Thursday 31 May 2018
- Deerhunter
- Exploded View
- John Maus
- Tshegue
- Nick Hakim
- Nihiloxica
- Warmduscher
- UUUU
- Bonaventure
- AIR LQD
- Peter Conradin Zumthor
- Golden Dawn Arkestra
- Jimi Jules & Kalabrese
- Gibraltar Vacuum
- Stella Chiweshe
- Ester Poly
- Alois
- Lautsprecher Orchester Freiburg presents "Zweikommasieben plays Brendan Dougherty's Economy and Failure"
Friday 1 June 2018
- James Holden & the Animal Spirits
- The Mystery of the Bulgarian Voices ft. Lisa Gerrard
- Khruangbin
- Caterina Barbieri
- La Tène + Guests
- Downtown Boys
- Reverend Beat-Man & the New Wave
- Vagabon
- Andrew Weatherall
- Isolated Lines
- Lido Pimienta
- Harvey Rushmore & the Octopus
- Ziúr
- Hanreti
- Savage Grounds
- Pony
- Melissa Kassab
- Schubot/Gradinger
- Lautsprecher Orchester Freiburg presents Dave Philips
Saturday 2 June 2018
- Sevdaliza
- Horse Lords
- Pan Daijing
- AHMED - New Jazz Imagination
- Flat Worms
- Midnight Sister
- Injury Reserve
- Giant Swan
- The Master Musicians of Jajouka led by Bachir Attar
- Nadah El Shazly
- DJ Marcelle
- Here Lies Man
- Deena Abdelwahed
- FAKA
- Orchestre les Mangelepa
- East Sister
- Friendly Fire
- DJ Fett
- Melissa Kassab
- Schubot/Gradinger
- Lautsprecher Orchester Freiburg presents d'incise

=== 2019 ===
Thursday 30 May 2019
- Linn da Quebrada
- Sophie Hunger
- Yves Tumor
- Jpegmafia
- Amyl and the Sniffers
- Obongjayar
- Boy Harsher
- L'Eclair
- Flohio
- Frederik
- Willikens & Ivkovic
- DJ Raph
- Tresque
- Ensemble BaBeL-LEON
- The Burden Remains
- Tout Bleu
- Black Sea Dahu
- Twixt
- Lautsprecher Orchester Freiburg presents DJ Marcelle
- Michelle Steinbeck
Friday 31 May 2019
- SOPHIE
- slowthai
- Oktober Lieber
- RP Boo
- black midi
- DJ Marcelle
- INSECURE MEN
- Cocaine Piss
- Enyang Ha
- Dominic Oppliger & Papiro
- Cüneyt Sepetci
- Renée van Trier
- La Bohème
- RP Boo/Wright/Abbott Trio
- Kate NV
- Escape-ism
- Kablam
- Troller & Sartorius
- Fina Fitta
- Acid Amazonians
- Michelle Steinbeck
- Lautsprecher Orchester Freiburg presents Furtherset
- A Kaleidoscope of nothingness meets <<Oniromancier>>
Saturday 1 June 2019
- Courtney Barnett
- Sons Of Kemet
- Yaeji
- Connan Mockasin
- Yīn Yīn
- The Comet Is Coming
- Michelle Steinbeck
- Lotic
- Cyril Cyril
- Tomberlin
- Fiesta En El Vacío
- Emilie Zoé
- Crack Cloud
- Jonathan Bree
- Malphino
- DJ Fett
- Tommy Lobo
- Horse, I'm Virus
- Renée van Trier
- Noldi Alder & Béatrice Graf
- Julian Sartorius, Hans Koch und Martin Schütz dirigieren das Dreibühnen-Orchester
- A Kaleidoscope of nothingness meets <<Oniromancier>>

=== 2021 ===
Friday 3 September 2021
- Anika
- Convulsif
- Crème Solaire
- DJ Marcelle
- Duma
- Francis Eggs
- Lalalar
- Lautsprecher Orchester Freiburg presents DJ Marcelle
- Marcel De Sie
- Maria W Horn
- Mathis Neuhaus
- Nina Garcia - Antoine Chessex - Louis Schild
- NVST B2B Mona
- Schnellertollermeier
Saturday 4 September 2021
- Dame Area
- Feldermelder
- Goffbaby
- Horse Lords
- Hubeskyla
- Jacob Hannes
- Leoni Leoni
- Lyra Pramuk
- Lautsprecher Orchester Freiburg presents Lucas Monème & Benu Zitz
- Mathis Neuhaus
- MOESHA 13
- Nina Harker
- Noria Lilt
- Ozan Ata Canani & Karaba
- Peter Kernel
- Subito Zeitlos
- Zelgstrasse 43
Sunday 5 September 2021
- Alpha Maid
- Bbymutha
- Bitter Moon & After 5:08
- damelove
- DJ Fett
- Elischa Heller
- Heimat
- Julian Sartorius
- Kraake
- Lala &Ce
- Lautsprecher Orchester Freiburg presents Musique Infinie
- Mathis Neuhaus
- Omni Selassi
- Yalla Miku

=== 2022 ===
Friday 3 June 2022
- Aksak Maboul
- Baby Volcano
- BASSINÄ
- Beatrice Dillon
- Big Joanie
- Billy Nomates
- Brutalismus 3000
- Crack Cloud
- DECHA
- Delish Da Goddess
- DJ Marcelle
- Elischa Heller (DJ Set)
- État Des Choses
- IDLES
- Loraine James
- Los Bitchos
- Lucas Monème
- model home
- OneFootStep
- Turkana
Saturday 4 June 2022
- Alice
- Curl
- DJ Fett
- État Des Choses
- Ethyos 440
- Eve Owen
- Gilla Band
- Insomnia Isterica
- Joyful Seeorchester
- Kamaal Williams
- Kampire
- Kit Sebastian
- L'Rain
- Los Pashminas
- LOUIS JUCKER & BAND
- Lucas Monème
- Machine Girl
- MC Yallah & Debmaster
- R. Daneel Olivaw
- Senyawa
- Sharon Van Etten
- UFO ft Claire Huguenin & Marlon McNeill
- Völlig losgelöst!
Sunday 5 June 2022
- Arquebine Linnett
- Big Freedia
- Black Country, New Road
- Dry Cleaning
- État Des Choses
- Film 2
- Gabber Modus Operandi
- Jerusalem in My Heart
- Joyful Seeorchester
- Kelman Duran
- Leoni Leoni Hybrid
- Lex Amor
- Lucas Monème
- NÂR
- Oklou
- OKO DJ
- Slikback
- Squid
- Still House Plants
- Surfbort
- Vanligt Folk
- VÍz
- Zimmermann-Svosve-Grab

=== 2023 ===
Thursday 1 June 2023
- Alto Fuero
- Amnesia Scanner
- Disco Doom
- Down
- fulmine
- Guantanamo Baywatch
- Jockstrap
- Lazza Gio
- Marara Kelly
- Model/Actriz
- MinReCuliao
- Muovipussi
- Musique Infinie
- Noria Lilt
- Soul Glo
- Summer Satana
- Surprise Chef
- The Chats
- Veronica Vasicka
Friday 2 June 2023
- 070 Shake
- Ambassade
- BABY VOLCANO + FAMILIA EXPANDIDAAA
- Blackhaine
- Chupame El Dedo
- CLAMM
- Courtesy
- DEBONAIR
- DJ Marcelle
- DJ Travella
- LustSickPuppy
- M(h)aol
- Milla Pluton
- Moin
- Muovipussi
- Neuerdings
- Sessa
- Sudden Infant
- Taimashoe
- The Comet Is Coming
- Trounce
Saturday 3 June 2023
- Citron Citron
- DEBONAIR
- Deli Girls
- DJ Fett
- Donna Candy
- Down
- EGG IDIOT
- Gnod
- HAAi
- Jana Rush
- Kalabrese
- Lael Neale
- Manuel Troller
- Marina Herlop
- Mark Ernestus' Ndagga Rhythm Force
- Muovipussi
- NOI NOI
- Ocen James & Rian Treanor
- Omni Selassi
- Stefanie Stauffacher
- Σtella

=== 2024 ===
Thursday 30 May 2024
- EXEK
- Crumb
- Crème Solaire
- Backxwash
- EYE
- Lucas Monème (Hybrid DJ set)
- Alina Arshi
- Cinq
- HiTech
- Fat Dog
- Water from Your Eyes
- PALME CADELLI
- MISUSE VALUE
- No Home
- Blanco Teta
- Kabeaushé
- Mathis Neuhaus
- La Zizanyx
- Lucas Monème|Bernhard Zitz
Friday 31 May 2024
- 222Rn
- Fomies
- Special Interest
- Blanco Teta
- Ndox Electrique
- Evian Christ
- PLF
- Meril Wubslin
- Coco
- Naomie Klaus
- Jessica Ekomane & Afrorack
- Hammam Elektric
- Urin
- Parasite Jazz
- DJ Haram
- DJ Marcelle
- ¥ØU$UK€ ¥UK1MAT$U
- TRNSTN Radio Bollwerk
- Fritz Schuler
- Papiro
Saturday 1 June 2024
- YHWH Nailgun
- Ustad Noor Bakhsh
- Good Sad Happy Bad
- yeule
- Chelsea Wolfe
- Fantastic Twins
- High Vis
- Sextile
- CASISDEAD
- Meth Math
- Dreamcrusher
- Junee
- Laure Betris
- SOYUZ
- jason from the lake
- Les Soeurs Doga & Viktor Marek
- DJ Fett
- Nabihah Iqbal
- Tiernoise
- Blanco Teta
- TRNSTN Radio Bollwerk
- Lucas Monème|Bernhard Zitz

=== 2025 ===
Thursday 4 September 2025
- Beaks
- Beurre
- DAISY ODER ERNA
- DAS SCHREI NICHT SO ORKESTRA
- Emma DJ
- Jamira Estrada
- Jim White & Marisa Anderson
- Loto Retina
- MÂNAA b2b NVST
- Michelle Gurevich
- Naomie Klaus
- NATHALIE FROEHLICH x LA DÈRNIÈRE RAVE
- Nídia
- plus44Kaligula
- Sopraterra
- The Young Gods
- Vanessa Bedoret
Friday 5 September 2025
- Acopia
- Chunky
- Crystallmess
- Devon Rexi
- DJ B91
- DJ Marcelle
- Forsissies
- Frederik Valentin
- Gordan
- GORZ
- Ina Valeska
- Jim White’s All Hits with Guy Picciotto & Colleen Burke
- MAQUINA.
- Nadah El Shazly
- Nala Sinephro
- Nídia & Valentina
- REA
- SC'ÖÖF
- Soland Angel
- TYGAPAW
Saturday 6 September 2025
- BEA1991
- Chris Imler feat. Naomie Klaus
- Cramzers
- Daufødt
- DJ Europarking
- DJ Fett
- Etienne Blanchot
- GRRL & Made of Oak
- Jules Reidy
- Kassie Krut
- KG
- Lamin Fofana
- Le Recueil des Miracles
- Marisa Anderson
- MERZBOW
- Norbert Möslang
- Panic Shack
- Scalpel
- Sven Wunder
- Taimashoe
- Teki Latex
- Titanic
- Vincent Glanzmann

=== 2026 ===
Thursday 3 September 2026
- A Good Year
- Cortisa Star
- Darkitects
- Dasein
- DJ Marcelle
- Erreurjean
- Fantasy of a Broken Heart
- Horsegirl
- Hypereglacé by Foodporn
- Katokye
- Mensik
- Mutant Doll
- Piano garden
- Prostitute
- Renée van Trier
- ronr
- Sartorius Drum Ensemble RLLRLRLLRRLRLRLRLLRLRLR
- SHERELLE
- Sisso & Maiko
- Ultrabruma (Brenda & Maria Manuela)
- Vinnieragua’s The Hardcore Trainer
Friday 4 September 2026
- Anderson Do Paraiso
- Darkitects
- Decius
- Dino Brandão
- DJ Bus Replacement B2B Keepsakes
- Drook
- Flutorama
- Héloïse
- Jazz Lambaux
- JJJJJerome Ellis
- Josey Rebelle
- Julian Sartorius
- Katokye
- Kavari
- KMRU & Aho Ssan
- Lua Jungck
- Makossiri
- mark william lewis
- One Leg One Eye
- Piano garden
- Renéé Van Trier
- Seeorgel
- Sword II
- The Menstrual Cramps
- Ugly
Saturday 5 September 2026
- Alex Wilcox
- bela
- Brainrot Cowboy
- Colin Self presents Gasp!
- Courtesy
- Darkitects
- Die Brennnessel
- DJ Fett
- Etienne Blanchot
- EUROPA
- Julius Amber
- Manic Pixxies
- Microplastics
- Milkweed
- Nyron Higor
- Piano Garden
- Raphael Loher
- Remo Helfenstein Spite
- Renée Van Trier
- RHR
- Seeorgel
- Sicksassysix
- Somatic Rituals
- Traidora
- Ultra Cute
- Vinnieragua’s One Man Acid Band
