= Villette Sonique =

Music Festival in Paris

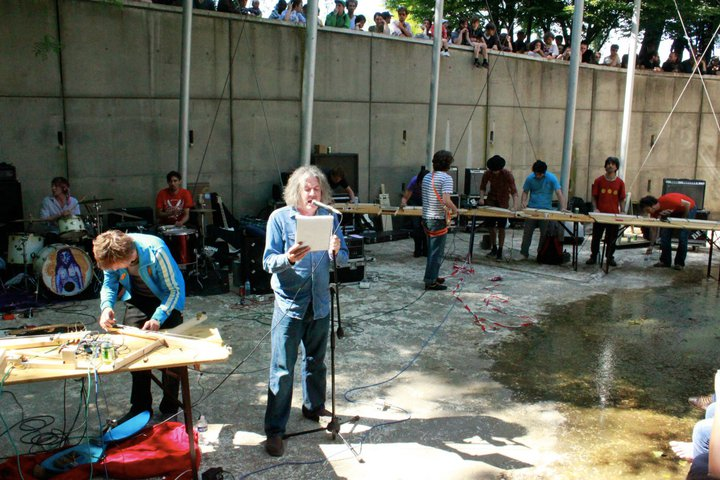
- Genre: Experimental, Noise rock, Electronic
- Dates: May
- Locations: Paris, France
- Years active: 2003-present
- Founders: Étienne Blanchot and Frédéric Mazelly
- Website: http://www.villettesonique.com

Villette Sonique is an annual music festival in Parc de la Villette in Paris, France, featuring a combination of experimental music, noise rock, electronic and other genres. The festival is usually held the last week of May.

The festival has a daytime open-air program which is free, and an evening portion in the two main concert halls of the musical venue in the parc (La Grande Halle). The festival grew from two days to five days. The first two editions were produced under the name "Feed Back", then the name changed to Villette Sonique. Since the festival happens in May, it features an overlap in its line up with Primavera Sound Festival and Bad Bonn Kilbi, which take place on the same weekend, and All Tomorrow's Parties, which takes place a week before both festivals.

The festival started out as a two-day event in 2003 that featured Coil, LCD Sound System, The Bug, DJ Food and others.

== Line Ups ==
=== 2007 ===
- Bernard Parmegiani, Krikor, Pentile, Jamie Lidell, First Nation, Nurse With Wound, Christian Fennesz & Mike Patton, Black Devil Disco Club, Daniele Baldelli, D*I*R*T*Y* Sound System, Pascal Comelade-Bel Canto Orquestra, Múm, Zëro, Jens Lekman, Poni, Shit and Shine, Polysics, Uffie feat Dj Feadz.

=== June 3–8, 2008 ===
- Sunset Rubdown, Deerhunter, Marvin, Devo, Dimitri Plays-Philippe Azoury, NLF3, Six Organs of Admittance, Feadz, Cuizinier & Dj Orgasmic, Clipse, Martin Rev, Pilooski, Zombie Zombie, The Go! Team, Colleen, Kimmo Pohjonen, Viva and the Diva, Pan Sonic, Throbbing Gristle, Joakim, Shellac, Mission of Burma, Bottomless Pit, High Places, El Guincho, Sage Francis, Buraka Som Sistema, B. Dolan, Arnaud Maguet.

=== May 27–31, 2009 ===
- Men Without Pants, Sunn O))), The Jesus Lizard, Boy 8-Bit, Jesse Rose, Diplo, DJ Hell, Erna Omarsdottir, Extra Life, Mahjongg, Lightning Bolt, Duchess Says, Gaiser, Barem, Richie Hawtin, Magda, Ariel Pink, Black Lips, Liars, Salvatore Principato, Omar Souleyman, Deerhoof, Monotonix, Dan Deacon & The Ensemble, Ebony Bones, Goblin "plays Dario Argento soundtracks", Nisennenmondai, Liquid Liquid.

=== May 31 - June 6, 2010 ===
- Roy Harper, Joanna Newsom, Cassius, Danton Eeprom, James Holden, Vitalic, Yussuf Jerusalem, Polvo, Atlas Sound, Wolf Eyes, Acid Mothers Temple & the Melting Paraiso U.F.O., Om, Awesome Tapes From Africa, Oneida, Secret Chiefs 3, Ganglians, Blues Control, Arto Lindsay, Young Marble Giants, Owen Pallett, Marc Houle live, Troy Pierce, Magda, Richie Hawtin presents Plastikman Live, Kevin Martin, Fuck Buttons, Thee Oh Sees, Washed Out, These Are Powers, Magnetix, Paper Jamz, Bo Ningen, Programme, Diamanda Galás, Manuel Göttsching, Oneohtrix Point Never, Sacha Gattino, Young Marble Giants-Steve Reich.

=== May 27 - June 1, 2011 ===
- The Fall, Caribou, Half Japanese, Action Beat, Thurston Moore, Animal Collective, Glenn Branca, Yuri Landman (Home Swinger workshop & performance feat. Jad Fair and Action Beat), Suuns, James Pants, Connan Mockasin, OOIOO, Emeralds, Discodeine & Thomas Bloch, Group Doueh, Oxbow, Blondes, Julian Lynch, Ducktails, Rebolledo, Pilooski, Appleblim, Matias Aguayo, Comus, Current 93, Gouter Sonique, Cheveu, The Books (replacing Forest Swords), Mami Chan, Hype Williams, James Pants, Busy P, Sebastian, Carte Blanche, The Feeling of Love, Tensnake and others.

== See also ==
- List of experimental music festivals
- List of indie rock festivals
- List of music festivals in France
