= Madalitso Band =

Malawian band

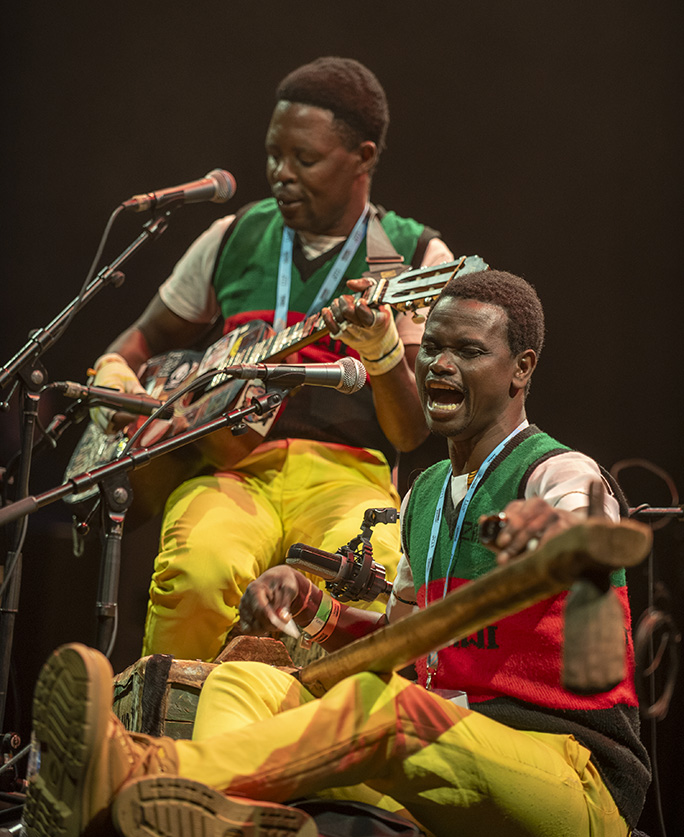
- Madalitso Band at WOMEX 2024

Background information
- Origin: Lilongwe, Malawi
- Labels: Bongo Joe Records
- Members: Yobu Maligwa; Yosefe Kalekeni

Madalitso Band are a Malawian musical duo comprising Yobu Maligwa on babatoni (a slide bass with one string), and Yosefe Kalekeni on four-string guitar and foot-drum. They have released four albums and toured in Africa, Europe, and the United States.

== History ==
Maligwa and Kalekeni moved to Lilongwe in 2002 during the Malawian famine of that year. In Lilongwe they formed a duo, originally called Tiyese and later renamed to Madalitso Band. Maligwa plays the babatoni, a slide bass with one string, and Kalekeni plays four-string guitar and a foot-drum. They performed as buskers for a decade before being seen by producer Emmanuel Kamwenje, who became their manager.

Madalitso Band's debut album Fungo La Nyemba was sold only at their concerts. Their second album, and first international release, was Wasalala, released on Swiss record label Bongo Joe Records in 2019. In 2022 they released the album Musakayike, again on Bongo Joe.

In June 2025 Madalitso Band released their fourth album Ma Gitala, which Stephen Dalton of Uncut called "effortlessly lovely." It made more use of a recording studio than their previous albums.

Madalitso Band have toured in the United States and in several countries in Africa and Europe. Their first performance outside of Malawi, described by Blantyre newspaper The Daily Times as their "breakthrough", was at the 2017 Sauti za Busara festival in Zanzibar.

Madalitso Band played at the Glastonbury Festival in June 2025, and performed a live televised set as part of the BBC coverage that weekend.

== Albums ==
- Fungo La Nyemba (Self-released)
- Wasalala (2019, Bongo Joe)
- Musakayike (2022, Bongo Joe)
- Ma Gitala (2025, Bongo Joe)
