= Neji =

Neji may refer to:

- Neji (horse), an American thoroughbred racehorse
- Neji, Iran, a village in Kurdistan Province, Iran
- Neji Hyuga, a character in the manga series Naruto
- Amagranoff Luozontam Ouv Lee Neji, a character in the manga series Blood Blockade Battlefront

== People with the given name ==
- Neji Jouini (born 1949), former Tunisian football referee

== See also ==
- Sorede Souzousuru Neji, an EP by the band Nisennenmondai
