= Azerbaijani Gitara =

Swiss compilation album series

Azerbaijani Gitara is a series of compilation albums released by Swiss label Bongo Joe Records. The albums compile music in the genre of Azerbaijani gitara, which was first developed in the 1960s as Azerbaijani musicians like Rafiq Hüseynov fused traditional genres such as mugham with western styles on Czech Jolana guitars. The first volume (2020) compiles music by Rüstəm Quliyev, a native of Nagorno-Karabakh who remains popular in Azerbaijan thanks to the YouTube channel run by his nephew. The second volume (2024) compiles music by Rəhman Məmmədli, one of the first players to replicate traditional vocals with heavy distortion on the electric guitar.

== Volume 1 ==
Azerbaijani Gitara

Compilation album by Rüstəm Quliyev
- Released: 18 September 2020
- Recorded: 1999–2004 in Azerbaijan
- Genre: Azerbaijani gitara
- Length: 43:58
- Label: Bongo Joe

Rüstəm Quliyev was born in 1969 in Kosalar, a village in Nagorno-Karabakh. In the 1990s he moved to Baku to escape the violence of the First Nagorno-Karabakh War. Quliyev's first instrument was the Azerbaijani tar, and from that background he developed a distinct sound on the electric guitar. Quliyev made a living playing at weddings and on Azerbaijani TV, and he remains popular in Azerbaijan, partly due to the YouTube channel run by his nephew Vasif Javadli. Quliyev died of lung cancer in 2005.

Azerbaijani Gitara was compiled by ethnomusicologist Ben Wheeler and anthropologist Stefan Williamson Fa, who also wrote the liner notes together. Wheeler and Williamson Fa's record label Mountain of Tongues had previously released several of the tracks on a 2019 cassette compilation of Quliyev's music.

=== Critical reception ===
Professional ratings
Review scores
Source	Rating
Songlines	4/5 stars
The Times	4/5 stars

In a review for The Times, Clive Davis called the album " one of the most unusual and exhilarating releases of the year" and "hypnotically danceable." Jim Hickson of Songlines particularly praised the tracks "Əfqan Musiqisi" and "Yanıq Kərəmi".

=== Track listing ===
No.	Title	Length
1.	"Ay Dili Dili"	3:58
2.	"Aman Tello"	5:21
3.	"Əfqan Musiqisi"	4:05
4.	"İran Təranələri"	4:51
5.	"Tancor Disko"	4:45
6.	"Fars Musiqisi"	6:21
7.	"Yanıq Kərəmi"	6:10
8.	"Neyçün Gəlməz"	4:28
9.	"Baş Sarıtel"	3:56
Total length:		43:58

=== Personnel ===
- Research and liner notes – Ben Wheeler and Stefan Williamson Fa
- Analog mastering – Tim Stollenwerk
- Artwork – Félicité Landrivon
- Artistic supervision – Cyril Yeterian
- Vinyl cut – Adi Flück

== Volume 2 ==
Azerbaijani Gitara Volume 2

Compilation album by Rəhman Məmmədli
- Released: 31 May 2024
- Genre: Azerbaijani gitara
- Length: 39:07
- Label: Bongo Joe

Rəhman Məmmədli was born in 1961, and played the garmoshka as a child. He learned to play electric guitar in the mid-1970s, and used it to play Azerbaijani folk songs and mughams with heavy distortion; he was one of the first to do so. Məmmədli currently teaches tar at a music school in Fuzuli. In Azerbaijan he has the nickname "the man with the singing fingers.

Azerbaijani Gitara Volume 2 was compiled by Ben Wheeler, Stefan Williamson Fa, and Cyril Yeterian, and released on Bongo Joe on 31 May 2024.

=== Critical reception ===
Professional ratings
Review scores
Source	Rating
Buzz Magazine	5/5 stars
Mojo	4/5 stars
PopMatters	9/10
Songlines	5/5 stars

Adriane Pontecorvo of PopMatters wrote that "in every song here, Məmmədli sets high standards in terms of creativity and continuity...the music here stretches wide the bounds of mugham, and Rəhman Məmmədli dazzles." Jim Irvin of Mojo called Məmmədli's playing "an extraordinary noise, an acidic tone dialed up in all directions...a stinging sound that could loosen your dentistry." In a 5-star review for Songlines, Jim Hickson wrote that "what is most astonishing is the sheer vocality that [Məmmədli] gets out of his guitar. At times there is an uncanny sense that the sounds he makes are literally that of a master singer." Francis Gooding of The Wire compared Məmmədli's sound to a "cat that has swallowed a laser cannon."

=== Track listing ===
No.	Title	Length
1.	"Qoçəlı̇"	4:04
2.	"Xal Qalmadı"	5:03
3.	"Yanıq Kərəmı̇"	5:20
4.	"Xarı Bülbül"	5:21
5.	"Qoca Dağlar"	5:37
6.	"Uca Dağlar Başında"	5:01
7.	"Leylı̇can"	4:35
8.	"Gəl Gəl Ey Gözəl"	4:03
Total length:		39:07

=== Personnel ===
- Research and liner notes – Ben Wheeler, Stefan Williamson Fa, and Cyril Yeterian
- Digitisation and scans from original tapes – Seb Thieme
- Mastering – Jean-Louis Morgère
- Vinyl cut – Adi Flück
- Artwork – Gaspar Capac
- Liner notes Layout – Félicité Landrivon
