= Levitation (Flamingods album) =

Studio album by Flamingods
- Released: 3 May 2019
- Studio: Total Refreshment Studios
- Length: 45:55
- Label: Moshi Moshi Records
- Producer: Kristian Craig Robinson

Flamingods chronology
Majesty (2016)	Levitation (2019)

Singles from Levitation
- 1. "Marigold" Released: 17 January 2019; 2. "Paradise Drive" Released: 14 March 2019

Professional ratings
Aggregate scores
Source	Rating
Metacritic	69/100
Review scores
Source	Rating
AllMusic	3.5/5 stars
DIY	3/5 stars

Levitation is the fourth studio album by Bahraini-English band Flamingods. It was released on May 3, 2019 through Moshi Moshi Records.

== Critical reception ==
Levitation was met with generally favorable reviews from critics. At Metacritic, which assigns a weighted average rating out of 100 to reviews from mainstream publications, this release received an average score of 69, based on 5 reviews.

== Track listing ==
No.	Title	Length
1.	"Paradise Drive"	5:04
2.	"Koray"	3:11
3.	"Marigold"	3:40
4.	"Astral Plane"	3:14
5.	"Peaches"	4:08
6.	"Moonshine on Water"	1:46
7.	"Olympia"	3:33
8.	"Club Coco"	3:29
9.	"Mantra East"	6:04
10.	"Nizwa"	4:01
11.	"Levitation"	7:45

== Charts ==
Chart	Peak position
UK Independent Albums (OCC)	40
