= Flamingods =

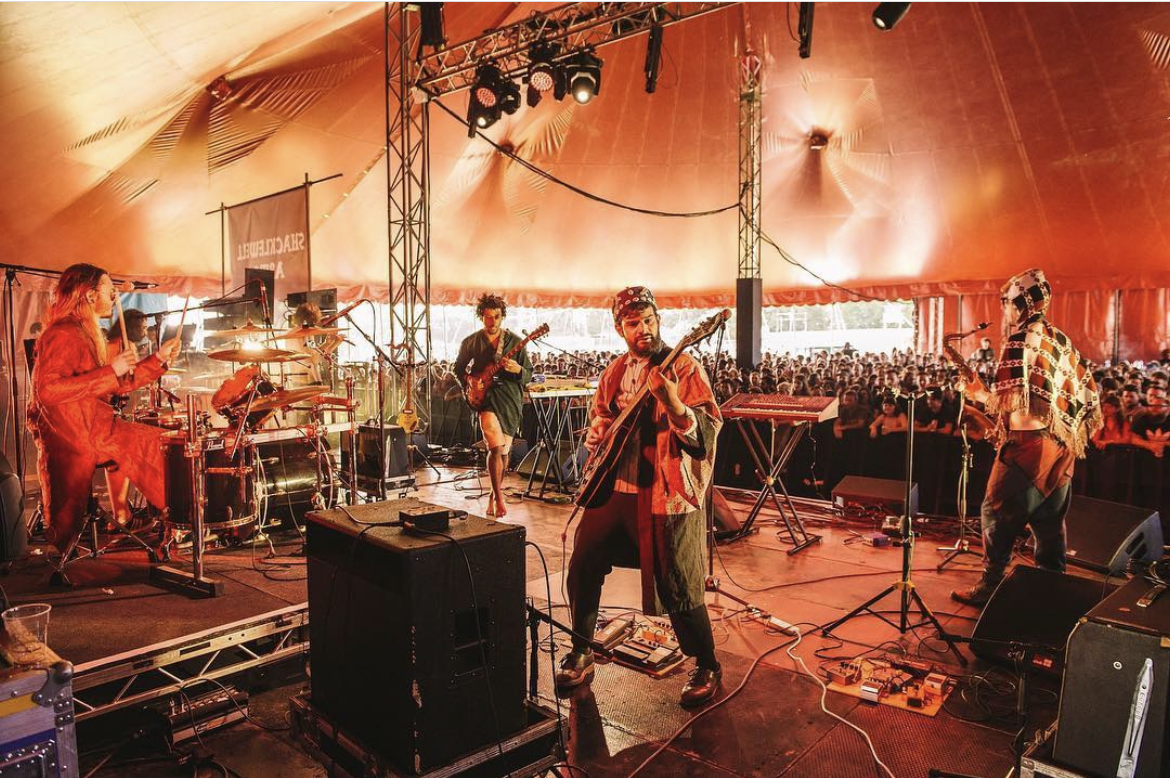
- Flamingods on stage at Field Day Festival, London 2017

Background information
- Origin: London, United Kingdom
- Genres: Psychedelic rock; alternative rock
- Years active: 2010–present (hiatus since 2024)
- Labels: Moshi Moshi; Speedy Wunderground; Soundway; Shape; Art is Hard
- Members: Kamal Rasool; Charles Prest; Karthik Poduval; Sam Rowe
- Past members: Craig Doporto
- Website: www.flamingods.com

Flamingods are a four-piece alternative rock band from London and Bahrain founded by Kamal Rasool in 2010. The band's other members are Karthik Poduval, Sam Rowe and Charles Prest (a fifth member, Craig Doporto, operated with the band from 2011 to 2016).

The band weaves through genres of psychedelia, new wave, electronica and punk whilst notably taking influence from their unique cultural heritages. They are known for rotating positions during their live sets, with each member swapping instruments in between tracks, moving around and evolving as the set goes on.

== History ==
The band grew up together in Bahrain, playing music in various guises since the age of sixteen. When Rasool moved to London to study music, he recruited his friends from Bahrain who were also studying in the UK. During ATP festival in 2010, the band played together for the first time. In 2010 and 2011, the group released two EPs entitled Sun and Away.

Flamingods' debut album, Sun, was released in 2013 by indie label Art is Hard. The album was a reimagining of their EP of the same name. The single "Quesso" featured ex-Ponytail member Dustin Wong on lead guitar. Around this time, the UK government put in place new visa laws which forced Rasool to move back to his home country of Bahrain after university.

=== Hyperborea (2014) ===
After being forced to leave the UK, Rasool moved to Dubai and worked for an independent magazine and coffee shop. However, the group continued to work on new music, and created an album despite the members not being able to play together. This became the band's second album Hyperborea, released through Shape Records.

Hyperborea received positive reviews from critics, notably from NME Magazine who gave the album an 8/10, noting "African rhythms and soundscapes cribbed from across the world music remit…it’s worth a visit." The band was also chosen as The Guardian’s "band of the week" describing the album as "otherworldly, globetrotting sound…impossible to pin down."

=== Soundway Records and Majesty (2016) ===
During the release of Hyperborea, Prest moved to Dubai to work with Rasool. The band were influenced by 1950s/60s exotica music, citing influences from artists like Les Baxter, Tito Puente, Arthur Lyman and others. Flamingods began to work on their third record Majesty, inspired by these new influences. In 2015, the group was invited to play at the West Holts stage at Glastonbury Festival. Miles Cleret, owner of the record label Soundway Records offered to release Majesty after being "blown away" by a set the band played on HMS Sweet Charity. Majesty was released in June 2016. It is a concept album split into two parts, Side A -Morning (tracks 1–5) and Side B-evening (6–10).

The album received mixed reviews, but was championed by BBC Radio 6 Music’s Gilles Peterson and Lauren Laverne who both invited the band to record live sessions on 6 Music. Other reviewers like PopMatters felt that the band's desire to be avant garde reduced the album's accessibility.

With Rasool and Prest both returning to the UK, the band was able to tour extensively across the UK and Europe in support of the album, landing slots at festivals such as Green Man, End of the Road Festival and Fusion Festival in Germany.

=== Moshi Moshi signing ===
In February 2017 the group signed with indie label Moshi Moshi Records to release their EP Kewali, a followup to their album Majesty the previous year. The band toured with the EP, appearing at SXSW in Austin for the first time. In the same year the band released a remix album of Majesty, which included remixes by artists such as Ibibio Sound Machine, Meridian Brothers and ex-Oasis member Andy Bell. The band also re-recorded a live version of their track "Hyperborea" from their second album with producer Dan Carey under his Speedy Wunderground label.

In January 2019, Flamingods released the track "Marigold" from upcoming album Levitation, which will be released by Moshi Moshi on 3 May 2019. The band have been announced as headliners of Are You Listening? Festival in Reading in April 2019.

=== Levitation (2019) ===
2019's Levitation was influenced by the band's exposure to funk, Turkish psych rock and other eclectic Middle Eastern and South Asian sounds of the 1970s. Levitation has so far received significant music press coverage, being positively reviewed by Line of Best Fit, MysticSons, BackSeatMafia, Loud and Quiet, SoundBlab, Selective Memory Mag, KEXP, and with interviews in Clash AllThingsLoud and Source, as well as in international media.

In print media, the album received 3/5 by Q magazine, 7/10 from Long Live Vinyl and 3/5 by DIY, and the band appeared extensively on radio including BBC Radio 6 shows with DJs Lauren Lavere, Mark Riley and Tom Ravenscroft.

In 2024, the band announced an extended hiatus, citing the cost of touring and sustaining a band alongside their personal lives and jobs.

== Discography ==
Studio Albums

- Sun (2013)
- Hyperborea (2014)
- Majesty (2016)
- Levitation (2019)
- Head of Pomegranate (2023)

Extended Plays

- Kewali EP (2017)

Remix Albums

- Moon (2015)
- Majesty Remixed (2017)
- Kewali Remixed (2018)
