= Cave (band) =

American psychedelic drone band

- Origin: Columbia, Missouri, United States
- Genres: Psychedelic, drone, krautrock
- Years active: 2006–present
- Labels: Important Records; Permanent Records; Drag City Records
- Members: Cooper Crain; Dan Browning; Rex McMurry; Jeremy Freeze; Rob Frye
- Past members: Rotten Milk; Adam Roberts; Zach McLuckie

Cave is an American primarily instrumental psychedelic drone band based in Chicago, Illinois, composed of guitarist/organist Cooper Crain, guitarist Jeremy Freeze, bassist Dan Browning, drummer Rex McMurry, and multi-instrumentalist Rob Frye. The band was formed in Columbia, Missouri, in 2006, and has released six full-length albums. Cave has toured widely in North America and Europe, and played the Pitchfork Music Festival in 2010.

== History ==
Cave was formed in 2006 as an informal collaborative project by Columbia, Missouri friends Cooper Crain, Dan Browning, and Rex McMurry, with Chicago native Rotten Milk. At the time, Crain and McMurry were also members of the now-defunct Missouri band Warhammer 48K. When Warhammer disbanded in 2008 the four began seriously writing and recording music together. Milk, 49, got his name while Cave was playing a show in Chicago and he spilled milk on stage. The story goes that Cave performed for so long that by the time they went to clean up the milk, it had already spoiled.

As described by Dusted Magazine, "Cave is primarily an instrumental band, but its members use their voices as an additional rhythmic element." Often referred to as psychedelic drone or "psych collective," the band's style is also heavily influenced by Krautrock. Cave are considered part of the "Columbia Diaspora", a group of bands with members from Columbia, Missouri who now reside in Chicago, including Mahjongg and Lazer Crystal.

In 2008 Cave released their first full-length album Hunt Like Devil/Jamz on Permanent Records. The following year they released an album on Important Records, Psychic Psummer, which received a positive review from Pitchfork Media and was described as "near-perfect" by AV Club. In 2010 they released an EP on Drag City Records, Pure Moods, which was reviewed favorably by Pop Matters and garnered mixed reviews from Tiny Mix Tapes and Pitchfork.

Cave's Pure Moods EP was followed in 2011 by their third full-length album, Neverendless, which was also very well-received, with Pitchfork stating that the album introduced a new "feeling of focus and structure in [Cave's] music." Shortly before the album's release, the band played a show from the back of a flatbed truck while driving through Chicago, garnering a glowing feature in the Chicago Reader. Video of Chicago flatbed truck show can be seen online.

Guitarist/organist Cooper Crain has also released material from his solo project Bitchin' Bajas on Permanent Records, and works with other Chicago bands as an analog recording engineer.

== Discography ==
=== Albums ===
- Allways (Drag City Records, 2018)
- Release (Drag City Records, 2014)
- Threace (Drag City Records, 2013) - LP/CS/CD
- Neverendless (Drag City Records, 2011) - LP/CS/CD
- Psychic Psummer (Important Records, May 2009) - LP/CS/CD
- Hunt Like Devil/Jamz (Permanent Records, 2008) - LP

=== EPs and singles ===
- "Party Legs b/w Thai I Am" Giradiscos 2012 - European Tour 7" Single
- "Flexi Summer Series" Rotted Tooth Records 2012 - 7" Single
- Pure Moods (Drag City Records, 2010) – 12" EP
- Made In Malaysia b/w Boneyard (Important Records, 2009) - 7" Single
- The Ride b/w BobbysHash (Static Caravan Records, 2009) - 7" Single
- Cave/California Raisins (Permanent Records, 2008) - split 10" EP
- Butthash b/w Machines and Muscles (Trensmat Records, 2008) - 7" Single

=== Cassettes ===
- CAVE singles : pre now (CAVE Tapes, 2010)
- Live 2009 split with Skarekrauradio (CumSun/CAVE Tapes, 2010)
- Raw Vibes (brah vibes) vol. II (CAVE tapes, 2009)
- The Patience Tape' split with Skarekrauradio (CAVE tapes, 2009)
- Raw Vibes vol. I (CAVE tapes, 2008)
- Jamz (CAVE tapes, 2006)
