= Aisha Duo =

Italian jazz duo

- Origin: Italy
- Genres: Jazz, avant-garde, new-age
- Years active: 1997–present
- Labels: ObliqSound
- Members: Andrea Dulbecco; Luca Gusella

Aisha Duo is an Italian jazz duo consisting of Andrea Dulbecco on vibraphone and Luca Gusella on marimba. They began working together while in the same percussion class at the Conservatory of Milan..The term "aisha" is an Arabic female name meaning "alive".

Two of the band's songs, "Amanda" and "Despertar", are loaded by default onto any computer with an installation of Microsoft's Windows Vista operating system.

Marco Decimo and Glen Velez appeared on Aisha Duo's album Quiet Songs.

== Discography ==
- Quiet Songs (ObliqSound, 2005)
