= Yin Yin (band) =

Dutch funk band

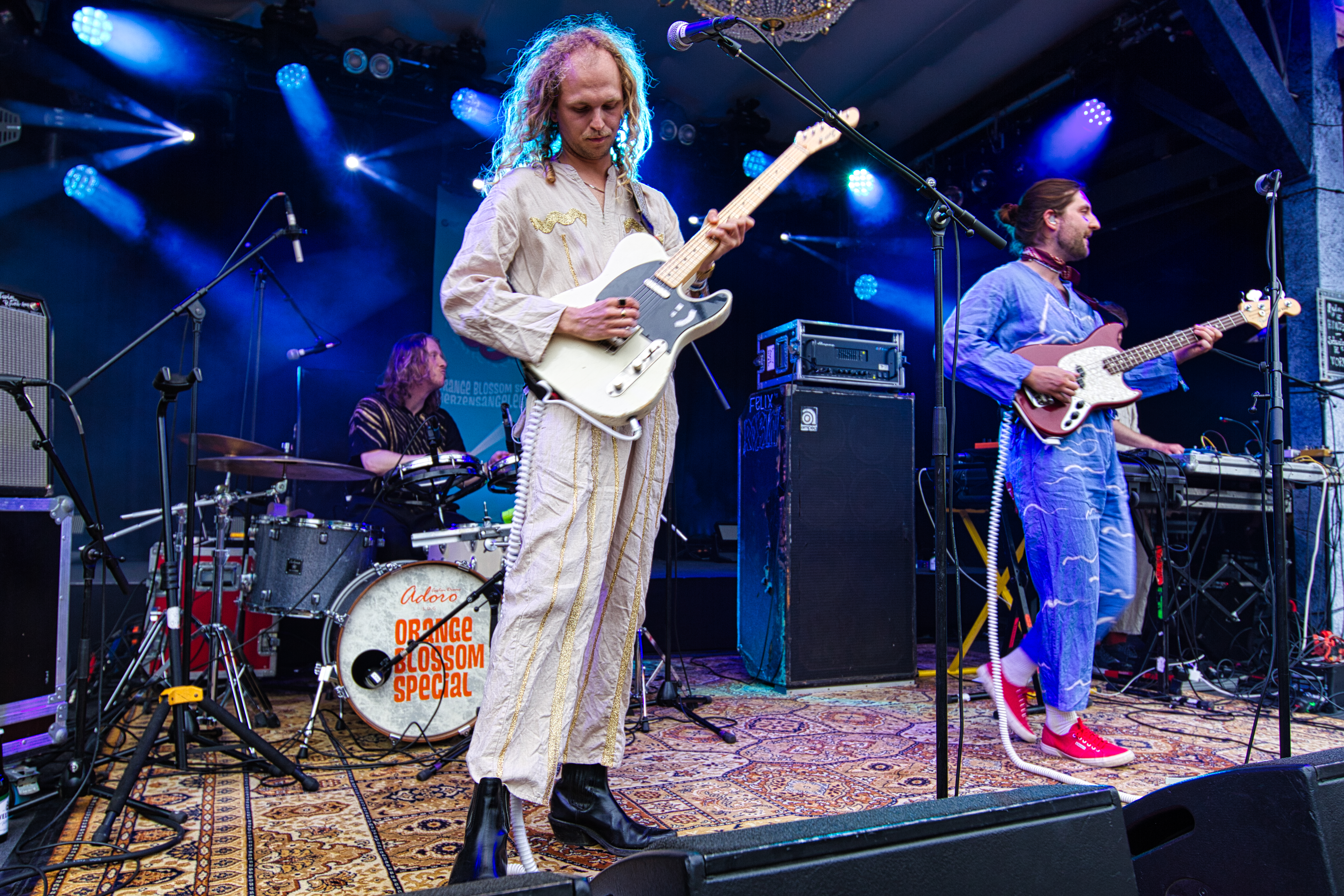
- Yin Yin in 2025. From left to right: Jerôme Scheren, Kees Berkers, Remy Scheren and Erik Bandt.

Background information
- Also known as: YĪN YĪN
- Origin: Maastricht, the Netherlands
- Genres: Psychedelia, funk, disco, Southeast Asian music
- Years active: 2017–present
- Labels: Bongo Joe Records, Glitterbeat Records
- Members: Kees Berkers; Remy Scheren; Erik Bandt; Jerôme Scheren
- Past members: Yves Lennertz; Robbert Verwijlen
- Website: yinyinternet.com

Yin Yin, stylized as YĪN YĪN, is a Dutch band formed in Maastricht, influenced by psychedelia, funk, disco and Southeast Asian music.

== History ==
Yin Yin was formed through a jam session between Yves Lennertz and Kees Berkers in 2017. Their initial recordings were in a ballet school, and they were subsequently joined by Remy Scheren and Robbert Verwijlen. Their first recording, Dion Ysiusk, was released in 2018. In 2019, Yin Yin released their debut full-length album, The Rabbit That Hunts Tigers, on Bongo Joe Records.

After growing in profile through a series of performances, including the Lowlands festival, the band's touring schedule was placed in hiatus following the start of the COVID-19 pandemic. During the lockdowns, they wrote and recorded The Age of Aquarius, their second album, which was released in 2022. Lennertz left the band in 2023, and was replaced with Erik Bandt. Taking new influence from Japanese music, Yin Yin released their third album, Mount Matsu, in 2024. On 10 January, 2025, the band announced the departure of Verwijlen, who was replaced by Jerry Scherry.

== Discography ==
=== Albums ===
- The Rabbit That Hunts Tigers (2019)
- The Age of Aquarius (2022)
- Mount Matsu (2024)
- Yatta! (2026)

=== EPs ===
- COLLIDE SESSIONS #8 (2023)
- Tam Tam (2023) (only issued in a limited physical copy, and has no official title)

=== Singles ===
- "Dion Ysiusk" (2018)
- "One Inch Punch" (2019)
- "The Grey Chamber of Hinachõ Otome" (2019)
- "Pingpxng" (2019)
- "Haw Phin" (2020)
- "Haw Phin / Chông Ky" (2020)
- "Nautilus" (2021)
- "Shēnzhou V." (2022)
- "The Year of the Rabbit" (2023)
- "Takahashi Timing" (2023)
- "Spirit Adapter" (2025)
