= Panic Shack =

Welsh band

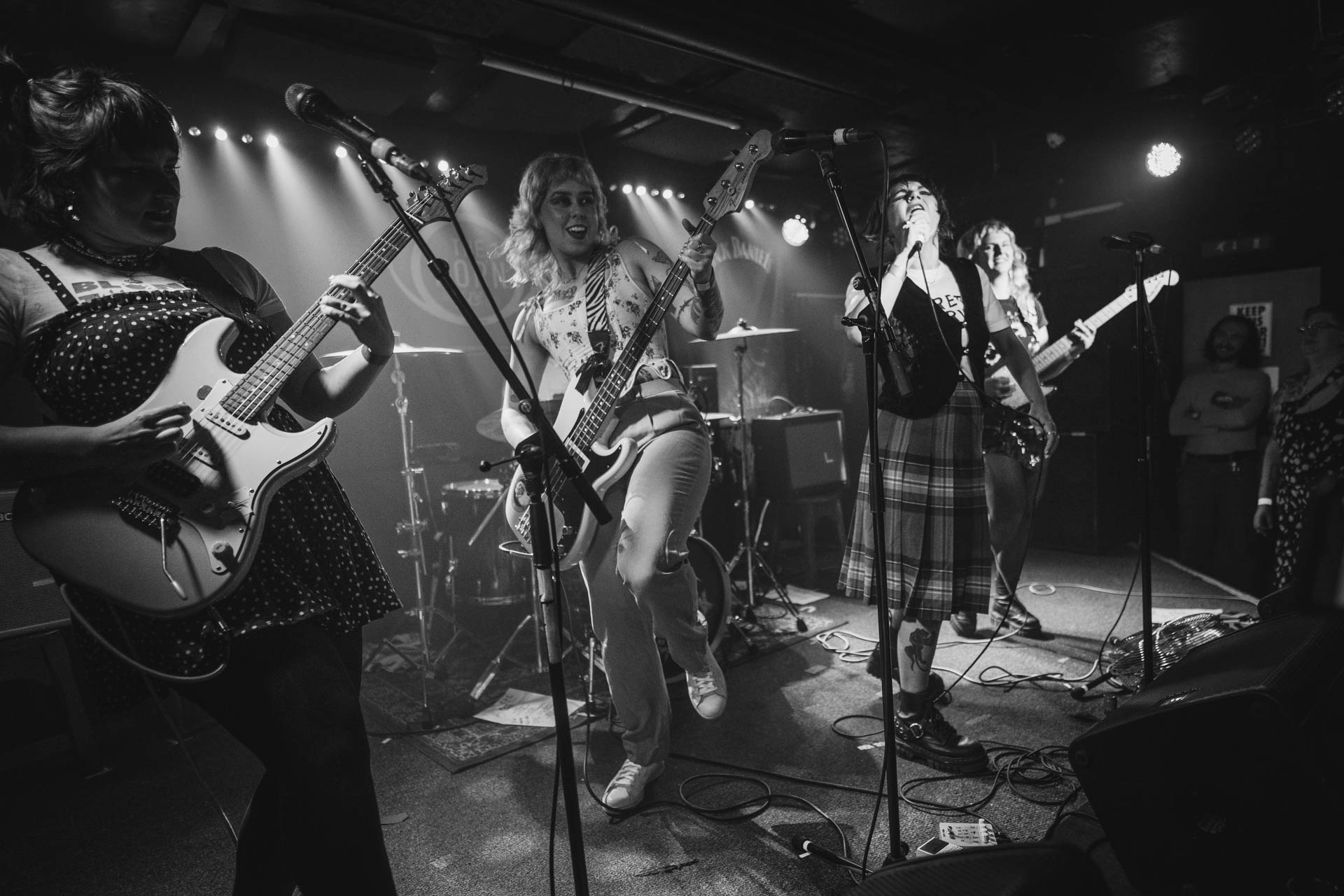

Background information
- Origin: Cardiff, Wales
- Genres: Indie rock, punk rock
- Years active: 2018–present
- Label: Brace Yourself
- Members: Sarah Harvey; Meg Fretwell; Romi Lawrence; Emily Smith; Nick Doherty-Williams
- Website: panicshack.com

Panic Shack are a Welsh band, formed in 2018 in Cardiff. The band consists of Sarah Harvey (lead vocals), Meg Fretwell (guitar, backing vocals), Romi Lawrence (guitar, backing vocals), Emily Smith (bass) and accompanied by Nick Doherty-Williams on drums.

== History ==
The band was formed in 2018 with their first releases in 2020: singles Jiu Jits You and I don't really like it. In April 2022 they released their debut EP, Baby Shack, on Brace Yourself Records. It reached a peak position of 92 on the UK Albums Sales Chart the following month. In 2025 they released their first studio album, Panic Shack, which reached No.32 on the UK Albums Chart and No.1 On The UK Rock & Metal Albums Chart. In 2026 they released the single Grin & Bear It with producer Ross Orton.

=== Tours ===
In 2023 they performed their first headline tour, at 13 different venues across the UK. Panic Shack opened for The Sex Pistols in Halifax and Cardiff in the summer of 2026, and have been announced as the opening act for during the first part of The Sex Pistols' 2026 North America tour.

== Discography ==
=== Studio albums ===
- Panic Shack (2025) – No. 32 UK Albums Chart

=== EPs and singles ===
- Jiu Jits You (2020)
- I don't really like it (2020)
- Baby Shack (2022)
- Grin & Bear it (2026)
