= Tobias Preisig =

Swiss violinist and composer (born 1981)

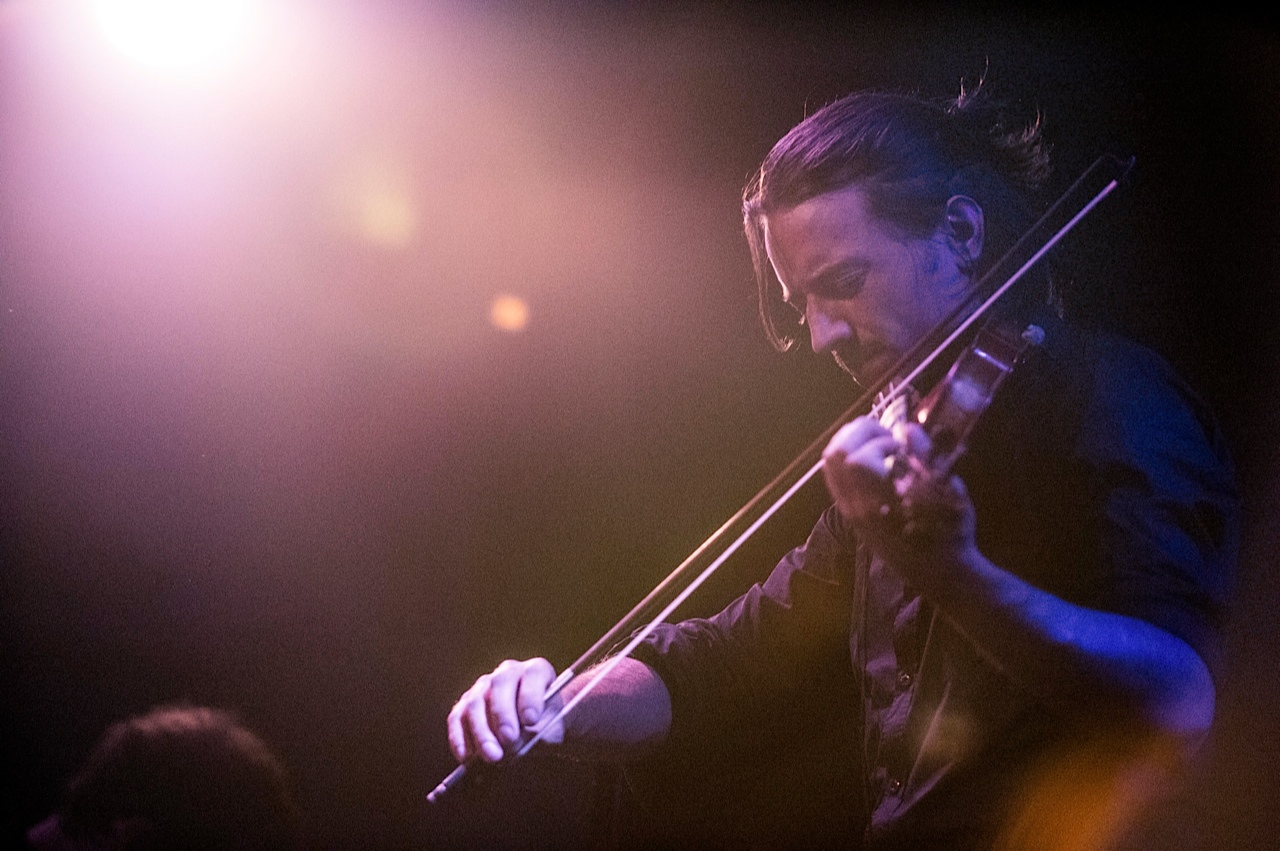
- Violinist

Background information
- Born: 18 September 1981 (age 45); Zurich, Switzerland
- Genre: Jazz alternative
- Occupation: Musician
- Instrument: Violin
- Labels: Traumton, ObliqSound, Qilin
- Website: www.tobiaspreisig.com

Tobias Preisig (born September 18, 1981, in Zurich) is a Swiss violinist and composer. His style can be described as alternative jazz or experimental improvised jazz.

He plays mainly with his electronica duo Egopusher.

== Tobias Preisig Quartet ==
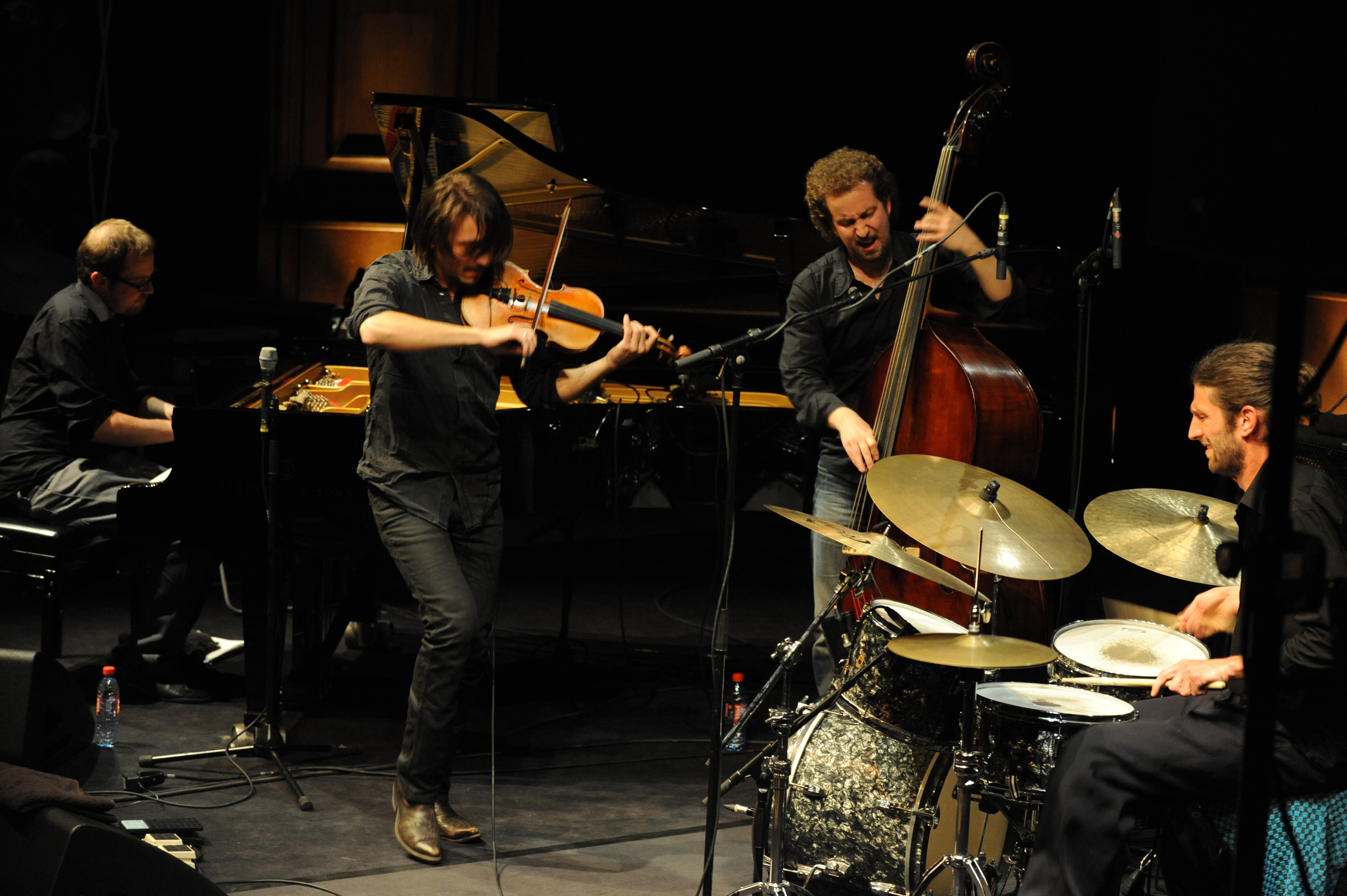
Tobias Preisig Quartet Tobias Preisig

The quartet formed in 2009 with pianist Stefan Aeby, bass player André Pousaz, and drummer Michi Stulz. Two albums have been released since then: In Transit (Traumton) in 2012 and Flowing Mood, (ObliqSound) in 2010. The band toured through Switzerland, France, Austria, Germany, Japan, and China, playing at festivals such as the Cully Jazz Festival, Hamburg's Überjazz, Basel's Offbeat, Jazz Festival Schaffhausen, Altstadtherbst Düsseldorf, JZ Festival Shanghai.

== Awards ==
- Pro Helvetia High Priority Jazz Promotion, 2013
- Cultural grant from the city of Zurich, 2012
- Cultural grant from the canton of Appenzell, 2005
- Generations Frauenfeld, 1998

== Discography ==
- In Transit (Traumton, 2012)
- Flowing Mood (ObliqSound, 2010)
