= Deli Girls =

American band

- Deli Girls performing at Pioneer Works in Halloween costumes, 2026

Background information
- Origin: Brooklyn, New York, U.S.
- Years active: 2013-present
- Label: Sweat Equity
- Members: Dan Orlowski, variety of producers
- Past members: Dani Rev, Rae Kelly
- Website: https://deligirls.bandcamp.com

Deli Girls is an American band fronted by Dan Orlowski and formed in 2013. Known for extreme live performances with explicit political messaging and "revelatory mosh pits," Deli Girls has been described as "noisy rave punk meets digital hardcore," "mall punk and nu metal," and "genre-agnostic cacophony." Orlowski formed Deli Girls with producer Rae Kelly, who left the band in 2022; Orlowski continued the project with producers and instrumentalists such as Dani Rev, Hatechild, and John Bemis.

== History ==
Deli Girls' 2019 release I Don't Know How to Be Happy was included in best-of-year lists by Clunk Magazine, Alt Citizen, The Morning News, and Impose Magazine, which also called them "NYC's best DIY act"; the album was featured in the Bandcamp Daily "Beginner’s Guide to Digital Hardcore," VICE "essential albums" of the first half of 2019, and led The Guardian to include Deli Girls in their "50 new artists for 2020." Impose Magazine included Deli Girls' album BOSS in their best albums of 2020, and The Fader highlighted Deli Girls' feature on LEYA's 2022 Eyeline mixtape.

In 2023, Deli Girls released a self-titled LP, a 13-track album featuring collaborators including Swan Meat, Manapool, Murderpact, Akafaë, and Dani Rev. The album is dedicated to Brytani Caipa, co-founder of "fundraving" collective Melting Point, known for genre-diverse parties, performance protests raising money for migrants rights, and its namesake goal to "melt ICE"; Caipa died in 2021.

Deli Girls' music has been used by activists at protests and online, and widely-circulated documentation includes video of the band performing at a Melting Point migrant rights protest outside of ICE's headquarters in NYC. In May 2024, Orlowski reported that Deli Girls were confronted over pro-Palestine visuals they asked to have projected during a set at Leipzig's TRIP Festival. After being repeatedly questioned and opposed by festival staff members, Orlowski told the audience what had occurred and the band played a noise set in protest.

== Discography ==
=== Albums ===
Year	Title	Label
2015	DEM0	
2016	deli girls	
2017	Evidence	Sweat Equity
2019	I Don't Know How to Be Happy	Sweat Equity
2020	BOSS	
2023	Deli Girls	
2026	Losing State	Industrial Strength Records
