= Black Sea Dahu =

Musical Band from Switzerland

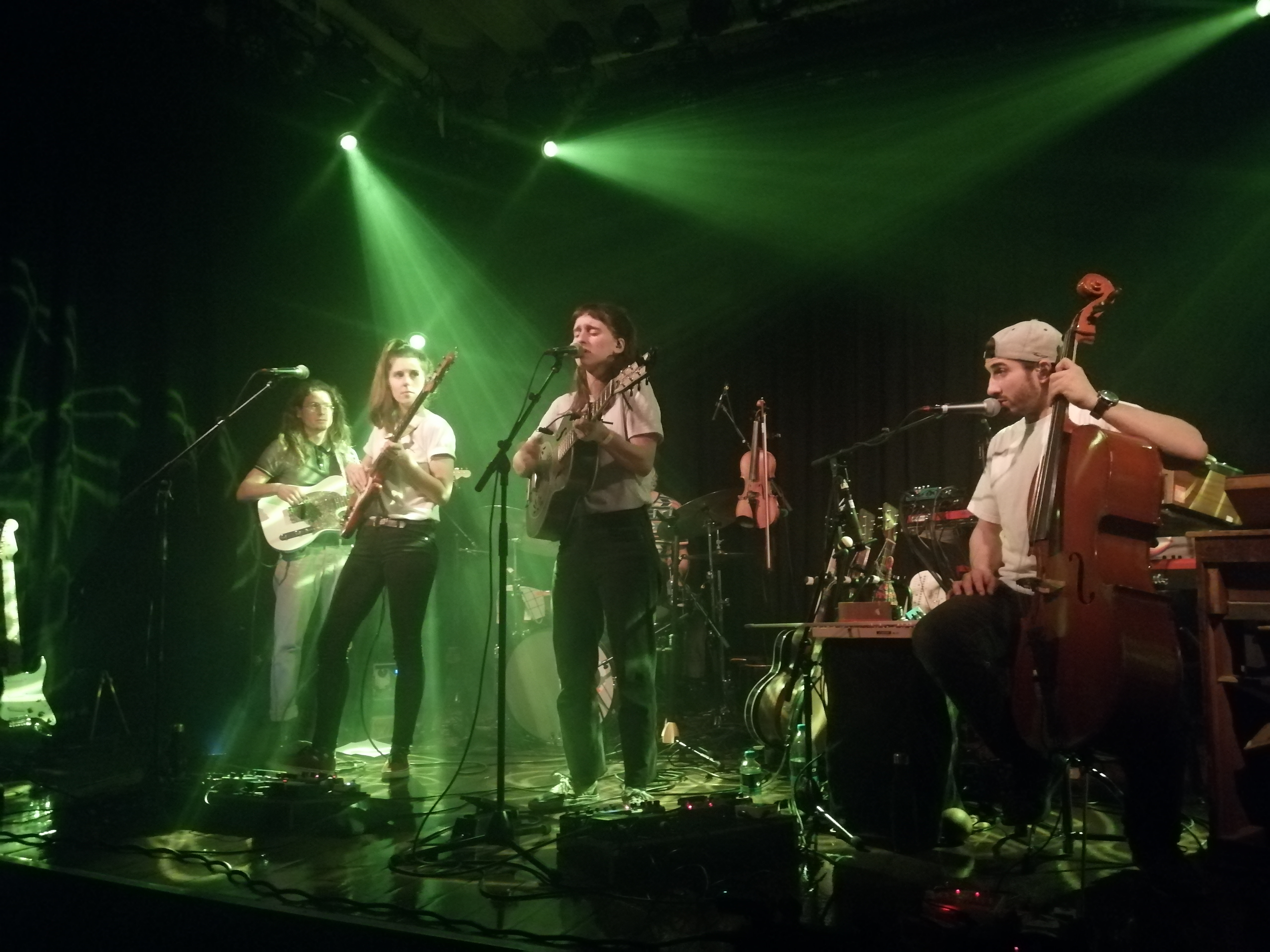
- Black Sea Dahu at Amsterdam Paradiso 16 Jan 2020

Background information
- Origin: Zürich, Switzerland
- Genres: Urban folk, indie-pop
- Years active: 2018–present
- Label: Mouthwatering Records
- Members: Janine Cathrein; Vera Cathrein; Ramon Ziegler; Pascal Eugster; Alon Ben
- Past members: Simon Cathrein; Paul Märki; Nick Furrer; Silvan Schmid
- Website: blackseadahu.com

Black Sea Dahu is a Swiss band formed by singer-songwriter Janine Cathrein. This seven-piece band consists of friends and family. Participating band members are her sister Vera Cathrein (bass, electric guitar, vocals, percussion, flute) and brother Simon Cathrein (cello, vocals, percussion), Silvan Schmid (drums), Pascal Eugster (electric guitar, bass) and Ramon Ziegler (keys, vocals, percussion). They're based in Zürich, Switzerland. Their musical genre could be described as contemporary, urban folk or Indie-pop.

The group has started out as Josh in 2012 and released one album and an EP under that name. In 2018 the band name was changed to Black Sea Dahu. The debut album White Creatures and the following EP No Fire in the Sand were recorded in Norway and released under the new name and received positive reviews internationally. Several tours at home and abroad and festival appearances followed.

In the autumn of 2019 the band released the EP No Fire in the Sand, including the single"How You Swallowed Your Anger", which tells the story of a someone who is heartbroken without any more love to give.

In February 2022, the second album I Am My Mother was released and received positive reviews. Meanwhile, Simon Cathrein is no longer present at live performances, yet only involved in the recordings of the albums.

== Band name ==
"Black Sea" is quoted from the lyrics of the song "White Creatures":

"White creatures looking after me, oh-ooh, I lost faith in the human I wanted to be, oh open black sea let me in, giant trees give me shelter in that haunted place."

The "Dahu" is a legendary and mythical creature that resembles a mountain goat and is well known in France and francophone regions of Switzerland and Italy.

== Gallery ==
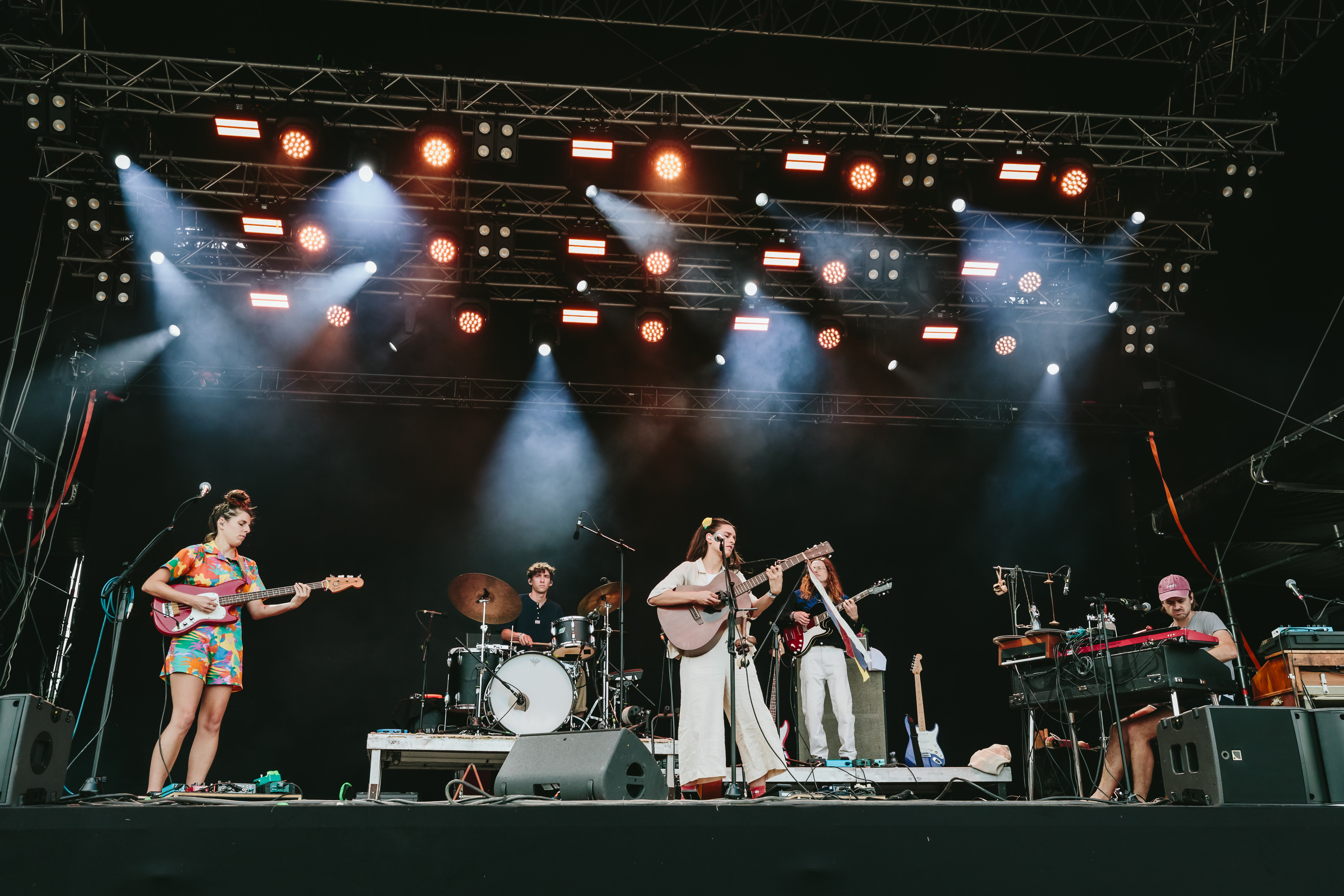
Rocken am Brocken 2023

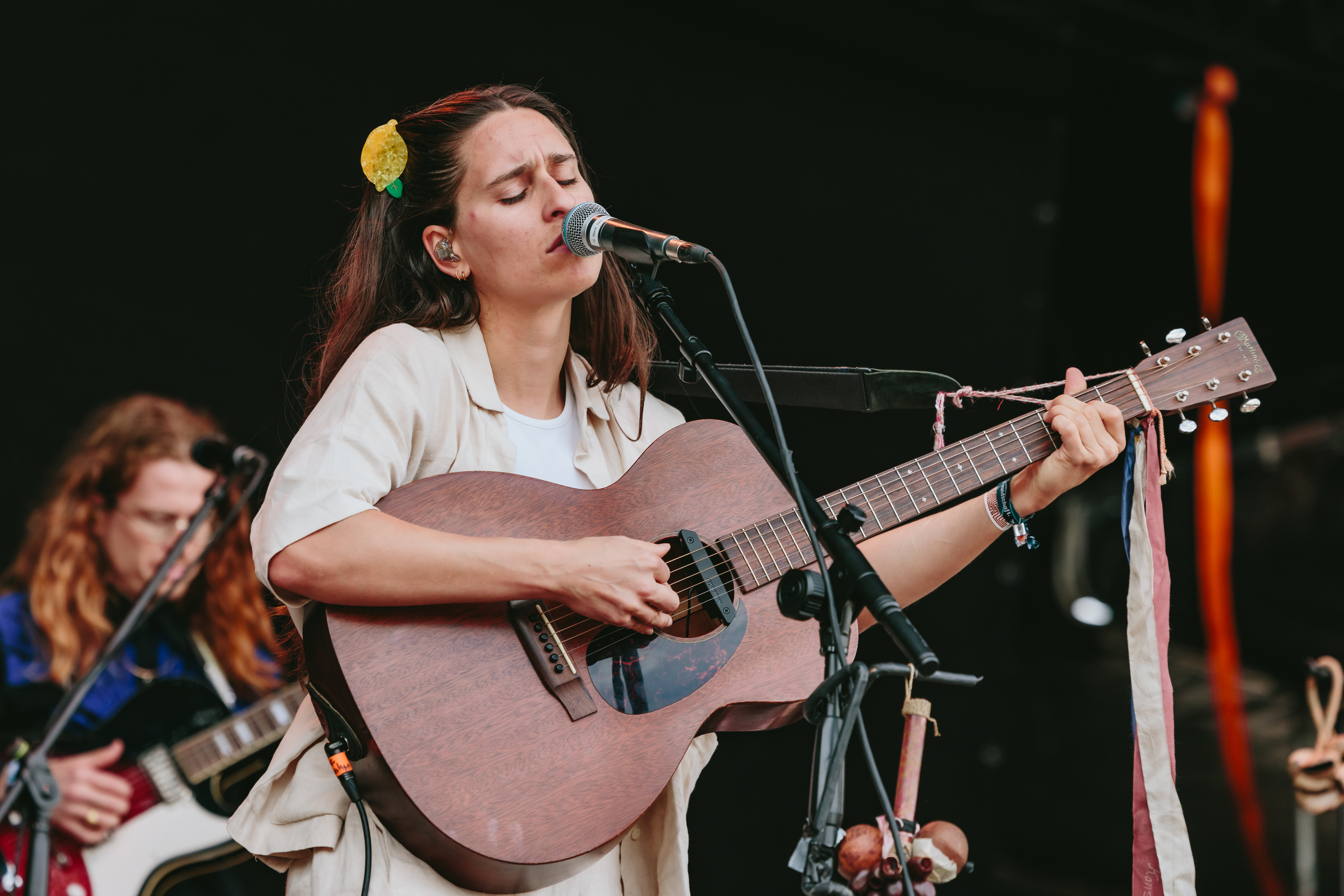
Rocken am Brocken 2023

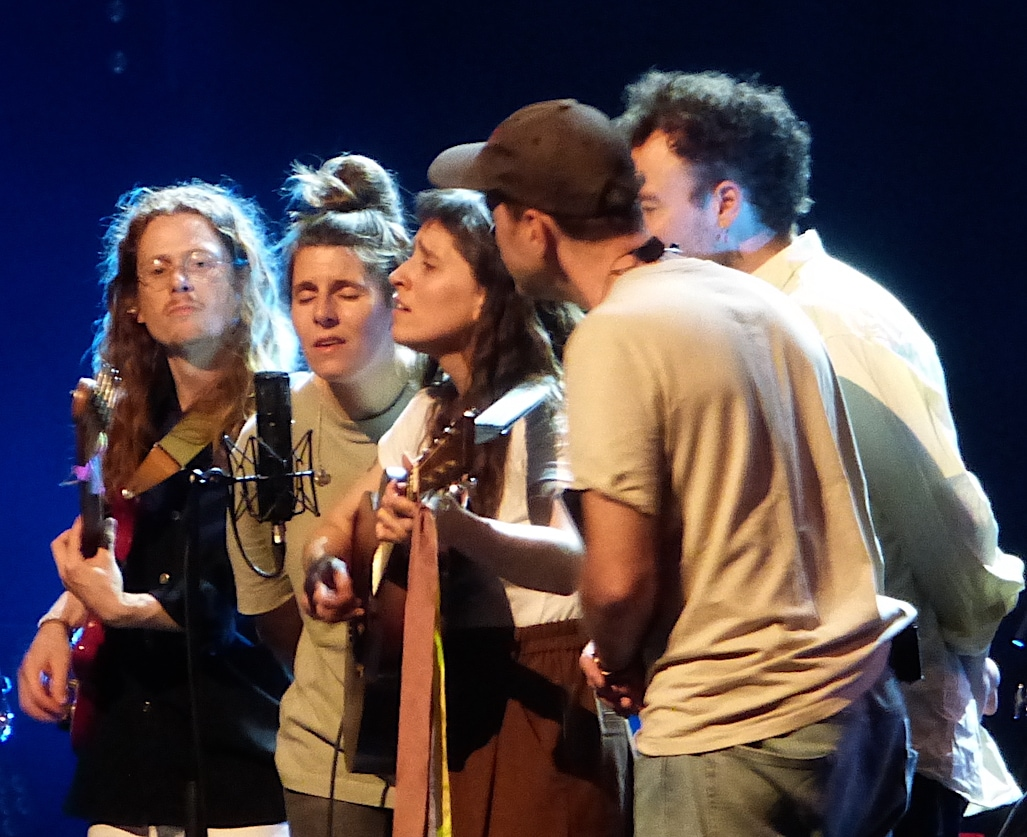
Karlsruhe 2025

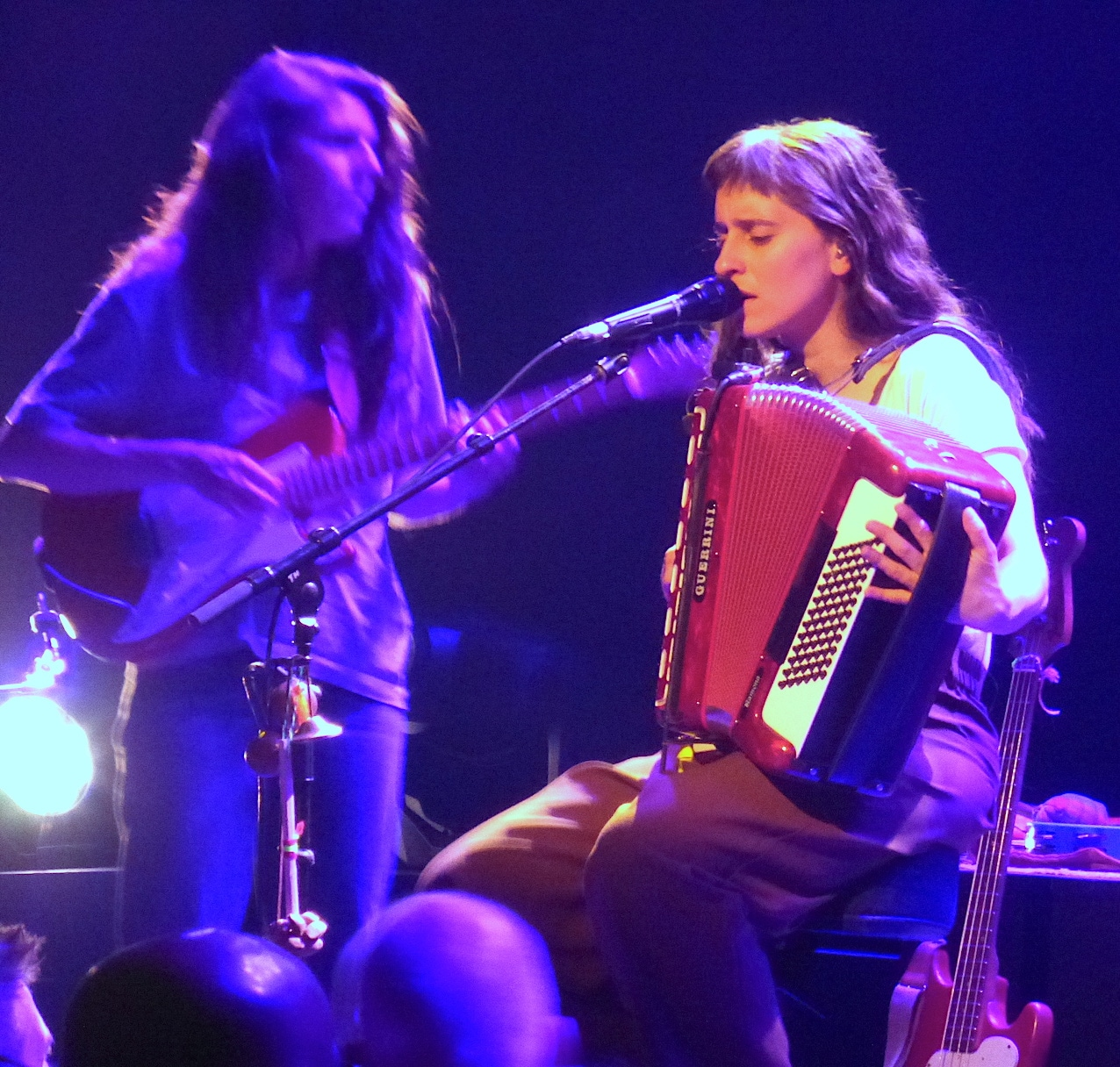
Karlsruhe 2025

== Discography ==
=== Albums ===
Title	Album details	Peak chart positions
Title	Album details	SWI
White Creatures	Released: 12 October 2018; Label: Mouthwatering Records	22
I Am My Mother	Released: 24 February 2022; Label: Mouthwatering Records	8
Live in Zurich and Bern	Released: 16 August 2024; Label: Mouthwatering Records	95
Everything	Released: 20 February 2026; Label: Mouthwatering Records	18

One album was released under the band's former name:

Year	Title	Band name
2012	The Kids of the Sun	Josh

=== EPs ===
Title	EP details	Peak chart positions
Title	EP details	SWI
Orbit (Instrumental)	Released: 2 June 2023; Label: Mouthwatering Records	—
Orbit	Released: 11 November 2022; Label: Mouthwatering Records	—
No Fire in the Sand	Released: 27 September 2019; Label: Mouthwatering Records	23

== Awards and nominations ==
The band won the 2019 Swiss Music Awards in the category: Artist Award.
