= Sorede Souzousuru Neji =

EP by Nisennenmondai
- Released: 2004
- Label: Dotlinecircle

Sorede Souzousuru Neji, generally referred to as simply Neji, is an EP by the band Nisennenmondai. The majority of the tracks on it are named after bands who influenced Nisennenmondai's music.

== Track listing ==
1. "Pop Group" - 6:20
2. "This Heat" - 8:04
3. "2534" - 1:11
4. "Sonic Youth" - 3:05
5. "Ikkyokume" (Neji Version) - 7:23
