= Station 17 =

- Origin: Hamburg, Germany
- Genres: Experimental rock, experimental, jazz fusion, krautrock, art rock, electronic
- Years active: 1988–present
- Labels: Mercury, Phonogram Inc., What's So Funny About.., Mute, 17, Bureau B
- Members: Ernesto Schnettler; Sebastian Stuber; Phillip Riedel; Christian Fleck; Siyavash Gharibi; Nils Kempen; Hauke Röh; Matthias Knoop; Philipp Wulf
- Past members: Marc Huntenburg; Saskia Tsitsigias; Felix Schnettler; Alexander Tsitsigias; Dirk Dresselhaus; Hoss Becker; Andreas Lehrke; Birgit Hohnen; Lenee-Rose Danganang

Station 17 is a Hamburg-based experimental rock group which was founded in 1989. The collective started as both a creative and social project and was the first to connect musicians with and without disabilities in the alternative music scene in Germany. On their first album, released in 1989, the group collaborated with a number of artists such as Michael Rother, Holger Czukay and F.M. Einheit among others and they developed a unique experimental sound.

In the following decades the band released eight albums on several European labels such as Whats so funny about, Mute Rec and later on their own label 17 Rec. They toured clubs and played festivals throughout Europe including: Kilbi Festival, Hurricane Festival, Burgherzberg Festival, Schiphorst Avantgarde.

Their last two efforts, „Fieber“ (2011) and the political disco album „Alles für Alle“ (2014) focused strongly on their fundamental idea of inclusion (all members of the group are qualified in a similar way, regardless of their disabilities). The German Federal Agency for Civic Education presented their concept of inclusion and music to a wider audience by interviewing the group on their website.

In 2012 the German Federal President Joachim Gauck invited them to play at the "Bürgerfest des Bundespräsidenten" in Berlin.

In 2013 they won an award for their music video to "Uh Uh Uh" at the OSKA Bright Film Festival.

The sound spectrum of the group contains a mixture of electronic, krautrock, disco, noise and pop. Their ninth album is scheduled for spring 2018.

== Discography ==
=== Albums ===
- Station 17 (1990)
- Genau So (1993)
- Scheibe (1997)
- Bravo (1999)
- Hitparade - Remix Album (2001)
- Mikroprofessor (2006)
- Goldstein Variationen (2008)
- Goldstein Variationen Remix (2011)
- Fieber (2011)
- Alles für Alle (2014)

=== Singles ===
- Station 17 / 不要表态 - Split (1993)
- Nadine/Fahrstuhl - Remixes by Console & Remute (2006)
- Drogen Sind Schlecht Für Die Haut - Remixes by Pelle Buys & Lawrence (2007)
- Goldstein Variationen #01 - Station 17 + The Robocop Kraus + Barbara Morgenstern / Remixes by Mense Reents & Thomas Fehlmann (2007)
- Goldstein Variationen #02 - Station 17 + Von Spar + Melissa Logan / Remixes by Sid Le Rock & Cab Drivers (2008)
- Goldstein Variationen #03 - Station 17 + Schneider TM + Ted Gaier + Melissa Logan / Remixes by kptmichigan & Erobique (2008)
- Goldstein Variationen #04 - Station 17 + Stereo Total + Michael Rother / Remixes by MyMy & Tobias Thomas/Ada (2008)
- Goldstein Variationen #05 - Station 17 + Fettes Brot + Knarf Rellöm Trinity / Remixes by Justus Köhncke & Christopher Just (2009)
- Uh-Uh-Uh REMIXES (2011)
