= Meridian Brothers =

Colombian experimental band

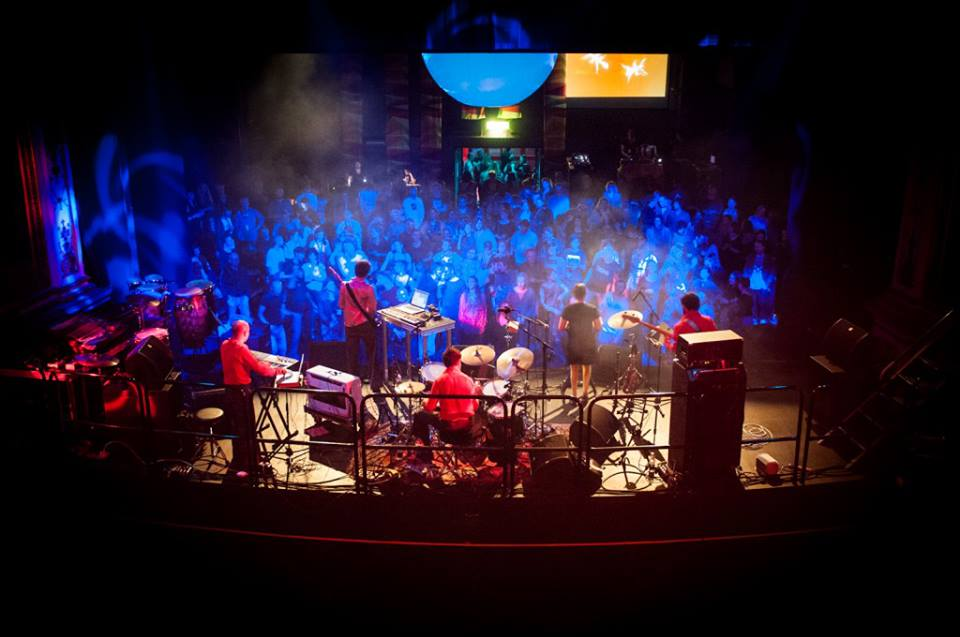

Background information
- Origin: Bogotá, Colombia
- Years active: 1998–present
- Labels: La Distritofónica, Discrepant, Soundway, Bongo Joe, Ansonia
- Members: Eblis Álvarez; María Valencia; Mauricio Ramírez; Alejandro Forero; César Quevedo
- Past members: Damián Ponce
- Website: www.meridianbrothers.com

Meridian Brothers is an experimental band led by classically trained Colombian musician Eblis Álvarez, who founded it as a solo project in Bogotá in 1998. The group mix electronic and avant-garde music with traditional Colombian music styles, particularly cumbia, vallenato, and salsa.

== History ==
Meridian Brothers was founded by Eblis Álvarez as a solo project in 1998, and he sold early recordings on cassette in Bogotá. While playing in short-lived group Ensamble Polifónico Vallenato, Álvarez began to use the Meridian Brothers project to experiment with traditional Colombian musical styles. Álvarez has said that "the first Meridian Brothers albums suck", and that the project found its feet with its first official release, Meridian Brothers V: El Advenimiento Del Castillo Mujer.

In 2007 the project became a band, with Álvarez being joined by four of his friends from Javeriana University: María Valencia (clarinet, saxophone and synthesizers), Damián Ponce (percussion, replaced in 2016 by Mauricio Ramírez), Alejandro Forero (keyboards), and César Quevedo (bass). The group released two more albums on Colombian record label La Distritofónica: Meridian Brothers VI in 2009, and Meridian Brothers VII in 2011, which was partially composed by a computer algorithm. In 2011 the Meridian Brothers played at Worldtronics festival in Berlin.

In 2012 Meridian Brothers released their fourth studio album Desesperanza on UK label Soundway Records. Also in 2012 DJ Gilles Peterson included the track Guarancha UFO on his list of the best tracks played on his BBC show that year.

In 2013 German record label Staubgold released Devoción, a compilation of tracks from Meridian Brothers' first three albums, and the group played Festival Estéreo Picnic, Roskilde Festival, and Rencontres Trans Musicales.

In 2014 Meridian Brothers released the album Salvadora Robot on Soundway Records, and played Villette Sonique, Paléo Festival, and Rock al Parque. Their next two albums, Los Suicidas in 2015 and ¿Dónde Estás María? in 2017, were also released on Soundway.

In 2020 Meridian Brothers released Cumbia Siglo XXI on Bongo Joe Records. Describing the album, Álvarez said "when I went to study composition I discovered algorithmic synthesis, a way to program synthetic generated sounds within an algorithm... but I didn’t do anything with that because I didn’t know how to take that and put it into Colombian culture. It wasn’t loud enough, or punchy enough, but eventually I managed to do it, and it was Cumbia Siglo XXI." In 2021 they released joint album Paz en La Tierra with fellow Bogotá band Conjunto Media Luna, also on Bongo Joe.

In 2022 the group released Meridian Brothers & El Grupo Renacimiento, a joint album with an imaginary salsa band. In 2023 they played Big Ears Festival in Tennessee.

== Discography ==
Albums

- Meridian Brothers V: El Advenimiento del Castillo mujer (2005, La Distritofónica/Discrepant)
- Meridian Brothers VI: Este es el Corcel Heroico que nos Salvará de la Hambruna y Corrupción (2009, La Distritofónica)
- Meridian Brothers VII (2011, La Distritofónica)
- Desesperanza (2012, Soundway)
- Salvadora Robot (2014, Soundway)
- Los Suicidas (2015, Soundway)
- ¿Dónde Estás María? (2017, Soundway)
- Cumbia Siglo XXI (2020, Bongo Joe)
- Paz en La Tierra (2021, Bongo Joe), joint album with Conjunto Media Luna
- Meridian Brothers & El Grupo Renacimiento (2022, Ansonia)
- Mi Latinoamérica Sufre (2024, Ansonia and Bongo Joe)

Compilations

- Devoción (Works 2005 - 2011) (2013, Staubgold)
