= Bongo Joe Records =

Record label based in Geneva

- Founded: 2015; 11 years ago
- Founder: Cyril Yeterian; Vincent Bertholet
- Location: Geneva, Switzerland
- Official website: www.bongojoe.ch

Bongo Joe Records, also known as Les Disques Bongo Joe, is a record label based in Geneva, Switzerland. It was established in 2015, and focuses on world music releases.

== History ==
Bongo Joe Records was founded in 2015 by Cyril Yeterian (who owns a record store of the same name in Geneva) and Vincent Bertholet. The label is named after Bongo Joe Coleman, an American street musician. Artists that Bongo Joe have released include Altın Gün, Meridian Brothers, and Yīn Yīn.

In 2025, Bongo Joe released the compilation album 2015–2025 Les Disques Bongo Joe: 10 Years of Sonic Explorations to celebrate a decade since their founding.

== Reputation ==
WOMEX named Bongo Joe one of the 20 top independent record labels of 2023. In a review of Bongo Joe's 10 year anniversary compilation album, Stephen Dalton of Uncut wrote that "much of Bongo Joe's catalogue also serves as valuable cultural archaeology, shining a contemporary spotlight on category-defying "post-world" music." PopMatters wrote that "an inarticulate harmony and a tasteful eclecticism hold their discography together."

== Notable releases ==
- Azerbaijani Gitara, a series of compilation albums by Azerbaijani guitarists.
  - Volume 1: Rüstəm Quliyev (2020)
  - Volume 2: Rəhman Məmmədli (2024)
