= Nisennenmondai =

Japanese rock band

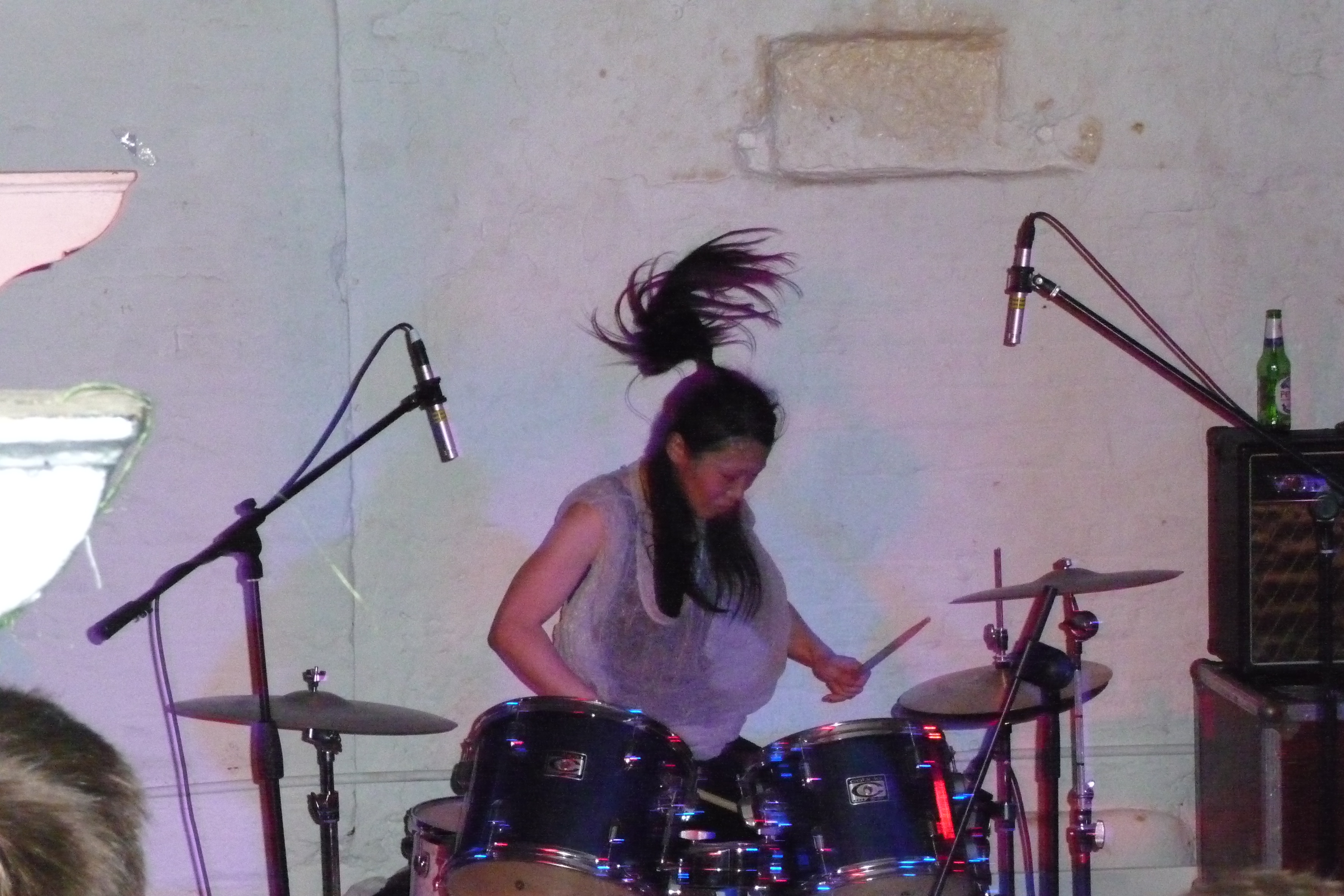
- Sayaka Himeno on drums for Nisennenmondai in 2009

Background information
- Origin: Tokyo, Japan
- Genres: Post-rock; experimental rock; instrumental rock; Japanoise; indie rock; noise rock
- Years active: 1999–present
- Labels: bijin record Dotlinecircle; Smalltown Supersound; Heartworm press
- Members: Masako Takada; Yuri Zaikawa; Sayaka Himeno
- Website: wearenisennenmondai.com

Nisennenmondai (にせんねんもんだい) are a Tokyo-based instrumental rock trio. They formed in 1999 and took their name from the Japanese translation of the then-current phrase "Y2K bug."

== Formation ==
Guitarist Masako Takada, bassist Yuri Zaikawa, and drummer Sayaka Himeno met at a club near their university and formed the band soon after. The band have mostly released music on their own Bijin label. The compilation album "Neji/Tori" was released by Norway's Smalltown Supersound in 2008. The band are known for their dynamic live show, and despite little mainstream media attention, have built a substantial international following. They have played dates in Australia, Austria, Croatia, Denmark (including Roskilde Festival), France, Germany, the Netherlands, Italy, Norway. Switzerland, Sweden, UK and USA. The band toured the US in 2004 and 2005. In April 2011 they performed on the main stage at Sonar Sound Tokyo. In May 2011, Nisennenmondai launched an extensive European tour.

== Style ==
Described by allmusic's Heather Phares as "taking as much inspiration from the cool kids at school as they did from experimentalists like This Heat, The Pop Group, Sonic Youth, DNA and Neu!" Nisennenmondai compose raw and repetitive (post) punk instrumentals, which can be groove-oriented whilst also having a no wave/disco vibe. Himeno tirelessly pounds at her snare and bass drum while slashing her cymbals, while Takada adds layers of delay and clangy sounding distortion.

"With walls of distortion and a pummeling rhythmic backbone that fluctuates between krautrock`s repetition and free-rock calamity, bassist Zai, guitarist Ma-Chan and drummer Hime have formed an unassuming juggernaut” (Dazed & Confused).

Prefuse 73 said in an interview with Dazed & Confused; "John Stanier from Battles had told me that they were sick. They start to play. Next thing you know, these three tiny diminutive women were making us look like idiots because they were so incredible". The band were chosen by Battles to perform at the ATP Nightmare Before Christmas festival, that they co-curated in December 2011 in Minehead, England.

== Discography ==
- 2004: Sorede Souzousuru Neji
- 2005: Tori
- 2006: Rokuon
- 2007: DJ nisennenmondai (bijin002)
- 2008: Neji/Tori
- 2009: Destination Tokyo
- 2009: Fan
- 2009: goA
- 2011: nobetsumakunashikodomotachi original soundtrack (bijin007)
- 2011: Live
- 2012: sounds before sleeping (bijin022)
- 2013: N
- 2013: Nisennenmondai EP (Zelone Records)
- 2014: no title (bijin025)
- 2015: N' (Bijin Record)
- 2015: Live at Clouds Hill
- 2016: #N/A (On-U Sound; On-U LP131)
- 2016: #6 12" Single (On-U Sound; On-U DP60)
- 2016: E (bijin028)
