= Mahjongg (band) =

American experimental rock band

- Origin: Columbia, Missouri, United States
- Genres: Experimental rock, dance-punk, worldbeat
- Years active: 2001–2011
- Labels: Cold Crush Records; K Records
- Members: Hunter Husar; Josh Johannpeter
- Past members: Jeff Carrillo; Caryl Kientz; Gabriel Wallace; Mikale De Graff; Dan Quinlivan

Mahjongg was a band based in Columbia, Missouri and Chicago, Illinois. Formed by multi-instrumentalist Hunter Husar and guitarist Jeff Carrillo in 2001, their sound combined guitar, synthesizer and computer manipulations with dense rhythmic textures derived from Afrobeat, funk, and post-punk.

Mahjongg released three full-length albums: Raydoncong (2005), Kontpab (2008) and The Long Shadow of the Paper Tiger (2010). They performed at the Pitchfork Music Festival and the Off Festival in Mysłowice, Poland. In December 2010 they played the All Tomorrow's Parties Festival curated by Godspeed You! Black Emperor.

== History ==
Mahjongg was formed in Columbia, Missouri in 2001 by University of Missouri students Hunter Husar and Jeff Carrillo. Drummer Josh Johannpeter and violinist/multi-instrumentalist Caryl Kientz joined the band later that year, and bassist Gabriel Wallace was recruited just prior to a 2002 tour.

In 2004 Mahjongg released the EP Machinegong on Cold Crush Records, a label co-run by Pretty Girls Make Graves bassist Derek Fudesco. Fudesco had been so impressed by Mahjongg's demo that he signed the band without having seen them perform. That same year Mahjongg relocated to Chicago, Illinois, becoming part of the "Columbia Diaspora" which included bands such as Cave, Warhammer 48K, Londo Mondo and Waterbabies. Their first full-length album, Raydoncong, was released on Cold Crush in 2005.

Both Machinegong and Raydoncong received positive reviews, and in 2008 Mahjongg released their second album Kontpab on K Records. The title is a portmanteau of avant-garde composer Karlheinz Stockhausen's "Kontra-Punkte" and the breakfast cereal Pablum. Vijles and Kientz left the band upon the release of Kontpab, to be replaced by Mikale De Graff and Dan Quinlivan. Carrillo moved to Nashville in 2008 and quit the band in 2009.

In 2008 Mahjongg released the single "Free Grooverider", which the band characterized as a protest song. Grooverider is a prominent drum 'n' bass DJ and producer who in 2008 was sentenced to four years imprisonment in Dubai for possessing marijuana.

From its inception, Mahjongg sought to break from post-punk conventions, incorporating Afrobeat rhythms, samples, dissonance and glitch into its sound. Everyone in the band sang, and Husar, De Graff and Quinlivin shared duties on synthesizer, computer manipulation, guitar and ancillary percussion. With the departure of principal guitarist Carrillo, the band moved towards a more dance-oriented sound. Their 2010 album Long Shadow of the Paper Tiger featured less guitar work and was more reliant on electronics and elements of techno and house music.

Mahjongg has collaborated with recording engineer Benjamin Balcom since 2003. Together they built a studio called Minbal which opened in February 2009.

Mahjongg played their last show with members De Graff, Quinlivan, and former guitarist Carrillo as part of the BitchPork festival on July 16, 2011. Founding members Hunter Husar and Josh Johannpeter formed a new two-piece band in 2015 called "HUJO".

== Other musical contributions ==
Mahjongg has played and recorded as Calvin Johnson's band the Hive Dwellers. Josh Johannpeter and Mikale De Graff are members of the band Lazer Crystal.

== Discography ==
=== Albums ===
- Raydoncong (Cold Crush Records, March 2005) - CD/LP
- Kontpab (K Records, January 2008) - CD/LP
- The Long Shadow of the Paper Tiger (K Records, July 2010) - CD/LP

=== EPs and singles ===
- Machinegong (Cold Crush Records, January 2004) – EP
- "Free Groove Rider" - (K Records, November 2008) – Single
