= Grammy Award for Best Jazz Instrumental Album =

Annual music award

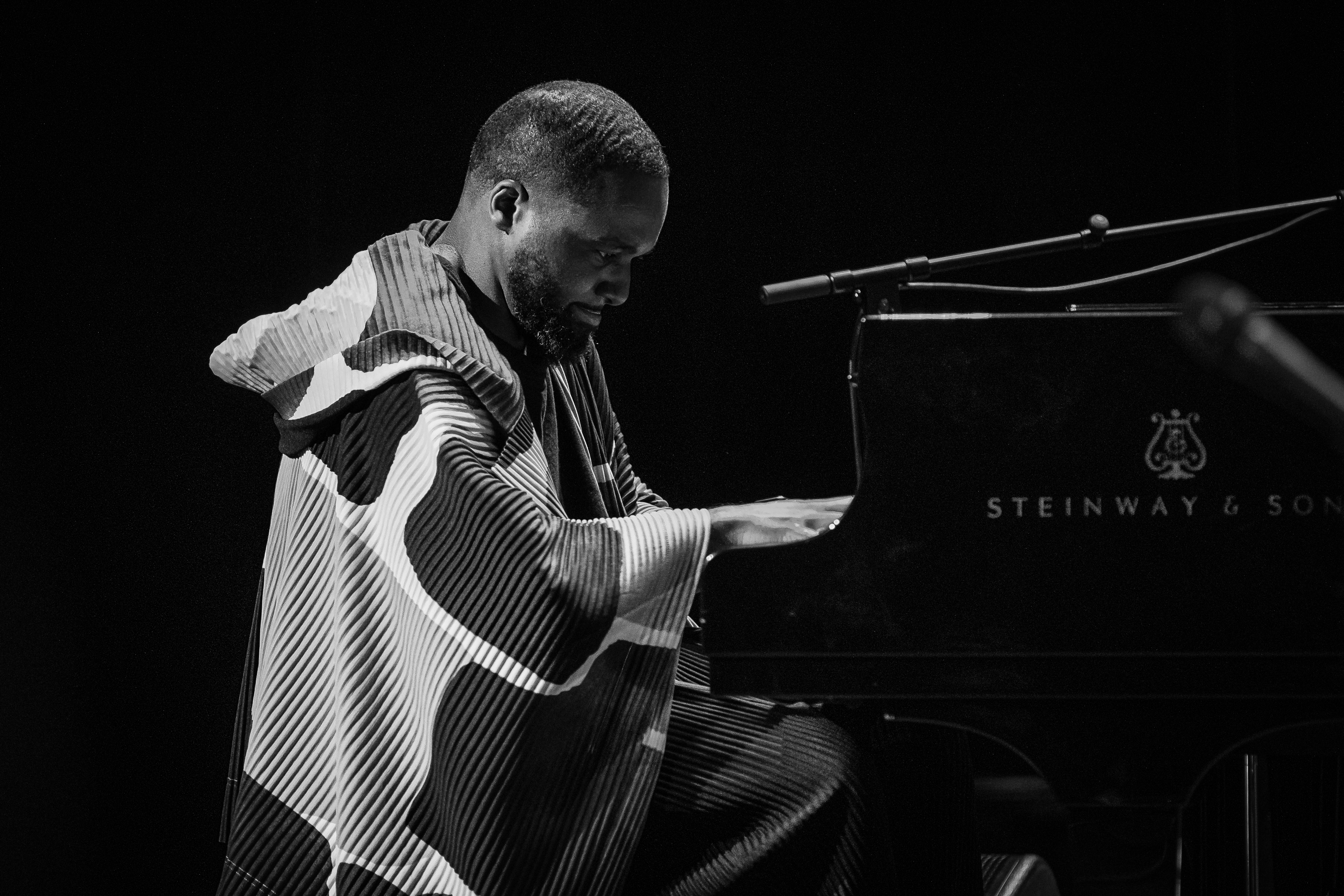
- Southern Nights by Sullivan Fortner (pictured) featuring Peter Washington and Marcus Gilmore is the most recent recipient.
- Awarded for: quality instrumental jazz albums
- Country: United States
- Presented by: National Academy of Recording Arts and Sciences
- First award: 1959
- Currently held by: Sullivan Fortner ft. Peter Washington & Marcus Gilmore – Southern Nights (2026)
- Website: grammy.com

The Grammy Award for Best Jazz Instrumental Album is an award that was first presented in 1959.

== History ==
From 1959 to 2011, the award was called Best Instrumental Jazz Album, Individual or Group. In 2012, it was shortened to Best Jazz Instrumental Album, encompassing albums that previously fell under the categories Best Contemporary Jazz Album and Best Latin Jazz Album (both defunct as of 2012). A year later, the Best Latin Jazz Album category returned, disallowing albums in that category to be nominated for Best Jazz Instrumental Album.

This category is meant for albums containing greater than 50% playing time of new instrumental jazz recordings.

Years listed indicate the year in which the Grammy Awards were presented for works released in the previous year. Before 1962 and from 1972 to 1978, the award title did not specify instrumental performances and was presented for instrumental or vocal performances. The award has had several name changes.

== Name changes ==
- 1959–1960: Best Jazz Performance, Group
- 1961: Best Jazz Performance Solo or Small Group
- 1962–1963: Best Jazz Performance Solo or Small Group (Instrumental)
- 1964: Best Instrumental Jazz Performance – Soloist or Small Group
- 1965–1966: Best Instrumental Jazz Performance – Small Group or Soloist
- 1967: Best Instrumental Jazz Performance – Group or Soloist with Group
- 1968–1971: Best Instrumental Jazz Performance, Small Group or Soloist with Small Group
- 1972–1978: Best Jazz Performance by a Group
- 1979–1992: Best Jazz Instrumental Performance, Group
- 1993–2000: Best Jazz Instrumental Performance, Individual or Group
- 2001–2011: Best Jazz Instrumental Album, Individual or Group
- 2012- : Best Jazz Instrumental Album

== Recipients ==
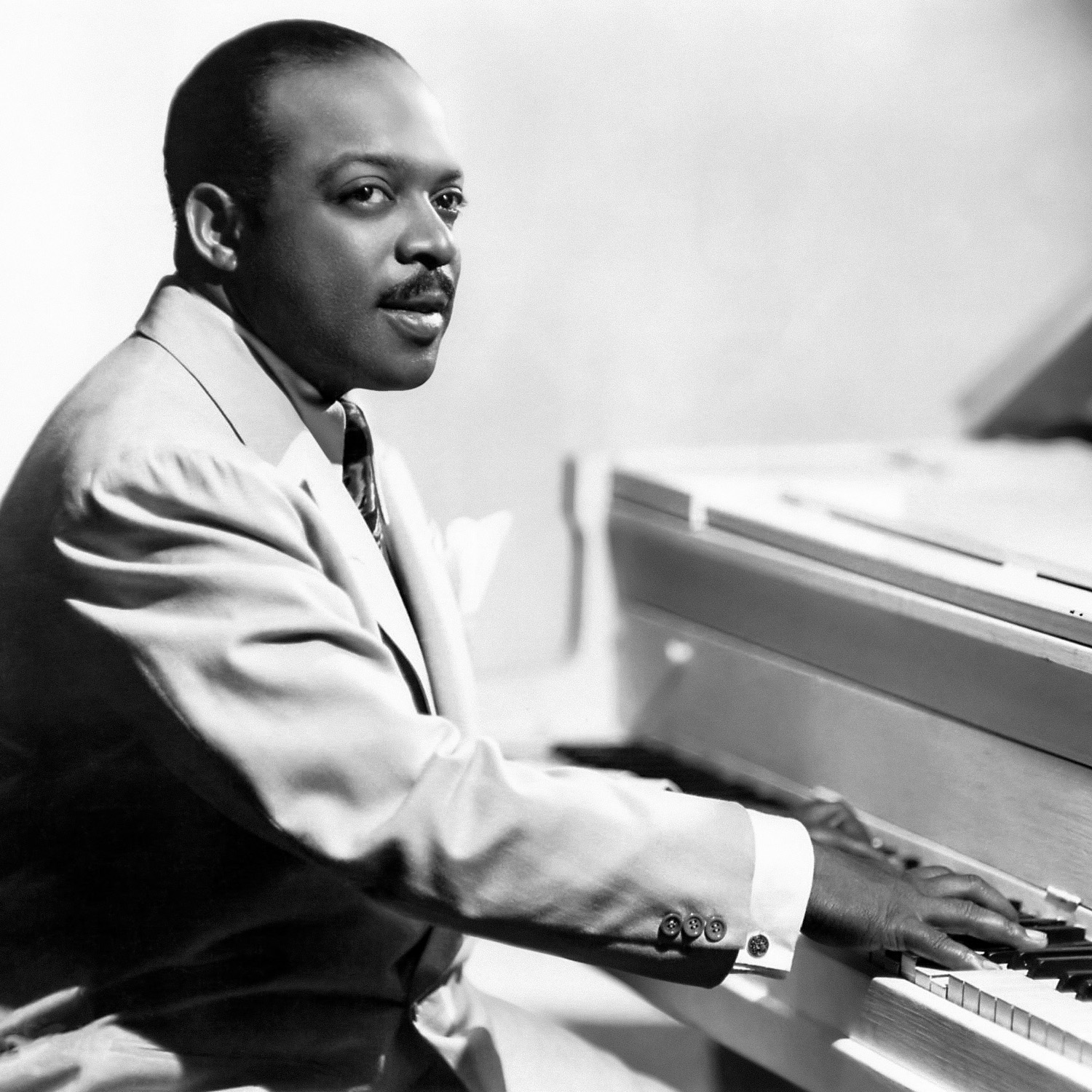
1959 winner Count Basie.

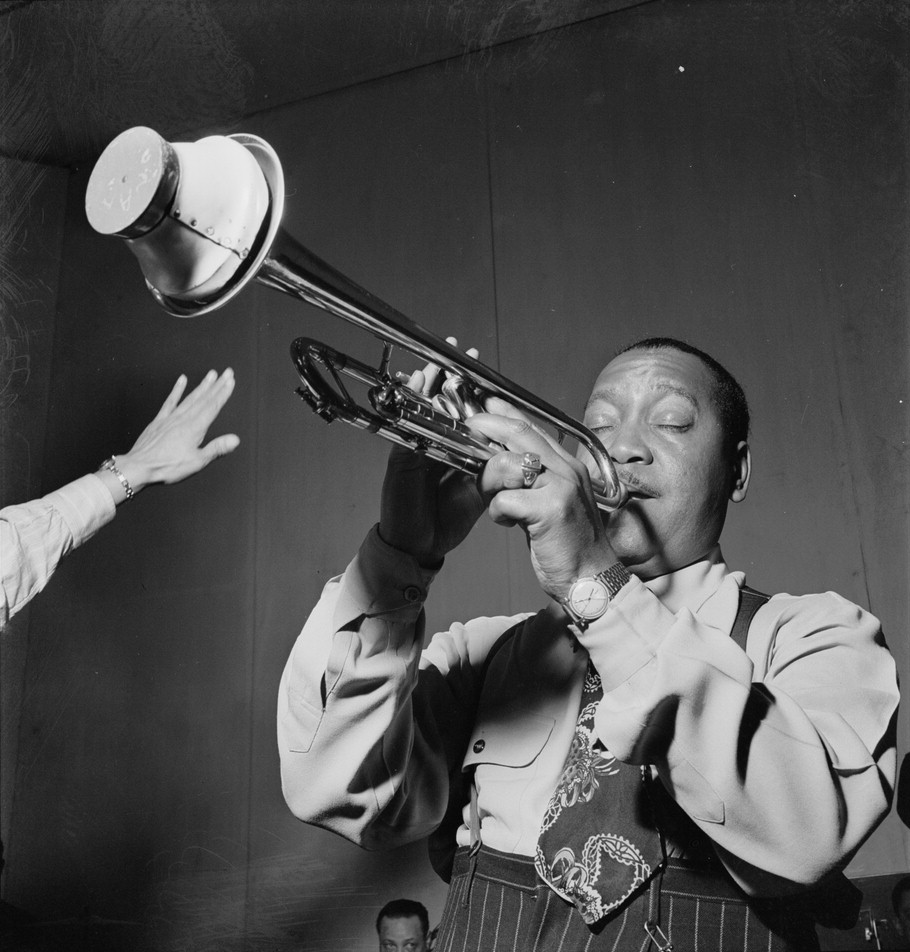
1960 winner Jonah Jones.

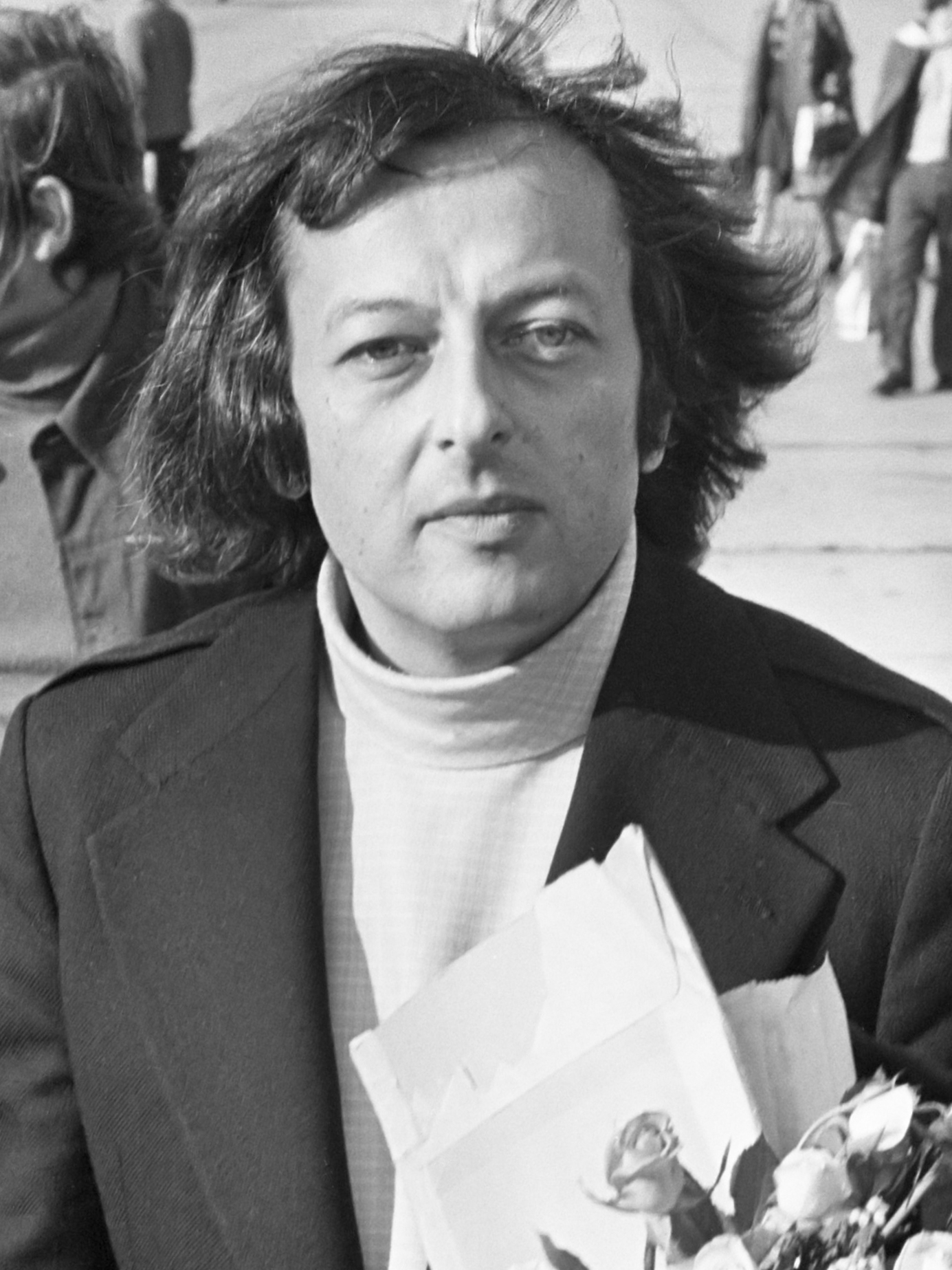
Two-time winner André Previn.

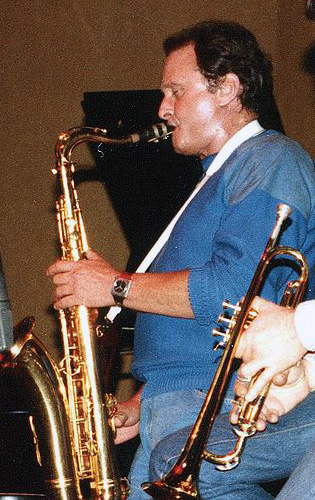
Two-time winner Stan Getz.

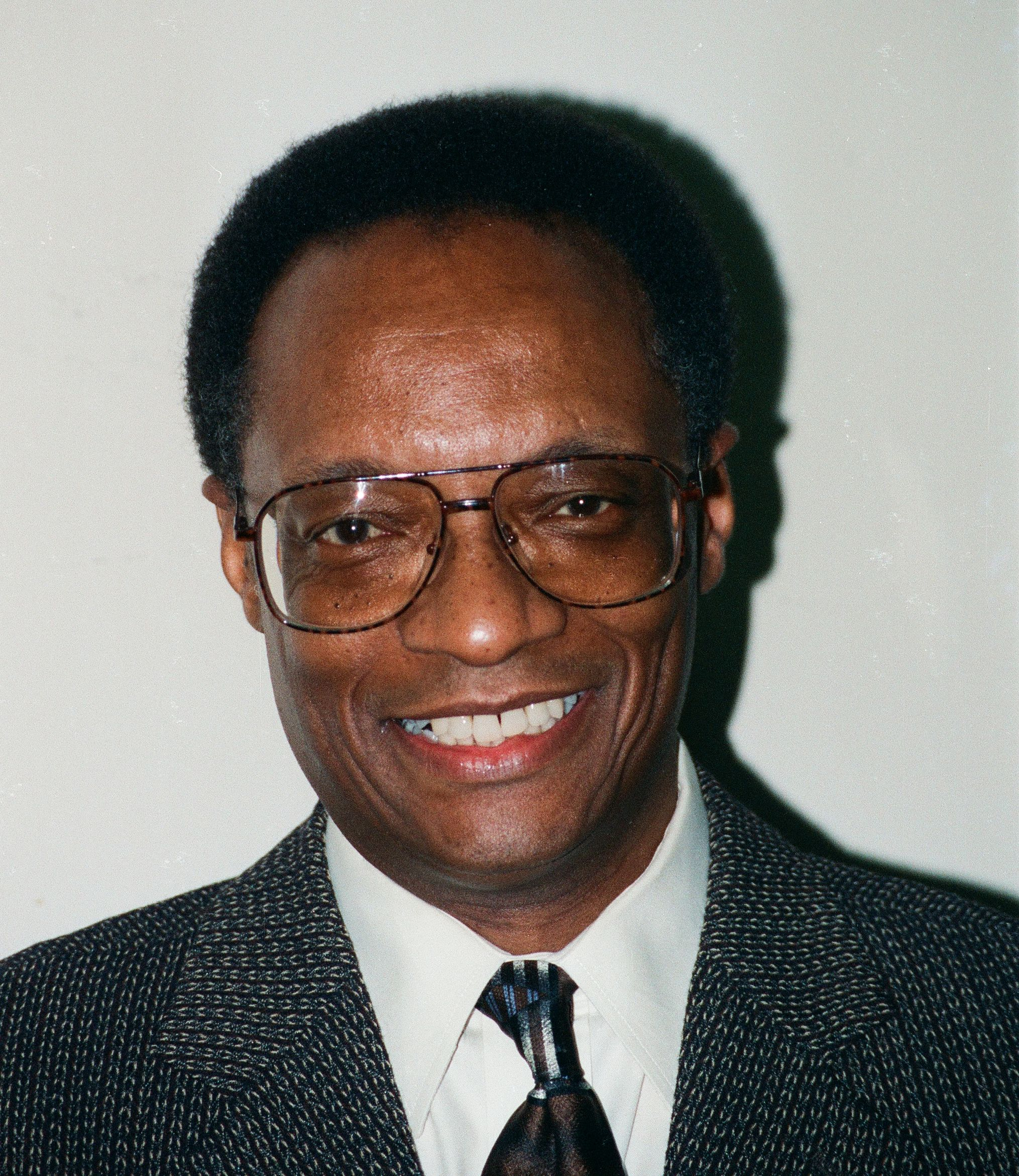
1966 winner Ramsey Lewis.

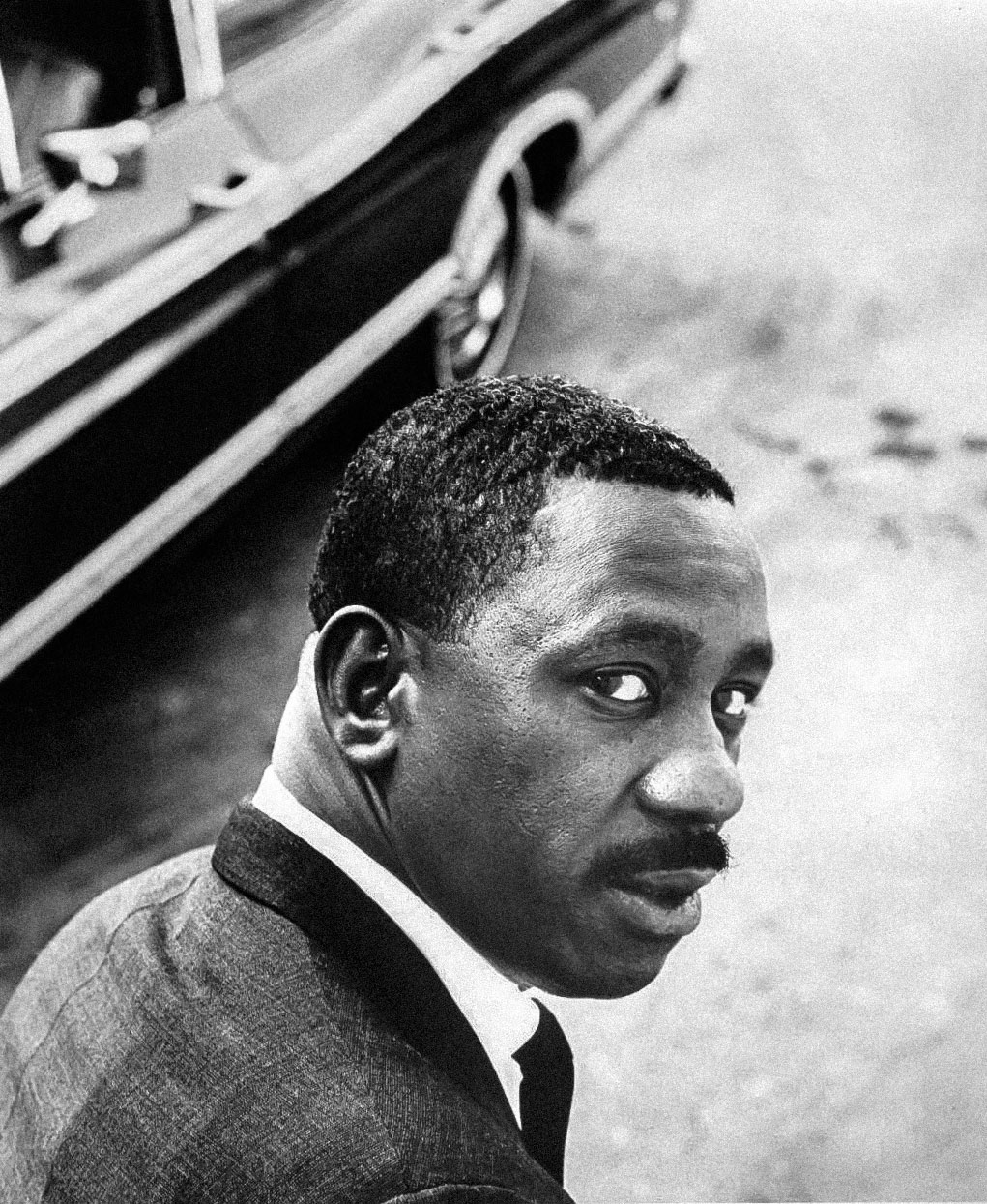
Two-time winner Wes Montgomery.

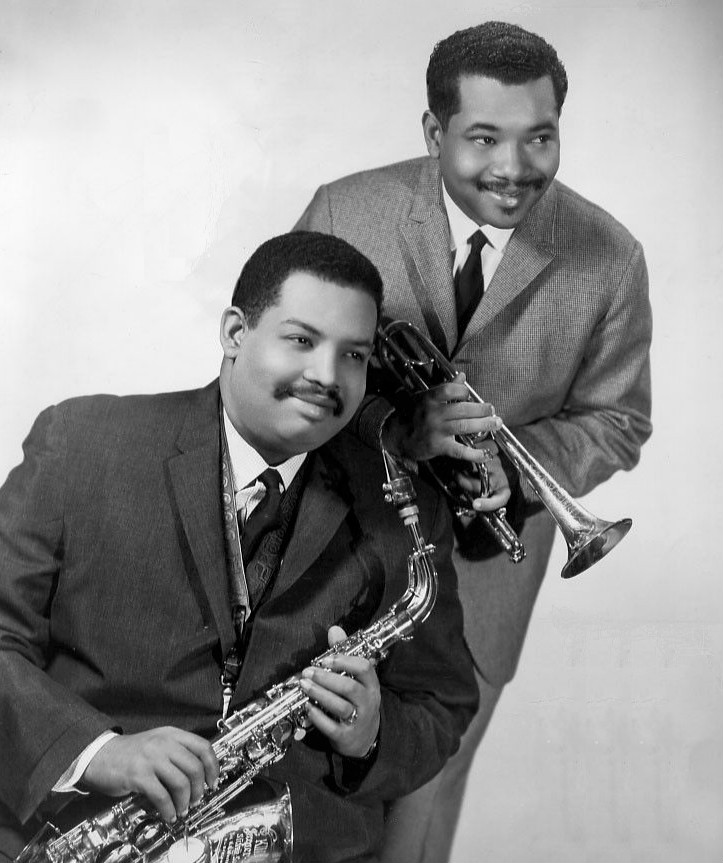
1968 winner Cannonball Adderley (left).

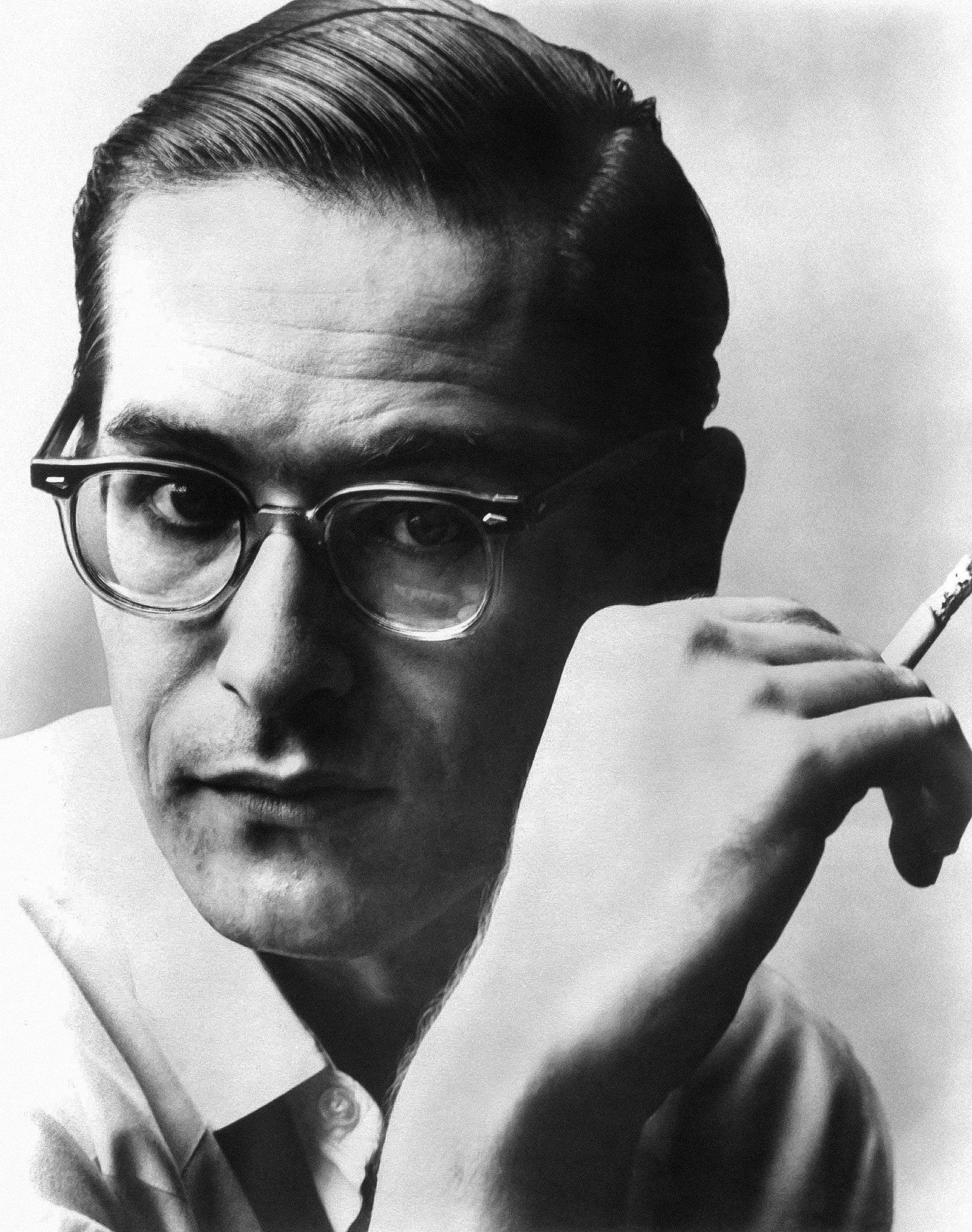
Five-time winner Bill Evans.

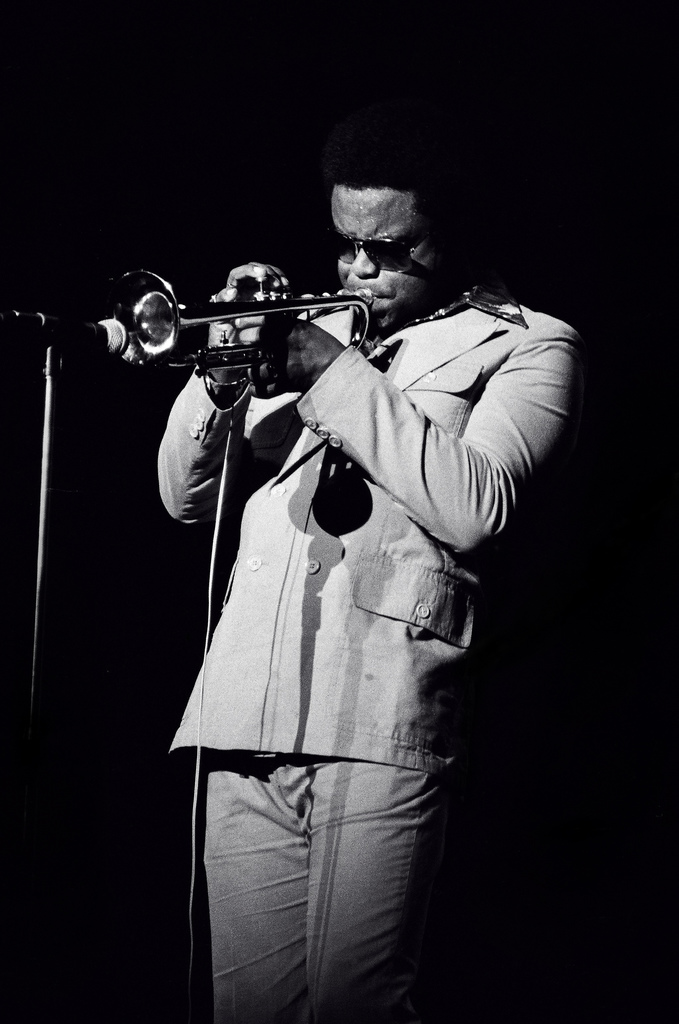
1973 winner Freddie Hubbard.

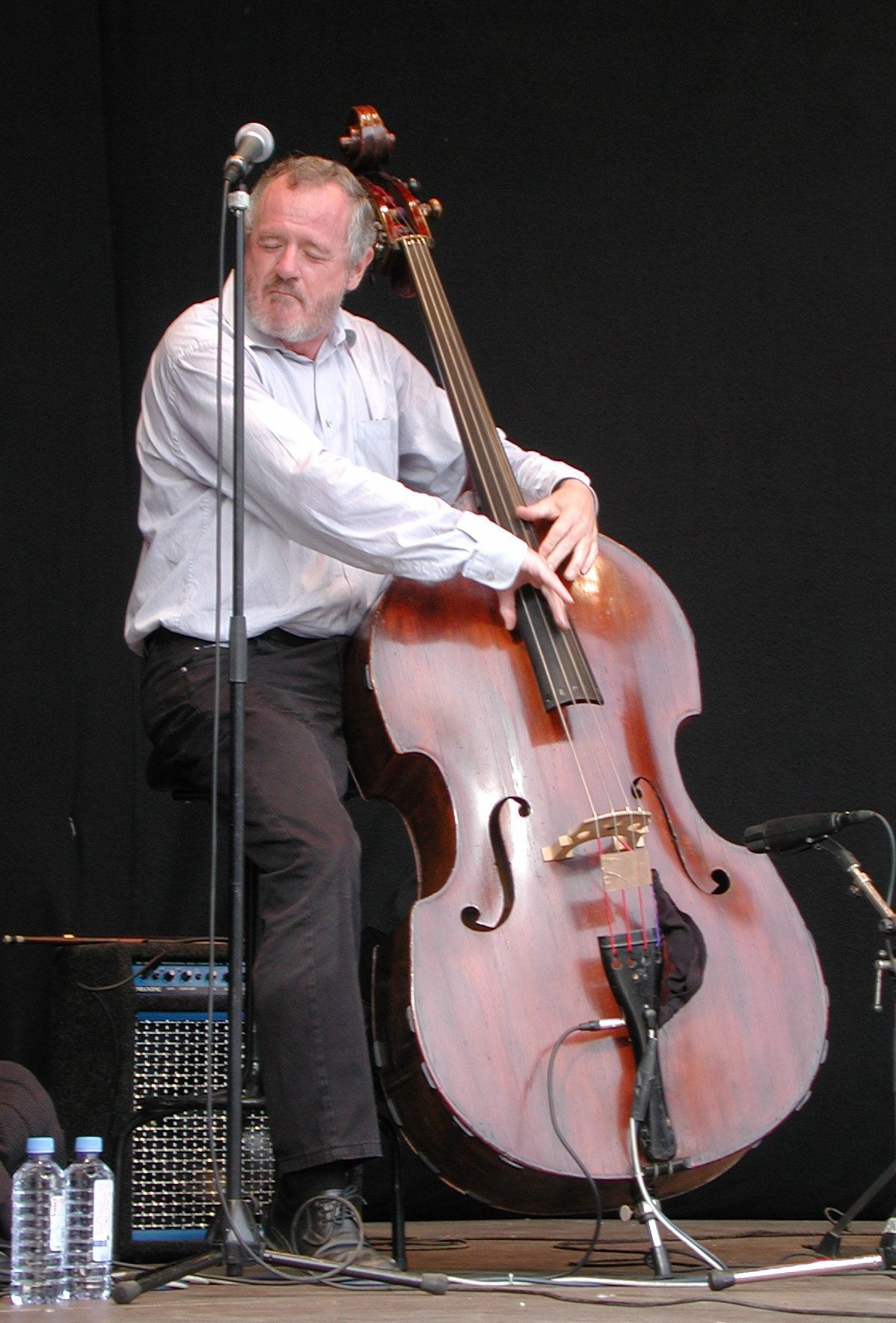
Niels-Henning Ørsted Pedersen won the award in 1975 alongside Oscar Peterson and Joe Pass.

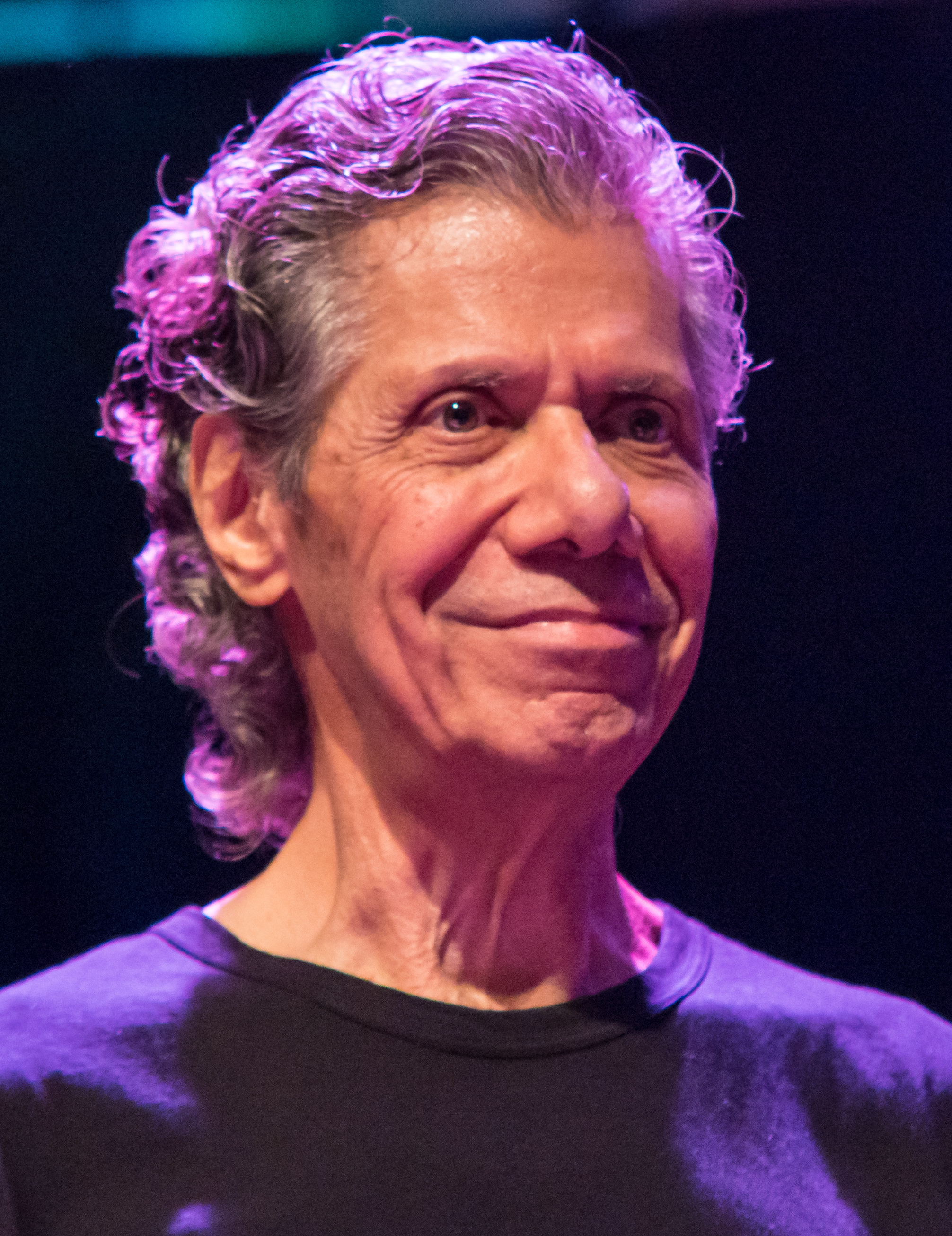
Thirteen-time winner Chick Corea.

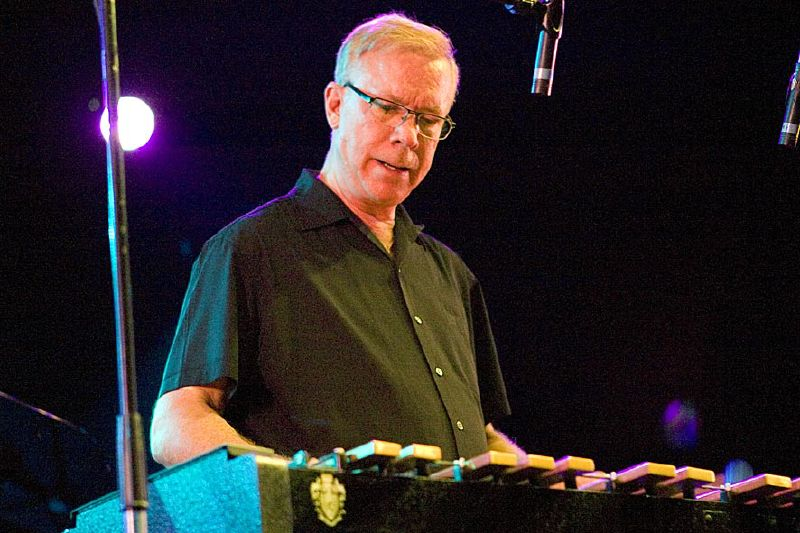
Three-time winner Gary Burton.

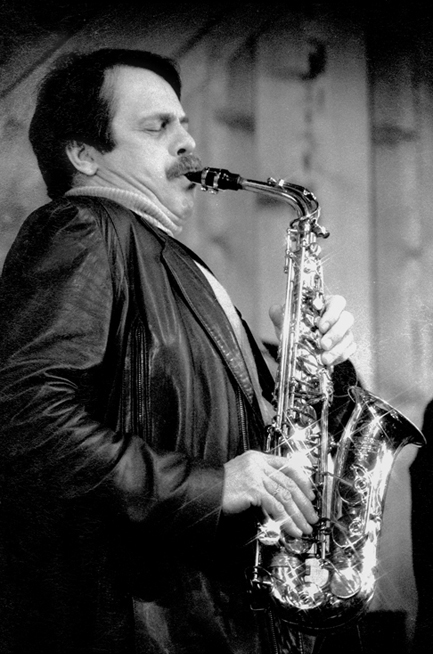
Three-time winner Phil Woods.

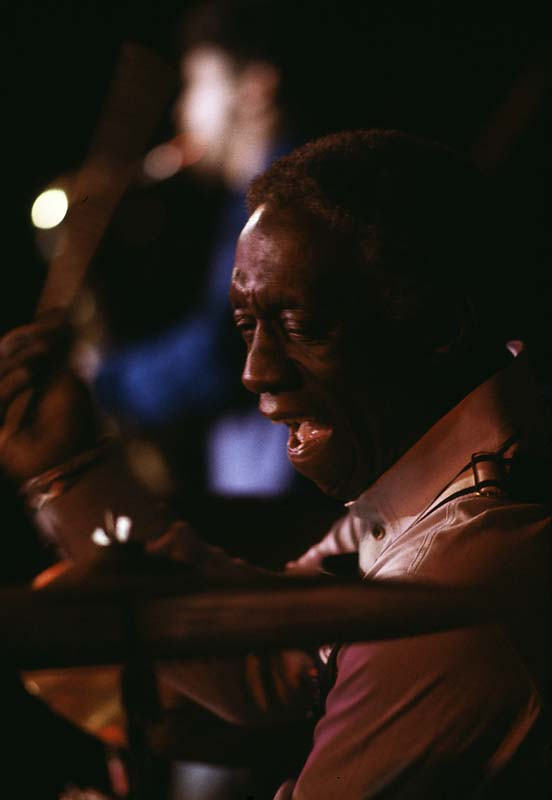
1985 winner Art Blakey.

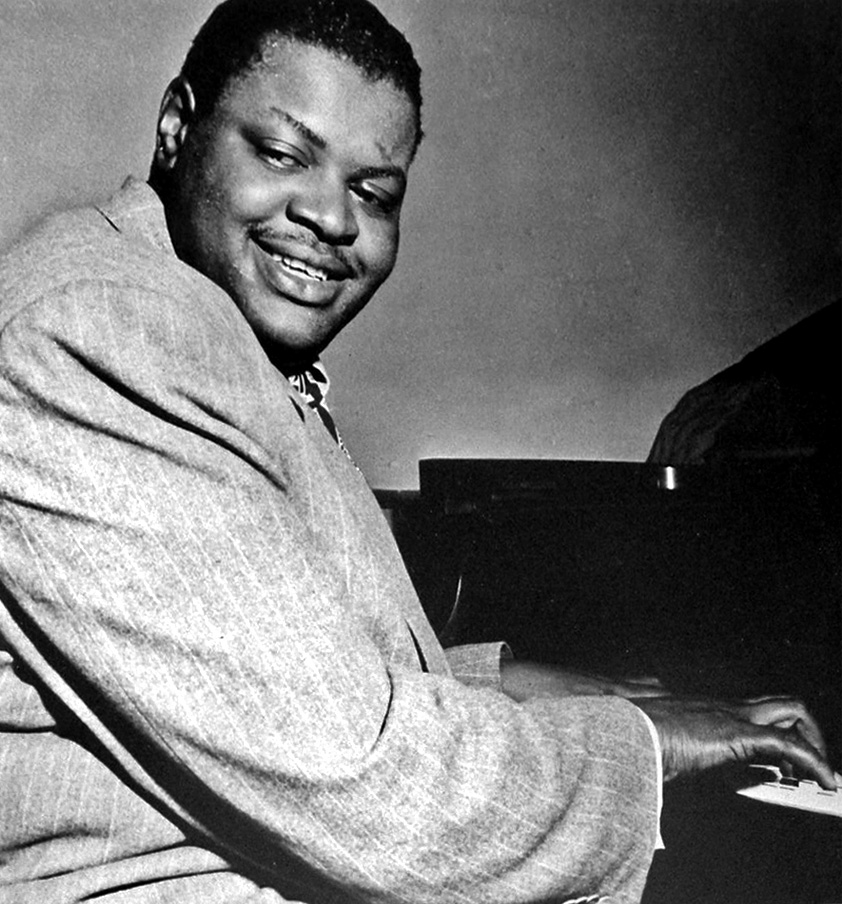
Three-time winner Oscar Peterson.

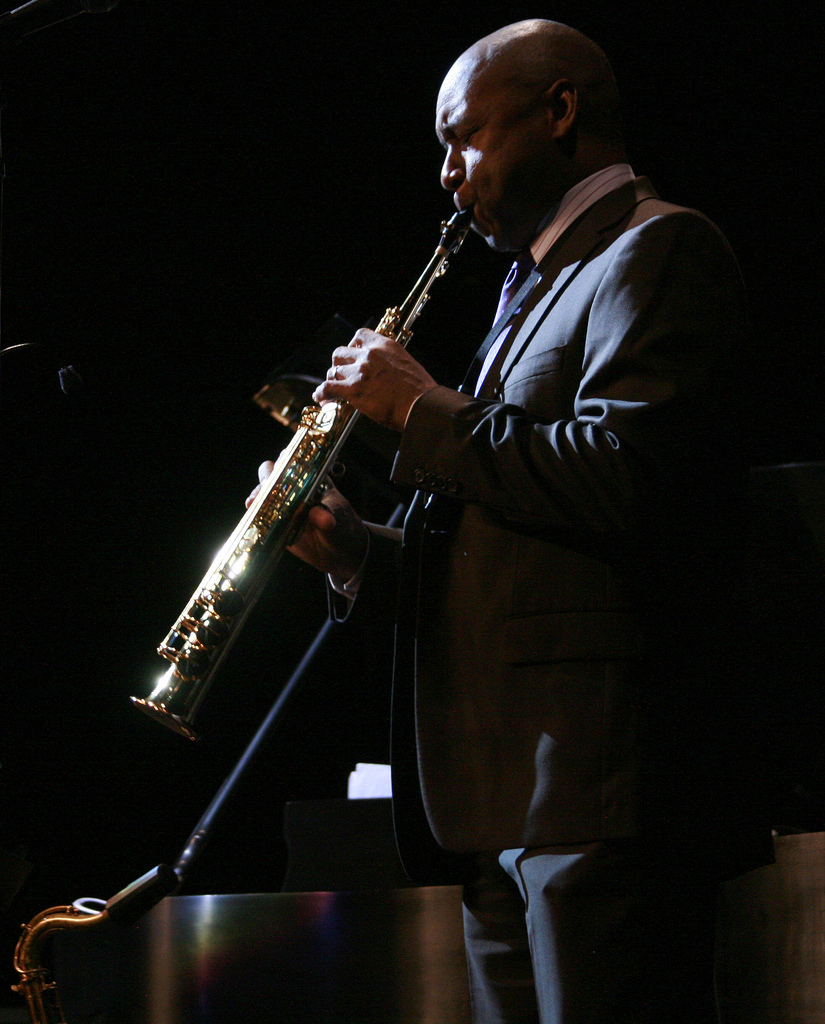
Two-time winner Branford Marsalis.

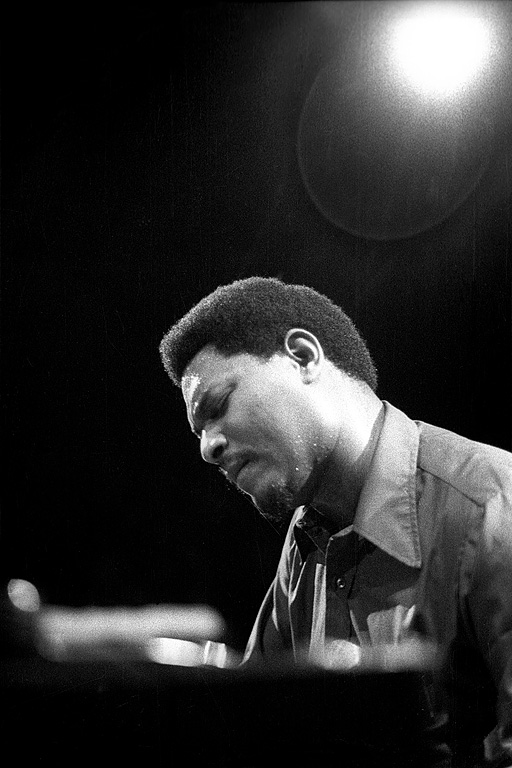
Two-time winner McCoy Tyner.

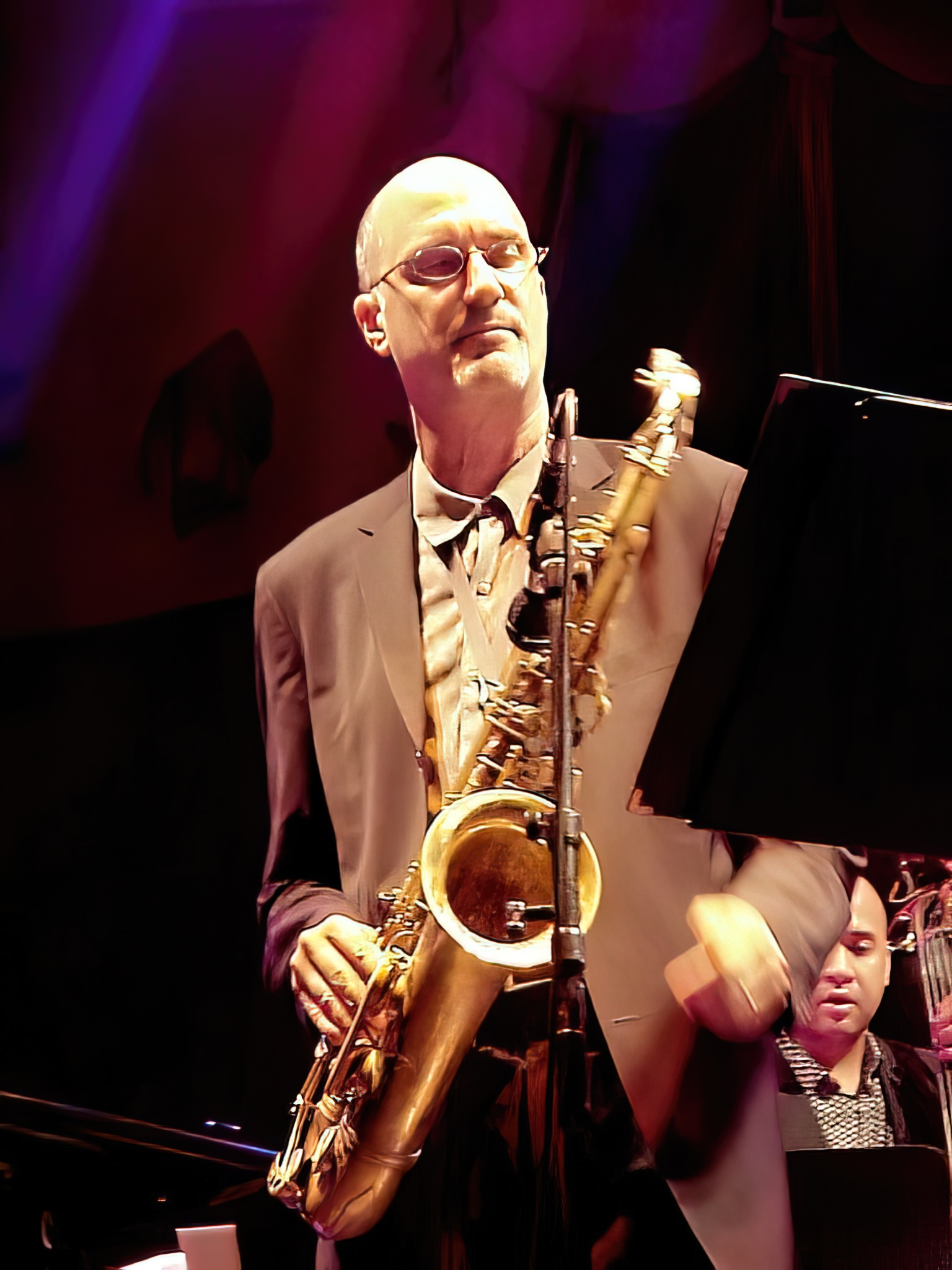
Four-time winner Michael Brecker.

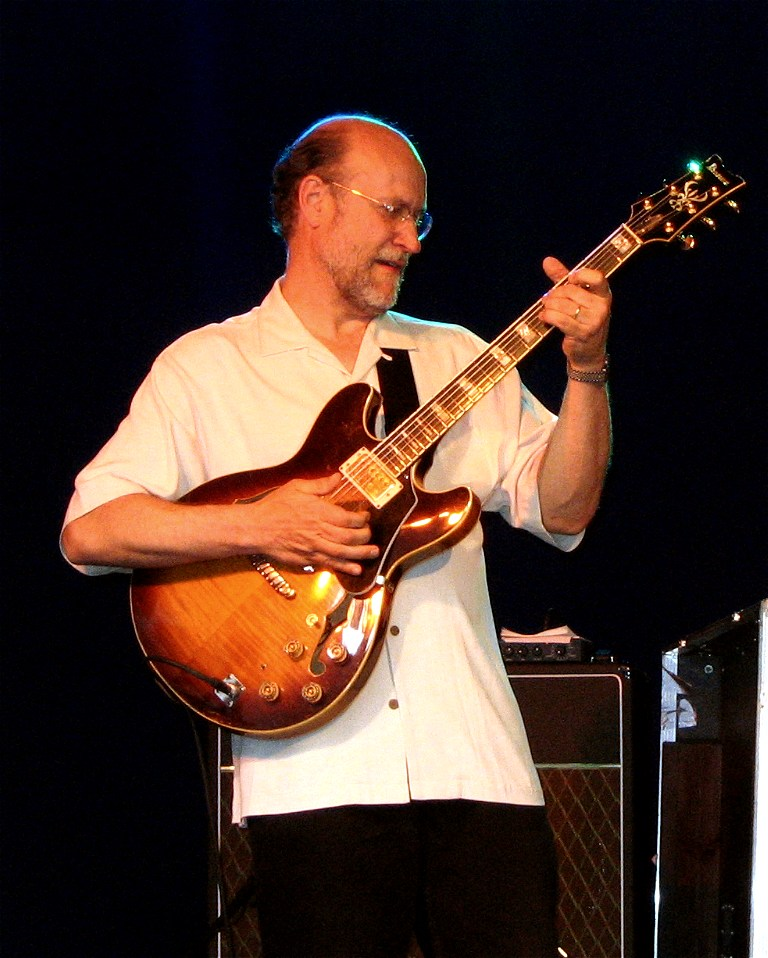
Two-time winner John Scofield.

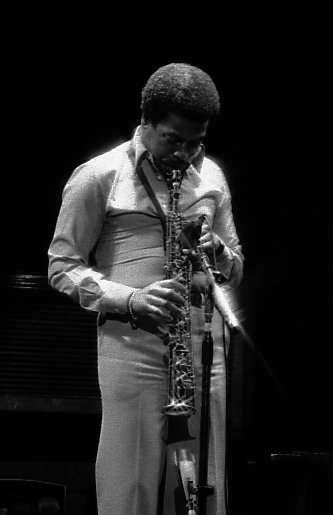
Four-time winner Wayne Shorter.

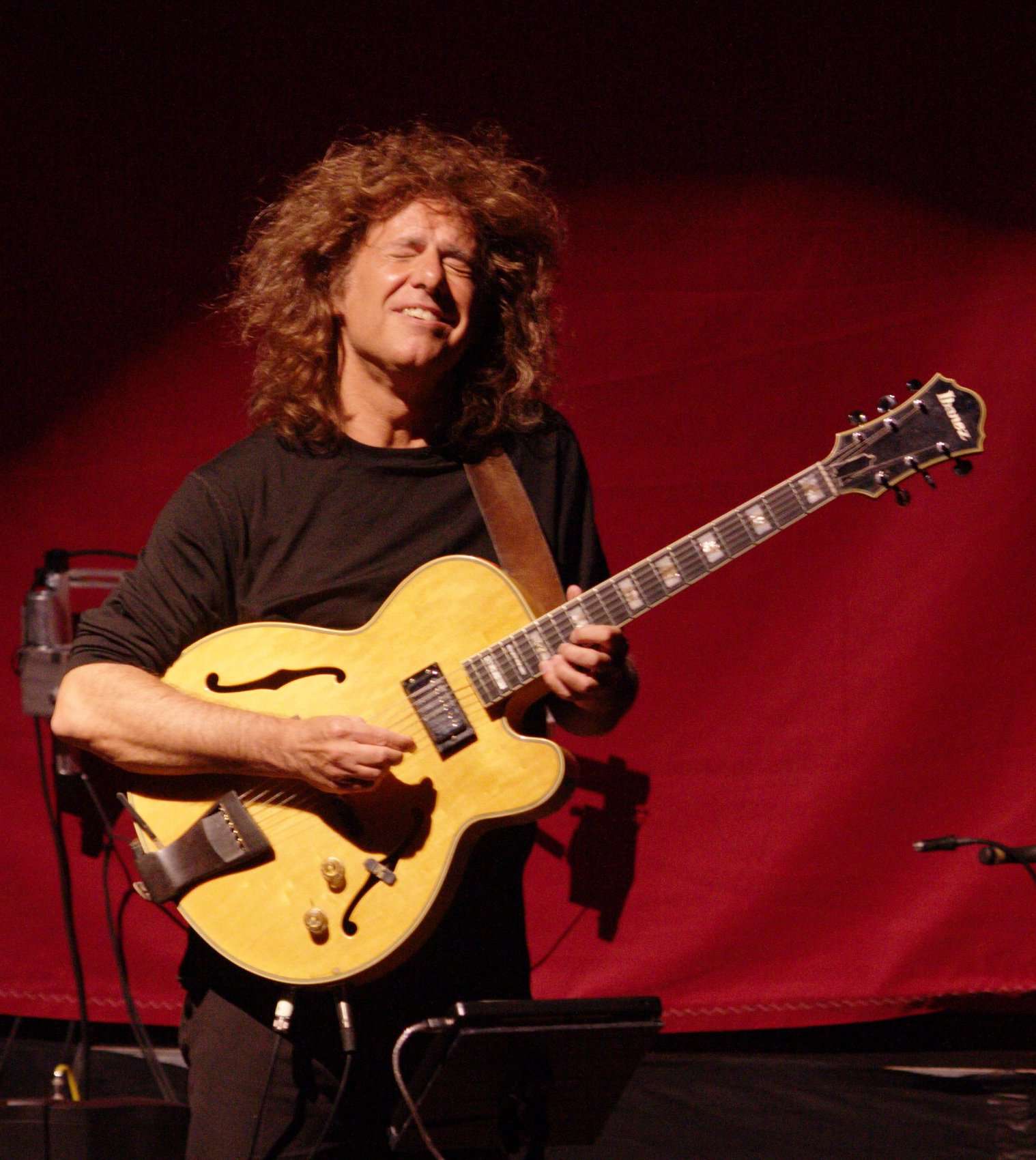
Three-time winner Pat Metheny.

Year^{[I]}	Performing artist(s)	Work	Nominees	Ref.
1959	Count Basie	Basie	Basie Rhythm Section and Dave Lambert Singers – "Sing a Song of Basie"; The Four Freshmen – The Four Freshmen in Person; George Shearing – Burnished Brass; Jonah Jones – "Baubles, Bangles and Beads"	
1960	Jonah Jones	I Dig Chicks	Red Norvo – Red Norvo in Hi-Fi; Henry Mancini – More Music from Peter Gunn; Duke Ellington – Ellington Jazz Party; Shorty Rogers – Chances Are It Swings	
1961	André Previn	West Side Story	George Shearing – White Satin; Dizzy Gillespie and His Octet – The Greatest Trumpet of Them All; Modern Jazz Quartet – Pyramid; Miles Davis – Jazz Track; Art Tatum – Greatest Piano of Them All; Lambert, Hendricks & Ross – The Hottest New Group in Jazz; Duke Ellington & Johnny Hodges – Back to Back: Duke Ellington and Johnny Hodges Play the Blues	
1962	André Previn	André Previn Plays Songs by Harold Arlen	Al Hirt – The Greatest Horn in the World; Modern Jazz Quartet – European Concert; Erroll Garner – Dreamstreet; Bill Evans Trio – Bill Evans at The Village Vanguard	
1963	Stan Getz	Desafinado	Oscar Peterson – West Side Story; Laurindo Almeida – Viva Bossa Nova!; Bill Evans and Jim Hall – Undercurrent; Charles Mingus – Tijuana Moods; George Shearing Quintet – Nat King Cole Sings/George Shearing Plays; Eddie Cano – A Taste of Honey	
1964	Bill Evans	Conversations with Myself	Miles Davis – Seven Steps to Heaven; Peter Nero – Peter Nero in Person; Al Hirt – Our Man in New Orleans; Dave Brubeck Quartet – Dave Brubeck at Carnegie Hall; Thelonious Monk – Criss-Cross; Ray Brown, Andre Previn, Herb Ellis and Shelly Manne – 4 to Go!	
1965	Stan Getz	Getz/Gilberto	Pete Jolly – Sweet September; Andre Previn – My Fair Lady; Clark Terry and Oscar Peterson – Mumbles; Miles Davis – Miles Davis in Europe; The Modern Jazz Quartet with Laurindo Almeida – Collaboration	
1966	Ramsey Lewis	The In Crowd	Bill Evans Trio – Trio '65; Clark Terry and the Bob Brookmeyer Quintet – The Power of Positive Swinging; Cal Tjader – Soul Sauce; Gary McFarland Group – Soft Samba; Paul Desmond and Jim Hall – Glad to Be Unhappy; Paul Horn – Cycle; John Coltrane – A Love Supreme	
1967	Wes Montgomery	Goin' Out of My Head	Woody Herman Orchestra – Woody's Winners; Stan Kenton – Stan Kenton Conducts the Los Angeles Neophonic Orchestra; John Handy Quintet – John Handy Recorded Live at the Monterey Jazz Festival; Bill Evans and Jim Hall – Intermodulation; Duke Ellington – Concert of Sacred Music; Bill Evans Trio – Bill Evans Trio with Symphony Orchestra; Ornette Coleman Trio – At the "Golden Circle"	
1968	Cannonball Adderley	Mercy, Mercy, Mercy! Live at 'The Club'	Stan Getz – Sweet Rain; Miles Davis – Miles Smiles; Bobby Hutcherson – Happenings; Bill Evans – Further Conversations with Myself; Gary Burton Quartet – Duster	
1969	Bill Evans	Bill Evans at the Montreux Jazz Festival	Eddie Harris – The Electrifying Eddie Harris; Herbie Hancock and Miles Davis – Miles in the Sky; Various (Miles Davis, Chick Corea, Dizzy Gillespie, Elvin Jones, Buddy Rich, Etc.) – Jazz for Sunday Afternoon Vol. I; Gary Burton Quartet – Gary Burton Quartet in Concert; Dave Brubeck and Gerry Mulligan – Compadres	
1970	Wes Montgomery	Willow Weep for Me	Bill Evans with Jeremy Steig – What's New; Stephane Grappelli, Stuff Smith, Svend Asmussen, Jean-Luc Ponty – Violin Summit; Oscar Peterson – The Great Oscar Peterson On Prestige; Eubie Blake – The Eighty-Six Years of Eubie Blake; Herbie Mann – Memphis Underground; Miles Davis – In a Silent Way	
1971	Bill Evans	Alone	Milt Jackson Quintet with Ray Brown – That's the Way It Is; Les McCann and Eddie Harris – Swiss Movement; Gary Burton – Good Vibes; Erroll Garner – Feeling is Believing; Herbie Hancock – Fat Albert Rotunda; John Coltrane – Coltrane Legacy	
1972	Bill Evans Trio	The Bill Evans Album	Roy Eldridge – The Nifty Cat; Phil Woods and His European Rhythm Machine – Phil Woods and his European Rhythm Machine at the Frankfurt Jazz Festival; Herbie Hancock – Mwandishi; Miles Davis – Miles Davis at the Fillmore; Mary Lou Williams, Dizzy Gillespie, Bobby Hackett – Giants; Gary Burton and Keith Jarrett – Gary Burton & Keith Jarrett	
1973	Freddie Hubbard	First Light	George Benson – "White Rabbit"; Chuck Mangione Quartet – The Chuck Mangione Quartet; McCoy Tyner – Sahara; Joe Farrell – Outback; Weather Report – I Sing the Body Electric	
1974	Supersax	Supersax Plays Bird	Oregon – Music of Another Present Era; Chick Corea and Return to Forever – Light as a Feather; Cannonball Adderley Quintet – Inside Straight; Jim Hall, Ron Carter – Alone Together	
1975	Joe Pass, Niels-Henning Ørsted Pedersen, Oscar Peterson	The Trio	Bill Evans – The Tokyo Concert; McCoy Tyner – Sama Layuca; Supersax – Salt Peanuts; Freddie Hubbard – High Energy	
1976	Chick Corea & Return to Forever	No Mystery	Supersax – Supersax Plays Bird with Strings; John Coltrane – Giant Steps (First Release of Alternate Take); Dizzy Gillespie Quartet – Dizzy Gillespie's Big 4; Count Basie – Basie Jam	
1977	Chick Corea	The Leprechaun	Paul Desmond Quartet – The Paul Desmond Quartet Live; The Bill Evans Trio – Since We Met; Jaco Pastorius – Jaco Pastorius; Count Basie and Zoot Sims – Basie & Zoot	
1978	Phil Woods	The Phil Woods Six – Live from the Showboat	Mel Lewis – Mel Lewis and Friends; Dexter Gordon – Homecoming: Live at the Village Vanguard; The Tommy Flanagan Trio – Eclypso; John Coltrane – Afro Blue Impressions	
1979	Chick Corea	Friends	Stan Getz and Jimmy Rowles – The Peacocks; Phil Woods Quintet – Song for Sisyphus; Woody Shaw Concert Ensemble – Rosewood; Al Cohn and Jimmy Rowles – Heavy Love	
1980	Chick Corea & Gary Burton	Duet	Zoot Sims – Warm Tenor; Dizzy Gillespie and Count Basie – The Gifted Ones; The Great Jazz Trio – Love for Sale; Arnett Cobb and The Muse All Stars – Live at Sandy's!; Bill Evans and Jean "Toots" Thielemans – Affinity	
1981	Bill Evans	We Will Meet Again	Phil Woods – Phil Woods Quartet - Volume One; The Heath Brothers – Live at The Public Theatre; Nick Brignola – L.A. Bound; Hank Jones – I Remember You; Bobby Shew – Bobby Shew, Outstanding in His Field	
1982	Chick Corea & Gary Burton	Chick Corea & Gary Burton in Concert - Zurich, October 28, 1979	Vic Dickenson Quintet – Vic Dickenson Quintet; Zoot Sims – The Swinger; Al Cohn – Nonpareil; Red Rodney featuring Ira Sullivan – Live at the Village Vanguard	
1983	Phil Woods	"More" Live	Art Blakey and Jazz Messengers – Straight Ahead; The Tommy Flanagan Trio – Giant Steps; Dizzy Gillespie with The Mitchell-Ruff Duo – Dizzy Gillespie - Live with The Mitchell-Ruff Duo; Art Farmer Quartet – A Work of Art	
1984	Phil Woods	At the Vanguard	Philly Joe Jones – To Tadd with Love; Wynton Marsalis – Think of One; Red Rodney and Ira Sullivan – Sprint; Herbie Hancock – Quartet; Art Blakey and The Jazz Messengers – Keystone 3	
1985	Art Blakey	New York Scene	Clare Fischer with Woodwinds – Whose Woods Are These?; Frank Foster and Frank Weiss – Two for the Blues; Phil Woods and Chris Swansen – Piper at The Gates of Dawn; Philly Joe Jones – Look Stop Listen	
1986	Wynton Marsalis	Black Codes (From the Underground)	Chick Corea and Steve Kujala – Voyage; Sting – The Dream of the Blue Turtles (track); Keith Jarrett – Standards, Vol. 2; Herbie Hancock, Freddie Hubbard, Joe Henderson and Others – One Night with Blue Note	
1987	Wynton Marsalis	J Mood	Louis Bellson, Teddy Wilson, Benny Carter, Red Norvo, Remo Palmier, Freddie Green, George Duvivier – Swing Reunion; Jack DeJohnette, Keith Jarrett and Gary Peacock – Standards Live; Scott Hamilton and Gerry Mulligan – Soft Lights and Sweet Music; Art Blakey and The Jazz Messengers – Art Blakey and The Jazz Messengers Live at Sweet Basil	
1988	Wynton Marsalis	Marsalis Standard Time, Vol. I	Michael Brecker – Michael Brecker; Chick Corea, Miroslav Vitous and Roy Haynes – Trio Music Live in Europe; Eddie Daniels – To Bird with Love; Larry Carlton – Last Nite	
1989	Roy Haynes, Cecil McBee, David Murray, Pharoah Sanders, McCoy Tyner	Blues for Coltrane: A Tribute to John Coltrane	Wynton Marsalis Quartet – The Wynton Marsalis Quartet Live at Blues Alley; The Keith Jarrett Trio – Still Live; Branford Marsalis Quartet – Random Abstract; Chick Corea Elektric Band – "Amnesia"	
1990	Chick Corea	Chick Corea Akoustic Band	Branford Marsalis – Trio Jeepy; Yellowjackets – The Spin; Wynton Marsalis Group – The Majesty of the Blues; André Previn, Joe Pass and Ray Brown – After Hours	
1991	Oscar Peterson Trio	The Legendary Oscar Peterson Trio Live at the Blue Note	Wynton Marsalis Group – Standard Time, Vol. 3: The Resolution of Romance; Dizzy Gillespie and Max Roach – Max + Dizzy: Paris 1989; Art Blakey, Dr. John and David "Fathead" Newman – Bluesiana Triangle; Branford Marsalis Quartet with Terence Blanchard – "Again Never"	
1992	Oscar Peterson Trio	Saturday Night at the Blue Note	Dave Grusin – The Gershwin Connection; Lionel Hampton and The Golden Men of Jazz – Lionel Hampton and The Golden Men of Jazz Live at The Blue Note; David Sanborn – Another Hand; Chick Corea Akoustic Band – Alive	
1993	Branford Marsalis	I Heard You Twice the First Time	Joe Henderson – Lush Life; Arturo Sandoval – I Remember Clifford; Charlie Haden Quartet West – Haunted Heart; Eddie Daniels and Gary Burton – Benny Rides Again	
1994	Joe Henderson	So Near, So Far (Musings for Miles)	Lee Ritenour – Wes Bound; Kenny Barron – Sambao; Joshua Redman – Joshua Redman; Fred Hersch Trio – Dancing in the Dark	
1995	Ron Carter, Herbie Hancock, Wallace Roney, Wayne Shorter, Tony Williams	A Tribute to Miles	Joe Lovano – Tenor Legacy; Gonzalo Rubalcaba – Rapsodia; Benny Carter – Elegy in Blue; Charlie Haden Quartet West – Always Say Goodbye	
1996	McCoy Tyner Trio & Michael Brecker	Infinity	Kenny Barron with Roy Haynes and Charlie Haden – Wanton Spirit; Charlie Haden and Hank Jones – Steal Away; Fred Hersch – I Never Told You - Fred Hersch Plays Johnny Mandel; Joe Henderson – Double Rainbow: The Music of Antonio Carlos Jobim	
1997	Michael Brecker	Tales from the Hudson	Horace Silver – The Hardbop Grandpop; Billy Childs – The Child Within; Joe Lovano – Quartets: Live at the Village Vanguard; Charlie Haden Quartet West – Now Is the Hour	
1998	Charlie Haden & Pat Metheny	Beyond the Missouri Sky (Short Stories)	Kenny Garrett – Songbook; Chick Corea and Friends – Remembering Bud Powell; Doc Cheatham and Nicholas Payton – Doc Cheatham and Nicholas Payton; Joe Lovano – Celebrating Sinatra	
1999	Herbie Hancock	Gershwin's World	Keith Jarrett, Gary Peacock and Jack DeJohnette – Tokyo '96; Dave Holland Quintet – Points of View; Charlie Haden and Kenny Barron – Night and the City; Chick Corea and Gary Burton – Native Sense - The New Duets	
2000	Gary Burton, Chick Corea, Roy Haynes, Dave Holland and Pat Metheny	Like Minds	Chick Corea & Origin – Change –; Branford Marsalis Quartet – Requiem; Brad Mehldau – Art of the Trio 4: Back at the Vanguard; Gonzalo Rubalcaba – Inner Voyage	
2001	Branford Marsalis	Contemporary Jazz	Kenny Barron – Spirit Song; Michael Brecker – Time Is of the Essence; Dave Holland Quintet – Prime Directive; Martial Solal & Johnny Griffin – In & Out	
2002	Sonny Rollins	This Is What I Do	Stefon Harris and Jacky Terrasson – Kindred; Roy Haynes with Dave Holland, Roy Hargrove, Dave Kikoski and Kenny Garrett – Birds of a Feather — A Tribute To Charlie Parker; Dave Holland Quintet – Not For Nothin'; Pat Martino – Live at Yoshi's	
2003	Herbie Hancock, Michael Brecker and Roy Hargrove	Directions in Music: Live at Massey Hall	Michel Camilo – Triangulo; Dave Douglas – The Infinite; Wayne Shorter – Footprints Live!; McCoy Tyner – McCoy Tyner Plays John Coltrane: Live at the Village Vanguard	
2004	Wayne Shorter	Alegría	Chick Corea – Rendezvous in New York; Stefon Harris – The Grand Unification Theory; Dave Holland Quintet – Extended Play: Live at Birdland; Pat Martino – Think Tank	
2005	McCoy Tyner with Gary Bartz, Terence Blanchard, Christian McBride and Lewis Nash	Illuminations	Bill Charlap Trio – Somewhere; Roy Haynes – Fountain of Youth; Keith Jarrett, Gary Peacock & Jack DeJohnette – The Out-of-Towners; Branford Marsalis Quartet – Eternal	
2006	Wayne Shorter	Beyond the Sound Barrier	Terence Blanchard – Flow; Billy Childs Ensemble – Lyric; Wynton Marsalis – Live at the House of Tribes; Kenny Wheeler with Dave Holland, Chris Potter & John Taylor – What Now?	
2007	Chick Corea	The Ultimate Adventure	Ornette Coleman – Sound Grammar; Trio Beyond – Saudades; Kenny Garrett – Beyond the Wall; Sonny Rollins – Sonny, Please	
2008	Michael Brecker	Pilgrimage	The Bill Charlap Trio – Live at the Village Vanguard; Joe Lovano and Hank Jones – Kids: Live at Dizzy's Club Coca-Cola; John Patitucci – Line by Line; Joshua Redman – Back East	
2009	Chick Corea & Gary Burton	The New Crystal Silence	Bill Frisell – History, Mystery; Brad Mehldau Trio – Brad Mehldau Trio Live; Pat Metheny featuring Christian McBride & Antonio Sánchez – Day Trip; Alan Pasqua, Dave Carpenter & Peter Erskine – Standards	
2010	Chick Corea & John McLaughlin	Five Peace Band Live	Gary Burton, Pat Metheny, Steve Swallow & Antonio Sánchez – Quartet Live; The Clayton Brothers – Brother To Brother; John Patitucci Trio – Remembrance; Allen Toussaint – The Bright Mississippi	
2011	James Moody	Moody 4B	John Beasley – Positootly!; Clayton Brothers – The New Song and Dance; Vijay Iyer Trio – Historicity; Danilo Pérez – Providencia	
2012	Corea, Clarke & White	Forever	Gerald Clayton – Bond: The Paris Sessions; Fred Hersch – Alone at the Vanguard; Joe Lovano & Us Five – Bird Songs; Sonny Rollins – Road Shows Vol. 2; Yellowjackets – Timeline	
2013	Pat Metheny	Unity Band	Chick Corea, Eddie Gómez & Paul Motian – Further Explorations; Chick Corea & Gary Burton – Hot House; Kenny Garrett – Seeds from the Underground; Ahmad Jamal – Blue Moon	
2014	Terri Lyne Carrington	Money Jungle: Provocative in Blue	The New Gary Burton Quartet – Guided Tour; Gerald Clayton – Life Forum; Kenny Garrett – Pushing the World Away; Christian McBride Trio – Out Here	
2015	Chick Corea	Trilogy	Brian Blade and the Fellowship Band – Landmarks; Fred Hersch Trio – Floating; Bobby Hutcherson, David Sanborn, Joey DeFrancesco featuring Billy Hart – Enjoy the View; Jason Moran – All Rise: A Joyful Elegy for Fats Waller	
2016	John Scofield	Past Present	Joey Alexander – My Favorite Things; Terence Blanchard featuring the E-Collective – Breathless; Robert Glasper and the Robert Glasper Trio – Covered: Recorded Live at Capitol Studios; Jimmy Greene – Beautiful Life	
2017	John Scofield	Country for Old Men	Kenny Barron Trio – Book of Intuition; Peter Erskine – Dr. Um; Fred Hersch Trio – Sunday Night at the Vanguard; Joshua Redman & Brad Mehldau – Nearness	
2018	Billy Childs	Rebirth	Bill Charlap Trio – Uptown, Downtown; Joey DeFrancesco & The People – Project Freedom; Fred Hersch – Open Book; Chris Potter – The Dreamer Is the Dream	
2019	Wayne Shorter Quartet	Emanon	Tia Fuller – Diamond Cut; Fred Hersch Trio – Live in Europe; Brad Mehldau Trio – Seymour Reads the Constitution!; Joshua Redman, Ron Miles, Scott Colley & Brian Blade – Still Dreaming	
2020	Brad Mehldau	Finding Gabriel	Joey DeFrancesco – In the Key of the Universe; Branford Marsalis Quartet – The Secret Between the Shadow and the Soul; Christian McBride – Christian McBride's New Jawn; Joshua Redman Quartet – Come What May	
2021	Chick Corea (posthumous), Christian McBride & Brian Blade	Trilogy 2	Ambrose Akinmusire - On The Tender Spot of Every Calloused Moment; Terri Lyne Carrington & Social Science - Waiting Game; Gerald Clayton - Happening: Live at the Village Vanguard; Redman Mehldau McBride Blade - RoundAgain	
2022	Ron Carter, Jack DeJohnette and Gonzalo Rubalcaba	Skyline	Jon Batiste – Jazz Selections: Music from and Inspired by Soul; Terence Blanchard featuring the E Collective and the Turtle Island Quartet – Absence; Chick Corea, John Patitucci and Dave Weckl – Akoustic Band Live; Pat Metheny – Side-Eye NYC (V1.IV)	
2023	Terri Lyne Carrington, Kris Davis, Linda May Han Oh, Nicholas Payton, and Matthew Stevens	New Standards Vol. 1	Peter Erskine Trio – Live in Italy; Joshua Redman, Brad Mehldau, Christian McBride, and Brian Blade – LongGone; Wayne Shorter, Terri Lyne Carrington, Leo Genovese, and Esperanza Spalding – Live at the Detroit Jazz Festival; Yellowjackets – Parallel Motion	
2024	Billy Childs	The Winds of Change	Kenny Barron – The Source; Lakecia Benjamin – Phoenix; Adam Blackstone – Legacy: The Instrumental Jawn; Pat Metheny – Dream Box	
2025	Chick Corea and Béla Fleck	Remembrance	Ambrose Akinmusire featuring Bill Frisell and Herlin Riley – Owl Song; Kenny Barron featuring Kiyoshi Kitagawa, Johnathan Blake, Immanuel Wilkins & Steve Nelson – Beyond This Place; Lakecia Benjamin – Phoenix Reimagined (Live); Sullivan Fortner – Solo Game	
2026	Sullivan Fortner ft. Peter Washington & Marcus Gilmore	Southern Nights	Chick Corea, Christian McBride & Brian Blade – Trilogy 3 — Live; Branford Marsalis Quartet – Belonging; John Patitucci ft. Chris Potter & Brian Blade – Spirit Fall; Yellowjackets – Fasten Up	
2027	Winner TBA on 7 February 2027		Jon Batiste - Monk Movements; Lakecia Benjamin - We Dream; Chick Corea - Forever Yours: The Farewell Performance (Live); Sullivan Fortner - Leave That In There; Pat Metheny - Side-Eye III+	

== See also ==
- Grammy Award for Best Large Jazz Ensemble Album
- Grammy Award for Best Improvised Jazz Solo
- Grammy Award for Best Jazz Vocal Album
