= Gettin' to It =

Studio album by Christian McBride
- Released: January 1995
- Recorded: August 30–31 & September 1, 1994
- Studios: Clinton Recording Studios, New York City.
- Genre: Jazz
- Length: 55:34
- Label: Verve
- Producers: Richard Seidel, Don Sickler

Christian McBride chronology
Gettin' to It (1995)	Number Two Express (1996)

Gettin' to It is the debut studio album of American jazz bassist Christian McBride. The album was released in 1995 by Verve.

== Background ==
The album was produced by Richard Seidel and Don Sickler, and released by Verve Records in January 1995. Although this was McBride's first solo album, he had previously featured on records as a sidesman for Gary Bartz on the album Shadows, Benny Green on Greens, Roy Hargrove on Public Eye, Joe Henderson on Lush Life: The Music of Billy Strayhorn, Freddie Hubbard on Live at Fat Tuesday's, Joe Lovano on Tenor Legacy, Harold Mabern on Lookin' on the Bright Side, and Joshua Redman on Joshua Redman. Redman and Hargrove appear on Gettin' to It as instrumentalists. The record features 10 tracks and a total running time of 55 minutes and 34 seconds.

== Reception ==
Professional ratings
Review scores
Source	Rating
AllMusic	4/5 stars
Entertainment Weekly	B
The Penguin Guide to Jazz Recordings	3/4 stars
Tom Hull	A−

Howard Reich of Chicago Tribune noted "That Christian McBride is one of the most appealing and accomplished young bass players to come along in years must be obvious to anyone who has heard him accompany Roy Hargrove, Freddie Hubbard and other stars. Now McBride is stepping into the spotlight with his first recording as leader. Though the music isn't particularly adventurous, it celebrates jazz tradition with a technical brilliance, a rhythmic vigor and a sonic warmth that are uniquely McBride's." Jeff Levenson of Billboard commented "Gettin' To It is not a typical bass player's album. McBride is not showcased in a flamboyant manner, nor is he placed front and center, overshadowing his bandmates. His presence and authority, however, are unmistakable, from the radio-friendly funk of the title track to his solo tour de force on "Night Train,' to the uplifting treatment of "Splanky," on which McBride proves himself the descendant of trio mates and spiritual godfathers Milt Hinton, age 84, and Ray Brown, 68". Tony Scherman of Entertainment Weekly added "Christian McBride has a big, fat tone and limitless dexterity, and the music boils (especially a choice piece of funk called ”In a Hurry”), but everything feels a little antiseptic — this isn’t, after all, a working band, just a one-shot convocation of hired guns".

== Track listing ==
No.	Title	Writer(s)	Length
1.	"In a Hurry"	McBride	4:35
2.	"The Shade of the Cedar Tree"	McBride	7:39
3.	"Too Close for Comfort"	Jerry Bock, George David Weiss, Larry Holofcener	5:50
4.	"Sitting on a Cloud"	McBride	5:46
5.	"Splanky"	Neal Hefti	4:15
6.	"Gettin' to It"	McBride	5:30
7.	"Stars Fell on Alabama"	Frank Perkins, Mitchell Parish	5:23
8.	"Black Moon"	McBride	5:18
9.	"King Freddie of Hubbard"	McBride	7:39
10.	"Night Train"	Jimmy Forrest, Lewis Simpkins, Oscar Washington	3:38
Total length:			55:34

== Personnel ==
Band

- Christian McBride – bass
- Roy Hargrove – trumpet, flugelhorn
- Joshua Redman – tenor saxophone
- Steve Turre – trombone
- Cyrus Chestnut – piano
- Lewis Nash – drums
- Ray Brown & Milt Hinton – bass on "Splanky"

Production

- Richard Seidel & Don Sickler – production
- Jim Anderson – recording

== Chart performance ==
Chart (1995)	Peak position
US Jazz Albums (Billboard)	13
