= LongGone =

Studio album with live tracks by Redman, Mehldau, McBride and Blade
- Released: September 9, 2022
- Recorded: 2007, September 10–12, 2019
- Venue: Herbst Theater, San Francisco
- Studio: Sear Sound Studio C, New York City
- Genre: Jazz
- Length: 47:13
- Label: Nonesuch
- Producer: Joshua Redman; James Farber

Joshua Redman chronology
RoundAgain (2020)	LongGone (2022)	Where Are We (2023)

Professional ratings
Aggregate scores
Source	Rating
Metacritic	88/100
Review scores
Source	Rating
All About Jazz	3/5 stars
AllMusic	4.5/5 stars
Financial Times	3/5 stars
The Guardian	4/5 stars
Jazzwise	4/5 stars
Mojo	4/5 stars
Rolling Stone (India)	4/5 stars
Tom Hull	B+

LongGone is an album by Joshua Redman's quartet, consisting of himself on saxophone, Brad Mehldau on piano, Christian McBride on bass, and Brian Blade on drums. This is the quartet's third release after MoodSwing in 1994 and RoundAgain in 2020. The album features six tracks written by Redman: five originals and one ("Rejoice") taken from MoodSwing.

The album was nominated as Best Jazz Instrumental Album at 65th Annual Grammy Awards.

== Recording and release ==
"Rejoice" was recorded in concert in 2007 at the Herbst Theater in San Francisco, as part of the San Francisco Jazz Festival. The other tracks were recorded on September 10–12, 2019, at Sear Sound Studio C, New York City. The album was released by Nonesuch Records.

== Reception ==
At Metacritic, that assigns a normalized rating out of 100 to reviews from mainstream critics, the album received an average score of 88, based on four reviews, which indicates "universal acclaim".

Jeff Tamarkin writing for JazzTimes stated, "Redman's dominance aside, LongGone ultimately isn't about the dexterity of the individual. Like its predecessors, it's a textbook display of what happens when a group of musicians—each a leader in his own right—understand and trust one another enough to let the music go where it must." John Fordham of The Guardian commented, "The quartet's mid-90s rapport was enthralling, but burgeoning solo careers separated them until 2020's RoundAgain reunion showed that their individual experiences since had only sharpened their intuition as a foursome. Now 2022's LongGone takes the story forward." Matt Collar of AllMusic added, "Most of LongGone feels deeply organic, with Redman and his bandmates feeding off each other and working to build something cohesive and bigger than their individual contributions."

=== Accolades ===
Publications' year-end list appearances for The 7th Hand
Critic/Publication	List	Rank	Ref.
JazzTimes	JazzTimes Top 40 Albums of 2022	6	

== Track listing ==
All tracks are written by Joshua Redman.

No.	Title	Length
1.	"Long Gone"	7:21
2.	"Disco Ears"	6:21
3.	"Statuesque"	8:18
4.	"Kite Song"	6:00
5.	"Ship to Shore"	6:31
6.	"Rejoice"	12:42
Total length:		47:13

== Personnel ==
Band

- Joshua Redman – tenor saxophone, soprano saxophone
- Brad Mehldau – piano
- Christian McBride – bass
- Brian Blade – drums

Production

- Greg Calbi – mastering
- James Farber – associate producer, engineer, mixing
- Brian Montgomery – engineer
- Owen Mulholland – assistant engineer
- Steven Sacco – assistant engineer

== Charts ==
Chart performance for LongGone
Chart (2022)	Peak position
Swiss Albums (Schweizer Hitparade)	68
US Top Jazz Albums (Billboard)	11
