= Come What May =

Come What May may refer to:

== Film ==
- Come What May (film), a 2015 French historical drama

== Music ==
- Come What May (album), a 2019 album by Joshua Redman
- Come What(ever) May, a 2006 album by Stone Sour
- "Come What May" (1952 song), a song popularized by Patti Page
- "Come What May", a song by Patti LaBelle from the 1979 album It's Alright with Me
- "Come What May" (2001 song), a song popularized by Ewan McGregor and Nicole Kidman, from the movie Moulin Rouge!
- "Come What May", a song by Air Supply from the 1982 album Now and Forever
- "Come What May", a duet song by Lani Hall and Herb Alpert
- "Come What May", an English language version of "Après toi", a 1972 song by Vicky Leandros
- Come What May (band), an American rock band
