= Sun on Sand =

Studio album by Joshua Redman and Brooklyn Rider
- Released: 4 October 2019
- Studio: Sear Sound (New York City); Power Station (New York City)
- Genre: Jazz
- Length: 40:19
- Label: Nonesuch
- Producer: Patrick Zimmerli

Joshua Redman and Brooklyn Rider chronology
Come What May (2019)	Sun on Sand (2019)	RoundAgain (2020)

Professional ratings
Review scores
Source	Rating
AllMusic	4.5/5 stars
Financial Times	4/5 stars
Jazz Journal	4/5 stars
Jazzwise	3/5 stars
PopMatters	6/10
The Times	4/5 stars
Tom Hull	B+

Sun on Sand is a studio album by jazz saxophonist Joshua Redman's trio and string quartet Brooklyn Rider. This is a concept album, interpreting eight compositions taken from a suite written by Patrick Zimmerli. The album was released on 4 October 2019 by Nonesuch Records.

== Background ==
On the album, Joshua Redman plays alongside the string quartet with his trio of Scott Colley on double bass and Satoshi Takeishi on drums. Brooklyn Rider quartet includes violinists Johnny Gandelsman, Colin Jacobsen, Nicholas Cords, and cellist Eric Jacobsen. The album features eight tracks taken form Zimmerli's suite "Aspects of Darkness and Light" that tries to address visual effects through sound. His work combines elements of jazz, classical and contemporary music. The full suite had its premiere at London’s Wigmore Hall on 24 April 2014.

Zimmerli had already worked with Redman on 2013 album Walking Shadows.

== Reception ==
Simon Adams of Jazz Journal stated, "Zimmerli’s spritely, evocative music easily bridges the gap between classical music and contemporary jazz, his strong, driving themes and often-ebullient arrangements enthusiastically delivered by the Brooklyn Riders string quartet. Together they provide more than enough impetus to kick-start Redman’s jazz trio." Mike Hobart of Financial Times commented, "The evocative string arrangements, though somewhat literal, pull the various influences into coherence and are easy on the ear. But it is Redman’s energy, clarity of thought and complex tonal palette combining with the ethnic resonance of Takeishi’s drumming that give the album its original stamp." Matt Collar of AllMusic added, ' Redman has the facility and sound to carry the music, but Brooklyn Rider offer a deeply textured counterpoint, while Zimmerli's expansive voice remains ever present." Kevin Le Gendre of Jazzwise commented, " Redman plays with the flourish one would expect and, above all, his rhythmic input is impressive. But the endeavour has good moments rather than the great moments that makes the most of the abundance of talent gathered in the room."

== Track listing ==
All tracks are written by Patrick Zimmerli.

No.	Title	Length
1.	"Flash"	4:45
2.	"Between Dog and Wolf"	6:43
3.	"Sun on Sand"	6:01
4.	"Dark White"	3.15
5.	"Soft Focus"	5.22
6.	"Through Mist"	6.30
7.	"Starbursts and Haloes"	5.27
8.	"Between Dog and Wolf (Reprise)"	2:20
Total length:		40:19

== Personnel ==
- Joshua Redman – tenor sax
- Scott Colley – bass
- Satoshi Takeishi – drums
- Patrick Zimmerli – arranger, composer, producer
- Brooklyn Rider – strings
