= Still Dreaming (Joshua Redman album) =

Studio album by Joshua Redman, Ron Miles, Scott Colley and Brian Blade
- Released: 25 May 2018
- Recorded: 2–3 April 2017
- Studio: Sear Sound, New York City
- Genre: Jazz
- Length: 39:59
- Label: Nonesuch
- Producer: Joshua Redman

Joshua Redman chronology
Nearness (2016)	Still Dreaming (2018)	Come What May (2019)

Professional ratings
Review scores
Source	Rating
All About Jazz	4.5/5 stars
AllMusic	4/5 stars
The Arts Desk	3/5 stars
Financial Times	4/5 stars
The Guardian	4/5 stars
Jazzwise	4/5 stars
Le Devoir	4/5 stars
The Times	4/5 stars
Tom Hull	B+

Still Dreaming is a studio album by American jazz musician Joshua Redman. The album was recorded with Ron Miles on cornet, Scott Colley on bass, and Brian Blade on drums, and released on 25 May 2018 via Nonesuch label. The album is inspired by Joshua Redman's father Dewey Redman's 1976–1987 band, Old and New Dreams. The record consists of eight compositions, six of which are originals written by band members.

== Reception ==
Rob Adams of The Herald stated "The approach is free-spirited but with each player bringing logic, shape, hunger and direction to a style drawing on folk, blues and gospel influences". Geanine Reid of All About Jazz wrote "Redman's latest exploration is a delight. One of the most accomplished and versatile players on the saxophone scene, his attention to melody and exquisite soloing abilities through salient motivic saturation is breathtaking".

John Fordham of The Guardian mentioned "This is a supergroup at work, but – as with Coleman’s own bands and Old and New Dreams themselves – they never sound as if they’re trying to make an issue out of that". Matt Collar of AllMusic added "On his buoyant 2018 album Still Dreaming, Joshua Redman evokes the spirit of his late father, saxophonist Dewey Redman (who died in 2006), and the elder Redman's adventurous work with longtime friend and bandleader Ornette Coleman".

Walter Tunis of Lexington Herald-Leader stated "It all makes for a jazz adventure that begs for repeated listening. The more you tune in, the more you hear the present day curators of a sublime jazz legacy forging its music into something unmistakably new".

Rolling Stone included the release in its 20 Best Jazz Albums of 2018 list, ranking it #20.

== Track listing ==
No.	Title	Writer(s)	Length
1.	"New Year"	Scott Colley	6:37
2.	"Unanimity"	Redman	5:09
3.	"Haze and Aspirations"	Scott Colley	5:57
4.	"It's Not the Same"	Redman	2:46
5.	"Blues for Charlie"	Redman	6:50
6.	"Playing"	Charlie Haden	3:17
7.	"Comme Il Faut"	Ornette Coleman	3:27
8.	"The Rest"	Redman	5:56
Total length:			39:59

== Personnel ==
Musicians

- Joshua Redman – liner notes, producer, sax (tenor)
- Brian Blade – drums
- Scott Colley – bass
- Ron Miles – cornet

Production

- Robert Hurwitz – executive producer
- James Farber– associate producer, engineer
- Greg Calbi – engineer (mastering)
- Owen Mulholland – assistant engineer
- John Gall – design
- Hans Jörgen Johansen – cover photo
- Jon Brown – band photo
