= RoundAgain =

2020 studio album by Joshua Redman quartet

Studio album by Redman, Mehldau, McBride and Blade
- Released: July 10, 2020
- Recorded: September 10–12, 2019
- Studio: Sear Sound Studio C, New York City
- Genre: Jazz
- Length: 44:38
- Label: Nonesuch
- Producer: Joshua Redman

Joshua Redman chronology
Sun on Sand (2019)	RoundAgain (2020)	LongGone (2022)

Professional ratings
Aggregate scores
Source	Rating
Metacritic	86/100
Review scores
Source	Rating
All About Jazz	5/5 stars
AllMusic	4.5/5 stars
Financial Times	4/5 stars
Jazz Forum	5/5 stars
Jazz Journal	4.5/5 stars
Jazzwise	3/5 stars
Le Devoir	4/5 stars
PopMatters	7/10
The Times	4/5 stars
Tom Hull	B+

RoundAgain is a studio album by Joshua Redman's quartet, consisting of himself on saxophone, Brad Mehldau on piano, Christian McBride on bass, and Brian Blade on drums. The album was released on July 10, 2020 by Nonesuch Records label.

== Background ==
This release is this quartet's first recording since 1994’s MoodSwing. The album features seven new compositions: three by Redman, two by Mehldau, and one each by McBride and Blade. The album was recorded at Sear Sound Studio C, New York City, on September 10–12, 2019. The album was completed just before the pandemic lockdown.JAZZIZ Magazine included the album in its list of "10 Albums You Need to Know: July 2020".

== Reception ==
At Metacritic, that assigns a normalized rating out of 100 to reviews from mainstream critics, the album received an average score of 86, based on four reviews, which indicates "universal acclaim".

Giovanni Russonello of The New York Times wrote, "If “RoundAgain” has anything notably in common with “MoodSwing,” it is the feeling of musicians with a scary level of talent playing into the moment, with full faith that they belong within a lineage. The blend of outside influences into a consensual jazz language, the polyrhythmic play, the scholarly bravado: All those things felt fresh for these musicians in the 1990s, even if they usually don’t for young musicians right now. There’s something undeniable — consoling, even — about hearing them remain true to it today." Phillip Booth in his review for JazzTimes stated, "RoundAgain features a fresh batch of tunes by these acclaimed artists, bolstered by each player’s gifts as a top-shelf instrumentalist, powered by their steadfast ability to sync up, and informed by their collective experience in a wide variety of settings."

Mike Flynn of Jazzwise commented, "Once considered jazz’s 1990s brat pack, the Joshua Redman Quartet’s members are now edging toward elder-statesmen status and all rank among today’s top-billed artists." Matt Collar writing for AllMusic stated, " In some ways, RoundAgain feels like the perfect follow-up to MoodSwing, an album that could have arrived in the late '90s. Yet, it is hard to imagine Redman and his quartet summoning the same warmth and relaxed intensity that they do here without the decades of experience and deep familiarity they've cultivated with each other over the years." Robert Middleton of All About Jazz observed, "This is an album delving deeply into many themes and feelings reflecting life today in our crazy, troubled, dark, and yet somehow extraordinary times. It is alive, sublime, deep and exquisite in its tone and interplay. Four masters deliver a truly satisfying album."

== Track listing ==
No.	Title	Writer(s)	Length
1.	"Undertow"	Redman	7:22
2.	"Moe Honk"	Mehldau	7:11
3.	"Silly Little Love Song"	Redman	7:01
4.	"Right Back Round Again"	Redman	6:00
5.	"Floppy Diss"	McBride	5:22
6.	"Father"	Mehldau	6:37
7.	"Your Part to Play"	Blade	5:04
Total length:			44:38

== Personnel ==
Musicians

- Joshua Redman – tenor saxophone, soprano saxophone
- Brad Mehldau – piano
- Christian McBride – bass
- Brian Blade – drums

Production

- Joshua Redman – producer, liner notes
- James Farber – associate producer, engineer
- Greg Calbi – engineer (mastering)
- JN-H – engineer (lacquer cutting)
- James Farber – engineer (mixing)
- Brian Montgomery – engineer (additional engineering)
- Owen Mulholland – engineer (assistant engineer)
- GuessWorks, Inc. (Andre Guess, Cheryl Guess) – management
- International Music Network – management
- Middle Way Music – management
- Wilkins Management, Inc. – management
- John Gall – design
- Michael Wilson – photography

== Charts ==
Chart performance for RoundAgain
Chart (2020)	Peak position
Belgian Albums (Ultratop Flanders)	56
Belgian Albums (Ultratop Wallonia)	143
German Albums (Offizielle Top 100)	43
Hungarian Albums (MAHASZ)	19
Swiss Albums (Schweizer Hitparade)	8
US Top Jazz Albums (Billboard)	7
