= Come What May (album) =

Studio album by Joshua Redman Quartet
- Released: March 29, 2019
- Recorded: May 8–9, 2018
- Studio: Sear Sound, New York City
- Genre: Jazz
- Length: 43:08
- Label: Nonesuch
- Producer: Joshua Redman

Joshua Redman Quartet chronology
Still Dreaming (2018)	Come What May (2019)	Sun on Sand (2019)

Professional ratings
Review scores
Source	Rating
AllMusic	4/5 stars
Financial Times	4/5 stars
Jazz Journal	3/5 stars
Jazzwise	3/5 stars
Le Devoir	4/5 stars
PopMatters	9/10
The Times	4/5 stars
Tom Hull	B+

Come What May is a studio album by an American jazz quartet led by Joshua Redman. The album was recorded as a quartet and released on March 29, 2019 by Nonesuch Records.

Through the 62nd Annual GRAMMY Awards in 2019, the nomination for Best Jazz Instrumental Album “Come What May” was given to the Joshua Redman Quartet.

== Background ==
Come What May consists of seven original tracks written by Redman. For this group of musicians the album is the first recording in nearly two decades. His longtime friends and colleagues invited for Come What May are pianist Aaron Goldberg, bassist Reuben Rogers, and drummer Gregory Hutchinson. The quartet's previous releases include Beyond (2000), Passage of Time (2001), and — as a pianoless trio without Goldberg — Trios Live (2014).

== Reception ==
Matt Collar of AllMusic commented " Come What May feels looser, more off the cuff, like a relaxed meeting between old friends... With his sax cradled in his band's empathetic embrace, Redman evokes the feeling of letting go and sinking into a soulful, late-afternoon reverie". Mike Hobart of Financial Times stated "Redman has been touring with Aaron Goldberg, Reuben Rogers and Gregory Hutchinson on piano, bass and drums for over 20 years though, surprisingly, this is their first joint release since 2001’s Passage of Time. Now, the improvisations are more closely argued, narratives unfold at speed and swing rhythms have all but disappeared. And the band have developed a mutual empathy and trust that make the ensemble playing relaxed and free". Steve Davis of The Times added "This is the Joshua Redman Quartet’s first [album] in nearly two decades. We can’t complain. The American saxophonist has been a prolific recording artist, but nothing beats the cool confidence of a band who have spent years on the road. It also helps that the seven Redman tunes here are so good." Matthew Kassel of JazzTimes noted "Joshua Redman’s excellent new album marks a homecoming of sorts... If anything, the quartet now sounds wiser and more self-assured. Featured here are seven original compositions by Redman, a straight-ahead collection of runic melodies ranging in style from jam-like funk to medium swing to soulful balladry."

== Track listing ==
All tracks are written by Joshua Redman.

No.	Title	Length
1.	"Circle of Life"	6:55
2.	"I'll Go Mine"	7:14
3.	"Come What May"	6:45
4.	"How We Do"	3:31
5.	"DGAF"	4:47
6.	"Stagger Bear"	6:02
7.	"Vast"	7:48
Total length:		43:08

== Personnel ==
Musicians

- Joshua Redman – tenor saxophone
- Reuben Rogers – bass
- Gregory Hutchinson – drums
- Aaron Goldberg – piano

Production

- Joshua Redman – producer
- James Farber – associate producer, engineer
- Greg Calbi – engineer (mastering)
- Joe Nino-Hernes – engineer (lacquer cutting)
- Brian Montgomery – engineer (additional engineering)
- Owen Mulholland – assistant engineer
- John Gall – design
- David Fokos – photography
