= Choices (Dewey Redman album) =

Studio album by Dewey Redman featuring Joshua Redman
- Released: 1992
- Recorded: July 29 & 30, 1992
- Genre: Jazz
- Length: 43:45
- Label: Enja
- Producer: Horst Weber

Dewey Redman chronology
Living on the Edge (1989)	Choices (1992)	African Venus (1994)

Joshua Redman chronology
Choices (1992)	Joshua Redman (1993)

Choices is an album by American jazz saxophonist Dewey Redman featuring performances recorded in 1992 for the Enja label. The album features the recording debut of Redman's son Joshua Redman.

== Reception ==
The Allmusic review by Thom Jurek awarded the album 4 stars stating "Redman himself is in fine form, playing with all of the deep, steamy lyricism he showcased so brilliantly with Ornette Coleman and in Old and New Dreams, but there is something else too, as evidenced by the track selection, and that is a new reverence for the tradition. Redman was always a melodic player, even in his most fiery avant encounters, but his love for jazz tradition, particularly its formalist considerations, was never really apparent until now".

Professional ratings
Review scores
Source	Rating
Allmusic	4/5 stars

== Track listing ==
All compositions by Dewey Redman except as indicated

1. "Le Clit" - 9:09
2. "Everything Happens to Me" (Tom Adair, Matt Dennis) - 10:27
3. "O'Besso" - 14:09
4. "Imagination" (Johnny Burke, Jimmy Van Heusen) - 8:15
5. "For Mo" - 13:25
  - Recorded at Tom Tedesco Studio in New Jersey on July 29 & 30, 1992

== Personnel ==
- Dewey Redman - tenor saxophone, alto saxophone, musette
- Joshua Redman - tenor saxophone
- Cameron Brown - bass
- Leon Parker - drums
