= Wish (Joshua Redman album) =

Studio album by Joshua Redman
- Released: 21 September 1993
- Studio: Power Station, New York City (tracks 1–8); Village Vanguard, New York City (tracks 9–10)
- Genre: Jazz
- Length: 1:01:35
- Label: Warner Bros.
- Producer: Matt Pierson

Joshua Redman chronology
| Joshua Redman (1993) | Wish (1993) | African Venus (1994) |

Professional ratings
Review scores
| Source | Rating |
|---|---|
| AllMusic | 4.5/5 stars |
| The Encyclopedia of Popular Music | 4/5 stars |
| Tom Hull | A− |
| The Penguin Guide to Jazz Recordings | 4/4 stars |
| The Rolling Stone Jazz & Blues Album Guide | 3.5/5 stars |

Wish is the second studio album by jazz saxophonist Joshua Redman; it was released in 1993 by Warner Bros. Records.

== Background ==
Joshua Redman said that "one of the reasons I wanted to work with these guys — aside from the obvious fact that they're masters — is because they're master storytellers." He said he was pleased with it because "it has a definite collective identity, a real organic unity."

== Reception ==
The AllMusic review by Alex Henderson notes that although the album could have easily been avant-garde (due to Charlie Haden and Billy Higgins having been part of Ornette Coleman's quartet), it is actually a "mostly inside post-bop date". He also praises Redman's "ability to provide jazz interpretations of rock and R&B songs", saying that "in Redman's hands, Stevie Wonder's "Make Sure You're Sure" becomes a haunting jazz-noir statement, while Eric Clapton's ballad "Tears in Heaven" is changed from moving pop/rock to moving pop-jazz", noting that the latter could be called "smooth jazz with substance."

It peaked at number 1 on the Billboard Top Jazz Albums chart.

== Track listing ==
| No. | Title | Writer(s) | Length |
|---|---|---|---|
| 1. | "Turnaround" | Ornette Coleman | 6:24 |
| 2. | "Soul Dance" | Joshua Redman | 6:33 |
| 3. | "Make Sure You're Sure" | Stevie Wonder | 5:26 |
| 4. | "The Deserving Many" | Joshua Redman | 5:40 |
| 5. | "We Had a Sister" | Pat Metheny | 5:47 |
| 6. | "Moose the Mooche" | Charlie Parker | 3:32 |
| 7. | "Tears in Heaven" | Eric Clapton | 3:24 |
| 8. | "Whittlin'" | Pat Metheny | 5:23 |
| 9. | "Wish" (live) | Joshua Redman | 7:25 |
| 10. | "Blues for Pat" (live) | Charlie Haden | 12:07 |
| Total length: | | | 1:01:35 |

== Personnel ==
- Joshua Redman – tenor saxophone
- Pat Metheny – guitar
- Charlie Haden – double bass
- Billy Higgins – drums
