= Spirit of the Moment – Live at the Village Vanguard =

Live album by Joshua Redman Quartet
- Released: 1995
- Recorded: March 21–26, 1995
- Studio: Village Vanguard, New York City
- Genre: Jazz
- Length: 2:27:48
- Label: Warner Bros.
- Producer: Matt Pierson

Joshua Redman chronology
MoodSwing (1994)	Spirit of the Moment – Live at the Village Vanguard (1995)	Blues for Pat: Live In San Francisco (1995)

Spirit of the Moment – Live at the Village Vanguard is a 1995 live album by jazz saxophonist Joshua Redman, released by Warner Bros. Records (9362-45923-2).

Professional ratings
Review scores
Source	Rating
AllMusic	4.5/5 stars
The Buffalo News	4/4 stars
The Encyclopedia of Popular Music	4/5 stars
Tom Hull	B+
The Penguin Guide to Jazz Recordings	3/4 stars
The Rolling Stone Jazz & Blues Album Guide	3/5 stars

== Reception ==
The AllMusic reviewer Scott Yanow awarded the album 4.5 stars. He recommends the album and points out that we get a definitive look at how the tenor saxophonist Joshua Redman sounded in the mid 1990s by listening to it. Redman is joined by Peter Martin (piano), Christopher James Thomas (bass), and Brian Blade (drums), and they are showing off both a wide range and lyricism stretching from Gene Ammons (saluted on "Jig-a-Jug") to late John Coltrane. Jeff Simon of The Buffalo News commented, "Redman is still a wonderful musician, even more grounded in swing-era basics than James Carter (listen to his balladry on "Neverend"). So, too, is he unpredictable, if not nearly as brilliant, driven and limitlessly surprising as Carter."

== Track listing ==
All tracks are written by Joshua Redman except where noted.

No.	Title	Writer(s)	Length
1.	"Jig-a-Jug"		11:31
2.	"My One and Only Love"	Robert Mellin, Guy Wood	11:02
3.	"Count Me Out"		7:08
4.	"Second Snow"		13:56
5.	"Remember"	Irving Berlin	9:56
6.	"Dialogue"		6:53
7.	"St. Thomas"	Sonny Rollins	12:14
8.	"Herbs and Roots"		15:30
9.	"Wait No Longer"		11:44
10.	"Neverend"		13:45
11.	"Just in Time"	Betty Comden, Adolph Green, Jule Styne	8:50
12.	"Mt. Zion"	Brian Blade	10:12
13.	"Slapstick"		5:51
14.	"Lyric"		11:58
Total length:			02:27:48

== Personnel ==
Musicians

- Joshua Redman – saxophone
- Peter Martin – piano
- Christopher James Thomas – double bass
- Brian Blade – drums
