= African Venus =

Studio album by Dewey Redman featuring Joshua Redman
- Released: 1994
- Recorded: December 11, 1992
- Genre: Jazz
- Length: 52:31
- Label: Venus, Evidence
- Producer: Big Apple Productions, Inc.

Dewey Redman chronology
Choices (1992)	African Venus (1994)	In London (1996)

Joshua Redman chronology
Wish (1993)	African Venus (1994)	MoodSwing (1994)

African Venus is an album by American jazz saxophonist Dewey Redman featuring his son Joshua Redman. It was recorded in 1992 and released on the Evidence label.

== Reception ==
The Allmusic review by Al Campbell awarded the album 3 stars stating "Not an essential disc, but far from a throwaway".

Professional ratings
Review scores
Source	Rating
Allmusic	3/5 stars

== Track listing ==
All compositions by Dewey Redman except as indicated

1. "African Venus" – 9:27
2. "Venus and Mars" – 7:48
3. "Mr. Sandman" (Pat Ballard) – 6:54
4. "Echo Prayer" – 5:53
5. "Satin Doll" (Duke Ellington, Johnny Mercer, Billy Strayhorn) – 8:23
6. "Take the 'A' Train" (Strayhorn) – 7:41
7. "Turnaround" (Ornette Coleman) – 6:25
- Recorded at the Sound on Sound Studio in New York City on December 11, 1992

== Personnel ==
Musicians

- Dewey Redman – tenor saxophone, alto saxophone, musette
- Joshua Redman – tenor saxophone
- Charles Eubanks – piano
- Anthony Cox – bass
- Carl Allen – drums
- Danny Sadownick – percussion

Production

- Big Apple Productions, Inc. – producer
- Tetsuo Hara – executive producer
- Peter Beckerman – engineer (recording)
- Rothacker Advertising & Design – art direction
- John Litweiler – liner notes
- Harrison Hurwitz – photography
