= Joshua Redman =

American jazz saxophonist and composer (born 1969)

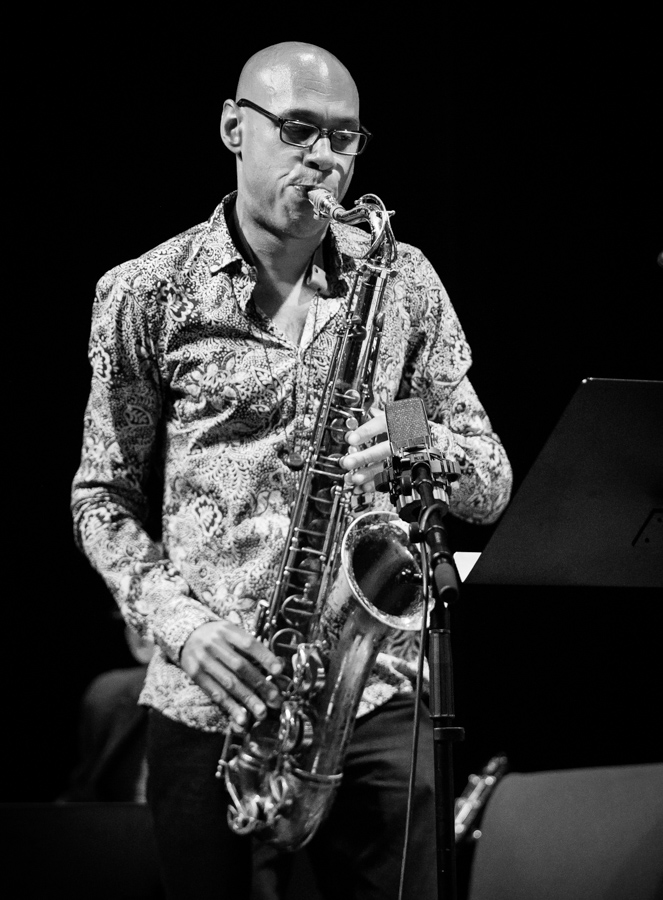
- Redman at the Kongsberg Jazzfestival in 2017

Background information
- Born: Joshua Redman Shedroff; February 1, 1969 (age 57); Berkeley, California
- Genre: Jazz
- Occupations: Musician, composer
- Instruments: Tenor saxophone; alto saxophone; soprano saxophone; keyboards
- Label: Blue Note
- Website: www.joshuaredman.com

Joshua Redman (born February 1, 1969) is an American jazz saxophonist and composer. He is the son of jazz saxophonist Dewey Redman (1931–2006).

== Life and career ==
Joshua Redman was born in Berkeley, California, to jazz saxophonist Dewey Redman and dancer and librarian Renee Shedroff. He is Jewish. He was exposed to many kinds of music at the Center for World Music in Berkeley, where his mother studied South Indian dance. Some of his earliest lessons in music and improvisation were on recorder with gamelan player Jody Diamond. He was exposed at an early age to a variety of music and instruments and began playing clarinet at age nine before switching to what became his primary instrument, the tenor saxophone, one year later. Redman has said he is self-taught on the saxophone and has cited John Coltrane, Ornette Coleman, Cannonball Adderley, his father Dewey Redman, as well as the Beatles, Aretha Franklin, The Temptations, Earth, Wind and Fire, Prince, The Police and Led Zeppelin as musical influences.

Redman graduated from Berkeley High School, class of 1986, after having been a part of the award-winning Berkeley High School Jazz Ensemble for all four years of high school. After graduation, Joshua frequented the classroom jam sessions of Bay Area pianist and professor of music (at Laney College in Oakland, California), Ed Kelly. It was there that he performed alongside saxophonist Robert Stewart.

In 1991, he graduated summa cum laude with a degree in social studies from Harvard University, where he was a member of Phi Beta Kappa. He had already been accepted by Yale Law School, but deferred entrance for what he believed was only going to be one year. Some of his friends had recently relocated to Brooklyn, and they were looking for another housemate to help with the rent. Redman accepted their invitation to move in, and almost immediately he found himself immersed in the New York jazz scene. He began jamming and gigging regularly with some of the leading jazz musicians of his generation and that of his father, including Brad Mehldau, Peter Martin, Mark Turner, Peter Bernstein, Roy Hargrove, Christian McBride, Kevin Hays, Jorge Rossy, Pat Metheny, Charlie Haden and Billy Higgins, among others.

Redman won the Thelonious Monk International Jazz Saxophone Competition in 1991, and began focusing on his musical career. He was signed by Warner Bros. Records and issued his first self-titled album in the spring of 1993, which subsequently earned Redman his first Grammy nomination. He continued to develop his style throughout the 1990s, beginning with a sideman appearance on Elvin Jones' Youngblood alongside Javon Jackson, and following up with an appearance on his father Dewey's 1992 record Choices. On his second album as a leader, Wish, he was joined by a notable lineup consisting of guitarist Pat Metheny, bassist Charlie Haden and drummer Billy Higgins; this group then toured as The Joshua Redman Quartet, featuring Christian McBride in place of Charlie Haden. He continued to work with various quartets, including one with pianist Brad Mehldau until forming a new trio, Elastic, with keyboardist Sam Yahel and drummer Brian Blade. The trio debuted under the moniker Yaya3, producing one album under this name. The same group of musicians made up the core on Redman's Elastic album, before becoming known as the Joshua Redman Elastic Band. Some of his works were featured on The Weather Channel's Local on the 8s. Redman performed in a fictitious supergroup, "The Louisiana Gator Boys", in the 1998 film Blues Brothers 2000, performing on "How Blue Can You Get?" and "New Orleans". Redman also appeared alongside Roy Hargrove and others on a series of albums released in the 1990s on RCA Novus by the Jazz Networks, an ensemble of American and Japanese musicians who focused on re-interpreting jazz standards primarily for the Japanese market.

=== 2000s ===
In 1999, Joshua Redman was immortalized in the children's TV show Arthur on PBS. He appeared in the tenth episode of the fourth season ("My Music Rules"), where it was rumored by the characters that he would get in a fight with famed cellist Yo-Yo Ma, who also appeared in the episode. Instead, when the two meet they are revealed to be fans of each other's music and collaborate together on a song to entertain children.

In 2000, Redman was named Artistic Director for the Spring Season of the non-profit jazz-presenting organization SFJAZZ. Redman co-founded the SFJAZZ with Executive Director Randall Kline, as the SFJAZZ Collective, an ensemble distinguished by the creativity of its members and a primary emphasis on composition.

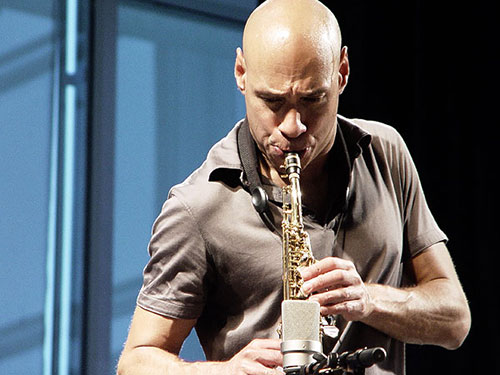
Redman at the Aarhus Jazz Festival in 2009

In 2004, Redman first sat in with Umphrey's McGee at their performance in Boston, Massachusetts, at the Paradise Rock Club. Redman has collaborated with Umphrey's McGee around 20 times since, including an all-improvised set in Madison, Wisconsin in January 2016.

In 2006, he performed with the New Zealand Symphony orchestra in composer John Psathas' concerto for saxophone and drumkit, Omnifenix, which was released in Rattle Records' album, View from Olympus. The album won Best Classical Album for 2007 in the New Zealand music awards.

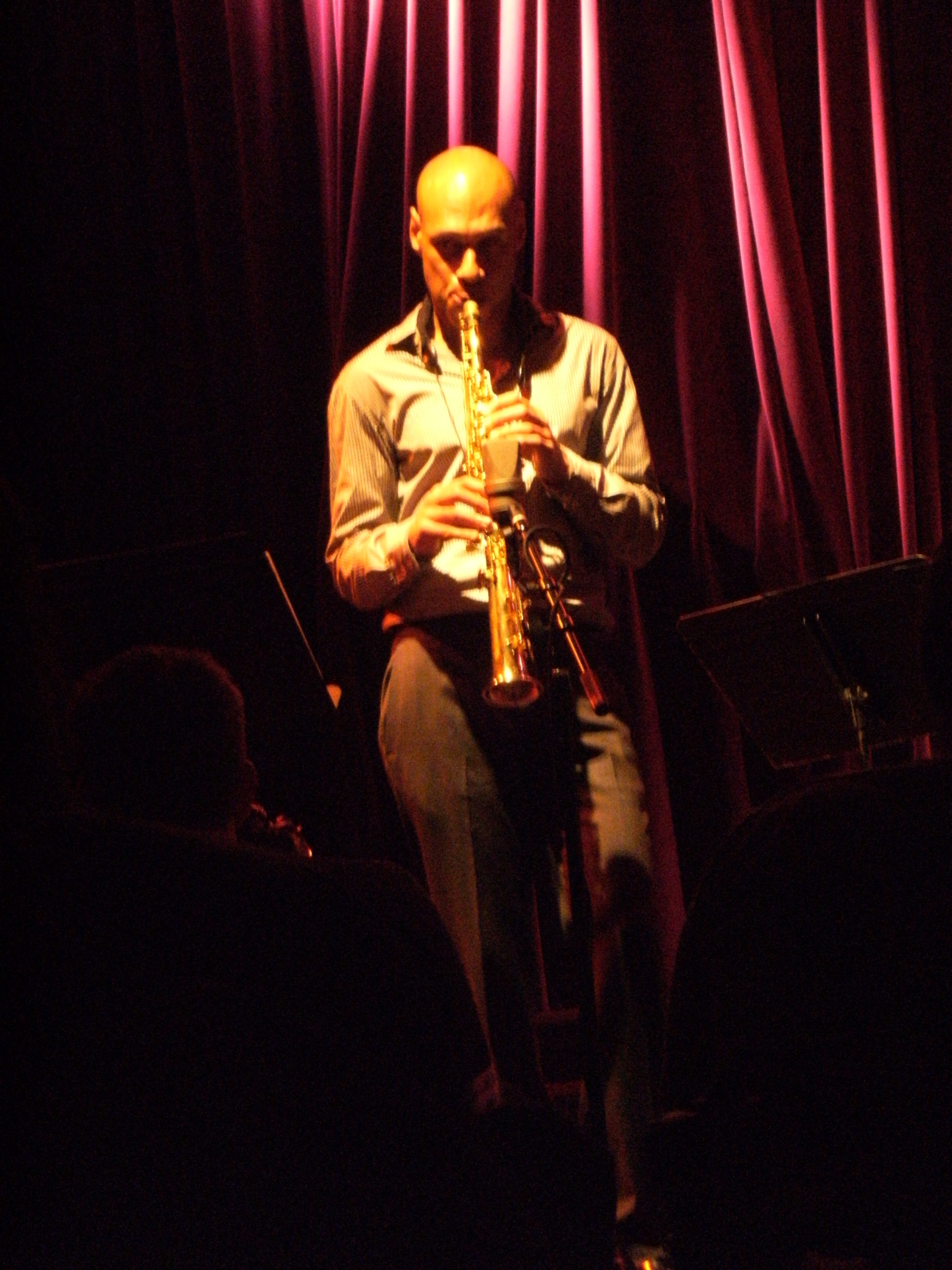
Redman at Seattle's Jazz Alley in 2009

In March 2007, Redman announced that he was taking a hiatus from both the SFJAZZ Artistic Directorship and the SFJAZZ Collective in order to focus on new projects. In April 2007, Nonesuch released Redman's first ever piano-less trio record, Back East, featuring Joshua alongside three bass and drum rhythm sections (Larry Grenadier & Ali Jackson, Christian McBride & Brian Blade, Reuben Rogers & Eric Harland) and three guest saxophonists (Chris Cheek, Joe Lovano and Dewey Redman). His January 2009 release, Compass, continued the trio tradition, and even included some tracks with a double-trio setup, featuring saxophone, two basses and two drummers.

=== 2010s ===
Starting in late 2009, Redman began performing with a new collaborative band called James Farm, featuring pianist Aaron Parks, bassist Matt Penman and drummer Eric Harland. They released their first self-titled album on April 26, 2011 and their follow-up album, City Folk on October 27, 2014.

In 2011, Redman was also an inaugural member of the Independent Music Awards' judging panel to support independent artists.

In early 2013, it was announced that Redman would release a new collection of vintage and contemporary ballads featuring a jazz quartet and an orchestral ensemble titled Walking Shadows. Produced by Redman's friend and frequent collaborator Brad Mehldau, the album also features Larry Grenadier (bass) and Brian Blade (drums). It was released on May 7, 2013 on Nonesuch. About Walking Shadows, the New York Times says "there hasn’t been a more sublimely lyrical gesture in his 20-year recording career."

On Sunday, December 8, 2013, Redman joined a group of jazz all-stars onstage at the Kennedy Center Honors in Washington, D.C., to pay tribute to honoree Herbie Hancock in performance. The event aired on December 29, 2013 on CBS.

In 2015, Redman received his third Grammy nomination for his solo on "Friend or Foe" from the album The Bad Plus Joshua Redman.

== Discography ==
=== Studio albums ===
==== As lead artist ====
List of studio albums with details and chart positions
Title	Details	Peak chart positions			
Title	Details	US Heat	US Jazz	US Trad. Jazz	US Class.
Joshua Redman	Released: March 23, 1993; Label: Warner Bros.; Format: CD, cassette, digital download, streaming	—	40	3	—
Wish	Released: September 21, 1993; Label: Warner Bros.; Format: CD, cassette, digital download, streaming	—	6	1	—
Freedom in the Groove	Released: September 20, 1996; Label: Warner Bros.; Format: CD, cassette, digital download, streaming	27	6	1	—
Timeless Tales (For Changing Times)	Released: September 22, 1998; Label: Warner Bros.; Format: CD, digital download, streaming	—	10	2	—
Beyond	Released: April 4, 2000; Label: Warner Bros.; Format: CD, cassette, digital download, streaming	47	5	2	—
Back East	Released: April 24, 2007; Label: Nonesuch; Format: CD, digital download, streaming	—	12	5	—
Compass	Released: January 13, 2009; Label: Nonesuch; Format: CD, digital download, streaming	34	4	4	—
Walking Shadows	Released: May 7, 2013; Label: Nonesuch; Format: CD, digital download, streaming	16	4	3	—
The Bad Plus Joshua Redman (with The Bad Plus)	Released: May 26, 2015; Label: Nonesuch; Format: CD, digital download, streaming	13	8	5	—
Nearness (with Brad Mehldau)	Released: September 9, 2016; Label: Nonesuch; Format: LP, CD, digital download, streaming	19	6	5	—
Still Dreaming (featuring Ron Miles, Scott Colley and Brian Blade)	Released: May 25, 2018; Label: Nonesuch; Format: LP, CD, digital download, streaming	25	2	2	—
Sun on Sand (with Brooklyn Rider)	Released: October 4, 2019; Label: Nonesuch; Format: CD, digital download, streaming	—	16	10	9
RoundAgain (with Brad Mehldau, Christian McBride and Brian Blade)	Released: July 10, 2020; Label: Nonesuch; Format: CD, digital download, streaming	—	7	5	—
LongGone (with Brad Mehldau, Christian McBride and Brian Blade)	Released: September 24, 2022; Label: Nonesuch; Format: CD, digital download, streaming	—	11	10	—
Where Are We (with Gabrielle Cavassa)	Released: September 15, 2023; Label: Blue Note; Format: CD, digital download, streaming	—	—	—	—
Words Fall Short	Released: June 20, 2025; Label: Blue Note; Format: LP, CD, digital download, streaming				

==== As Joshua Redman Quartet ====
List of studio albums with details and chart positions
Title	Details	Peak chart positions		
Title	Details	US Heat	US Jazz	US Trad. Jazz
MoodSwing	Released: September 13, 1994; Label: Warner Bros.; Format: CD, cassette, digital download, streaming	20	7	2
Passage of Time	Released: March 27, 2001; Label: Warner Bros.; Format: CD, digital download, streaming	—	6	4
Come What May	Released: March 29, 2019; Label: Nonesuch; Format: CD, digital download, streaming	12	2	2

==== As Joshua Redman Elastic Band ====
List of studio albums with details and chart positions
Title	Details	Peak chart positions	
Title	Details	US Jazz	US Trad. Jazz
Elastic	Released: September 10, 2002; Label: Warner Bros.; Format: CD, digital download, streaming	16	4
Momentum	Released: May 24, 2005; Label: Nonesuch; Format: CD, digital download, streaming	8	4

==== As leader of James Farm ====
List of studio albums with details and chart positions
Title	Details	Peak chart positions	
Title	Details	US Jazz	US Trad. Jazz
James Farm	Released: April 26, 2011; Label: Nonesuch; Format: CD, digital download, streaming	8	6
City Folk	Released: October 27, 2014; Label: Nonesuch; Format: CD, digital download, streaming	13	10

==== As a member of Yaya^{3} ====
With Sam Yahel and Brian Blade

List of studio albums with details
Title	Details
Yaya^{3}	Released: June 4, 2002; Label: Loma; Format: CD, digital download, streaming

==== As featured artist ====
List of studio albums with details
Title	Details
Choices (with Dewey Redman)	Released: 1992; Label: Enja; Format: CD, digital download, streaming
African Venus (Dewey Redman featuring Joshua Redman)	Released: 1994; Label: Venus, Evidence; Format: CD, SACD, digital download, streaming

=== Live albums ===
==== As lead artist ====
List of live albums with details and chart positions
Title	Details	Peak chart positions	
Title	Details	US Jazz	US Trad. Jazz
Captured Live!	Released: 2000; Label: Jazz Door; Format: CD, digital download, streaming	—	—
Trios Live	Released: June 17, 2014; Label: Nonesuch; Format: CD, digital download, streaming	6	4

==== As Joshua Redman Quartet ====
List of live albums with details and chart positions
Title	Details	Peak chart positions	
Title	Details	US Jazz	US Trad. Jazz
Blues for Pat: Live In San Francisco	Released: 1995; Label: Jazz Door; Format: CD, digital download, streaming	—	—
Spirit of the Moment – Live at the Village Vanguard	Released: August 29, 1995; Label: Warner Bros.; Format: CD, digital download, streaming	21	7

=== As sideman ===
- Bob Thiele Collective, Louis Satchmo (Red Baron, 1991)
- John Hicks, Friends Old and New (Novus, 1992)
- Elvin Jones, Youngblood (Enja, 1992)
- Joe Lovano, Tenor Legacy (Blue Note, 1993)
- Paul Motian, Paul Motian and the Electric Bebop Band (JMT, 1993)
- Milt Jackson, The Prophet Speaks (Qwest, 1994)
- Christian McBride, Gettin' to It (Verve, 1995)
- Lionel Hampton, For The Love of Music (MoJazz, 1995)
- Jonny King, Notes from the Underground (Enja, 1996)
- Chick Corea, Remembering Bud Powell (Stretch, 1997)
- Cedar Walton, Roots (Astor Place, 1997)
- McCoy Tyner Super Group, Prelude and Sonata (Key'stone, 1998)
- Kurt Rosenwinkel, Deep Song (Verve, 2005)
- Sam Yahel, Truth and Beauty (Origin, 2007)
- Brad Mehldau, Highway Rider (Nonesuch, 2010)
- Trondheim Jazz Orchestra, Triads and More (MNJ, 2010)
- Ferenc Nemeth, Triumph (Dreamer's Collective, 2012)

== Awards and nominations ==
Award	Year	Result	Category	Work	Reference
DownBeat Critics Poll	1993	Won	Tenor Saxophonist		
DownBeat Critics Poll	1994	Won	Jazz Artist of the Year		
DownBeat Critics Poll	1994	Won	Album of the Year	Wish	
DownBeat Critics Poll	2011	Won	Tenor Saxophone	Himself	
Grammy Awards	1994	Nominated	Best Jazz Instrumental Performance, Individual or Group	Joshua Redman	
Grammy Awards	1998	Nominated	Best Jazz Instrumental Performance, Individual or Group	Remembering Bud Powell	
Grammy Awards	2006	Nominated	Best Contemporary Jazz Album	Momentum	
Grammy Awards	2008	Nominated	Best Jazz Instrumental Album, Individual or Group	Back East	
Grammy Awards	2016	Nominated	Best Improvised Jazz Solo	"Friend or Foe"	
Grammy Awards	2017	Nominated	Best Jazz Instrumental Album	Nearness	
Grammy Awards	2019	Nominated	Best Jazz Instrumental Album	Still Dreaming	
Grammy Awards	2020	Nominated	Best Jazz Instrumental Album	Come What May	
Grammy Awards	2021	Nominated	Best Improvised Jazz Solo	"Moe Honk"	
Grammy Awards	2021	Nominated	Best Jazz Instrumental Album	RoundAgain	
Grammy Awards	2023	Nominated	Best Jazz Instrumental Album	LongGone	
JazzTimes	1992	Won	Best New Artist	Himself	
Thelonious Monk International Jazz Competition	1991	Won	N/A	Himself	
