= Live at the House of Tribes =

Live album by Wynton Marsalis
- Released: August 30, 2005
- Recorded: December 15, 2002
- Venues: House of Tribes, New York City
- Genre: Jazz
- Label: Blue Note
- Producer: Delfeayo Marsalis

Wynton Marsalis chronology
A Love Supreme (2005)	Live at the House of Tribes (2005)	Don't Be Afraid: The Music of Charles Mingus (2005)

Live at the House of Tribes is an album by Wynton Marsalis that was released in 2005. The performance was recorded in December, 2002 in front of fifty people at a small community theater space in New York's East Village.

== Reception ==
Professional ratings
Review scores
Source	Rating
AllMusic	link
The Penguin Guide to Jazz Recordings	4/4 stars

AllMusic's Matt Collar stated, "Loose, swinging, funky, and spirited, Live at the House of Tribes is an absolute joy." Jazz critic Ben Ratliff of The New York Times said, "Throughout the record, the playing almost never goes outside of tonality, and the rhythm section holds fast to swing. But swing brings out the best in these players; the music is fully alive and afire with ideas. It makes you want to have been there." The Penguin Guide to Jazz Recordings describes the album as “a near-perfect live record, packed with atmosphere and marked by some powerful, wise playing”.

== Track listing ==
1. "Green Chimneys" (Thelonious Monk) – 15:49
2. "Just Friends" (Klenner, Sam M. Lewis) – 17:48
3. "You Don't Know What Love Is" (Gene de Paul, Don Raye) – 12:13
4. "Donna Lee" (Miles Davis) – 6:47
5. "What Is This Thing Called Love?" (Cole Porter) – 10:27
6. "Second Line" (Paul Barbarin) – 3:55

== Personnel ==
Musicians

- Wynton Marsalis – trumpet
- Wessell Anderson – alto saxophone
- Eric Lewis – piano
- Kengo Nakamura – double bass
- Joe Farnsworth – drums
- Robert M. Rucker – tambourine (track 6)
- Orlando Rodriquez – percussion (tracks 1,2,5,6)

Production

- Delfeayo Marsalis – producer
- Patrick L. Smith – mixer
- Stanley Crouch – liner notes
