= Trios Live =

Live album by Joshua Redman
- Released: June 17, 2014
- Recorded: October 2009; February 2013
- Venue: Jazz Standard, New York, NY; Blues Alley, Washington D.C.
- Genre: Post-bop
- Length: 58:12
- Label: Nonesuch Records 541805-2
- Producer: Joshua Redman, James Farber

Joshua Redman chronology
Walking Shadows (2013)	Trios Live (2014)	City Folk (2014)

Professional ratings
Review scores
Source	Rating
AllMusic	3.5/5 stars
The Buffalo News	3.5/4 stars
The Guardian	4/5 stars
Jazzwise	4/5 stars
Tom Hull	B+

Trios Live is a live album by American jazz saxophonist Joshua Redman. The album was released on June 17, 2014 via Nonesuch label.

== Reception ==
Jeff Simon of The Guardian wrote, "The spirit in these live performances – often punctuated vocally by the audience and members of the group – is steadfast and superb."

== Track listing ==
No.	Title	Writer(s)	Length
1.	"Moritat (Mack the Knife)"	Bertolt Brecht, Kurt Weill	12:05
2.	"Never Let Me Go"	Ray Evans, Jay Livingston	6:39
3.	"Soul Dance"	Redman	6:45
4.	"Act Natural"	Redman	12:28
5.	"Mantra #5"	Redman	7:40
6.	"Trinkle, Tinkle"	Thelonious Monk	5:57
7.	"The Ocean"	John Bonham, John Paul Jones, Jimmy Page, Robert Plant	6:38
Total length:			58:12
