= MoodSwing (Joshua Redman album) =

Moodswing

Studio album by Joshua Redman Quartet
- Released: 1994
- Recorded: March 8–10, 1994
- Studios: Power Station, New York City
- Genre: Jazz
- Length: 69:39
- Label: Warner Bros.
- Producer: Matt Pierson

Joshua Redman chronology
African Venus (1994)	Moodswing (1994)	Spirit of the Moment – Live at the Village Vanguard (1995)

Professional ratings
Review scores
Source	Rating
AllMusic	4/5 stars
The Buffalo News	3/4 stars
The Encyclopedia of Popular Music	4/5 stars
The Penguin Guide to Jazz Recordings	3.5/4 stars
PopMatters	7/10
The Rolling Stone Jazz & Blues Album Guide	4/5 stars
Tom Hull	B+

MoodSwing is a 1994 studio album by American jazz saxophonist Joshua Redman. All compositions on this album are originals written by Redman. The album was re-released on vinyl in 2009. Redman's bandmates here are Brad Mehldau on piano, Christian McBride on acoustic bass, and Brian Blade on drums. The next album by this quartet, RoundAgain, was released 26 years later in July 2020.

== Reception ==
Will Layman of PopMatters wrote "Moodswing seeks to be that one jazz record you really want to play for your “non-jazz” friends". Scott Yanow of AllMusic stated "Redman performs a full set of originals which, although not derivative, do fit into the straight-ahead tradition. At this point in time, Redman was growing from album to album, having already started at a high level. A fine outing." Howard Reich of the Chicago Tribune added "The artistic growth of the young tenor saxophonist Joshua Redman remains something to behold, with virtually every major appearance showing significant advances in the musical breadth, emotional depth and intellectual savvy of his work. Consider "Mood Swing," his most deeply communicative recording to date. Redman, for all his technique and improvisational gifts, has taken pains to make a recording that speaks eloquently to the connoisseur and the casual listener alike."

The Buffalo News review by Jeff Simon commented, "Disc titles don't come more apt and succinct than Joshua Redman's "MoodSwing," which collects 11 moods of steadily ascending liveliness in some gorgeous Redman originals that can mostly be reduced to little more than artful vamps. Therein lies the problem. As beautiful and clever as some of these tunes are by everyone's favorite Generation X tenor player... and as superb as his quartet's playing is, there is some unnecessary monotony to this disc." Doug Ramsey of JazzTimes added, "Redman's authority and presence do not depend on volume... But he commands attention and holds it through the album."

The album was nominated in 1995 for Soul Train Music Award for Best Jazz Album.

== Track listing ==
All tracks are written by Joshua Redman.

No.	Title	Length
1.	"Sweet Sorrow"	8:42
2.	"Chill"	7:43
3.	"Rejoice"	11:12
4.	"Faith"	4:33
5.	"Alone in the Morning"	5:06
6.	"Mischief"	5:47
7.	"Dialogue"	5:45
8.	"The Oneness of Two (In Three)"	5:08
9.	"Past in the Present"	4:53
10.	"Obsession"	6:50
11.	"Headin' Home"	4:07
Total length:		69:39

== Personnel ==
Musicians

- Joshua Redman – tenor saxophone, soprano saxophone
- Brad Mehldau – piano
- Christian McBride – bass
- Brian Blade – drums

Production

- Matt Pierson – producer
- James Farber – engineer (recording, mixing)
- Greg Calbi – engineer (mastering)
- Scott Hull – engineer (mastering)
- Rory Romano – engineer (assistant)
- Tony Black – engineer (assistant)
- Mary Ann Topper – management, booking
- Jennifer Zeitlin – production coordinator
- Jeri Heiden – art direction, design
- Tom Recchion – art direction, design
- Jim Merrill – photography of band
- Marc Hom – photography of Joshua
