= Quartets: Live at the Village Vanguard =

Live album by Joe Lovano
- Released: 1995
- Recorded: March 12, 1994; January 22, 1995
- Genre: Jazz
- Length: 127:27
- Label: Blue Note
- Producer: Joe Lovano

Joe Lovano chronology
Tenor Legacy (1994)	Quartets: Live at the Village Vanguard (1995)	Rush Hour (1995)

Quartets: Live at the Village Vanguard is a live album by the American jazz saxophonist Joe Lovano recorded at the Village Vanguard in 1994 and 1995 and released on the Blue Note label.

== Reception ==
The AllMusic review by Scott Yanow stated: "Named Jazz Album of the Year by readers of Downbeat Magazine, this double CD features tenor saxophonist Joe Lovano during two appearances at the Village Vanguard recorded ten months apart... In both cases, Joe Lovano is heard in prime form, making this an easily recommended two-fer".

Professional ratings
Review scores
Source	Rating
AllMusic	4.5/5 stars
The Encyclopedia of Popular Music	3/5 stars
Tom Hull	A−
Los Angeles Times	3/4 stars
The Penguin Guide to Jazz Recordings	3.5/4 stars

Don Heckman of the Los Angeles Times commented, "the two CDs in this new release are demonstrations in just how good he can be, regardless of the music’s style. Recorded live in March 1994 and January 1995 with two very different ensembles, they showcase contrasting aspects of Lovano’s improvisational strengths."

== Track listing ==
All compositions by Joe Lovano except as indicated
Disc One

1. "Fort Worth" [Set 2] - 10:01
2. "Birds of Springtime Gone By" [Set 1] - 6:43
3. "I Can't Get Started" [Set 1] (Vernon Duke, Ira Gershwin) - 8:32
4. "Uprising" [Set 3] - 7:35
5. "Sail Away" [Set 2] (Tom Harrell) - 10:51
6. "Blues Not to Lose" [Set 3] (Eddie Boyd) - 9:19
7. "Song and Dance" [Set 2] - 8:27

Disc Two

1. "Lonnie's Lament" [Set 2] (John Coltrane) - 11:12
2. "Reflections" [Set 2] (Thelonious Monk) - 9:51
3. "Little Willie Leaps" [Set 1*] (Miles Davis) - 9:22
4. "This Is All I Ask" [Set 2] (Gordon Jenkins) - 9:18
5. "26-2" [Set 2] (Coltrane) - 9:42
6. "Duke Ellington's Sound of Love" [Set 3] (Charles Mingus) - 6:15
7. "Sounds of Joy" [Set 1] - 10:19

- Recorded at the Village Vanguard in New York City on March 12, 1994 (Disc One) and January 20 & *22, 1995 (Disc Two)

== Personnel ==
- Joe Lovano – tenor saxophone, soprano saxophone, C melody saxophone
- Tom Harrell - trumpet, flugelhorn (Disc One)
- Mulgrew Miller – piano (Disc Two)
- Anthony Cox (Disc One), Christian McBride (Disc Two) – bass
- Billy Hart (Disc One), Lewis Nash (Disc Two) – drums
