= Come What May (band) =

American rock band from Athens, Georgia

- Origin: Athens, Georgia
- Genres: hardcore punk, metalcore, melodic hardcore, melodic metalcore
- Years active: 2009–present
- Members: Joey Hreha; Timothy Watts; Evan Cerwonka; Garrett Lennox; Patrick Farace
- Website: facebook.com/cwmrock

Come What May is an American rock band and they primarily play melodic hardcore and melodic metalcore. They are from Athens, Georgia. The band started making music in 2009. The band released a studio album, Strange Dialect, in 2012 with The Cadence Music Group.

== Background ==
Come What May is a hardcore and metal band from Athens, Georgia. Their members are vocalist and guitarist Joey Hreha, vocalist and keyboardist Timothy Watts, guitarist Evan Cerwonka, bassist Garrett Lennox, and drummer Patrick Farace.

== Music history ==
The band commenced as a musical entity in May 2009, with their first release, Strange Dialect, a studio album, that was released on June 12, 2012.

== Members ==
Current members

- Joey Hreha - vocals, guitar
- Timothy Watts - vocals, keyboards
- Evan Cerwonka - guitar
- Garrett Lennox - vocals, bass
- Patrick Farace - drums

== Discography ==
Studio albums

- Strange Dialect (June 12, 2012)
