= Joshua Redman (album) =

Studio album by Joshua Redman
- Released: March 23, 1993
- Recorded: 1992
- Studio: Skyline, New York City; Power Station, New York City
- Genre: Jazz
- Length: 1:01:21
- Label: Warner Bros.
- Producer: Matt Pierson

Joshua Redman chronology
Choices (1992)	Joshua Redman (1993)	Wish (1993)

Professional ratings
Review scores
Source	Rating
AllMusic	3.5/5 stars
The Encyclopedia of Popular Music	4/5 stars
Tom Hull	A−
The Penguin Guide to Jazz Recordings	4/4 stars
The Rolling Stone Jazz & Blues Album Guide	3/5 stars

Joshua Redman is a 1993 album by American jazz saxophonist Joshua Redman. This is his debut studio album as a leader. This self-titled album combined with the follow-up album Wish sold over a quarter of a million copies.

== Recording ==
The album was recorded at Skyline Studios, NYC on September 15, 1992. Track 3 was recorded live to Two-Track at Power Station, NYC on June 4, 1992. Track 6 was recorded live to Two-Track at Power Station, NYC on May 27, 1992.

== Reception ==
Alex Henderson of AllMusic wrote, "Joshua Redman isn't a masterpiece, but it let us know that he was certainly someone to keep an eye on."

== Track listing ==
1. "Blues on Sunday" (Joshua Redman)
2. "Wish" (Joshua Redman)
3. "Trinkle Tinkle" (Thelonious Monk) – live
4. "Echoes" (Joshua Redman)
5. "I Got You (I Feel Good)" (James Brown)
6. "Body & Soul" (Edward Heyman, Frank Eyton, Robert Sour, John W. Green) – live
7. "Tribalism" (Joshua Redman)
8. "Groove X (By Any Means Necessary)" (Joshua Redman)
9. "Salt Peanuts" (Dizzy Gillespie)
10. "On the Sunny Side of the Street" (Jimmy McHugh, Dorothy Fields)
11. "Sublimation" (Joshua Redman)

== Personnel ==
- Joshua Redman – tenor saxophone
- Kevin Hays – piano
- Christian McBride – double bass
- Gregory Hutchinson – drums
- Clarence Penn – drums (track 3 only)
- Mike LeDonne – piano (track 6 only)
- Paul LaDuca – double bass (track 6 only)
- Kenny Washington – drums (track 6 only)

== Chart performance ==
Chart	Peak position
Billboard Top Jazz Albums (1993)	3
