= Tenor Legacy (Joe Lovano album) =

Studio album by Joe Lovano
- Released: 1994
- Recorded: June 18, 1993
- Studio: Skyline, New York City
- Genre: Jazz
- Length: 66:09
- Label: Blue Note
- Producer: Joe Lovano

Joe Lovano chronology
| Universal Language (1993) | Tenor Legacy (1994) | Quartets: Live at the Village Vanguard (1995) |

Tenor Legacy is an album by the American jazz saxophonist Joe Lovano, recorded in 1993 and released on the Blue Note label.

== Reception ==
The AllMusic review by Scott Yanow stated: "Lovano has created a set with a great deal of variety and some surprising moments".

Professional ratings
Review scores
| Source | Rating |
|---|---|
| AllMusic | 4/5 stars |
| The Encyclopedia of Popular Music | 4/5 stars |
| Tom Hull | A− |
| The Penguin Guide to Jazz Recordings | 3.5/4 stars |
| The Rolling Stone Jazz & Blues Album Guide | 5/5 stars |

== Track listing ==
All compositions by Joe Lovano except as indicated

1. "Miss Etna" - 6:30
2. "Love Is a Many Splendored Thing" (Sammy Fain, Paul Francis Webster) - 6:44
3. "Blackwell's Message" - 5:36
4. "Laura" (Johnny Mercer, David Raksin) - 4:31
5. "Introspection" (Thelonious Monk) - 9:05
6. "In the Land of Ephesus" - 6:58
7. "To Her Ladyship" (Billy Frazier) - 9:03
8. "Web of Fire" - 5:51
9. "Rounder's Mood" (Booker Little) - 8:20
10. "Bread and Wine" - 3:31

== Personnel ==
- Joe Lovano – tenor saxophone
- Joshua Redman - tenor saxophone
- Mulgrew Miller – piano
- Christian McBride – bass
- Don Alias - percussion
- Lewis Nash – drums
