= John Gall (designer) =

American graphic designer

John Gall (born 1963 in New Jersey), is an American graphic designer known primarily for the design of book covers.

He is a graduate of Rutgers University.

Gall is currently the creative director of Alfred A. Knopf. He was formerly creative director of Abrams Books, and prior to that, vice president and art director for Vintage Books and Anchor Books, both imprints of Random House. He is well known for the minimal wit in his design style and is notable for the sheer number of book covers he has designed. His awards include over 60 AIGA Annual Awards. He has also worked with Alfred A. Knopf, Farrar, Straus and Giroux and Grove Press. Gall has also designed CD covers for Nonesuch Records.

Among the authors for whom Gall has designed several covers are Haruki Murakami, Margaret Atwood, and Don DeLillo.

His work is featured in By Its Cover: Modern American Book Cover Design by Ned Drew and Paul Sternberger, Less is More: The New Simplicity in Graphic Design by Steve Heller and Anne Fink. In addition to his work as art director and designer, Gall is an instructor at the School of Visual Arts.

== Bibliography ==
- Sayonara Home Run!: The Art of the Japanese Baseball Card, by John Gall, Gary Engel and Steven Heller (graphic design).
- 2D: Visual Basics for Designers, by Robin Landa, Rose Gonnella and Steven Brower, with foreword by John Gall.
- John Gall Collages 2008-2018 (2018)

== See also ==
- Spine Out, Gall's blog
- Over 100 of the covers art directed and designed by Gall online at the Book Cover Archive
- Video of Gall online at Barnes & Noble
- Feature article on Gall online at Step Inside Design
