= Walter Sear =

American film producer

Walter Edmond Sear (27 April 1930 – 29 April 2010) was an American recording engineer, musician, instrument importer and designer, inventor, composer and film producer. He was considered a pioneer in the use of the synthesizer and an expert on vintage recording equipment. Sear ran the Sear Sound recording studio in Hell's Kitchen, known for its vast collection of vintage analog recording equipment and patronized by artists including Steely Dan, Sonic Youth, David Bowie, Wynton Marsalis, Paul McCartney and Patti Smith.

== Career ==
=== Tuba player and designer ===
Sear started his long and varied career as a classical tuba player. After 4 years at the Curtis Institute of Music, he occasionally subbed as the tuba player for the Philadelphia Orchestra. He later worked as a freelancer in New York City, playing for 6 years with the Radio City Music Hall pit orchestra as well as The Symphony of the Air, The Goldman Band, Sound of Music and numerous commercial studios.

In the late 1950s, he became interested in tuba design and began importing European tubas made to his own specifications from the Czech company Cerveny and the Belgian companies De Prins and Mahillion. He sold these tubas from a Manhattan showroom. These tubas, popular because of their relatively low price, unique design and quality workmanship, were typically engraved with the name "Walter E. Sear, NYC" on the bell. Sear estimated that he imported/produced approximately 2000 such instruments. His background in chemistry (Temple University with BA degree from the George Washington University) helped with the metallurgical processes that he innovated. He also held a B.M. from the Catholic University of America and undertook doctoral studies at Columbia University.

=== Electronic music ===
In the late 1950s, he became friendly with Robert Moog after buying parts from him for a home-made theremin. In the early 1960s, Sear used his music industry connections to become one of the earliest sales and distribution partners of R.A. Moog. He encouraged Moog to make his synthesizers more practical; eventually leading (in the late 1960s) to the development of portable synthesizers which could be used during live performances. Sear also became known as a performer and composer (using the Moog synthesizer) for various movie soundtracks including Midnight Cowboy.

Sear's pop compositions were also heard on his Command Records album, The Copper-Plated Integrated Circuit.

=== Sear Sound ===
In 1964 Sear built his first recording studio; one of the first commercial electronic music studios. In 1972, the studio moved to the Paramount Hotel at 235 West 46th Street, near Times Square in the Theater District of Midtown Manhattan in New York City in 1971. In 1988, the studio moved to larger recording facilities on the 6th floor of 353 West 48th Street, a former Hit Factory studio location.

Sear Sound is the oldest recording studio in New York City, with more than 285 vintage and contemporary microphones, four rebuilt Studer recorders used by the Beatles at Abbey Road and one of the earliest Moog synthesizers, built by Sear and Moog. Sear Sound is the oldest continuously operated studio in New York. The studio has been used by numerous notable artists, including Steely Dan, Björk, Lenny Kravitz, Yoko Ono, David Bowie, Lou Reed, Wayne Shorter and Norah Jones.

== Personal life ==
Born in New Orleans, Louisiana, Sear moved with his family to Jackson Heights, Queens at the age of one. Sear received an Honorable Discharge from the regular United States Air Force with the rank of Staff Sergeant. He served at Bolling Air Force Base in Washington, D.C. Sear died on April 29, 2010 at the age of 80 in New York City.
