= Atlantis (Wayne Shorter album) =

Studio album by Wayne Shorter
- Released: 1985
- Recorded: 1985
- Studio: Producers I & II (Los Angeles, California); Meta Music (Los Angeles, California); Crystal Sound (Los Angeles, CA)
- Genre: Jazz, Latin jazz, jazz fusion, world fusion
- Length: 42:21
- Label: Columbia
- Producer: Wayne Shorter, Joseph Vitarelli

Wayne Shorter chronology
Native Dancer (1975)	Atlantis (1985)	Phantom Navigator (1987)

Professional ratings
Review scores
Source	Rating
AllMusic	1.5/5 stars

Atlantis is the sixteenth album by Wayne Shorter. It was released on the Columbia label in 1985 and was Shorter's first solo album since 1974.

== Background ==
The recording is notable in Shorter's body of work both for its relative lack of improvisation and for the high level of its compositions and group arrangements. Brazilian and funk rhythms are featured on several tracks, as is a mixture of electric and acoustic instrumentation. The composition "Shere Khan, the Tiger" was previously recorded by a group including Shorter and Carlos Santana on the latter's 1980 album The Swing of Delight.

Several of the compositions on this album would continue to feature in Shorter's repertoire well into 2012, most notably the title piece. The cover art for the album is a pastel portrait of Shorter by actor Billy Dee Williams. Compositionally, "Atlantis" is noteworthy due to the inclusion of unusual intervallic melodies and a sense of economy and space generated through the use of parallel dominant 9th suspended chords coupled with contrapuntal bass lines. This approach is exemplified by the composition "On the Eve of Departure" which programmatically resembles "When worlds Collide", the George Pal Sci-Fi classic.

== Track listing ==
All compositions by Wayne Shorter, with additional contributors noted.

1. "Endangered Species" (Joseph Vitarelli) – 4:47
2. "The Three Marias" – 5:48
3. "The Last Silk Hat" – 5:25
4. "When You Dream" (E. Lee) – 4:28
5. "Who Goes There!" – 5:29
6. "Atlantis" – 4:34
7. "Shere Khan, the Tiger" – 2:15
8. "Crianças" – 3:40
9. "On the Eve of Departure" – 5:55

== Personnel ==
Musicians

- Wayne Shorter – soprano saxophone, tenor saxophone
- Joseph Vitarelli – keyboards (track 1), Synclavier (1)
- Michael Hoenig – Synclavier programming (1)
- Yaron Gershovsky – acoustic piano (2–9)
- Michiko Hill – acoustic piano (2–9)
- Larry Klein – electric bass (2–9)
- Ralph Humphrey – drums (1)
- Alex Acuña – drums, percussion (2–9)
- Lenny Castro – percussion (1)
- Jim Walker – flute, alto flute, piccolo (2–9)
- Diana Acuña, Dee Dee Bellson, Nani Brunel, Trove Davenport, Sanaa Larhan, Edgy Lee and Kathy Lucien – vocals

Production

- Wayne Shorter – producer
- Joseph Vitarelli – producer (track 1)
- George Butler – executive producer
- Rick Hart – engineer (1)
- Howard Siegel – engineer (2–9)
- Jim McMahon – assistant engineer (2–9)
- Bernie Grundman – mastering
- Billy Dee Williams – portrait
- David Rubinson – management

== See also ==
- Weather Report, Sportin' Life (1985)
