= Santos Iñurrieta =

Spanish painter (1950–2023)

Santos Iñurrieta de la Fuente
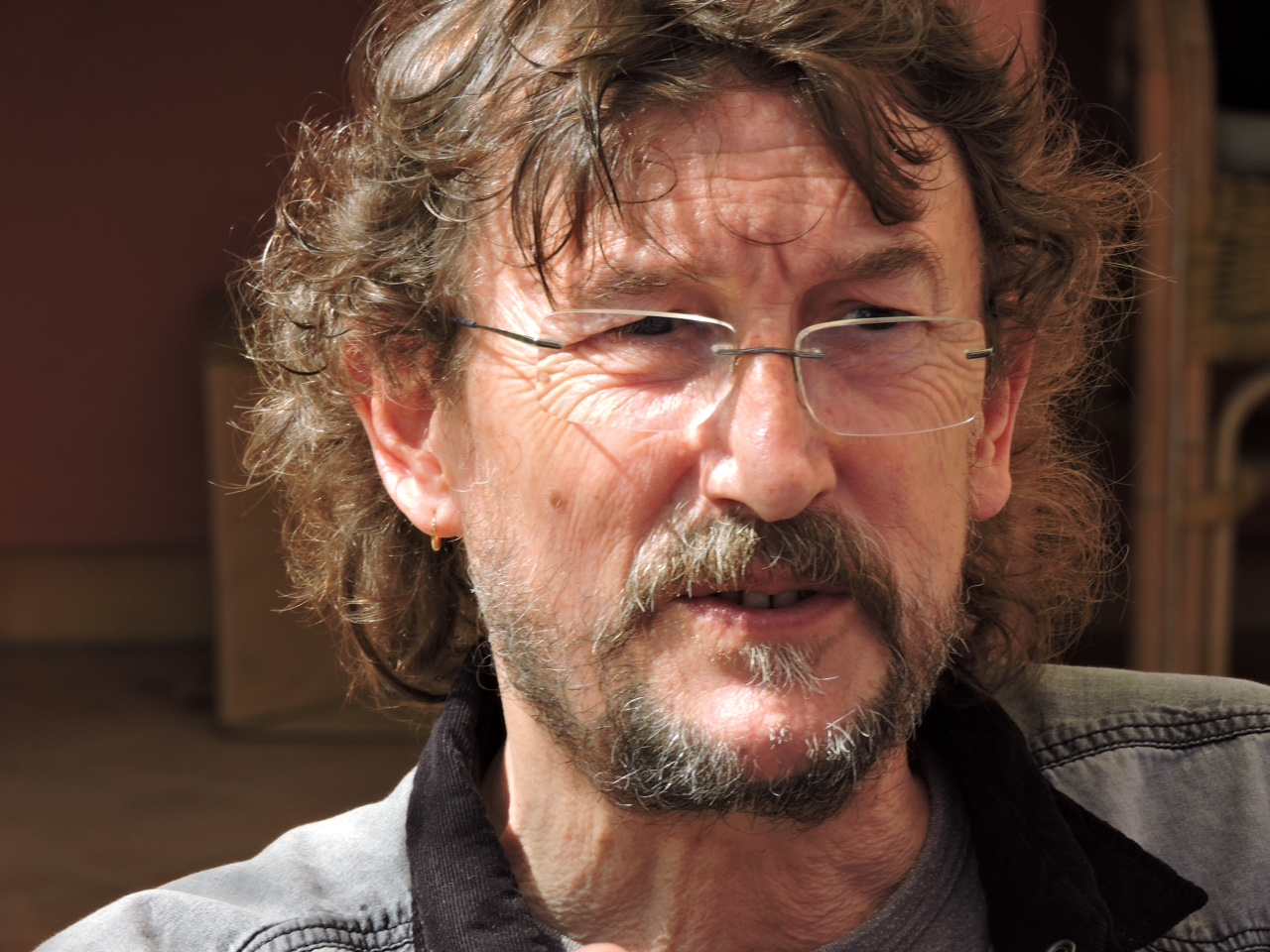
- Born: 8 July 1950; Vitoria-Gasteiz, Spain
- Died: 10 December 2023 (aged 73); Mallorca, Spain
- Education: School of Arts and Crafts of Vitoria
- Known for: Painting
- Website: santosinurrieta.com

Santos Iñurrieta de la Fuente (8 July 1950 – 10 December 2023) was a Spanish painter, known for his contributions to the Basque art scene and his focus on social and political themes.

He was a significant figure in Basque contemporary art, especially during the 20th and 21st centuries.

== Early life and education ==
Iñurrieta was born in Vitoria, Spain, in 1950. He studied at the School of Arts and Crafts of Vitoria from 1964 to 1967. At the end of the 1960s and early 1970s, he participated, together with other artists, in the group Klink, which was involved in anti-franquist militancy, providing a collective open space. He was very involved in the development of the cultural network in his hometown. He supported other artists, musicians, actors, movie directors in his studio, which grew into an anti-establishment, interdisciplinary breeding ground.

== Artistic career ==
Iñurrieta began his artistic career with a focus on volumetric abstraction, using geometric forms and anthropomorphic elements. By the late 1970s, he was part of the Basque art exhibition Erakusketa, which helped introduce Basque art to a broader Spanish audience.

Around the late 1980s, after spending a year on the island of Lanzarote, his style shifted to a more-figurative approach, incorporating irony, surrealism and symbolism.

Along his artistic life he had many exhibitions, especially in the Basque Country, but also in Belgium, Paris and Mallorca. Iñurrieta is considered one of the most prominent artists in the Basque Country.

His last exhibitions were in the Museum of Contemporary Art Artium, in Vitoria. Other exhibitions in 2018 were at Zas and Zuloa Irudia.

After Iñurrieta's death in 2023, he received two homages in his hometown, a cultural gathering in two centres, where artists presented works dedicated him.

Album covers and posters for events such as the Vitoria-Gasteiz Jazz Festival are also among his works, always implied in the cultural tissue.

== Life in Mallorca ==
In 1992, Iñurrieta moved to Mallorca, where his work took on a new direction influenced by the island's atmosphere. His paintings are characterized by vibrant colors and elaborate imagery. His work became more argumentative, ironic, surreal, symbolist and scathing, a sharp criticism of modern society, with a deep load of irony highlighted by the extravagant and descriptive titles of his paintings.

His work includes references to the artists he admires most (Matisse, Picasso, Gris, Hockney, among others).

He remained active in the art scene, exhibiting his work both in Spain and internationally until his death in 2023.

== Legacy ==
Iñurrieta's work is included in several art collections and museums, including the Bilbao Fine Arts Museum, the Museum of Spanish Abstract Art in Cuenca, and the Álava Provincial Museum in Vitoria.

== Exhibitions ==
Iñurrieta participated in numerous exhibitions throughout his career, including:

- 1973: Individual in Caja de Ahorros de Pamplona. Individual in Salones de Ajuria in Vitoria. Individual at Mikeldi, Bilbao
- 1972: Individual in the Salones de Cultura in Vitoria. Individual in Mikeldi gallery in Bilbao, and in the Salas Municipales in Durango
- 1974: Galeria Pez in San Sebastián. Collective "Un escultor y cuatro pintores Alaveses" at The San Telmo Museum in San Sebastián and in Pamplona at the Pabellones de Arte de la Ciudadela
- 1976: Galería Luzaro, Bilbao
- 1977: Galeria B in San Sebastián
- 1978: Colective "Euskal Artea 78-Arte vasco 78" in Bilbao
- 1979: Colective "Erakusketa 79" at Velazquez palace in Madrid
- 1981: "Arte Eder 81" Feria de Arte Contemporáneo de Bilbao. Individual at Ederti gallery in Bilbao
- 1983: Solo exhibition at El Almacén Gallery, Lanzarote.
- 1984: Galeria Windsor, Bilbao. Galeria Caja de Ahorros Provincial de Vitoria.
- 1987: Exposición "Gernika 37-38, en Guernika. Caja de Ahorros provincial de Vitoria
- 1988: Serigraphy exhibition at Fundación Caja Provincial. Mural work in homage to Oteiza at Sala San Prudencio Art Gallery. Mural work at the hotel Gasteiz Vitoria.
- 1989: Collective "Basque Artists" at Bilbao Saving Bank. Individual at Orma, Sala Amárica. Mural work at the Basque Court. Individual at Dendaraba Art Gallery.
- 1990: Durango Art and History Museum. Pintzel Gallery in Pamplona. Sala San Prudencio, Vitoria.
- 1991: Art International Gallery, Bilbao. Colective at the Bienal of Cuba, La Habana. Galeria Xerea, Valencia.
- 1992: Arco, Madrid with Galeria Xerea". Sala Olaguibel, Vitoria. Sala S´agrícola, Mallorca
- 1993: Sala Lourdes Ugarabe, Vitoria. Galeria De Griffioen, Antwerp. Pabellón Mixtos, La Ciudadela, Pamplona
- 1996: Torre de Ses Puntes, Mallorca
- 1997: Galeria Berta Belaza, Bilbao. Artexpo, Toulusse. Interart, Valencia. Arte Xerea, Valencia.
- 1998. Artexpo, Barcelona.
- 1999: Sala Luis de Ajuria, Vitoria
- 2000: Galeria La Brocha, Bilbao. Galeria Clerigos, Lugo exhibition "La Isla". Galeria Xerea, Valencia.
- 2002: "Kajikas" at Zuloa Irudia, Vitoria. Epelde Mardaras Gallery, Bilbao.
- 2002: Zuloa Irudia. Camí de la Mar, Mallorca.
- 2005: Galeria Byzance together with the sculptor Serge Van De Putt, Paris.
- 2017: "Ke usted lo pase bien" – a major exhibition at the Artium Museum in Vitoria.
- 2018: Zuloa "Suite Menut"

== Awards ==
- 1973: Banco de Vizcaya Prize at the VI Gran Premio de Pintura Vasca, San Sebastián.
- 1982: Second prize at Gure Artea, organized by the Basque Government.
