= 1+1 (Herbie Hancock and Wayne Shorter album) =

1 + 1

Studio album by Herbie Hancock and Wayne Shorter
- Released: July 1997
- Recorded: 1997
- Studio: Garage Sale, LA
- Genre: Post-bop; free improvisation
- Length: 61:35
- Label: Verve; Polygram
- Producer: Wayne Shorter, Herbie Hancock

Herbie Hancock chronology
The New Standard (1995)	1 + 1 (1997)	Gershwin's World (1998)

Wayne Shorter chronology
High Life (1995)	1 + 1 (1997)	Footprints Live! (2002)

Professional ratings
Review scores
Source	Rating
AllMusic	3/5 stars
The Penguin Guide to Jazz Recordings	3/4 stars

1 + 1 is a duet studio album by pianist Herbie Hancock and soprano saxophonist Wayne Shorter.

== Overview ==
Hancock and Shorter perform 10 compositions on the album, including the Grammy Award-winning "Aung San Suu Kyi", named after the Burmese pro-democracy activist of the same name; "Joanna's Theme", which originally was on Hancock's original soundtrack to the film Death Wish; and "Diana", originally recorded for Shorter's album Native Dancer. It is Hancock's forty-first album and Shorter's twenty-first.

== Track listing ==
No.	Title	Writer(s)	Length
1.	"Meridianne – A Wood Sylph"	Shorter	6:09
2.	"Aung San Suu Kyi"	Shorter	5:45
3.	"Sonrisa"	Hancock	6:26
4.	"Memory of Enchantment"	Michiel Borstlap	6:20
5.	"Visitor from Nowhere"	Hancock, Shorter	7:44
6.	"Joanna's Theme"	Hancock	5:22
7.	"Diana"	Shorter	5:32
8.	"Visitor from Somewhere"	Hancock, Shorter	9:04
9.	"Manhattan Lorelei"	Hancock, Shorter	7:22
10.	"Hale-Bopp, Hip-Hop"	Hancock	1:51

== Personnel ==
Musicians

- Herbie Hancock – grand piano
- Wayne Shorter – soprano saxophone

Production

- Herbie Hancock – producer
- Wayne Shorter – producer
- Tomoo Suzuki – recording, mixing
- Dave Hampton – studio technician
- Mitch Robertson – studio technician
- Doug Sax – mastering
- Kathy Lucien – production coordinator, liner notes
- Melinda Murphy – production coordinator
- Camille Tomonaro – production coordinator
- Nate Herr – release coordinator
- Giulio Turturro – art direction, design
- Michael O'Neill – photography
- Theodora Kuslan – liner notes
- Mastered at The Mastering Lab (Hollywood, California).
