= Alegría (Wayne Shorter album) =

Studio album by Wayne Shorter
- Released: February 2003 (Japan)
- Studios: Cello Studios (Hollywood, California); Avatar Studios, Clinton Recording Studios, Sear Sound and Burning Kite Studio (New York City, New York)
- Genre: Jazz
- Length: 57:00
- Label: Verve
- Producer: Robert Sadin

Wayne Shorter chronology
Footprints Live! (2002)	Alegría (2003)	Live at the Montreux Jazz Festival 1988 (2005)

Alegría is a studio album by saxophonist Wayne Shorter, released on Verve Records in 2003. It is the second album to feature the 'Footprints Quartet' of Shorter, pianist Danilo Pérez, bassist John Patitucci and drummer Brian Blade.

The piece "Orbits" is a complete and quasi-orchestral re-imagining of the song of the same name, originally recorded by the Second Miles Davis Quintet and released on the album Miles Smiles in 1967. "Capricorn 2" revisits another Shorter composition first recorded by Davis in 1967 (though not released until 1976 on the primarily Shorter-composed Water Babies), while "Angola" dates from Shorter's own 1965 album, The Soothsayer.

== Reception ==
Professional ratings
Review scores
Source	Rating
AllMusic	4/5 stars
The Penguin Guide to Jazz Recordings	3.5/4 stars

The AllMusic review by Richard S. Ginell stated that "this disc seemed to confirm a long-awaited creative Indian summer for Wayne Shorter." Similarly, contemporaneous reviews by Ben Ratliff of The New York Times and CMJ New Music Report's Tad Hendrickson happily noted Shorter's return to form. Los Angeles Times critic Don Heckman commended both the album's "startling diversity" and the "imaginative, high-flying freedom [that characterizes] Shorter's playing," adding that Alegria offered "convincing testimony to Shorter's undiminished creativity."

In February 2004, Shorter's efforts resulted in two Grammy Awards: Best Jazz Instrumental Album and Best Instrumental Composition (for "Sacajawea").

== Track listing ==
All compositions by Wayne Shorter except where noted.

1. "Sacajawea" – 7:40
2. "Serenata" (Leroy Anderson, Arr. Shorter) – 6:09
3. "Vendiendo Alegría" (Malka Himel, Joso Špralja, Arr. Shorter) – 7:03
4. "Bachianas Brasileiras No. 5" (Heitor Villa-Lobos, Arr. Robert Sadin) – 6:00
5. "Angola" – 5:28
6. "Interlude" – 1:49
7. "She Moves Through the Fair" (Traditional, Arr. Shorter) – 4:39
8. "Orbits" – 6:09
9. "12th Century Carol" (Anonymous, Arr. Shorter) – 6:04
10. "Capricorn 2" – 5:59

== Personnel ==
Footprints Quartet

- Wayne Shorter – soprano saxophone (1, 2, 3, 5, 7, 9), tenor saxophone (1, 4–8, 10), arrangements (2, 3, 5, 7, 8, 9)
- Danilo Pérez – acoustic piano (1, 3, 7, 9, 10)
- John Patitucci – bass (1, 2, 4, 5, 7–10)
- Brian Blade – drums (1, 2, 6, 7, 8, 10)

Note: The 'Footprints Quartet' appear intact on tracks 1, 7 & 10.

Others

- Robert Sadin – conductor (2, 3, 8, 9), arrangements (4)
- Brad Mehldau – acoustic piano (2, 5, 8)
- Terri Lyne Carrington – drums (3, 5, 9)
- Alex Acuña – percussion (3, 4, 5, 9)
- Frank Morelli – bassoon (2, 8)
- Allen Blustine – clarinet (2, 3, 8), bass clarinet (2, 3, 8)
- Chris Potter – bass clarinet (5), tenor saxophone (5)
- Paul Lustig Dunkel – flute (2, 3, 8)
- Stephen Taylor – English horn (2, 8), oboe (2, 8)
- John Clark – French horn (3, 9), alto horn (9)
- Stewart Rose – French horn (3, 9)
- Bruce Eidem – trombone (3, 9)
- Jim Pugh – trombone (3, 5)
- Papo Vázquez – trombone (3)
- Steve Davis – trombone (5)
- Michael Boschen – trombone (9)
- Chris Gekker – trumpet (3, 9)
- Lew Soloff – trumpet (3, 9)
- Jeremy Pelt – trumpet (5)
- Marcus Rojas – tuba (9)
- Charles Curtis – cello (2, 8), cello solo (4)
- David Garrett, Barry Gold, Gloria Lum, Daniel Rothmuller, Brent Samuel and Cecilia Tsan – cello ensemble (4)

== Production ==
- Robert Sadin – producer, mixing
- Richard Seidel – executive producer
- Clark Germain – special production assistance, recording, additional mix engineer
- David Darlington – special production assistance, mixing
- Todd Whitelock – additional mix engineer
- Dick Kondas – mix assistant
- Steve Mazur – mix assistant
- Mike Peters – mix assistant
- Shane Koss – audio technical consultant
- PK Pandey – audio technical consultant
- Mark Wilder – mastering
- Seth Foster – mastering assistant
- Marsha Black – production coordinator
- Camille Tominaro – production coordinator
- Theodora Kuslan – release coordinator
- Kelly Pratt – release coordinator
- Hollis King – art direction
- Sachico Asano – design
- Kate Garner – photography

Studios

- Recorded at Cello Studios (Hollywood, California); Avatar Studios, Clinton Recording Studios, Sear Sound and Burning Kite Studio (New York City, New York).
- Mixed at Sear Sound, Sorcerer Sound and Sony Music Studios (New York City, New York).
- Mastered at Sony Music Studios.
