= Carlos Santana and Wayne Shorter – Live at the Montreux Jazz Festival 1988 =

Live at the Montreux Jazz Festival 1988

Live album by Carlos Santana and Wayne Shorter
- Released: July 2005
- Recorded: July 14, 1988
- Venue: Montreux Jazz Festival
- Genre: Pop, rock, jazz
- Length: 129:02
- Label: Vap (Japan), Image Entertainment
- Producer: Joel Jaffe

Carlos Santana chronology
Santana Brothers (1994)	Live at the Montreux Jazz Festival 1988 (2005)

Wayne Shorter chronology
Alegría (2003)	Live at the Montreux Jazz Festival 1988 (2005)	Beyond the Sound Barrier (2005)

Live at Montreux Jazz Festival is a live album by guitarist Carlos Santana and saxophonist Wayne Shorter that was released in 2005. The album is a record of their performance at the Montreux Jazz Festival on July 14, 1988.

== Background ==
Santana and Shorter played together before, on The Swing of Delight (1980), and on This Is This! (1986), the final album by Weather Report, though Shorter left halfway through recording the album. Two years later he played at the jazz festival in Montreux, Switzerland, with musicians that were mostly from Santana's band: José Areas, Armando Peraza, Leon "Ndugu" Chancler, and keyboardist Chester Thompson. Bass guitarist Alphonso Johnson was from Weather Report. There was also a DVD-Video of the concert.

== Track listing ==
=== Disc one ===
1. "Spiritual" (John Coltrane) – 8:20
2. "Peraza" (Armando Peraza, David Sancious) – 9:20
3. "Shhh" (Patrice Rushen) – 8:27
4. "Incident at Neshabur" (Alberto Gianquinto, Santana) – 4:20
5. "Elegant People" (Shorter) – 4:40
6. "Goodness and Mercy" (Santana, Thompson) – 9:50
7. "Sanctuary" (Shorter) – 4:55

=== Disc two ===
1. "For Those Who Chant" (Luis Gasca) – 5:11
2. "Blues for Salvador" (Santana, Thompson) – 6:46
3. "Fireball 2000" (Rushen) – 8:29
4. "Ballroom in the Sky" (Shorter) – 7:20
5. "Once It's Gotcha" (Santana, Thompson, Johnson, Jeffrey Cohen, Tom Coster) – 8:59
6. "Mandela" (Peraza) – 8:22
7. "Deeper, Dig Deeper" (Santana, Thompson, Buddy Miles, Sterling Crew) – 8:41
8. "Europa (Earth's Cry Heaven's Smile)" (Santana, Coster) – 6:10

=== DVD-Video ===
1. "Peraza"
2. "Shhh"
3. "Incident At Neshabur"
4. "Elegant People"
5. "Percussion Solo"
6. "Goodness & Mercy"
7. "Sanctuary" / "Let The Music Speak"
8. "Blues For Salvador"
9. "Fireball 2000"
10. "Ballroom In The Sky"
11. "Once It's Gotcha"
12. "For Those Who Chant"
13. "Mandela"
14. "Deeper, Dig Deeper"
15. "Europa"
16. "Interview"

== Personnel ==
Musicians

- Carlos Santana – guitar
- Wayne Shorter – saxophone
- Patrice Rushen – keyboards
- Chester D. Thompson – keyboards
- Alphonso Johnson – bass guitar
- Leon "Ndugu" Chancler – drums
- Armando Peraza – congas
- José Chepito Areas – timbales

Production

- Carlos Santana – executive producer
- Joel Jaffe – producer, engineer
- Marc Dimmitt – engineer
- Ken Friedman – photography
- Mark Brady – photography
