= Beyond the Sound Barrier =

Live album by Wayne Shorter
- Released: June 14, 2005
- Recorded: 2002–04
- Venue: Tour in North America, Europe and Asia
- Genre: Jazz
- Length: 61:12
- Label: Verve

Wayne Shorter chronology
Live at the Montreux Jazz Festival 1988 (2005)	Beyond the Sound Barrier (2005)	Without a Net (2013)

Beyond the Sound Barrier is a live album by saxophonist Wayne Shorter, released by Verve Records in 2005. It features Shorter’s "Footprints" Quartet with pianist Danilo Pérez, bassist John Patitucci and drummer Brian Blade.

== Background ==
The album was recorded from November 2002 to April 2004 during the tour in North America, Europe and Asia. Beyond the Sound Barrier received the 2006 Grammy Award for Best Instrumental Jazz Album.

== Reception ==
Professional ratings
Review scores
Source	Rating
All About Jazz	5/5 stars
AllMusic	3.5/5 stars
The Penguin Guide to Jazz Recordings	3/4 stars
PopMatters	9/10 stars

Nate Chinan of Jazz Times wrote that it "picks up where its predecessor left off: It’s another compilation of concert recordings from the band’s extensive travels. But where the epochal Footprints-Live! raided the classic Shorter catalog for material, this album sprinkles in several new tunes. They tend toward a mysterious rippling quality that justifies long and cosmic titles. The best of the bunch is the title track, which spins a seductive ostinato into a vast and mysterious koan."

Will Layman of PopMatters said that it "does more than reinforce the marvel of Wayne Shorter’s return to brilliant, challenging acoustic jazz. This collection of concert recordings makes the argument that Wayne’s long hiatus served an important artistic purpose, and one that the first two comeback discs did not fully acknowledge. On Sound Barrier, Wayne’s quartet ... plays in a fully interactive style that eschews individual 'solos' almost completely. There is not a single track that follows the usual jazz format of melody-solos-melody. Every one of these performances is a thematic exploration resembling a conversation between four equal partners—but a musical conversation of such exquisite cohesion and explosive discovery that each track seems an impossibility of grace."

== Track listing ==
All compositions by Wayne Shorter except where noted.

1. "Smilin' Through" (Arthur A Penn) – 11:52
2. "As Far as the Eye Can See" – 6:27
3. "On Wings of Song" (Felix Mendelssohn) – 4:35
4. "Tinker Bell" – 1:59
5. "Joy Ryder" – 11:19
6. "Over Shadow Hill Way" – 12:33
7. "Adventures Aboard the Golden Mean" – 6:03
8. "Beyond the Sound Barrier" – 6:24

== Personnel ==
Musicians

- Wayne Shorter – saxophones
- Danilo Pérez – piano
- John Patitucci – bass
- Brian Blade – drums

Production

- Wayne Shorter – producer
- Dahlia Ambach Caplin – A&R
- Rob Griffin – engineer (recording, mixing, mastering)
- Vincent Rousseau – engineer (recording, mixing)(tracks 2, 7)
- Mark Wilder – engineer (mastering)
- Maria Triana – assistant engineer (mastering)
- Jeff Ciampa – assistant engineer (mastering)
- Kelly Pratt – release coordinator
- Theodora Kuslan – release coordinator
- Hollis King – art direction
- Rika Ichiki – design
- Henry Leutwyler – photography
