= Joy Ryder =

Studio album by Wayne Shorter
- Released: 1988
- Recorded: 1988
- Studio: Mad Hatter (Los Angeles, CA)
- Genre: Jazz
- Length: 43:47
- Label: Columbia
- Producer: Wayne Shorter

Wayne Shorter chronology
Phantom Navigator (1986)	Joy Ryder (1988)	A Tribute to Miles (1994)

Joy Ryder is the eighteenth album by saxophonist Wayne Shorter, released on Columbia in 1988.

== Reception ==
The AllMusic review by Scott Yanow stated: "Wayne Shorter's occasional Columbia records of the 1980's are all disappointments. His compositions (there are seven on this out-of-print set) lacked the originality and quirkiness of his 1960's work and, although his sound was still very much intact, Shorter's improvisations tend to wander a bit aimlessly. On this album, Shorter (doubling on soprano and tenor) is joined by a basic trio (keyboardist Patrice Rushen, bassist Nathan East and drummer Terri Lyne Carrington) and such guest musicians as keyboardists Herbie Hancock and Geri Allen, bassist Darryl Jones and (on 'Someplace Called Where') vocalist Dianne Reeves."

Professional ratings
Review scores
Source	Rating
AllMusic	2/5 stars
The Philadelphia Inquirer	2/4 stars

== Track listing ==
All compositions by Wayne Shorter

1. "Joy Ryder" – 6:39
2. "Cathay" – 6:25
3. "Over Shadow Hill Way" – 6:03
4. "Anthem" – 4:20
5. "Causeways" – 8:20
6. "Daredevil" – 6:25
7. "Someplace Called 'Where'" – 5:20

== Personnel ==
Musicians

- Wayne Shorter – soprano saxophone, tenor saxophone
- Patrice Rushen – keyboards
- Geri Allen – acoustic piano (tracks 1–3, 5, 7), synthesizers (tracks 1–3, 5, 7)
- Herbie Hancock – synthesizers (tracks 4 & 7)
- Nathan East – bass (tracks 1–3, 5–7)
- Darryl Jones – bass (track 4)
- Terri Lyne Carrington – drums
- Frank Colón – percussion (tracks 2 & 5)
- Dianne Reeves – vocals (track 7)

Production

- Wayne Shorter – producer, back cover painting
- K2 – co-producer, engineer
- Duncan Aldrich – assistant engineer
- Nancy Donald – art direction, design
- Tony Lane – art direction, design
- Victoria Pearson – cover photography
- Judi Siskind – lettering
