= Phantom Navigator =

- Cover art by Jean-Francois Podevin

Studio album by Wayne Shorter
- Released: 1987
- Recorded: 1986
- Studios: Mad Hatter (Los Angeles, CA); The Power Station (New York City, NY)
- Genre: Jazz
- Length: 38:25
- Label: Columbia
- Producer: Wayne Shorter

Wayne Shorter chronology
Atlantis (1985)	Phantom Navigator (1987)	Joy Ryder (1988)

Phantom Navigator is an album by the American jazz saxophonist Wayne Shorter, released on Columbia Records in 1987. Chick Corea played piano on "Mahogany Bird".

== Critical reception ==
Professional ratings
Review scores
Source	Rating
AllMusic	1.5/5 stars
Los Angeles Times	2/5 stars
Windsor Star	C−

The Windsor Star wrote that "the tunes are superficial, the concentration is on soprano sax, generally thin and shrill here, everything buried by batteries of keyboards, vampy electric bass and the thudding monotony of drum machines." The Los Angeles Times determined that "the creative level simply does not reflect Shorter's talents to optimum effect." The Philadelphia Inquirer called the album "bitterly disappointing fluff."

The AllMusic review by Richard S. Ginell stated: "On a sheer technical level, Wayne's soprano and tenor work is alright, yet on 'Yamanja' he does a depressingly mechanical sounding turn on a lyricon. Pass this right by."

== Track listing ==
All compositions by Wayne Shorter.

1. "Condition Red" – 5:08
2. "Mahogany Bird" – 6:10
3. "Remote Control" – 7:55
4. "Yamanja" – 6:28
5. "Forbidden, Plan-It!" – 6:09
6. "Flagships" – 6:35

== Personnel ==
Musicians

- Wayne Shorter – soprano saxophone, tenor saxophone (tracks 1, 3, 5–6), lyricon (4)
- Erik Hansen – synthesizer programming
- Paul Heckert – additional synthesizer programming
- Mitchel Forman – synthesizers (1), acoustic piano (4 & 6), additional keyboards (4 & 6)
- Chick Corea – acoustic piano (2)
- Stu Goldberg – synthesizers (2, 4–6), additional keyboards (3)
- Jim Beard – synthesizers (3, 5)
- Jeff Bova – synthesizers (3)
- Gary Willis – bass guitar (1), electric bass (2)
- John Patitucci – acoustic bass (2), bass guitar (4–5)
- Alphonso Johnson – bass guitar (3)
- Tom Brechtlein – drums (1)
- Jimmy Bralower – drums (3), percussion programming (3)
- Scott Roberts – percussion (2, 4–6), drum programming (4–5)
- Bill Summers – percussion (2, 4–5), drum programming (4–5)
- Ana Maria Shorter – intro vocals (4)
- Gregor Goldberg – vocals (6)

Production

- Wayne Shorter – producer, illustration
- George Butler – executive producer
- K2 – co-producer, engineer, mixing
- Duncan Aldrich – assistant engineer (tracks 1–2, 4–6)
- Gary Duncan – assistant engineer (1–2, 4–6)
- Steve Krause – mix assistant (1–2, 4–6)
- Michael Christopher – assistant engineer (3)
- Bob Ludwig – mastering
- Nancy Donald – art direction
- Tony Lane – art direction
- Jean-Francois Podevin – illustration
