= The Soothsayer =

Studio album by Wayne Shorter
- Released: 1979
- Recorded: March 4, 1965
- Studios: Van Gelder, Englewood Cliffs, New Jersey
- Genre: Post-bop
- Length: 50:21
- Labels: Blue Note; LT 988; CDP 7 84443 2
- Producer: Alfred Lion

Wayne Shorter chronology
Speak No Evil (1965)	The Soothsayer (1979)	Et Cetera (1965)

The Soothsayer is the seventh album by Wayne Shorter, recorded in 1965, but not released on Blue Note until 1979. The album features five originals by Shorter and an arrangement of Jean Sibelius' "Valse Triste". The featured musicians are trumpeter Freddie Hubbard, alto saxophonist James Spaulding, pianist McCoy Tyner, bassist Ron Carter and drummer Tony Williams.

== Critical reception ==
Professional ratings
Review scores
Source	Rating
AllMusic	4.5/5 stars
Tom Hull	B+
The Penguin Guide to Jazz Recordings	3.5/4 stars
The Rolling Stone Jazz Record Guide	3/5 stars
DownBeat	4/5 stars

Reviewing a 1990 reissue, the Chicago Tribune noted that "the result is hard-driving and as edgy as the time at which it was made." The AllMusic review by Stacia Proefrock stated that "it ranks with the best of his works from this incredibly fertile period".

== Track listing ==
Original release (1979)

All compositions by Wayne Shorter except where noted.
A1. "Lost" – 7:12
A2. "Angola" – 4:48
A3. "The Big Push" – 8:18
B1. "The Soothsayer" – 9:35
B2. "Lady Day" – 5:31
B3. "Valse Triste" (Jean Sibelius) – 7:37

Bonus track on CD reissue (1990)

7. "Angola" [alternate take] – 7:35

== Personnel ==
- Wayne Shorter – tenor saxophone
- Freddie Hubbard – trumpet
- James Spaulding – alto saxophone
- McCoy Tyner – piano
- Ron Carter – bass
- Tony Williams – drums
