= Without a Net (Wayne Shorter album) =

Live album by Wayne Shorter
- Released: February 5, 2013
- Recorded: December 8, 2010 and tour in the end of 2011
- Venue: Tour in Europe
- Studio: Walt Disney Concert Hall ("Pegasus" only)
- Genre: Jazz
- Length: 1:17:22
- Label: Blue Note 509999 79516 2 9
- Producer: Wayne Shorter

Wayne Shorter chronology
Beyond the Sound Barrier (2005)	Without a Net (2013)	Emanon (2018)

Without a Net is a live album by American jazz saxophonist Wayne Shorter and his ‘Footprints’ Quartet: pianist Danilo Perez, bassist John Patitucci and drummer Brian Blade. The album was released on February 5, 2013, via Blue Note to critical acclaim.

== Background ==
Without a Net was Shorter's first album for Blue Note Records in 43 years, after Odyssey of Iska (1971). The album contains six original compositions recorded on the quartet's European tour in late 2011, along with a version of "Pegasus", featuring Imani Winds, recorded at the Walt Disney Concert Hall in Los Angeles. "Orbits" is a new version of the composition originally featured on the Miles Davis Quintet's 1967 album Miles Smiles; this version would win a Grammy Award for Best Jazz Instrumental Solo in 2014. In addition to the seven originals, the album also features a rendition of the title song from the 1933 musical film Flying Down to Rio.

== Reception ==
Professional ratings
Aggregate scores
Source	Rating
Metacritic	86/100
Review scores
Source	Rating
All About Jazz	4.5/5 stars
The Arts Desk	5/5 stars
AllMusic	4/5 stars
The Guardian	5/5 stars
Los Angeles Times	3.5/4 stars
Mojo	4/5 stars
musicOMH	5/5 stars
PopMatters	8/10
Sputnikmusic	4/5

Will Layman of PopMatters wrote "Wayne Shorter and his quartet are not just a good or great jazz group, they are a single voice of one of the best American musicians we’ve had in the last 50 years. This is a musician who is far from in his valedictory years. Wayne Shorter seems, only now, to be saying all that he has had to say. And Without a Net ought to get a superb listening. It’s the shape of where jazz has been and where it is today."

Chris Barton of the Los Angeles Times called the album "a sprawling, relentlessly inventive listen that nods toward Shorter’s rich legacy as a true musical giant, even while pointing toward an undeniable truth that, even at 80 years old, he isn’t finished exploring yet."

Rob Shepherd of PostGenre noted, "While the performances by the saxophonist and his long-standing quartet ... are extraordinary, it is really the compositions which come to the fore. Throughout, they reconstruct an eclectic complication of songs ranging from new tunes to longstanding originals including those once played with Miles’ Second Great Quintet or Weather Report. Like with the rest of Shorter's scores, even the oldest of these is made to sound not just new and contemporary but, at times, futuristic."

== Track listing ==
No.	Title	Writer(s)	Length
1.	"Orbits"	Shorter	4:50
2.	"Starry Night"	Shorter	8:49
3.	"S.S. Golden Mean"	Shorter	5:18
4.	"Plaza Real"	Shorter	6:59
5.	"Myrrh"	Shorter	3:05
6.	"Pegasus"	Shorter	23:08
7.	"Flying Down to Rio"	Edward Eliscu, Gus Kahn, Vincent Youmans	12:47
8.	"Zero Gravity to the 10th Power"	Blade, Patitucci, Pérez, Shorter	8:13
9.	"(The Notes) Unidentified Flying Objects"	Blade, Patitucci, Pérez, Shorter	4:13
Total length:			1:17:22

== Personnel ==
Wayne Shorter Quartet

- Wayne Shorter – tenor and soprano saxophones
- John Patitucci – double bass
- Brian Blade – drums
- Danilo Perez – piano

Imani Winds

- Mariam Adam – clarinet on "Pegasus"
- Valerie Coleman – flute on "Pegasus"
- Monica Ellis – bassoon on "Pegasus"
- Jeff Scott – French horn on "Pegasus"
- Toyin Spellman-Diaz – oboe on "Pegasus"

Production

- Wayne Shorter – producer, illustration
- Scott Southard – executive producer
- Don Was – A&R
- Steve Cook – A&R administration
- Gabriel Fonseca – assistant engineer (recording)
- Rob Griffin – engineer (mixing)
- Jeff Ciampa – assistant engineer (mixing)
- Mark Wilder – engineer (mastering)
- Tom Korkidis – production coordinator
- Gordon H Jee – creative director, design
- Robert Ascroft – photography
