= JuJu (album) =

Studio album by Wayne Shorter
- Released: July 1965
- Recorded: August 3, 1964
- Studio: Van Gelder Studio, Englewood Cliffs, New Jersey
- Genre: Post-bop, modal jazz, hard bop
- Length: 42:07
- Label: Blue Note; BLP 4182; CP32-5250
- Producer: Alfred Lion

Wayne Shorter chronology
Night Dreamer (1964)	JuJu (1965)	Speak No Evil (1966)

JuJu is the fifth album by American jazz saxophonist Wayne Shorter. It was released in July 1965 by Blue Note Records. It features a rhythm section of pianist McCoy Tyner, bassist Reggie Workman and drummer Elvin Jones, all of whom had worked extensively with Shorter's fellow tenor saxophonist John Coltrane.

== Critical reception ==
Professional ratings
Review scores
Source	Rating
AllMusic	5/5 stars
DownBeat	3/5 stars
The Penguin Guide to Jazz Recordings	3.5/4 stars
The Rolling Stone Jazz Record Guide	4/5 stars

Writing a retrospective review in AllMusic, Stacia Proefrock avers that the use of Coltrane's rhythm section "bolstered" criticism that Shorter was "a mere acolyte of John Coltrane". Proefrock goes on to say that "The truth is, though, that Elvin Jones, Reggie Workman, and McCoy Tyner were the perfect musicians to back Shorter." Proefrock concludes that the album "blooms with ideas, pulling in a world of influences and releasing them again as a series of stunning, complete visions."

== Track listing ==
Original release (1965)

All compositions by Wayne Shorter.

A1. "JuJu" – 8:30
A2. "Deluge" – 6:49
A3. "House of Jade" – 6:49
B1. "Mahjong" – 7:39
B2. "Yes or No" – 6:34
B3. "Twelve More Bars to Go" – 5:26

Bonus tracks on remastered CD release (1996)

7. "Juju" [alternate take] – 7:47
8. "House of Jade" [alternate take] – 6:35

== Personnel ==
- Wayne Shorter – tenor saxophone
- McCoy Tyner – piano
- Reggie Workman – bass
- Elvin Jones – drums
