= Danilo Pérez =

Panamanian pianist, composer and educator

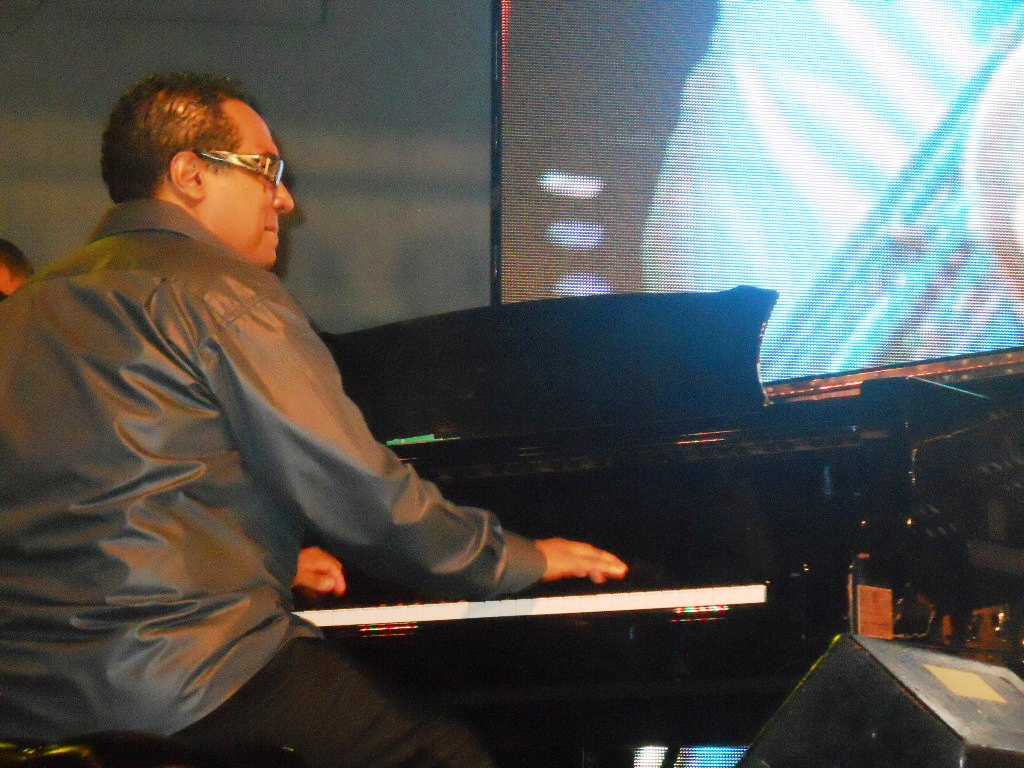
- Pérez in 2012

Background information
- Born: December 29, 1965 (age 60); Panama
- Genres: Jazz, Latin jazz
- Occupations: Musician, composer
- Instrument: Piano
- Years active: 1989–present
- Labels: Novus, Impulse!, GRP, Verve, ArtistShare, Concord, EmArcy, Mack Avenue
- Website: www.daniloperez.com

Danilo Pérez (born December 29, 1965) is a Panamanian pianist, composer, educator, and a social activist.

His music is a blend of Panamanian roots with elements of Latin American folk music, jazz, European impressionism, African, and other musical heritages that promote music as a multi-dimensional bridge between people. He has released eleven albums as a leader, and appeared on many recordings as a side man, which have earned him critical acclaim, numerous accolades, Grammy Award wins and nominations. He is a recipient of the United States Artists Fellowship, and the 2009 Smithsonian Legacy Award.

== Biography ==
=== Early life ===
Born in Panama in 1965, Danilo Pérez started his musical studies at the age of three with his father, Danilo Enrico Pérez Urriola, an elementary and middle school educator and well known Panamanian singer. In 1967, his father wrote a university thesis in which he stated that the entire curriculum should be taught through music. He used these techniques to teach his son mathematics, science and other subjects through music, therefore rhythm and interconnective learning became the foundation of Pérez's youth. Pérez started on piano when he was three years od. By the age of 10, Pérez was studying the European classical piano repertoire at the National Conservatory in Panama. By the age of 12, he was working professionally as a musician.

In 1985, Pérez was awarded a Fulbright Scholarship to study in the United States. After initially enrolling at Indiana University of Pennsylvania, Pérez quickly transferred to the Berklee College of Music in Boston after being awarded the Quincy Jones Scholarship. While still a student, he performed with Jon Hendricks, Terence Blanchard, Slide Hampton, Claudio Roditi and Paquito D'Rivera. Pérez received a degree in jazz composition and upon graduation he began touring and recording with artists such as Jack DeJohnette, Steve Lacy, Lee Konitz, Charlie Haden, Michael Brecker, Joe Lovano, Tito Puente, Wynton Marsalis, Tom Harrell, Gary Burton, and Roy Haynes.

=== 1989–1992 in Gillespie's United Nation Orchestra ===
In 1989, two events occurred that have proven of lasting influence on both Pérez's creative practice as well as his thinking regarding music as a tool for social change. That year Pérez became the youngest member appointed to Dizzy Gillespie's United Nation Orchestra. Pérez learned from his experience that "One of the things Dizzy taught me was to learn about my own heritage even more than I knew already. He said it was more important for jazz for you to get to what your own roots are, than to learn about other things." Pérez later recalled Gillespie saying: "I want to make music that can create a culture of passport, so that through it, all of humanity can come together." Pérez reflected,

He really showed me the power of music as a diplomatic tool, the power of music in intercultural dialogue,

He really showed me that jazz really questions and allows that it is a duty for us to bring our own culture — where we come from.

I remember one time playing a solo, and I'm very proud of playing a bebop solo in the right language, and everybody is complimenting me. And Dizzy said: "That's good, but you can bring some Panama folklore into it also!"

And I never forget that.

The orchestra's 1990 album Live at the Royal Festival Hall won a Grammy Award. Pérez remained a member of the orchestra until Gillespie's passing in 1992.

The other event was when he returned to his native Panama to perform for the first time with his own ensemble made up of musicians from the United States and Spain: "I went to Panama in 1989 and right after I arrived, the U.S. invasion happened. I performed the concert anyway (I thought, if I die, I prefer to die playing). That day, people for and against the invasion came together to listen to music. That's the power of music."

=== Subsequent career ===
In 1993, Pérez turned his focus to his own work as a bandleader and composer and has gone on to release eleven albums as a leader. Pérez released his first album, Danilo Perez, on the Novus label.

In 1994, at the age of 27, Pérez released what is considered his most personal album, The Journey, a musical account of the torturous trip enslaved Africans made across the oceans in the hulls of the slave ships. The album made it to the top ten jazz lists of New York's Village Voice, the New York Times, Billboard, and the Boston Globe. It also allowed Pérez to become a recognizable name in the jazz community. Critics have hailed The Journey, Pérez's second recording, for its quality of composition and incorporation of Pan-African influences into a jazz context. Pérez set up the album as a dream series tracing the route of slaves, stolen or sold from their homes and transported across the sea. The Journey begins with "The Capture", makes its way through "The Taking", "Chains", "The Voyage", and finishes with "Libre Spiritus". According to Minstrel Music Network, "On The Journey, Pérez ... seeks to blur the distinctions between musical styles, through his all-encompassing vision, and (by implication) to eradicate the distinctions between those people native to the Americas, and the Africans and Europeans who mixed with them to cast the alloy of multiculturalism." Pérez was also in three tracks on the Arturo Sandoval Grammy-winning 1994 album Danzón (Dance On).

In 1995, Pérez was appointed to the faculty of the New England Conservatory. Pérez received his first commission in 1995 from the Concorso Internazionale di Composizione. He immediately began applying the concepts he had been working on in the jazz setting of merging the multiple musical languages and the cultural traditions they represent to large scale compositions. The resulting Pan-American Suite double concerto for vibraphone and piano with orchestra combined the musical traditions of Panamanian folk music and western classical forms and was premiered by Gary Burton and Pérez as soloists.

In the year 1996, he released PanaMonk, a tribute to Thelonious Monk which DownBeat named "One of the most important jazz piano albums in the history". He also performed at the 1996 Summer Olympics in Atlanta with Wynton Marsalis. Pérez also performed as a special guest at President Bill Clinton's Inaugural Ball. He also played the piano on the Bill Cosby TV show theme song.

In 1998, his album Central Avenue, placed mejoranera music (a style of Panamanian folklore singing) within a contemporary jazz context and earned Grammy and Latin Grammy nominations. Both albums received the Boston Music Awards and was chosen as one of the 10 best recordings across genres by Time magazine in 1998.

A subsequent commission from the Chicago Jazz Festival in 1999 for the saxophonist Steve Lacy, Suite for the Americas incorporated American and Latin American folk music with the traditional elements of jazz and was scored for jazz quartet and the American folk instruments of blues guitarist John Primer with the Latin folk singer Luciana Souza and bata drums. Pérez later recorded the piece for his 2000 release Motherland. That same year, he received the first of two commissions from Lincoln Center.

In 2000, he joined Wayne Shorter's "Footprints Quartet" with John Patitucci and Brian Blade. Pérez appeared on all four of the recordings the group made. The quartet received the Jazz Journalists Association award for Small Ensemble of the Year six times between 2002 and 2015. The quartet's first release, Footprints Live! (2002), received the "Album of the Year Award" in 2003 from the Jazz Journalist Association and the DownBeat Critics and Readers polls. The quartet's second release, Alegría (2003), won the Grammy Award for Best Jazz Instrumental Album. The quartet's third release, Beyond the Sound Barrier (2005), received a Grammy award for Best Jazz Instrumental Performance Individual or Group. The quartet's final release, Without a Net (2013), received "Album of the Year" from the Jazz Journalists Association, the DownBeat and NPR Jazz Critics polls. The performance techniques of the quartet have formed the basis of new pedagogy for the study of the relationship between improvisation and composition and is the subject of numerous research studies in jazz. Regarding Shorter, Pérez says, "Wayne viewed his music as the story of his life. And when you listen to Wayne’s music, you’re going to see that you see all those pieces he wrote as sentences, or titles to tell that story."

In 2003, Pérez founded Panama Jazz Festival with the stated mission of bettering the lives of people through shared musical experiences as listeners, on stage and in the classrooms. About the festival, Pérez states: "By offering performances and educational activities of the highest order, as well as practical, hands on training in the music business, the Panama Jazz Festival aims to inspire and educate while providing tools and opportunities to build a better future for individuals and their communities." As such, while the festival annually offers a rich program of concerts by leading international jazz musicians, the emphasis is on music education. It has become the largest music education event in the region and includes classical programs as well as the Latin American Symposium on Music Therapy and an annual symposium on AfroPanamanian traditions. The festival also supports the year-round educational programs of Danilo Pérez Foundation, which brings art and music to children living in communities of extreme poverty throughout the Republic of Panama.

In 2008, Berklee College of Music approached Pérez with the opportunity to design a curriculum that could serve as a platform for his work as an artist and humanitarian that could be taught to generations of gifted musicians for years to come. In 2009 he was named the founder and artistic director for the Berklee Global Jazz Institute; a creative music institute with a progressive vision to develop the artist of the new millennium. About the Institute Pérez states, "the practice of sharing humanity through performance experience is the core of the curriculum and I work with gifted musicians to become leaders in the world community to affect positive social change with one common goal: to develop the creative cultural Ambassadors of the new millennium.

In 2008, the album Across the Crystal Sea, a collaboration between Pérez and the prolific composer and arranger Claus Ogerman, was released, praised by The Guardian as "So ultra-smooth it achieves something like a state of grace". Claus Ogerman said "This is a record I wanted to make before I leave the planet".

In 2010, Pérez released Providencia, which was also nominated for a Grammy Award in the category of "Best Instrumental Jazz Album". Regarding Pérez's 2014 release Panama 500, Harvard Professor David Carrasco remarked "Danilo's musical vision says 'Presente' to the musical tones, timbres, lips and dedos who discovered what only this year we learn while listening to Panama 500, the truth that what we think of as modest, little Panamá, IS also the center of the world,' our becoming world of music, human dialogue, human possibility and pleasure."

Pérez has received commissions from many chamber groups and his work often finds inspiration in the people, journeys and events that shaped the origins of the Americas. In 2011, the Imani Winds commissioned Pérez as part of their legacy commissioning for his composition Travesias Panameñas. In 2012, Pérez was commissioned by Carnegie Hall to compose an octet for members of the Simón Bolívar Symphony Orchestra of Venezuela. Pérez describes the work, Cuentos del Mar, as, "a brushstroke of the oceanic museum of life-the place where we see ourselves depicted, hopeful or mistaken. It is a story of ambition and colonization, a new world that is full of hope and ready to change the course of humanity.

Another commission in 2013 by the Banff Center for his piece Camino de Cruces, written for the Cecilia Quartet. A three-movement crossover work for piano and string quartet. About this work Pérez states, "Camino de Cruces tries to create a personal journey that captures the different challenges the Spaniards, native Indians, and slaves may have faced during their journey from the Atlantic to the Pacific during colonization. At the base of the piece is folkloric counterpoint: native Indian, African, and European cultures blending their influences to create a hybrid form in order to represent Panama as a melting pot". Pérez continues: "This piece is based on my concept called three-dimensional music that combines jazz, Pan-American folklore, and classical music. It has melodic references to traditional Panamanian folklore mixed with North American blues and improvisations, fused with harmonic language from my background in classical music and jazz."

On February 23, 2014, Pérez's dream of bringing a world-class jazz club to Panama became realized with the opening of Danilo's Jazz Club in Panama City's Casco Viejo historic district. Live jazz was suspended during the COVID-19 pandemic. As of 2024, the venue is simply called "The Club" and has tango and salsa bands in addition to jazz.

In 2015, Pérez was commissioned by the Museum of Biodiversity in Panama designed by architect Frank Gehry to compose a site specific work. For this occasion Pérez developed a tridimensional music concept where three different musical stories could be heard individually and/or together depending on where the listener stood in the gallery. The four-part composition was intended as a soundtrack for one of the museum's permanent exhibitions The Human Path, with each movement of the work corresponding to one of four key eras: the beginning of man, the development of the native culture, colonization, and modernity.

In 2015, Pérez premiered two brand new commissions. In July, his composition "Expeditions- Panamania 2015" was performed at the Panamerican games in Toronto. The same year in September, he also premiered his "Detroit World Suite- La leyenda de Bayano at the Detroit Jazz Festival. Some of Pérez's accomplishments include The Legacy Award from the Smithsonian Latino Center, the ASICOM International Award from the University of Oviedo and the Gloria Career Achievement Award from the International Latino Cultural Center of Chicago are among the significant acknowledgements he has received for his work. Pérez previously served as Goodwill Ambassador to UNICEF and currently serves as an UNESCO Artist for Peace and as Cultural Ambassador to the Republic of Panama. In 2016 Pérez received an honorary doctorate from the University of Panama. Pérez's work continues to receive recognition all around the world and in 2017 the Puerto Rico Heineken Jazz Festival dedicated its edition in honor and the work of Panamanian pianist Danilo Pérez. In 2018 Danilo Pérez won the United States Artists Fellowship and the Victoriano Lorenzo Award.

=== Recording as a leader ===
In 1992, he released his first solo album, Danilo Pérez, and then his second, The Journey, in 1994. He performed The Journey in concert with the Panamanian Symphony Orchestra the same year. The album is a musical account of the trip enslaved Africans made across the ocean, beginning with "The Capture", through "The Taking", "Chains", The Voyage", and ending with "Libre Spiritus". David Sanchez and Giovanni Hidalgo play on the album, which was recorded in two days at the Power Station in New York City. The album made it to the top ten jazz lists in The Village Voice, The New York Times, The Boston Globe, and Billboard magazine. It was named one of the best albums of the 1990s by DownBeat magazine.

In 1998, Central Avenue, Pérez's fourth album, received a Grammy nomination for Best Latin Jazz Album. Central Avenue is a blend of influences from blues, folk, and Caribbean and Middle Eastern genres. It was produced by Tommy LiPuma, who worked with Pérez on PanaMonk. Pérez arranged the ensemble of bassists John Patitucci and John Benitez, and drummer Jeff "Tain" Watts. The songs were done in one take, except for "Panama Blues". For this song, Pérez recorded Raul Vital, a Panamanian folk singer, and a chorus of mejorana singers in Panama, then returned with the recording to New York City, where the ensemble contributed. Mejorana is an improvisational style of singing. Pérez told Graybow of Billboard, "[I heard] the blues in their voices, much like the blues down in Mississippi", and instantly wanted to record them.

In 2015, Pérez recorded Children of the Light, which is also the name of the trio of Pérez with bassist John Patitucci and drummer Brian Blade, all rhythm section members of Wayne Shorter's "Footprints Quartet".

For the 2026 Grammy Awards, Pérez received a nomination for the album Lumen in the Best Large Jazz Ensemble Album category.

== Awards ==
Year	Award	Organization/institution
1998	Best Artist/ Band in Performance	New York Jazz Awards
1998	Grammy Nomination for Best Latin Jazz Performance: Central Avenue	41st Annual Grammy Awards
1999	Outstanding Album (Central Avenue)	Boston Music Awards
2000	Distinguished Alumnus Awards	Berklee College of Music
2000	Outstanding Album (Motherland)	Boston Music Awards
2000	Nomination for Best Latin Jazz Album: Motherland	43rd Annual Grammy Awards
2002	Small Ensemble of the Year (Wayne Shorter Quartet)	Jazz Journalists Association
2003	Acoustic Jazz Group of the Year (Wayne Shorter Quartet).	DownBeat 51st Annual Critics Poll
2005	Best Jazz Instrumental Album, Individual Or Group: Beyond The Sound Barrier. Wayne Shorter Quartet	48th Annual Grammy Awards
2008	Special Recognition for Musical Contribution to the Latino Community	Hispanic Yellow Pages
2009	Legacy Award	Smithsonian Latino Center
2010	ASICOM Latin American Award	University of Oviedo
2010	Best Jazz Instrumental Album, Individual Or Group. Providencia	53rd Annual Grammy Awards
2012	UNESCO Artist for Peace	UNESCO
2013	Small Ensemble of the Year (Wayne Shorter Quartet)	Jazz Journalists Association
2014	Mid- Sized Band of the Year (Wayne Shorter Quartet)	Jazz Journalists Association
2015	2015 Gloria Career Achievement Award	The International Latino Cultural Center of Chicago
2015	Cultural Ambassadors of the Republic of Panama	The Panamanian Government, through the Ministry of Foreign Affairs
2015	Mid- Sized Band of the Year (Wayne Shorter Quartet)	Jazz Journalists Association
2015	Career Achievement Award	International Latino Cultural Center of Chicago
2004 - 2006	Goodwill Ambassador	UNICEF
2016	Music Pioneers Award	Afro- Latino Festival NYC
2016	Honorary doctorate	University of Panama
2017	Excellence in the Arts Award	Panamanian Institute of Art (Panarte)
2018	Victoriano Lorenzo Award	Presented by Rafael Pino-Pinto, governor of the province of Panama
2018	United States Artists' 2018 Fellowship Award	United States Artists
2019	Best Jazz Instrumental Album (Emanon). Wayne Shorter Quartet.	61st Annual Grammy Awards
2021	Best Jazz Vocal Album: Secrets Are The Best Stories. Kurt Elling and Danilo Pérez	63rd Annual Grammy Awards (2020)
2021	Doris Duke Performing Artist	Doris Duke Performing Artist Award

== Commissioned work ==
Year	Title	Organization
1995	Panamerican Suite	Concorso Internazionale di Composizione
1999	Suite for the Americas	Chicago Jazz Festival
2002	Freedom of Colors	Lincoln Center
2008	Panama Suite	Chicago Department of Cultural Affairs, Millenium Park and the Jazz Institute of Chicago
2011	Travesias Panameñas	Imani Winds
2012	Cuentos del Mar	Carnegie Hall
2013	Camino de Cruces	Cecilia String Quartet. Banff Center
2015	The Human Path	Biomuseo (Museum of Biodiversity - Panama)
2015	Expeditions—Panamania 2015	TORONTO 2015 Pan Am and Parapan Am Games arts and culture festival, Panamania, CIBC, Toronto Summer Music Festival and Lula Music and Arts Centre
2015	Detroit World Suite—La Leyenda de Bayano	Detroit International Jazz Festival

== Discography ==
=== As a leader ===
Danilo Pérez plays piano on all albums
Year	Title	Record label	Personnel
1993	Danilo Pérez	RCA/ Novus	Ruben Blades (Vocals), Joe Lovano (Tenor and Soprano Sax), David Sanchez (Tenor and Soprano Sax), Santi Debriano (Bass) and Jack DeJohnette (Drums).
1994	The Journey	Novus	George Garzone (Tenor Sax), David Sanchez (Soprano and Tenor Sax), Larry Grenadier (Bass), Ignacio Berroa (Drums) and Milton Cardona (Bata, Bells, Chant, Shekere)
1996	PanaMonk	Impulse!/GRP	Avishai Cohen (Bass), Terri Lyne Carrington (Drums) and Jeff "Tain" Watts (Drums)
1998	Central Avenue	GRP	Raul Vital (Vocals), John Patitucci or John Benitez (Bass), and Jeff "Tain" Watts (Drums)
2000	Motherland	Verve/PolyGram/Universal	Luciana Souza (Vocals), Claudia Acuna (Vocals), Regina Carter (Violin), Chris Potter (Sax), Diego Urcola (Trumpet), Carlos Henriquez (Acoustic bass), John Patitucci (Acoustic Bass), Richard Bona (Lead Vocal and Electric Bass), Kurt Rosenwinkel (Electric guitar), Aquiles Baez (Cuatro, Acoustic guitar), Brian Blade (Drums), Antonio Sanchez (Drums), Greg Askew (Bata itotele and Response Chant), Louis Bauzo (Bata iya and Lead Chant), Richard Byrd ( Bata Konkolo and Response Chant), Luisito Quintero (Congas), and Ricaurte Villarreal (Tambor Repicador)
2003	...Till Then	Universal/Verve	Lizz Wright (Vocals), Donny McCaslin (Soprano Sax), John Patitucci (Bass), Ben Street (Bass), Brian Blade (Drums) and Adam Cruz (Drums, steel pan, percussion)
2005	Live at the Jazz Showcase	ArtistShare	Ben Street (Bass) and Adam Cruz (Drums)
2006	Panama Suite	ArtistShare	Vocals: Natalia Bernal, Eleonora Bianchini, Mitzi Dorbu, Patricia Zarate and Paola Vergara. Reeds: Soprano Sax - Daniel Blake, Also Sax - Luis "El Chupa" Rosa and Patricia Zarate. Tenor Sax- Sean Berry, Sean Best, Petr Cancura. Baritone Sax- Michael Duke. Trumpet- Gordon Au, Gilberto Cervantes, Danny Fratina and John Replogle. Trombone- Daniel Blacksberg, Jason Camelio, Jeff Galindo and Angel Subero. Piano- Gabriel Guerrero. Electric Bass- Aldemar Valentín. Drums- Francisco Molina. Percussion- Ernesto Diaz and Paulo Stagnaro
2008	Across the Crystal Sea	Concord/EmArcy	Cassandra Wilson (Vocals), Christian McBride (Bass), Lewis Nash (Drums), Luis Quintero (Percussion), Claus Ogerman (Conductor, orchestra arranger).
2010	Providencia	Mack Avenue	Sara Serpa (Vocals) Rudresh Mahanthappa (Alto Sax); Ben Street (Bass), Adam Cruz (Drums and steel pans), Jamey Haddad (Percussion), Ernesto Diaz (Congas), Matt Marvuglio (Flute) Barbara Laffitte (Oboe), Amparo Edo Biol (French horn), Margaret Phillips (Bassoon) Jose Benito Meza Torres (Clarinet)
2014	Panama 500	Mack Avenue	Alex Hargreaves (Violin), Sachi Patitucci (Cello), John Patitucci (Electric and Acoustic Bass), Ben Street (Bass), Brian Blade (Drums), Adam Cruz (Drums, Roman Diaz (Percussion and Chant), Rogerio Boccato (Percussion), Milagros Blades (Repicador, Caja and Pujador) and Ricaurte Villarreal (Caja and Guiro), José Angel Colman (Vocals), Eulogio Olaideginia Benítez (Gala, Bissu), José Antonio Hayans (Gammuburwi), Marden Paniza (Director and coordinator of guna musicians, author of the narration)
2015	Children of the Light	Mack Avenue	John Patitucci (Bass) and Brian Blade (Drums)

=== As sideman ===
Year released	Leader	Title	Label	Personnel
1989	Dizzy Gillespie	Live at the Royal Festival Hall	Enja	Flora Purim – vocals, Dizzy Gillespie - Trumpet; Claudio Roditi – Trumpet, percussion; Arturo Sandoval – Trumpet, Flugelhorn, Piccolo; Slide Hampton – Trombone; Steve Turre – Trombone, Bass Trombone, Shells; Paquito D'Rivera – Alto saxophone, Clarinet, Percussion; James Moody – Alto Saxophone, Tenor Saxophone, Flute, Percussion; Mario Rivera – Tenor Saxophone, Soprano Saxophone, Percussion; John Lee – Bass Guitar; Ed Cherry – Guitar; Danilo Pérez – Piano; Ignacio Berroa – Drums, Percussion; Airto Moreira – Percussion, Drums; Giovanni Hidalgo – Percussion, Congas.
1989	Paquito D'Rivera	Tico! Tico!	Chesky Records	Paquito D'Rivera - Clarinet, Alto and Tenor Saxophones; David Fink- Bass; Mark Walker- Drums; Nilson Matta - Bass, Portinho: drums; Danilo Pérez -Piano; Raphael Cruz- Percussion; Fareed Haque - Guitar; Romero Lubambo - Guitar: Tibero Nascimento- Guitar.
1989	Paquito D'Rivera	Return To Ipanema	Town Crier Recordings	Paquito D'Rivera - Alto Saxophone, Clarinet; Ralph Moore- Tenor Saxophone; Claudio Roditi - Trumpet; Jay Ashby - Trombone; Danilo Pérez - Piano; Nilson Matta - Bass; Portinho- Percussion; Rafael Cruz - Percussion.
1989	Claudio Roditi	Slow Fire	Milestone Records	Claudio Roditi, Trumpet, Flugelhorn, Vocals, Percussion, Piano; Ralph Moore, Tenor Saxophone; Jay Ashby- Trombone; Danilo Pérez, Piano; David Finck- Bass; Daniel Freiberg- Synthesizer; Akira Tanas, Ignacio Berroa - Drums, Percussion; Rafael Cruz, Thiago De Mello- Percussion
1990	Dizzy Gillespie	The Winter in Lisbon	Milan	Dizzy Gillespie - Trumpet; Leola Jiles - Vocals; Mario Rivera - flute, soprano saxophone; Richard Spencer - Viola; Bob Carlisle - French horn; Sandra Billingslea - Violin; Akua Dixon - Cello; Danilo Pérez - piano; George Mraz - bass; Grady Tate - Drums.
1990	Tom Harrell	Form	Contemporary Records	Tom Harrel- Trumpet, Flugelhorn; Joe Lovano - Tenor Saxophone; Cheryl Pyle - Flute; Danilo Pérez - Piano; Charlie Haden - Bass; Paul Motian - Drums.
1991	Ricky Ford	Hot Brass	Candid	Ricky Ford - Tenor Saxophone, Alto Saxophone; Lew Soloff and Claudio Roditi – Trumpet; Steve Turre – Trombone; Danilo Pérez – Piano; Christian McBride – Bass; Carl Allen – Drums.
1991	Arturo Sandoval	Flight to Freedom	GRP Records	
1991	Kenny Rankin	Because of You	Chesky Records	
1992	Dizzy Gillespie	To Bird with Love	Telarc	Dizzy Gillespie - Trumpet; Bobby McFerrin - Vocals; Antonio Hart, Paquito D'Rivera, Jackie McLean - Alto saxophone; Benny Golson, Clifford Jordan, David Sánchez - Tenor saxophone; Danilo Pérez - piano; George Mraz - Bass; Kenny Washington, Lewis Nash - Drums.
1992	Dizzy Gillespie	Bird Songs: The Final Recordings	Telarc	Dizzy Gillespie – Trumpet; Bobby McFerrin – Vocals; Antonio Hart, Paquito D'Rivera, Jackie McLean – Alto saxophone; Benny Golson, Clifford Jordan, David Sánchez – Tenor Saxophone; Danilo Pérez – Piano; George Mraz – Bass; Kenny Washington, Lewis Nash – Drums
1992	Paquito D'Rivera	Who's Smoking?!	Candid	Paquito D'Rivera- Alto Saxophone, Soprano Saxophone - Clarinet; Mark Morganelli - Flugelhorn; James Moody - Tenor Saxophone; Claudio Roditi - Trumpet, Flugelhorn; Danilo Pérez, Pedrito López - Piano; Hervie Swartz - Bass; Al Foster - Drums.
1992	Tom Harrell	Passages	Chesky Records	Tom Harrell - Trumpet, Flugelhorn; Cheryl Pyle- Flute; Joe Lovano - Tenor Saxophone, Alto Saxophone, Soprano Saxophone; Danilo Pérez - Piano; Peter Washington- Bass; Paul Motian - Drums
1992	Dave Samuels	Del Sol	GRP Records	Dave Samuels - Marimba, Percussion, Synthesizer, Vibe Master, Vibraphone; Dave Valentin - Flute; Jorge Strunz - Guitar; Danilo Pérez, Javier Carizzo - Piano; Lincoln Goines, Eliseo Borrero - Bass; Walfredo Reyes, Richie Goines, Richie Morales - Drums; Andy Narell - Steel Drums; Juanito Oliva, Sammy Figueroa, Long John Oliva - Percussion.
1993	Slide Hampton	Dedicated To Diz	Telarc Jazz Zone / Telarc	
1993	Ray Drummond	Excursion	Arabesque	Ray Drummond –Double Bass; Craig Handy, Joe Lovano – Saxophone, Flute; Danilo Pérez – Piano; Marvin "Smitty" Smith, Mor Thiam - Drums, Percussion.
1993	Bobby Watson	Tailor Made	Columbia	Bobby Watson- Soprano and Alto Sax; Bobby Porcelli- Flute; Bobby Porcelli - Alto Sax; Patience Higgins - Clarinet; Bill Saxton, Craig Bailey, Ed Jackson, Jim Hartog, Rich Rothenberg - Saxophone; Patience Higgins - Tenor Saxophone; Tom Varne - French Horn; Jon Faddis, Melton Mustafa, Ryan Kisor, Terell Stafford- Trumpet; Doug Purviance, Frank Lacy, Robin Eubanks, Steve Turre - Trombon; Bob Stewart - Tuba; Danilo Pérez, Eddie Martinez, James Williams, Stephen Scott - Piano; Essiet Essiet - Bass; Paul Socolow - Electric Bass; Steve Berrios, Victor Lewis - Drums; Ray Mantilla - Congas; Victor See-Yuen - Percussion
1994	Jeanie Bryson	Tonight I need you So	Telarc Distribution / Telarc	
1994	David Sanchez	The Departure	Columbia	David Sánchez - Soprano Saxophone, Tenor Saxophone; Tom Harrell- Trumpet; Danilo Pérez - Piano; Andy Gonzalez, Peter Washington - Bass; Leon Parker - Drums; Milton Cardona - Percussion.
1996	David Sanchez	Street Scenes	Columbia	David Sánchez - Soprano Saxophone, Tenor Saxophone, Claves, Rainstick; Cassandra Wilson - Vocals; Kenny Garrett- Alto Saxophone; Danilo Pérez - Piano; Charnett Moffett, John Benitez, Larry Grenadier - Bass; John Benitez - Clave; Clarence Penn, Horacio "El Negro" Hernandez; Milton Cardona- Drums, Shekere.
1996	Conrad Herwig	Latin Side of John Coltrane	Astor Place	Conrad Herwig - Trombone; Dave Valentin - Alto (Vocals), Flute, Flute (Alto), Flute (Bass); Gary Smulyan, Gary Smulyan - Baritone Sax; Brian Lynch, Mike Ponella, Alex Sipiagin, Ray Vega - Trumpet; Danilo Pérez, Eddie Palmieri, Edward Simon, Richie Beirach - Piano; Andy González, John Benítez - Bass; Adam Cruz - Drums; Milton Cardona - Batá Drums, Chant, Congas, Percussion, Vocals; José "Cochi" Claussell - Bongos, Chant, Percussion, Timbales; Richie Flores - Chant, Congas.
1997	T.S. Monk	Monk on Monk	N-Coded Music / N2K Records	
1998	Tom Harrell	The Art of Rhythm	RCA	Tom Harrell- Flugelhorn, Trumpet; Greg Tardy - Clarinet; Gary Smulyan - Bass Clarinet, Alto Saxophone; David Sanchez, Dewey Redman - Tenor Saxophone; Ken McIntyre - Bassoon; Regina Carter - Violin; Ron Lawrence - Viola; Akua Dixon - Cello; Danilo Pérez - Harmonium, Piano; Romero Lubambo, Mike Stern- Guitar; Andy González, Ugonna Okegwo - Bass; Yoron Israel, Duduka Da Fonseca, Leon Parker - Drums; Adam Cruz - Cowbell; Valtinho Anastacio -Congas, Percussion; Milton Cardona- Congas; Bryan Carrott - Marimba; Natalie Cushman - Claves, Shakuhachi.
1998	Gerardo Nuñez	Calima	Alula Records	Gerardo Nuñez - Guitar; Danilo Pérez- Piano; John Patitucci - Bass; Tuncboyaciyan and Carmen Cortés- Percussion.
1998	Avishai Cohen	Adama	Concord / Stretch Records	Avishai Cohen- Bass; Claudia Acuña - Vocals; Steve Davis - Trombone; Amos Hoffman - Oud; Chick Corea - Fender Rhodes; Danilo Pérez - Piano; Brad Mehldau - Piano; Jeff Ballard - Drums; Jordy Rossi - Drums; Don Alias - Congas
2000	John Patitucci	Imprint	Concord Jazz	John Patitucci- Bass, Kalimba; Chris Potter, Mark Turner - Tenor Saxophone; Danilo Pérez, John Beasley - Piano; Jack DeJohnette, Horacio "El Negro" Hernande- Drums, Percussion; Giovanni Hidalgo- Congas, Percussion
2000	Roy Haynes	The Roy Haynes Trio	Verve	Roy Haynes - Drums; Danilo Pérez - Piano; John Patitucci- Bass.
2001	Gary Burton	For Hamp, Red, Bags, and Cal	Concord Jazz	Gary Burton - Marimba, Vibraphone, Xylophone; Christian McBride, John Patitucci- Bass; Danilo Pérez, Makoto Ozone, Mulgrew Miller - Piano; Russell Malone - Guitar; Horacio Hernandez, Lewis Nash - Drums; Luis Quintero- Percussion
2001	Wayne Shorter	Footprints Live!	Verve	Wayne Shorter - Tenor and Soprano Saxophone; Danilo Pérez - Piano; John Patitucci - Bass; Brian Blade - Drums.
2003	Wayne Shorter	Alegría	Verve	Wayne Shorter- Tenor and Soprano Saxophone; Danilo Pérez - Piano; John Patitucci - Bass; Brian Blade - Drums.
2003	Lizz Wright	Salt	Verve	Lizz Wright - Vocals; Alto Saxophone; Chris Potter - Soprano saxophone; Myron Walden - Bass Clarinet; Derrick Gardner - Trumpet; Vincent Gardner - Trombone; Sarah Adams - Viola, Ronald Carbone, Crystal Garner - Viola; Ellen Westerman, Joe Kimura, Caryl Paisner, Mark Orrin Shuman - Cello; Kenneth Banks — Piano, Hammond organ, Fender Rhodes; Jon Cowherd — Piano, Fender Rhodes; Danilo Pérez - Piano; Sam Yahel — Hammond organ; Adam Rogers - Scoustic Guitar, Electric Guitar, Bottleneck Guitar; Monte Croft — Marimba, Vibraphone; Doug Weiss - Bass, Brian Blade - Acoustic Guitar, Drums; Terreon Gully - Drums; Jeff Haynes - Percussion
2005	Wayne Shorter	Beyond the Sound Barrier	Verve	Wayne Shorter- Tenor and Soprano Saxophone; Danilo Pérez - Piano; John Patitucci - Bass; Brian Blade - Drums.
2005	Paquito D'rivera & Arturo Sandoval	Reunion	DiscMedi Blau	Paquito D'Rivera - Saxophone [Alto], Clarinet; Arturo Sandoval - Trumpet, Flugelhorn; Danilo Pérez - Piano; Fareed Haque - Guitar; David Finck - Bass; Mark Walker - Drums, Percussion; Giovanni Hidalgo - Percussion, Bongos.
2008	David Sanchez	Cultural Survival	Concord Picante	David Sanchez - Tenor Saxophone, Vocals, Percussion; Lage Lund - Guitar; Danilo Pérez - Piano; Robert Rodriguez - Keyboards [Fender Rhodes]; Ben Street, Hans Glawischnig - Bass; Adam Cruz, Henry Cole - Drums; Pernell Saturnino - Percussion.
2009	Jack DeJohnette	Music We Are	Golden Beams / Kindred Rhythm	Jack DeJohnette – Drums, Melodica; John Patitucci – Bass; Danilo Pérez – Piano, Keyboard.
2009	Terri Lyne Carrington	More to Say...Real Life Story	eOne Music	Terri Lyne Carrington - Drums, Keyboards, Vocals, Producer; Vocals – Chris Walker, Jtronius, Kudisan Kai, Les McCann, Lori Perry, Nancy Wilson, Niki Haris, Dorian Inez-Carrington (Intro Vocals); Godwin Louis - Flute, Soprano Saxophon; Everette Harp, Walter Beasley - Alto Saxophone; Kirk Whalum, Sonny Carrington, Walter Smith - Soprano Saxophone, Tenor Saxophone; Ambrose Akinmusire, Voro Garcia - Trumpet; Gregoire Maret - Harmonica; Maestro1ton - MC, Rap, Vocals, DJ Mix; Chuck Loeb, Tim Miller, A. Ray Fuller, Dwight Sills, Julian Lage, Randy Runyon, David Fiuczynski, Anthony Wilson - Guitar; Maeve Gilchrist - Harp; Keyboards – Alain Mallet, Alaine Mallet, Cédric Hanriot, Greg Phillinganes, Jetro da Silva, Mitchel Forman, Lawrence Fields; Danilo Pérez - Piano; Patrice Rushen - Piano, Electric Piano [Fender Rhodes]; George Duke - Piano, Keyboards; Christian McBride, Freddie Washington, Hogyu Hwang, Jimmy Haslip, Lenny Stallworth, Matthew Garrison, Richard Patterson - Bass; Percussion – Dan Pugach, Eugie Castrillo*, Joe Galeota, Mohammed Kalifa Kamara, Munyungo Jackson.
2012	Wynton Marsalis	Swinging into the 21st	Sony Legacy	Wynton Marsalis - Trumpet, Conductor; Cassandra Wilson - Vocals, Sequina DuBose - Soprano (Vocal), Kevin McAllister - Baritone (Vocal), Kay Bowen - Vocals, Elliott Jackson - Baritone (Vocal), Shirley Caesar - Vocals, Valerie Williams - Vocals, Bobette Jamison-Harrison - Vocals, Kenneithia Redden-Mitchell - Soprano (Vocal), Miriam Richardson - Mezzo-Soprano (Vocal), Issachah Savage - Tenor (Vocal), Kenneth Alston- Soloist, Tenor (Vocal), Byron J. Smith - Choir Conductor; Wessell Anderson - Clarinet, Sax (Alto), Sax (Sopranino); Walter Blanding - Sax (Tenor) Walter Blanding Jr - Clarinet, Sax (Alto), Sax (Soprano), Sax (Tenor); Andrew Farber - Clarinet, Sax (Alto); Gideon Feldstein - Clarinet, Clarinet (Bass), Sax (Baritone); Victor Goines - Clarinet, Clarinet (Bass), Primary Artist, Sax (Alto), Sax (Soprano), Sax (Tenor), Sherman Irby - Clarinet, Sax (Alto); Sam Karam - Clarinet; Ted Nash - Clarinet, Clarinet (Bass), Flute, Piccolo, Alto and Soprano Sax; Joe Temperley - Clarinet (Bass), Sax (Baritone), Sax (Soprano); Todd Williams - Clarinet, Soprano and Tenor Sax; Seneca Black, Bob Findley, Oscar Brashear, Russell Gunn, Roger Ingram, Ryan Kisor, Riley Mullins, Marcus Printup, Jamil Sharif - Trumpet; Delfeayo Marsalis, Vincent Gardner, Lucien Barbarin, Wayne Goodman, David Taylor, Bob Trowers, Ron Westray - Trombone; Reginald Veal - Bass Trombone; Norman Pearson - Tuba; Karen Briggs, Ida Kavafian, Todd Phillips, Daniel Phillips, Mark O'Connor - Mandolin - Violin, Steve Tenenbom - Viola; Timothy Eddy - Cello; Chamber Music Society of Lincoln Center; Russell Malone - Guitar; Don Vappie, Doug Wamble- Banjo, Guitar; Danilo Pérez, Marcus Roberts, Harry Connick Jr, Cyrus Chestnut, Peter Martin, Eric Reed, Farid Barron -Piano; Carlito Henriquez, Edgar Meyer, Rodney Whitaker, Ben Wolfe - Bass; Jason Marsalis, Herlin Riley, Jaz Sawyer - Drums; Stefon Harris - Assistant Conductor, Bass Marimba, Drums (Snare), Marimba, Percussion, Vibraphone; Kimati Dinizulu - Percussion, Washboard; Pernell Saturnino - Congas, Latin Percussion.
2013	Wayne Shorter	Without a Net	Blue Note	Wayne Shorter- Tenor and Soprano Saxophone; Danilo Pérez - Piano; John Patitucci - Bass; Brian Blade - Drums.
2018	Wayne Shorter	Emanon	Blue Note	Wayne Shorter- Tenor and Soprano Saxophone; Danilo Pérez - Piano; John Patitucci - Bass; Brian Blade - Drums.
