= High Life (Wayne Shorter album) =

Studio album by Wayne Shorter
- Released: October 17, 1995
- Genre: Jazz fusion, world music
- Length: 53:10
- Label: Verve
- Producer: Marcus Miller

Wayne Shorter chronology
A Tribute to Miles (1994)	High Life (1995)	1+1 (1997)

Professional ratings
Review scores
Source	Rating
AllMusic	4/5 stars
The Penguin Guide to Jazz Recordings	3/4 stars

High Life is an album by jazz saxophonist Wayne Shorter, released on Verve Records in 1995. It won the Grammy Award in 1996 for Best Contemporary Jazz Performance. Some of the musicians include keyboardist Rachel Z, guitarist David Gilmore, bassist Marcus Miller, percussionists Lenny Castro and Airto and drummer Will Calhoun of Living Colour.

== Overview ==
The album was the first album Wayne Shorter had recorded as a leader for seven years. It was also his recording debut for Verve Records. High Life was something of a departure from the jazz-fusion albums that Shorter had recorded in the late 1980s after leaving Weather Report. The compositions were generally seen to be more complex than his previous efforts and the use of synthesized instruments was seen to be more subtle.

Shorter wrote, composed, and arranged all of the compositions featured on it. A thirty-piece orchestral ensemble was used in addition to the electronic instruments. The album was produced by Marcus Miller, who also played electric bass and conducted the orchestra. Keyboardist Rachel Z contributed to the orchestration and the sound design of the album as well as played piano and synths. Besides soprano and tenor saxophone it is the first and only (recorded) occasion Shorter played alto and baritone saxophones.

The album was (mainly) recorded and mixed in Bill Schnee's studio in North Hollywood, and released on October 17, 1995. High Life won the Best Contemporary Jazz Performance in 1996.

== Track listing ==
1. "Children of the Night" – 7:23
2. "At the Fair" – 7:29
3. "Maya" – 5:12
4. "On the Milky Way Express" – 5:35
5. "Pandora Awakened" – 6:20
6. "Virgo Rising" – 6:46
7. "High Life" – 6:28
8. "Midnight in Carlotta's Hair" – 5:54
9. "Black Swan (In Memory of Susan Portlynn Romeo)" – 2:04

All compositions by Wayne Shorter

== Personnel ==
- Wayne Shorter – alto saxophone, baritone saxophone, soprano saxophone, tenor saxophone
- Rachel Z – pianos, synthesizers, sequencing, sound design
- David Gilmore – guitars
- Marcus Miller – bass guitar, rhythm programming, bass clarinet
- Will Calhoun – drums
- Terri Lyne Carrington – drums (track 8)
- Lenny Castro – percussion
- Airto Moreira – percussion
- Munyungo Jackson – percussion (track 8)
- Kevin Ricard – percussion (track 8)
- David Ward – additional sound design

Orchestra

- Wayne Shorter – orchestrations and arrangements
- Marcus Miller – conductor
- Suzie Katayama – contractor
- Sarah Bonebrake, Stephen Cartotto, Jim Cowger, Michelle Dalton, Ronald Goldstein, Janice Hayen and Frank Macchia – music copyists
- Horns and Woodwinds
  - Gary Bovyer and Lorin Leeve – bass clarinet
  - Ronald Jannelli – bassoon
  - Emily Bernstein and Ralph Williams – clarinet
  - Julie Feves and Michele Grego – contrabassoon
  - Annarenee Grizell, Kazue McGregor and Sara Weisz – flute
  - Joyce Kelley-Clark – oboe
  - Linda Muggeridge and Leslie Reed – English horn
  - Daniel Kelley, Joe Meyer and Brad Warnaar – French horn
  - Steven Holtman and Robert Payne – trombone
  - Jon Lewis and Rob McGregor – trumpet
- Strings
  - Larry Corbett – cello
  - Robert Becker, Denyse Buffum, Ralph Fielding, Harry Shirinian and Evan Wilson – viola
  - Bruce Dukov, Armen Garabedian, Suzie Katayama, Edith Markman, Sid Page and Michele Richards – violin

Production

- Marcus Miller – producer
- John Hendrickson – recording
- Will Alexander – additional recording
- Ray Blair – additional recording
- Peter Doell – additional recording
- Leslie Ann Jones – additional recording
- Brian Schueble – additional recording
- David Ward – additional recording, production assistant
- Koji Egawa – assistant engineer
- Steve Genewick – assistant engineer
- Sean Schimmel – assistant engineer
- Brian Young – assistant engineer
- Bill Schnee – mixing
- Doug Sax – mastering
- Bibi Green – production coordinator
- Nate Herr – release coordinator
- Rudi Mallasch – release coordination assistant
- Erica Gebhardt – logistics coordinator
- David Lau – art direction, design
- Chris Cuffaro – photography
- Ana Maria Shorter – wardrobe
- Lynne Bugai – stylist
- M'Jai Jefferson – grooming
- Trish Gossett – make-up

Studios

- Recorded and Mixed at Schnee Studios (Hollywood, California).
- Additional recording at Capitol Studios (Hollywood, California); Pacifique Studios (North Hollywood, California); Milky Way Technics (Los Angeles, California).
- Mastered at The Mastering Lab (Hollywood, California).
