= Footprints Live! =

footprints live!

Live album by Wayne Shorter
- Released: 2002
- Recorded: July 14, 20 and 24, 2001
- Venue: Festival de Jazz de Vitoria-Gasteiz; Jardins Palais Longchamps (Marseille, France); Umbria Jazz Festival (Perugia, Italy)
- Genre: Jazz
- Length: 63:29
- Label: Verve
- Producer: Wayne Shorter

Wayne Shorter chronology
| 1+1 (1997) | footprints live! (2002) | Alegría (2003) |

Footprints live! is a live album by saxophonist Wayne Shorter, released on Verve Records in 2002. It was Shorter's first official live album released under his own name and the first album to feature his 'Footprints Quartet' with pianist Danilo Perez, bassist John Patitucci and drummer Brian Blade.

== Reception ==
The AllMusic review by Robert L. Doerschuk stated, "They're even playful; try to catch that 'Rock-A-Bye Baby' quote from Shorter in the title track."

Professional ratings
Review scores
| Source | Rating |
|---|---|
| AllMusic | 3/5 stars |
| The Penguin Guide to Jazz Recordings | 3/4 stars |

== Track listing ==
All compositions by Wayne Shorter except as indicated

1. "Sanctuary" - 5:31
2. "Masqualero" - 8:28
3. "Valse Triste" - 7:59 (Jean Sibelius, arr. by Shorter)
4. "Go" - 5:01
5. "Aung San Suu Kyi" - 9:28
6. "Footprints" - 7:55
7. "Atlantis" - 8:28
8. "JuJu" - 10:39

Tracks 1, 2 and 6: Live at the Festival de Jazz de Vitoria-Gasteiz in Spain, July 20, 2001,

3, 4, 5 and 7: Live at the Jardins Palais Longchamps in Marseille, France, July 24, 2001,

8: Live at the Umbria Jazz Festival in Perugia, Italy, July 14, 2001

== Personnel ==
Footprints Quartet

- Wayne Shorter – tenor saxophone (1–4, 6–8), soprano saxophone (5, 6, 8)
- Danilo Perez – grand piano
- John Patitucci – bass
- Brian Blade – drums

Production

- Wayne Shorter – producer
- Richard Seidel – executive producer
- Rob Griffin – recording, mixing
- Julie Strickler – recording assistant
- Jeff Ciampa – assistant engineer
- Mark Wilder – mastering at Sony Music Studios (New York, NY)
- Theodora Kuslan – release coordinator
- Kelly Pratt – release coordinator
- Hollis King – art direction
- Sachico Asano – design
- Kate Garner – photography
- Ronnie White – photography
