= Wayne Shorter =

American jazz saxophonist and composer (1933–2023)

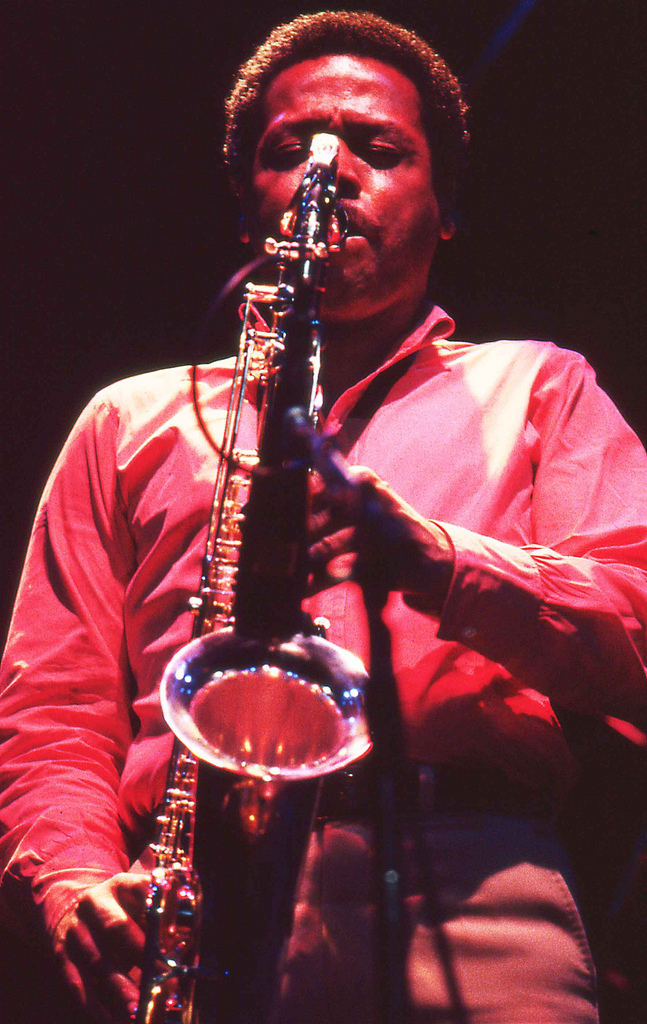
- Shorter performing in Amsterdam, 1980

Background information
- Born: August 25, 1933; Newark, New Jersey, U.S.
- Died: March 2, 2023 (aged 89) Los Angeles, California, U.S.
- Education: New York University
- Genres: Jazz; fusion; modal jazz; post-bop; avant-garde jazz
- Occupations: Musician; composer
- Instruments: Tenor saxophone; soprano saxophone; whistler
- Years active: 1958–2021
- Labels: Blue Note; Columbia; Verve
- Formerly of: Art Blakey and the Jazz Messengers; Miles Davis' Second Great Quintet; The Manhattan Project; Weather Report
- Website: wayneshorter.com (archived)

Wayne Shorter (August 25, 1933 – March 2, 2023) was an American jazz saxophonist, composer, and bandleader, widely regarded as one of the most important and influential figures in the history of jazz. Over a career spanning more than six decades, he received 12 Grammy Awards and the Polar Music Prize, and was acclaimed worldwide for his originality, compositional depth, and transformative approach to musical improvisation.

Shorter first rose to mainstream prominence in 1959 after joining Art Blakey's Jazz Messengers, where he quickly became the ensemble's primary composer and one of its defining creative voices. In 1964, he joined Miles Davis's Second Great Quintet, contributing compositions and performances that helped shape one of the most innovative and influential periods in jazz history. In 1970, he co-founded the jazz fusion band Weather Report, which achieved international success and redefined the possibilities of electric jazz.

As a bandleader, Shorter recorded more than 20 albums, and many of his compositions—including works written for Davis, Weather Report, and his own groups—became enduring jazz standards. His music is noted for its harmonic sophistication, narrative structure, and philosophical depth, earning sustained critical praise and influence across generations of musicians.

Shorter was especially acclaimed for his mastery of the soprano saxophone, having shifted his primary focus from the tenor in the late 1960s. Beginning in 1970, he dominated DownBeat magazine's annual critics' and readers' polls on soprano saxophone, winning the critics' poll for 10 consecutive years and the readers' poll for 18.

In 2008, The New York Times music critic Ben Ratliff described Shorter as "probably jazz's greatest living small-group composer and a contender for greatest living improviser," a characterization that reflected his towering status within the genre.

== Early life and education ==
Wayne Shorter was born in Newark, New Jersey, the son of Louise and Joseph Shorter. He graduated from Newark Arts High School in 1952. Encouraged by his parents, Shorter began taking clarinet lessons at age 16 and later switched to tenor saxophone. While in high school, Wayne performed with the Nat Phipps Band in Newark. His older brother Alan played alto saxophone before switching to the trumpet in college.

Shorter enrolled at New York University in 1952 and graduated with a degree in music education in 1956. After graduating, Shorter spent two years in the U.S. Army, during which time he played briefly with Horace Silver. After his discharge, he played with Maynard Ferguson.

While growing up, Shorter loved comic books and science fiction as well as music. In his youth, Shorter acquired the nickname "Mr. Gone", which later became an album title for Weather Report.

== Career ==
His early influences include Sonny Rollins, John Coltrane and Coleman Hawkins. In 1959, Shorter joined Art Blakey's Jazz Messengers where he stayed for four years, eventually becoming musical director and composing pieces for the band. Together they toured the US, Japan, and Europe, recording several albums. During this time, Shorter "established himself as one of the most gifted of the young saxophonists", and received international acknowledgment.

=== With Miles Davis (1964–70) ===
Herbie Hancock said of Shorter's tenure in Miles Davis's Second Great Quintet: "The master writer to me, in that group, was Wayne Shorter. He still is a master. Wayne was one of the few people who brought music to Miles that didn't get changed." Davis said, "Wayne is a real composer. He writes scores, writes the parts for everybody, just as he wants them to sound. ... Wayne also brought in a kind of curiosity about working with musical rules. If they didn't work, then he broke them, but with musical sense; he understood that freedom in music was the ability to know the rules, in order to bend them to your own satisfaction and taste."

Ian Carr, musician and Rough Guide author, said that with Davis, Shorter found his own voice as a player and composer. "Blakey's hard-driving, straight-ahead rhythms had brought out the muscularity in Shorter's tenor playing, but the greater freedom of the Davis rhythm-section allowed him to explore new emotional and technical dimensions."

Shorter remained in Davis's band after the breakup of the quintet in 1968, playing on early jazz fusion recordings including In a Silent Way and Bitches Brew (both 1969). His last live dates and studio recordings with Davis were in 1970.

Until 1968, he played tenor saxophone exclusively. The final album on which he played tenor in the regular sequence of Davis albums was Filles de Kilimanjaro. In 1969, he played the soprano saxophone on the Davis album In a Silent Way and on his own Super Nova (recorded with then-current Davis sidemen Chick Corea and John McLaughlin). When performing live with Davis, and on recordings from summer 1969 to early spring 1970, he played both soprano and tenor saxophones: by the early 1970s, however, he chiefly played soprano.

==== Solo Blue Note recordings ====
Simultaneous with his time in the Davis quintet, Shorter recorded several albums for Blue Note Records, featuring, almost exclusively, his own compositions, with a variety of line-ups, quartets and larger groups, including Blue Note favorites such as trumpeter Freddie Hubbard. His first Blue Note album (of 11 in total recorded from 1964 to 1970) was Night Dreamer, recorded at Rudy Van Gelder's studio in 1964 with Lee Morgan (trumpet), McCoy Tyner (piano), Reggie Workman (bass) and Elvin Jones (drums). Two more albums were recorded in 1964, JuJu and Speak No Evil.

Of the three Blue Note albums Shorter recorded in 1965, The All Seeing Eye (rec. 1965, rel. 1966) was a workout with a larger group, while Adam's Apple (rec. 1966, rel. 1967) was back to carefully constructed melodies by Shorter leading a quartet. Then a sextet again in the following year for Schizophrenia (rec. 1967, rel. 1969) with Herbie Hancock, bassist Ron Carter, trombonist Curtis Fuller, alto saxophonist/flautist James Spaulding and strong rhythms by drummer Joe Chambers.

Shorter also recorded occasionally as a sideman (again mainly for Blue Note) with trumpeter Donald Byrd, McCoy Tyner, trombonist Grachan Moncur III, Freddie Hubbard, Lee Morgan, as well as bandmates Herbie Hancock and drummer Tony Williams.

=== Weather Report (1971–1986) ===
Following the release of Odyssey of Iska in 1970, Shorter formed the fusion group Weather Report with Davis veteran keyboardist Joe Zawinul and bassist Miroslav Vitouš. The other original members were percussionist Airto Moreira, and drummer Alphonse Mouzon. After Vitouš's departure in 1973, Shorter and Zawinul co-led the group until the band's break-up in late 1985. A variety of musicians would make up Weather Report over the years (most notably the revolutionary bassist Jaco Pastorius and drummers Peter Erskine and Omar Hakim) helping the band produce many high quality recordings in diverse styles, with funk, bebop, Latin jazz, ethnic music, and futurism being the most prevalent denominators.

==== Solo and side projects ====
Shorter also recorded critically acclaimed albums as a bandleader, notably 1974's Native Dancer, which featured Hancock and Brazilian composer and vocalist Milton Nascimento.

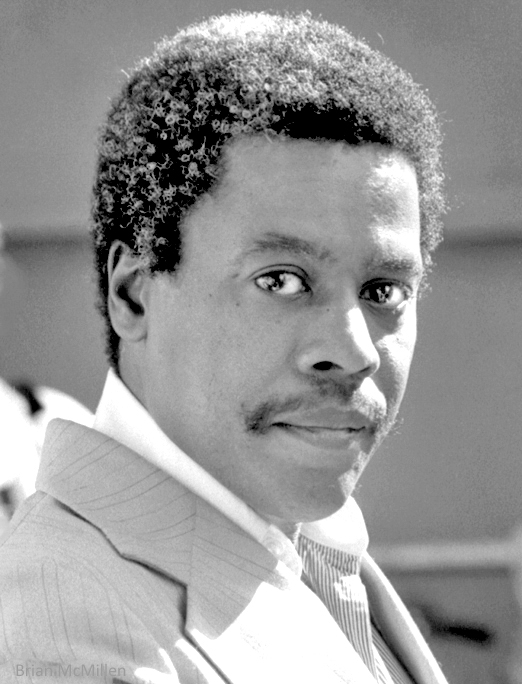
Shorter at the UC Berkeley Jazz Festival, May 25, 1980

In the late 1970s and the early 1980s, he toured in the V.S.O.P. quintet. This group was a revival of the 1960s Davis quintet, except that Freddie Hubbard filled the trumpet chair. Shorter appeared with the same former Davis bandmates on the Carlos Santana double LP The Swing of Delight (1980), for which he also composed a number of pieces.

From 1977 through 2002, he appeared on 10 Joni Mitchell studio albums, gaining him a wider audience. He played an extended solo on the title track of Steely Dan's 1977 album Aja.

=== Later career ===
After leaving Weather Report in 1986, Shorter continued to record and lead groups in jazz fusion styles, including touring in 1988 with guitarist Carlos Santana, who appeared on This is This! (1986), the last Weather Report disc. There is a concert video recorded at the Lugano Jazz Festival in 1987, with Jim Beard (keyboards), Carl James (bass), Terri Lyne Carrington (drums), and Marilyn Mazur (percussion). In 1989, he contributed to a hit on the rock charts, playing the soprano saxophone solo on Don Henley's song "The End of the Innocence" and also produced the album Pilar by the Portuguese singer-songwriter Pilar Homem de Melo. He also maintained an occasional working relationship with Herbie Hancock, including a tribute album recorded shortly after Miles Davis's death with Herbie Hancock, Ron Carter, Tony Williams and Wallace Roney. He continued to appear on Mitchell's records in the 1990s, and can be heard on the soundtrack of the Harrison Ford film The Fugitive (1993).

In 1995, Shorter released the album High Life, his first solo recording for seven years. It was also his debut as a leader for Verve Records. Shorter composed all the compositions on the album and co-produced it with the bassist Marcus Miller with pianist, synthesist, and sound designer Rachel Z. High Life received the Grammy Award for Best Contemporary Jazz Album in 1996.

Shorter worked with Herbie Hancock once again in 1997, on the much acclaimed and heralded album 1+1. The song "Aung San Suu Kyi" (named for the Burmese pro-democracy activist) won both Hancock and Shorter a Grammy Award.

In 2009, he was announced as one of the headline acts at the Gnaoua World Music Festival in Essaouira, Morocco. His 2013 live album Without a Net (rec. 2010) is his first with Blue Note Records since Odyssey of Iska (rec. 1970, rel. 1971).

==== Quartet ====
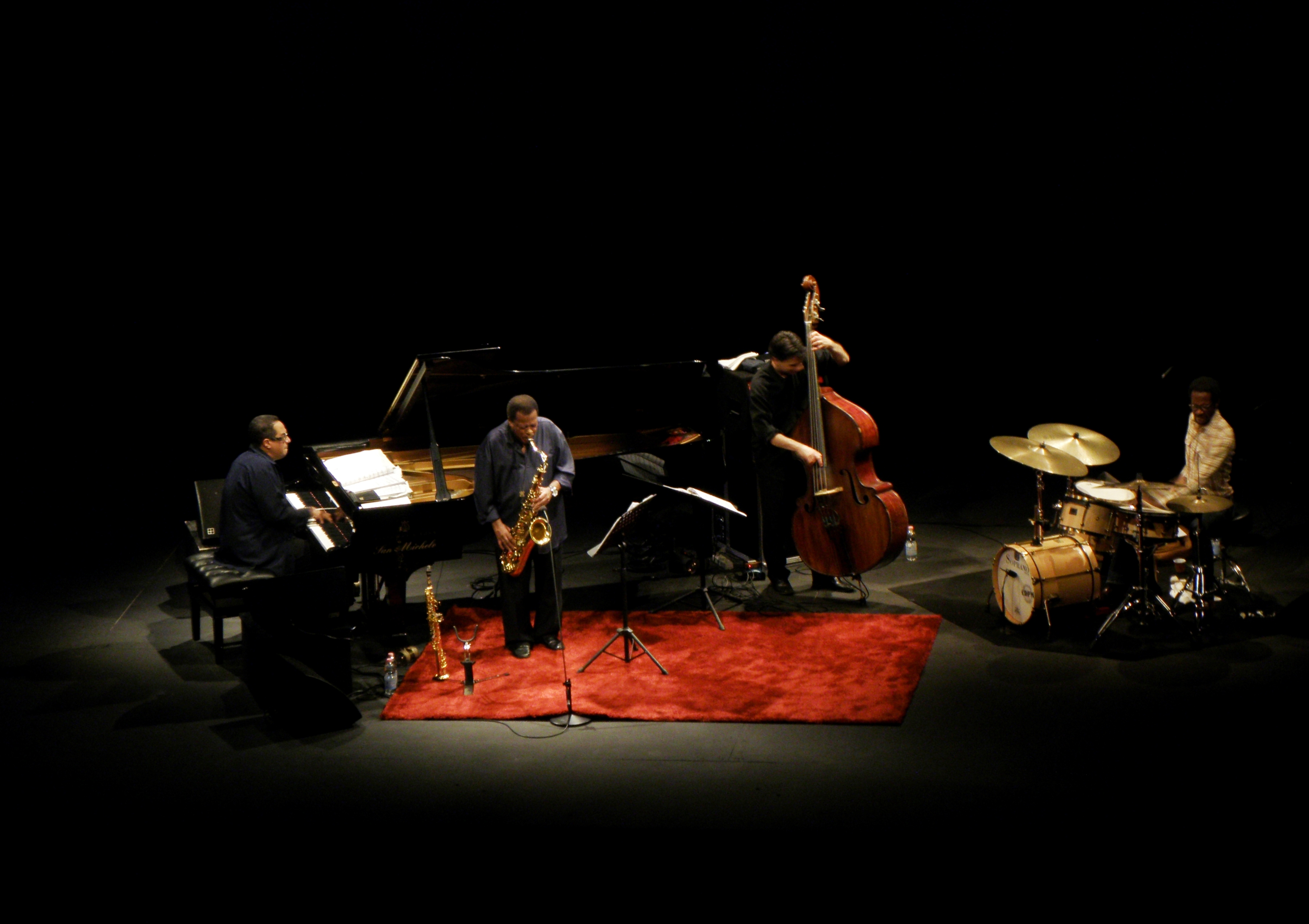
The Wayne Shorter Quartet at the Teatro degli Arcimboldi, Milan, 2010

In 2000, Shorter formed the first permanent acoustic group under his name, a quartet with pianist Danilo Perez, bassist John Patitucci, and drummer Brian Blade, playing his own compositions, many of them reworkings of tunes going back to the 1960s. Four albums of live recordings have been released: Footprints Live! (rec. live 2001, rel. 2002); Beyond the Sound Barrier (rec. live 2002–2004, rel. 2005); Without a Net (rec. live 2010, rel. 2013); and Emanon (2018), with the latter, in addition to live material, including Shorter's quartet in a studio session with the 34-piece Orpheus Chamber Orchestra. The quartet has received great acclaim from fans and critics, especially for the strength of Shorter's tenor saxophone playing. The biography Footprints: The Life and Work of Wayne Shorter by journalist Michelle Mercer examines the working life of the musicians as well as Shorter's thoughts and Buddhist beliefs. Beyond the Sound Barrier received the 2006 Grammy Award for Best Jazz Instrumental Album.

Shorter's 2003 album Alegría (his first studio album for 10 years, since High Life) received the 2004 Grammy Award for Best Jazz Instrumental Album; it features the quartet with a host of other musicians, including pianist Brad Mehldau, drummer Terri Lyne Carrington and former Weather Report percussionist Alex Acuña. Shorter's compositions, some new, some reworked from his Miles Davis period, feature the complex Latin rhythms that he specialized in during his Weather Report days.

==== Wayne Shorter: Zero Gravity ====
In 2015, producer/director Dorsay Alavi began filming a documentary about the life of Shorter called Wayne Shorter: Zero Gravity. A number of high-profile musicians, including Herbie Hancock, Esperanza Spalding, and Terri Lyne Carrington, performed at a donor event to raise funds for the documentary; two of the largest donations came from the Herb Alpert Foundation and Carlos Santana. In 2018, a four-hour preliminary cut was completed. Subsequently, Brad Pitt, Dede Gardner and Jeremy Kleiner joined as producers through Plan B Entertainment. After some delay, partly due to the COVID-19 pandemic, from August 2023, the documentary is available as a three-hour miniseries on Amazon Prime Video.

==== Mega Nova ====
In 2016, it was announced that Shorter, Carlos Santana, and Herbie Hancock would begin touring under the name Mega Nova. Also included within the supergroup was bassist Marcus Miller and drummer Cindy Blackman Santana. Their first show together was on August 24, 2016, at the Hollywood Bowl.

==== Iphigenia ====
In 2018, Shorter retired from his near 70-year performing career due to health issues. He continued working as a composer, creating a "new operatic work" titled Iphigenia, a loose adaptation of the ancient Greek myth; with Esperanza Spalding writing the libretto and architect Frank Gehry designing the sets, which premiered on November 12, 2021, at the Cutler Majestic Theatre.

== Personal life ==
In 1961, Shorter met Teruko Nakagami, a Japanese woman. They married and had a daughter, Miyako. Some of his compositions are copyrighted as "Miyako Music" and Shorter dedicated the pieces "Miyako" and "Infant Eyes" to his daughter. The couple separated in 1964.

Shorter met Ana Maria Patricio in 1966 and they married in 1970. In 1986, their daughter Iska died of a grand mal seizure at age 14. Ana Maria and the couple's niece, Dalila, were killed in the explosion of TWA Flight 800, off the coast of Long Island on July 17, 1996 while traveling to visit Shorter in Italy. Dalila was the daughter of Ana Maria Shorter's sister and her husband, jazz vocalist Jon Lucien.

In 1999, Shorter married Carolina Dos Santos, a close friend of Ana Maria.

Composer and producer Rick Shorter (1934–2017) was Shorter's cousin.

Shorter practiced Nichiren Buddhism for more than 50 years as a longtime member of the Buddhist association Soka Gakkai International.

Singer and actress Tina Turner credits Shorter with saving her life. In Turner's 2020 spiritual memoir Happiness Becomes You, she states that Shorter and Ana Maria gave her critical refuge at their home for six months in 1976 after Turner left her abusive husband, Ike Turner.

Shorter died in Los Angeles, California, on March 2, 2023, aged 89.

== Honors and recognition ==
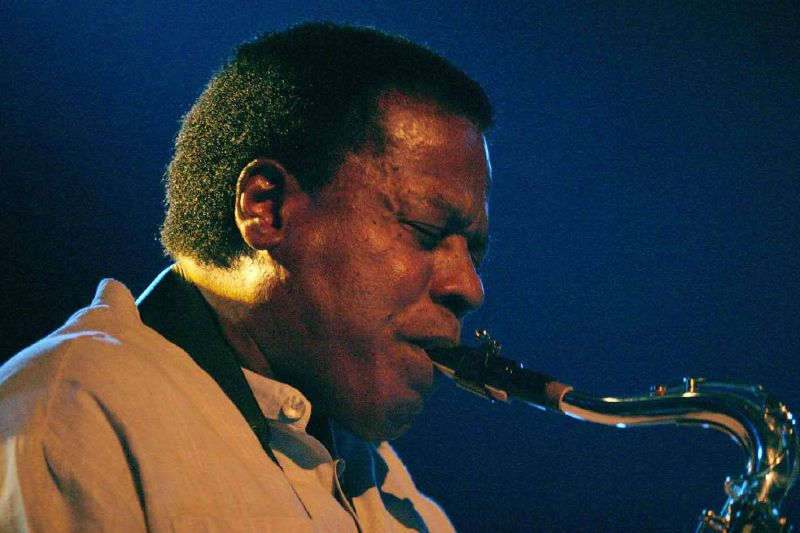
Shorter performing in 2006

In 1999, Shorter received an Honorary Doctorate of Music from the Berklee College of Music.

On September 17, 2013, Shorter received a Lifetime Achievement Award from the Herbie Hancock Institute of Jazz (formerly Thelonious Monk Institute of Jazz).

On December 18, 2014, the Recording Academy announced that Shorter had been awarded the Grammy Lifetime Achievement Award in honor of his "prolific contributions to our culture and history".

In 2016, Shorter was awarded a Guggenheim Fellowship in music composition, the only jazz artist to receive the honor that year.

In 2017, Shorter was announced as the joint winner of the Polar Music Prize. The award committee stated: "Without the musical explorations of Wayne Shorter, modern music would not have drilled so deep."

In 2018, Shorter received the Kennedy Center Honors Award from the John F. Kennedy Center for the Performing Arts for his lifetime of contributions to the arts.

On April 29, 2022, Shorter's hometown of Newark renamed a street in his honor. Park Place was renamed "Wayne Shorter Way".

On April 22, 2023, the BBC Radio Three magazine program J to Z broadcast a 90-minute tribute to Shorter, hosted by Julian Joseph.

In August 2023, Herbie Hancock hosted a tribute concert at Hollywood Bowl, featuring a large number of performers including Carlos Santana and Joni Mitchell.

=== Awards ===
| Year | Nominated work | Category | Award | Result | Notes | Ref. |
|---|---|---|---|---|---|---|
| 1962 | Wayne Shorter | New Star Saxophonist | DownBeat Readers Poll | Won | | |
| 1972 | I Sing The Body Electric | Best Jazz Fusion Performance, Vocal Or Instrumental | Grammy Award | Nominated | with Weather Report | |
| 1979 | 8:30 | Best Jazz Fusion Performance, Vocal Or Instrumental | Grammy Award | Won | with Weather Report | |
| 1981 | Night Passage | Best Jazz Fusion Performance, Vocal Or Instrumental | Grammy Award | Nominated | with Weather Report | |
| 1982 | Weather Report | Best Jazz Fusion Performance, Vocal Or Instrumental | Grammy Award | Nominated | with Weather Report | |
| 1983 | Procession | Best Jazz Fusion Performance, Vocal Or Instrumental | Grammy Award | Nominated | with Weather Report | |
| 1985 | Sportin' Life | Best Jazz Fusion Performance, Vocal Or Instrumental | Grammy Award | Nominated | with Weather Report | |
| 1985 | Atlantis | Best Jazz Fusion Performance, Vocal Or Instrumental | Grammy Award | Nominated | | |
| 1987 | "Call Sheet Blues" | Best Instrumental Composition | Grammy Award | Won | with Herbie Hancock, Ron Carter and Billy Higgins from The Other Side of Round Midnight Featuring Dexter Gordon | |
| 1994 | A Tribute to Miles | Best Jazz Instrumental Performance, Individual or Group | Grammy Award | Won | | |
| 1994 | "Pinocchio " | Best Jazz Instrumental Solo | Grammy Award | Nominated | from A Tribute to Miles | |
| 1996 | Wayne Shorter | Lifetime achievement | Miles Davis Award | Won | The Miles Davis Award is given by the Montreal International Jazz Festival to "honor a great international jazz musician for the entire body of his or her work and influence in regenerating the jazz idiom." | |
| 1996 | High Life | Best Contemporary Jazz Album | Grammy Award | Won | | |
| 1996 | "Children Of The Night" | Best Instrumental Arrangement | Grammy Award | Nominated | from High Life | |
| 1996 | "Midnight In Carlotta's Hair" | Best Instrumental Composition | Grammy Award | Nominated | from High Life | |
| 1997 | "Aung San Suu Kyi" | Best Instrumental Composition | Grammy Award | Won | from Herbie Hancock's1+1 | |
| 1998 | Wayne Shorter | Lifetime achievement | NEA Jazz Masters Fellowship | Won | NEA Jazz Masters Fellowships are awarded by National Endowment for the Arts to "musicians who have reached an exceptionally high standard of achievement in this very specialized art form." Each fellowship includes a monetary award. | |
| 1999 | "In Walked Wayne" | Best Jazz Instrumental Solo | Grammy Award | Won | from J.J. Johnson's Heroes | |
| 2002 | Footprints Live! | Best Jazz Instrumental Album, Individual or Group | Grammy Award | Nominated | | |
| 2002 | Wayne Shorter | Significant contributions to the evolution of jazz | Beacons in Jazz Award | Won | bestowed by The New School's Jazz & Contemporary Music Program | |
| 2003 | "Sacajawea" | Best Instrumental Composition | Grammy Award | Won | from Alegría | |
| 2003 | Alegría | Best Jazz Instrumental Performance, Individual or Group | Grammy Award | Won | | |
| 2005 | Beyond the Sound Barrier | Best Jazz Instrumental Performance, Individual or Group | Grammy Award | Won | | |
| 2006 | Wayne Shorter | Soprano Saxophone Player of the Year | Downbeat Critics' Poll | Won | | |
| 2006 | Wayne Shorter Quartet | Jazz Group of the Year | Downbeat Critics' Poll | Won | | |
| 2006 | Wayne Shorter Quartet | Small Ensemble Group of the Year | Jazz Journalists Association Jazz Award | Won | | |
| 2008 | Wayne Shorter | Soprano Saxophone Player of the Year | DownBeat Critics Poll | Won | | |
| 2013 | Without A Net | Jazz Album of the Year | DownBeat Critics Poll | Won | with Wayne Shorter Quartet | |
| 2013 | Wayne Shorter | Artist of the Year | DownBeat Critics Poll | Won | | |
| 2013 | Wayne Shorter | Soprano Saxophone Player of the Year | DownBeat Critics Poll | Won | | |
| 2013 | Wayne Shorter Quartet | Jazz Group | DownBeat Critics Poll | Won | | |
| 2013 | Wayne Shorter Quartet | Jazz Group | DownBeat Readers Poll | Won | | |
| 2014 | "Orbits" | Best Jazz Instrumental Solo | Grammy Award | Won | from Without a Net | |
| 2014 | Wayne Shorter | Achiever | Golden Plate Award | Won | bestowed by American Academy of Achievement; presented by Awards Council member Willie L. Brown Jr. | |
| 2014 | Wayne Shorter Quartet | Jazz Group | DownBeat Critics Poll | Won | | |
| 2015 | Wayne Shorter | Soprano Saxophone Player of the Year | DownBeat Critics Poll | Won | | |
| 2016 | Wayne Shorter | Soprano Saxophone Player of the Year | DownBeat Critics Poll | Won | | |
| 2016 | Wayne Shorter | Soprano Saxophone Player of the Year | DownBeat Readers Poll | Won | | |
| 2017 | Wayne Shorter | Soprano Saxophone Player of the Year | DownBeat Critics Poll | Won | | |
| 2017 | Wayne Shorter | Exceptional achievement | Polar Music Prize | Won | | |
| 2017 | Wayne Shorter | Musical Arts | Rolf Schock Prizes | Won | | |
| 2019 | Wayne Shorter | Jazz Artist | DownBeat Readers Poll | Won | | |
| 2019 | Wayne Shorter | Soprano Saxophone Player of the Year | DownBeat Readers Poll | Won | | |
| 2019 | Emanon | Jazz Album | DownBeat Readers Poll | Won | | |
| 2019 | Emanon | Best Jazz Instrumental Album | Grammy Award | Won | | |
| 2021 | Wayne Shorter | On-going innovation and impact in the field of jazz | Doris Duke Performing Artist Award | Won | sponsored by the Doris Duke Charitable Foundation | |
| 2023 | "Endangered Species" | Best Improvised Jazz Solo | Grammy Award | Won | with Leo Genovese | |
| 2023 | Live at the Detroit Jazz Festival | Best Jazz Instrumental Album | Grammy Award | Nominated | with Terri Lyne Carrington, Leo Genovese, and Esperanza Spalding | |

== Discography ==
- Introducing Wayne Shorter (aka Blues a la Carte, Vee-Jay, 1959)
- Second Genesis (Vee-Jay, rec. 1960, rel. 1974)
- Wayning Moments (Vee-Jay, 1962)
- Night Dreamer (Blue Note, 1964)
- JuJu (Blue Note, rec. 1964, rel. 1965)
- Speak No Evil (Blue Note, rec. 1964, rel. 1966)
- The Soothsayer (Blue Note, rec. 1965, rel. 1979)
- Etcetera (Blue Note, rec. 1965, rel. 1980)
- The All Seeing Eye (Blue Note, rec. 1965, rel. 1966)
- Adam's Apple (Blue Note, rec. 1966, rel. 1967)
- Schizophrenia (Blue Note, rec. 1967, rel. 1969)
- Super Nova (Blue Note, 1969)
- Moto Grosso Feio (Blue Note, rec. 1970, rel. 1974)
- Odyssey of Iska (Blue Note, rec. 1970, rel. 1971)
- Native Dancer (Columbia, rec. 1974, rel. 1975) with Milton Nascimento
- Atlantis (Columbia, 1985)
- Phantom Navigator (Columbia, rec. 1986, rel. 1987)
- Joy Ryder (Columbia, 1988)
- High Life (Verve, 1995)
- 1+1 (Verve, 1997) with Herbie Hancock
- Footprints Live! (Verve, 2002)
- Alegría (Verve, 2003)
- Beyond the Sound Barrier (Verve, rec. live 2002–2004, rel. 2005) as Wayne Shorter Quartet
- Carlos Santana and Wayne Shorter – Live at the Montreux Jazz Festival 1988 (Image Entertainment, 2007) with Carlos Santana
- Without a Net (Blue Note, rec. live 2010, rel. 2013) as Wayne Shorter Quartet
- Celebration Volume 1 (Blue Note, 2024)
