= Etcetera (album) =

Studio album by Wayne Shorter
- Released: 1980; 1995 (CD)
- Recorded: June 14, 1965
- Studio: Van Gelder Studio, Englewood Cliffs, NJ
- Genre: Jazz
- Length: 43:13
- Label: Blue Note; LT 1056; CDP 533581
- Producer: Alfred Lion

Wayne Shorter chronology
The Soothsayer (1965)	Etcetera (1980)	The All Seeing Eye (1965)

Alternative cover
- CD release (1995)

Etcetera is the eighth album by saxophonist Wayne Shorter, recorded on June 14, 1965, but not released on Blue Note until 1980. The album features four originals by Shorter and an arrangement of Gil Evans' "Barracudas" performed by a quartet with pianist Herbie Hancock, bassist Cecil McBee and drummer Joe Chambers.

== Reception ==
The AllMusic review by Stacia Proefrock stated: "The low-key nature of the album as a whole, especially the title track, might have contributed to Blue Note's lack of attention, but there are definitely gems here, especially the closing track, 'Indian Song.' At times the rest of the album seems like a warm-up for that amazing tune, where Shorter swirls around in a hypnotizing dance with Herbie Hancock's piano, grounded by the nocturnal bass of Cecil McBee and the airy structure of Joe Chambers' drumming. The short, repetitive themes and passionate, soulful playing echo John Coltrane, but this quartet has its own flavor, and the perfect, intricate web they weave here helps pull the whole session up to a higher level."

Professional ratings
Review scores
Source	Rating
AllMusic	4.5/5 stars
The Penguin Guide to Jazz Recordings	3.5/4 stars
The Rolling Stone Jazz Record Guide	5/5 stars

== Track listing ==
All compositions by Wayne Shorter except where noted.

1. "Etcetera" – 6:21
2. "Penelope" – 6:46
3. "Toy Tune" – 7:24
4. "Barracudas (General Assembly)" (Evans) – 11:07
5. "Indian Song" – 11:35

== Personnel ==
- Wayne Shorter – tenor saxophone
- Herbie Hancock – piano
- Cecil McBee – bass
- Joe Chambers – drums
