= Emanon (Wayne Shorter album) =

Recording by Wayne Shorter
- Released: September 14, 2018
- Recorded: 2016
- Venues: The Barbican, London
- Studios: Avatar (New York, New York); Danilo's Jazz Club, American Trade Hotel, Casco Viejo, Panama
- Genre: Jazz
- Length: 2:07:15
- Label: Blue Note 509999 79516 2 9
- Producers: Wayne Shorter, Don Was

Wayne Shorter chronology
| Without a Net (2013) | Emanon (2018) | Live at the Detroit Jazz Festival (2022) |

Emanon is a three-disc album by jazz musician Wayne Shorter. The album was released on September 14, 2018, via Blue Note label, containing both studio and live recordings. It features his quartet with pianist Danilo Pérez, bassist John Patitucci and drummer Brian Blade. Emanon was initially a physical-only release available in two versions—a Standard Edition that includes three CDs with the graphic novel, and a Deluxe Edition that packages three vinyl LPs and three CDs with the graphic novel enclosed in a hardcover slipcase. As of January 26, 2019, the album has been added to the streaming service Spotify.

== Background ==
"Emanon" is a title taken from a Dizzy Gillespie and Milton Shaw composition "Noname" spelled backward. The album is Shorter's first in five years. The set is accompanied by a 74-page graphic novel created by Shorter together with writer Monica Sly and artist Randy DuBurke, whose career includes work for DC Comics. The book is a futuristic fantasy supported by Shorter's philosophy of art. It tells the story of a “rogue philosopher” named Emanon who travels among worlds, spreading a message of truth and empowerment and fighting against the powers of evil. In his biography Shorter, a practicing Buddhist, explained "At this point I'm looking to express eternity in composition".

== Recording ==
Disc 1 was recorded in New York City and Casco Viejo, Panama, in 2016 and features Shorter's quartet in a studio session with the 34-piece Orpheus Chamber Orchestra. Discs 2 and 3 were recorded live in the Barbican Centre, London, as a follow-up project of his previous album Without a Net. Wayne Shorter and Don Was produced the release.

== Reception ==
Professional ratings
Aggregate scores
| Source | Rating |
|---|---|
| Metacritic | 79/100 |
Review scores
| Source | Rating |
| All About Jazz | 5/5 stars |
| AllMusic | 4.5/5 stars |
| Evening Standard | 3/5 stars |
| Financial Times | 5/5 stars |
| Glide Magazine | 9/10 |
| The Guardian | 4/5 stars |
| Pitchfork | 7.5/10 |
| PopMatters | 8/10 |
| Rolling Stone | 4/5 stars |
| The Times | 4/5 stars |

At Metacritic, which assigns a weighted mean rating out of 100 to reviews from mainstream critics, the album received an average score of 79, based on nine reviews, which indicates "generally favorable reviews". It would finish in first place in the 2018 NPR Music Jazz Critics Poll.

Larry Blumenfeld of The Wall Street Journal stated "Mr. Shorter's music has always demanded alternate routes and suggested parallel worlds—it implies a multiverse of sorts. This package frames such ideas with splendor, elevating his stature in unexpected ways". Chris Pearson of The Times wrote "By now we should have learnt to trust Wayne Shorter, the great saxophonist whose credits stretch back to Miles Davis and Weather Report. Still, one trembles at the prospect of his latest project, a triple orchestral album swimming in armchair philosophy, cod sociology and sci-fi and accompanied by a comic book. It sounds barmy and boring, but wait — come back. It's actually brilliantly beautiful". John Fordham of The Guardian added "If newcomers discover Shorter via this luxurious multimedia package, then Emanon will have done its job – but the music here is all that it really takes". John Garratt of PopMatters noted "We can't go handing great reviews to Wayne Shorter just because he's Wayne Shorter; he has to prove that he can deliver the goods all over again. With Emanon, he has".

At the 61st Grammy Awards, Emanon won the Best Jazz Instrumental Album category.

== Track listing ==
All tracks written by Wayne Shorter, except "She Moves Through the Fair" - Traditional, arrangement by Shorter.

Disc 1

| No. | Title | Length |
|---|---|---|
| 1. | "Pegasus" | 14:55 |
| 2. | "Prometheus Unbound" | 8:19 |
| 3. | "Lotus" | 15:17 |
| 4. | "The Three Marias" | 12:30 |

Recorded by the Wayne Shorter Quartet with Orpheus Chamber Orchestra at Avatar Studios, New York, and at Danilo's Jazz Club, American Trade Hotel, Casco Viejo, Panama.

Disc 2

| No. | Title | Length |
|---|---|---|
| 1. | "The Three Marias" | 27:31 |
| 2. | "Lost and Orbits Medley" | 9:51 |

Recorded by the Wayne Shorter Quartet live at The Barbican, London, UK.

Disc 3

| No. | Title | Length |
|---|---|---|
| 1. | "Lotus" | 13:36 |
| 2. | "She Moves Through the Fair" | 6:24 |
| 3. | "Adventures Aboard the Golden Mean" | 4:31 |
| 4. | "Prometheus Unbound" | 14:26 |

Recorded by the Wayne Shorter Quartet live at The Barbican, London, UK.

== Personnel ==
- Wayne Shorter – tenor saxophone, soprano saxophone
- John Patitucci – bass
- Brian Blade – drums
- Danilo Pérez – piano
