= Speak No Evil (Wayne Shorter album) =

Studio album by Wayne Shorter
- Released: June 1966
- Recorded: December 24, 1964
- Studios: Van Gelder; Englewood Cliffs
- Genres: Post-bop, hard bop, modal jazz
- Length: 42:16
- Label: Blue Note
- Producer: Alfred Lion

Wayne Shorter chronology
JuJu (1965)	Speak No Evil (1966)	The All Seeing Eye (1966)

Speak No Evil is the sixth album by Wayne Shorter. It was released in June 1966 by Blue Note Records. The music combines elements of hard bop and modal jazz, and features Shorter on tenor saxophone, trumpeter Freddie Hubbard, pianist Herbie Hancock, bassist Ron Carter and drummer Elvin Jones. The cover photo shows Shorter on the left, with his first wife, Teruko (Irene) Nakagami, whom he met in 1961.

== Reception ==
Professional ratings
Review scores
Source	Rating
AllMusic	5/5 stars
DownBeat	3/5 stars
The Penguin Guide to Jazz Recordings	4/4 stars
The Rolling Stone Jazz Record Guide	5/5 stars

Speak No Evil was one of several albums Shorter recorded for Blue Note in 1964, his first year as a member of Miles Davis's mid-1960s quintet. The album is generally regarded as one of Shorter's finest, and also a highlight of the Blue Note catalogue. The Penguin Guide to Jazz selected this album as part of its suggested "Core Collection" calling it "by far Shorter's most satisfying record". Murray Horwitz stated in 2001 that "Speak No Evil is sort of a consolidation of Wayne Shorter's compositional excellence. It's so thorough and consistent and wide-ranging. It's almost a manifesto for his ideas. Those ideas were new 40 years ago, but they're still fresh today." Rough Guide author Ian Carr wrote it is "a classic album in terms of both composition and improvisation, and has been inspirational for many musicians". New York Times critic Ben Ratliff included the album in his publication Jazz: A Critic's Guide to the 100 Most Important Recordings stating that it offers "the first taste of a gnomic compositional style that would haunt jazz forevermore. [...] Just about everybody playing jazz born in the 1950s and after accepts it as a foundation."

== Releases ==
Speak No Evil was initially released on LP in 1966, as BLP 4194 and BST 84194. The first CD release was in 1987. A 1999 CD version, supervised by Rudy Van Gelder, included an alternate take of "Dance Cadaverous". A remastered limited edition was issued in Japan on SHM-CD in 2013, including two previously unissued alternate takes.

In 2015, the original master tapes were remastered and cut in the all-analog domain by Kevin Gray for Music Matters Ltd as part of their Blue Note: The Definitive Vinyl Reissue Series.

In January 2020, a new vinyl version remastered by Kevin Gray from the original analog master tapes was released by Blue Note as part of their Classic Vinyl Reissue Series.

== Track listing ==
All compositions by Wayne Shorter.

Side A
No.	Title	Length
1.	"Witch Hunt"	8:11
2.	"Fee-Fi-Fo-Fum"	5:54
3.	"Dance Cadaverous"	6:45

Side B
No.	Title	Length
1.	"Speak No Evil"	8:23
2.	"Infant Eyes"	6:54
3.	"Wild Flower"	6:06

Bonus track on CD reissue (1999)
No.	Title	Length
7.	"Dance Cadaverous" (alternate take)	6:37

Bonus tracks on remastered SHM-CD release (2013)
No.	Title	Length
8.	"Witch Hunt" (alternate take)	6:55
9.	"Fee-Fi-Fo-Fum" (alternate take)	5:59

== Personnel ==
- Wayne Shorter – tenor saxophone
- Freddie Hubbard – trumpet (except "Infant Eyes")
- Herbie Hancock – piano
- Ron Carter – bass
- Elvin Jones – drums

== Charts ==
Chart performance for Speak No Evil
Chart (2021)	Peak position
US Top Album Sales (Billboard)	85
US Top Jazz Albums (Billboard)	6

Chart (2026)	Peak position
Greek Albums (IFPI)	59
