= Native Dancer (album) =

1975 Wayne Shorter album

Studio album by Wayne Shorter featuring Milton Nascimento
- Released: January 18, 1975
- Recorded: September 12, 1974
- Studios: The Village Recorder, Los Angeles, California
- Genre: Jazz fusion
- Length: 41:41
- Languages: English, Portuguese
- Label: Columbia
- Producer: Jim Price

Wayne Shorter chronology
| Moto Grosso Feio (1974) | Native Dancer (1975) | Atlantis (1985) |

Milton Nascimento chronology
| Milagre dos Peixes (1973) | Native Dancer (1975) | Minas (1975) |

Professional ratings
Review scores
| Source | Rating |
|---|---|
| AllMusic | 4/5 stars |
| The Penguin Guide to Jazz | 3/4 stars |
| The Rolling Stone Jazz Record Guide | 5/5 stars |
| Sputnikmusic | 4/5 |

Native Dancer is an album by Wayne Shorter featuring Milton Nascimento, and features some of his most acclaimed compositions. It is notable for blending jazz, rock and funk elements with Brazilian rhythms in an attempt to create "world" music broadly accessible to people from many different cultures. Many American musicians have mentioned being influenced by the album, including bassist Esperanza Spalding, drummer Chester Thompson and vocalist Maurice White of Earth, Wind, and Fire.

== Track listing ==
1. "Ponta de Areia" (Milton Nascimento, Fernando Brant) – 5:18
2. "Beauty and the Beast" (Wayne Shorter) – 5:04
3. "Tarde" (Nascimento, Márcio Borges) – 5:49
4. "Miracle of the Fishes" (Nascimento, Brant) – 4:48
5. "Diana" (Wayne Shorter) – 3:04
6. "From the Lonely Afternoons" (Nascimento, Brant) – 3:15
7. "Ana Maria" (Shorter) – 5:10
8. "Lilia" (Nascimento) – 7:03
9. "Joanna's Theme" (Herbie Hancock) – 4:17

== Personnel ==
Musicians

- Wayne Shorter – soprano saxophone (tracks 1–2, 4, 7–9), tenor saxophone (tracks 4–6), piano (tracks 5–7), electric piano (track 8)
- Milton Nascimento – vocals (tracks 1, 3–4, 6, 8), acoustic guitar (tracks 3–4, 6, 8)
- David Amaro – acoustic guitar (tracks 4, 6–7, 9)
- Jay Graydon – electric guitar (track 1), bass (track 2)
- Herbie Hancock – piano (tracks 1–2, 7, 9), electric piano (track 3)
- Wagner Tiso – organ (tracks 1, 3–4, 7), electric piano (tracks 1–2, 4, 6, 9), bass (track 8)
- Dave McDaniel – bass (tracks 1, 3–7, 9)
- Robertinho Silva – drums (tracks 1–4, 6–8), percussion (tracks 5, 9)
- Airto Moreira – percussion (tracks 2, 4–5, 7–8)

Production

- Jim Price – producer
- Wly – engineer (lacquer cutting)
- Wally Traugott – engineer (mastering)
- Robert Fraboni – engineer
- Joe Tuzen – assistant engineer
- Nancy Donald – artwork
- Kenneth McGowan – photography

== See also ==
- Weather Report, Mysterious Traveller (1974)
- Weather Report, Tale Spinnin' (1975)
