= Vitoria-Gasteiz jazz festival =

Coordinates: 42.8500°N 2.6833°W

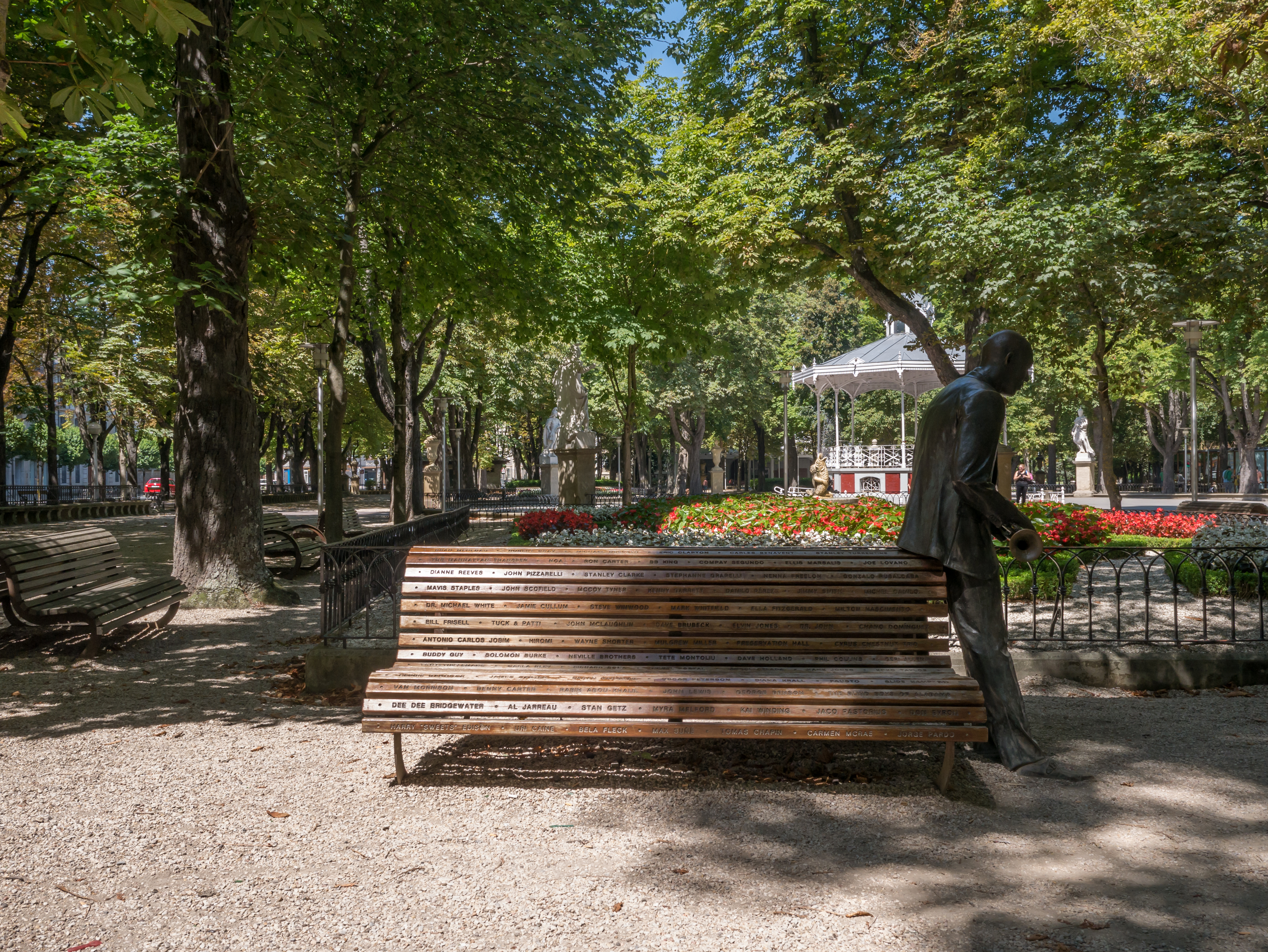
Sculpture of Wynton Marsalis and bench showing names of musicians who performed at the festival over the years, in a city park of Vitoria

The Vitoria-Gasteiz Jazz Festival has been celebrated annually in July since 1977, in Vitoria-Gasteiz, Spain.

== History ==
Initially, the festival lasted two days. In 1981, artists including Oscar Peterson and Muddy Waters began to appear. Later came Ella Fitzgerald, Dizzy Gillespie with Stan Getz, Sarah Vaughan and Jaco Pastorius. Since 1995, the festival has been celebrated in Mendizorrotza, expanding to a full week of concerts and music-related activities.

In 1999, in its 14th edition, the series Jazz of the 21st Century provided an opportunity for jazz musicians coming to Spain for the first time. Artists such as Noa, Gonzalo Rubalcaba, Esperanza Spalding, Thomas Chapin and Esbjörn Svensson have been featured.

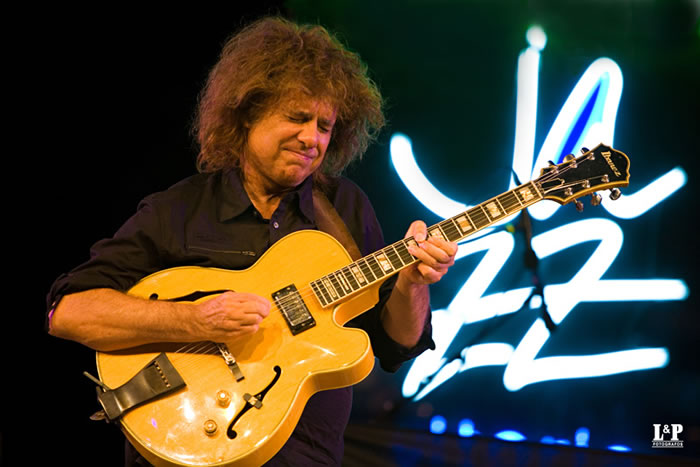
Pat Metheny in the Vitoria-Gasteiz Jazz Festival

The festival also introduced an educational program for students and professionals which drew teachers including Joe Pass, Herb Ellis, Ray Brown, Wynton Marsalis, Pat Metheny, Juilliard School of New York and Fred Hersch. There have been meetings in Vitoria-Gasteiz that have passed to the music history such as Dizzy Gillespie with Stan Getz, Chick Corea with Bobby McFerrin, Paco de Lucía with Wynton Marsalis and Jamie Cullum with José James.

The festival inspired Wynton Marsalis to compose Vitoria Suite with the Jazz at Lincoln Center Orchestra and Paco de Lucía as guest. In 2010, it was presented as a CD, as a tribute to Vitoria-Gasteiz and its festival.

The festival is the only Spanish festival that belongs to the IJFO (International Jazz Festival Organization).
