= The Swing of Delight =

Studio album by Devadip Carlos Santana
- Released: August 1980
- Genre: Jazz
- Length: 56:59
- Label: Columbia
- Producer: David Rubinson & Friends, Inc.

Devadip Carlos Santana chronology
Marathon (1979)	The Swing of Delight (1980)	Zebop! (1981)

The Swing of Delight is a 1980 double album by Carlos Santana. It was released under his temporary Sanskrit name Devadip Carlos Santana, given to him by Sri Chinmoy. It peaked at #65 on the charts.

On the album, Santana is joined by musicians from the Santana band as well as members of Miles Davis' 1960s quintet: saxophonist Wayne Shorter, pianist Herbie Hancock, bassist Ron Carter, and drummer Tony Williams, whom Santana described as "the best musicians on the planet." Santana later recalled that he was "scared to death" in the studio, but stated that playing with such top-notch musicians "will make a guitar player turn down—turn it down and go deep, deep inside himself for the inner stuff."

The Swing of Delight was the last album on which Santana used the name Devadip, as he left Chinmoy's circle in 1982 due to his having become disillusioned with the guru.

== Reception ==
Professional ratings
Review scores
Source	Rating
AllMusic	2/5 stars
The Rolling Stone Album Guide	2.5/5 stars

In a review for AllMusic, William Ruhlmann called the album "a varied, jazz-oriented session that was one of [Carlos Santana's] more pleasant excursions from the standard Santana sound."

Rob Caldwell of All About Jazz stated that the album "hangs together remarkably well and still sounds fresh," and praised the "exemplary accompanying musicians."

Writing for Elsewhere, Graham Reid called the recording "One of those albums which was fascinating at the time, disappeared into history and which, when pulled off the shelf again offers some rewarding pieces as much as it frustrates at times."

== Track listing ==
=== Side one ===
1. "Swapan Tari" (Sri Chinmoy) – 6:46
2. "Love Theme from "Spartacus"" (Alex North) – 6:50

=== Side two ===
1. "Phuler Matan" (Chinmoy) – 5:52
2. "Song for My Brother" (Carlos Santana) – 6:56

=== Side three ===
1. "Jharna Kala" (Chinmoy) – 7:11
2. "Gardenia" (Santana) – 7:08

=== Side four ===
1. "La Llave" (Santana) – 3:40
2. "Golden Hours" (Santana) – 6:36
3. "Sher Khan, the Tiger" (Wayne Shorter) – 5:45

== Personnel ==
Musicians

- Devadip Carlos Santana – electric guitar, acoustic guitar, 12-string guitar, percussion, vocals
- Wayne Shorter – soprano saxophone (tracks: 2, 6, 9), tenor saxophone (tracks: 3, 9)
- Premik Russell Tubbs – soprano saxophone (tracks: 1, 3), tenor saxophone (tracks: 4, 5), flute (tracks: 8)
- Herbie Hancock – acoustic piano, Fender Rhodes electric piano, Hohner Clavinet, synthesizers (Clavitar, Prophet 5, Yamaha CS-80, Oberheim Eight Voice, brass, strings)
- Ron Carter – acoustic bass (tracks: 2, 3, 6, 7, 9)
- David Margen – bass (tracks: 1, 4, 5, 8,)
- Harvey Mason – drums (tracks: 2, 4, 7, 9)
- Graham Lear – drums (tracks: 5, 8)
- Tony Williams – drums (tracks: 1, 3, 6)
- Armando Peraza – congas, bongos, percussion
- Raul Rekow – congas, percussion, vocals
- Orestes Vilató – timbales, percussion, vocals

Production

- Engineer [assistant] – Bob Kovach
- Engineer [digital] – Jeff Mestler, Paul Stubblebine
- Engineer [guitar for Devadip Carlos Santana] – Steve Cain
- Engineer [keyboard for Herbie Hancock] – Bryan Bell
- Engineer [original mixing], producer – David Rubinson
- Engineer [recording] – Leslie Ann Jones
- Reissue producer – Moto Uehara
- Remastered by – Kouji Suzuki
- Design [concept] – Devadip Carlos Santana
- Artwork [front cover art] – Sri Chinmoy
- Artwork [inside art] – Tadanori Yokoo
- Photography by – Roger Ressmeyer

== Charts ==
Chart (1980)	Peak position
Australian Albums (Kent Music Report)	21
Austrian Albums (Ö3 Austria)	14
German Albums (Offizielle Top 100)	40
New Zealand Albums (RMNZ)	20
Norwegian Albums (VG-lista)	23
Swedish Albums (Sverigetopplistan)	28
UK Albums (OCC)	65
US Billboard 200	65
