= Myron Walden =

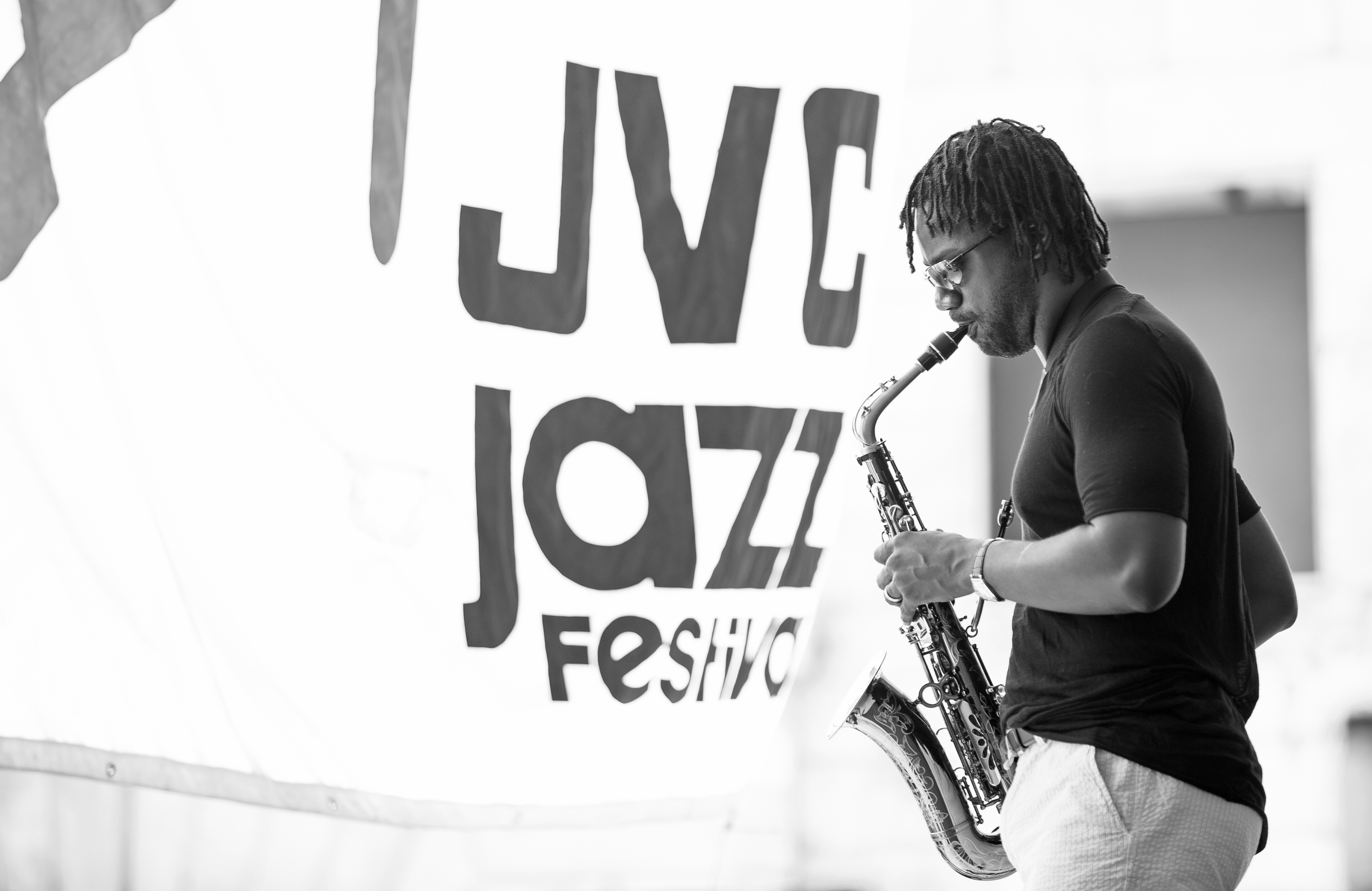
- Myron Walden at the 2014 Newport Jazz Festival

Background information
- Born: October 18, 1972 (age 54)
- Origin: Miami, Florida
- Genre: jazz
- Instruments: saxophone, flute, bass clarinet
- Years active: 1995–present
- Website: https://www.myronwalden.com/

Myron Walden (born October 18, 1972) is an American musician, composer, and arranger who is known for his work as a saxophonist, flutist, and bass clarinetist. He has previously recorded and toured with Freddie Hubbard, Ray Barretto, Esperanza Spalding, and Somi.

== Early life and education ==
Myron Walden was born in Miami, Florida, and he moved to The Bronx at the age of twelve. His interest in the alto saxophone developed when he witnessed the close attention his uncle paid to the Charlie Parker record One Night in Washington. Walden was able to procure an alto sax from his middle school music appreciation teacher, and a saxophone player who lived in his building gave him an instruction book. Walden was self-taught until he enrolled in the LaGuardia High School of Music & Art, where he met frequent collaborators Dwayne Burno and Eric McPherson.

Walden went on to attend the Manhattan School of Music, and in 1993 won first place in a Charlie Parker competition, which earned him a guest spot with Wynton Marsalis and the Jazz at Lincoln Center Orchestra.

== Career ==
Walden began his professional career playing with Roy Hargrove's big band at the Jazz Gallery in 1995, then performed at Smalls with artists such as Kurt Rosenwinkel, Eddie Henderson, Kevin Hays, Stephen Scott, Greg Hutchinson and Eric Harland. Eventually he earned a regular gig on Wednesday nights with his Apex Trio, featuring McPherson (drums) and Burno (bass), who primarily played Walden's own original compositions. Walden recorded and releases six albums as a leader between 1995 and 2005, two each on NYC Records, his own Demi Sound Records, and Fresh Sound New Talent. During this period, he became a member of Brian Blade's Fellowship Band and The New Jazz Composers Octet, which made three recordings as a unit and two with Freddie Hubbard (with whom they performed several times at the Iridium).

Walden then took a nearly five-year break from recording as a leader in order to develop his skills on the tenor and soprano saxophones while composing specifically for those instruments. He released five albums on his record label, Demi Sound, over the course of 2009 and 2010. A four-CD live set followed in 2013.

Walden returned in 2025 after a nearly 13 year hiatus from recording as a leader with Flute and Strings on JMI Recordings, which featured Walden on various flutes accompanied by a string quintet.

== Style and critical reception ==
According to JazzTimes, Walden "plays with a Phoenix-like virtuosity and an attention to rhythmic detail rarely heard among saxophone players". All About Jazz cites him as "one of the true bright stars of his generation" who "has a very distinctive sharp tone with a rounded nasaly-inflection" and "has shown the ability to develop solos with both an incisive logic and an organic level of invention." Describing his performance on tenor sax, writer John Kelman said that Walden was "as thoughtful yet fiery a player on the bigger horn as he is on alto" and called his 2009 release Momentum "a document of one of the modern mainstream's most provocative saxophonists, composers, and bandleaders," favorably comparing Walden's composition "Like a Flower Seeking the Sun" to Wayne Shorter's title track from Miles Davis's album Nefertiti. Writing in Down Beat magazine, Ted Panken describes Walden as "a widely respected musician's musician with a keening, instantly recognizable voice."

Walden frequently plays in a pianoless trio or quartet format, though his flurry of release from 2009 through 2013 all included keyboards. His 2010 album Countyfied featured an organ trio, the sound of which Walden described as "Southern-fried soul meets a little blues and rock 'n' roll," while his dual In This World releases took a "harmonically fortified quiet storm" approach (according to Panken) with a quintet featuring guitarist Mike Moreno and keyboardist Jon Cowherd, among others.

== Discography ==
=== As leader ===
- Hypnosis (NYC Music, 1996)
- Like a Flower Seeking the Sun (NYC Music, 1999)
- Apex - Volume One (Demi Sound, 2000)
- Apex - Volume Two (Demi Sound, 2000)
- Higher Ground (Fresh Sound New Talent, 2002)
- This Way (Fresh Sound New Talent, 2005)
- Momentum (Demi Sound, 2009)
- Momentum Live (Demi Sound, 2009)
- In This World: What We Share (Demi Sound, 2010)
- In This World: To Feel (Demi Sound, 2010)
- Countryfied (Demi Sound, 2010)
- Momentum Live: Our Sound (Demi Sound, 2013)
- Flutes and Strings (JMI Recordings, 2025)

=== As sideman ===
==== with Brian Blade & The Fellowship Band ====
- Brian Blade Fellowship (Blue Note, 1998)
- Perceptual (Blue Note, 2000)
- Season of Changes (Verve, 2008)
- Landmarks (Blue Note, 2014)
- Body and Shadow (Blue Note, 2017)
- Live from the archives Bootleg June 15, 2000 Blues Alley Washington D.C. (Stoner Hill, 2022)
- Kings Highway (Stoner Hill, 2023)

==== with others ====
- Spirits in the Night - Dan Faulk (Fresh Sound New Talent, 1995)
- Love Requiem - Russell Gunn (High Note, 1999)
- First Steps into Reality - The New Jazz Composers Octet (Fresh Sound New Talent, 1999)
- Premonition - Jason Lindner (MCA, 2000)
- New Colors - Freddie Hubbard (Hip Bop Essence, 2001)
- Wise Children - Tom Harrell (Bluebird, 2003)
- Walkin' the Line - The New Jazz Composers Octet (Fresh Sound New Talent, 2003)
- Treats for the Nightwalker - Josh Roseman (Enja, 2003)
- Salt - Lizz Wright (Verve, 2003)
- Insight - Jeremy Pelt (Criss Cross Jazz, 2003)
- Tales of the Stuttering Mime - Eric Revis (11:11 Records, 2004)
- Mirror - David Weiss (Fresh Sound New Talent, 2004)
- Attack of Wren: Wrenaissance Volume One - Darren Barrett (Nagel Heyer, 2004)
- Time Was - Time Is - Ray Barretto (O+ Music, 2005)
- Late August - Gregg August (Iacuessa, 2005)
- Identity - Jeremy Pelt (MAXJAZZ, 2005)
- The Source - Kendrick Scott Oracle (World Culture, 2007)
- Metalix - Matthias Lupri (Summit, 2006)
- Interwords - Dan McCarthy (2006)
- Asking No Permission - Omer Avital (Smalls, 2006)
- Room to Grow - Omer Avital (Smalls, 2007)
- One Peace - Gregg August (Iacuessa, 2007)
- The Turning Gate - The New Jazz Composers Octet (Motéma, 2008)
- On the Real Side - Freddie Hubbard (Times Square, 2008)
- After Hours (Moonlamps & Other Ballads) - Matthias Lupri (Summit, 2010)
- When Words Fail - David Weiss (Motéma, 2014)
- Live and Direct - Darren Barrett dB Quintet (DB Studios, 2014)
