= The New Jazz Composers Octet =

- Origin: New York, New York
- Genres: Jazz, Hard Bop
- Years active: 1997–present
- Labels: Motéma Music; Fresh Sound/New Talent
- Members: David Weiss; Myron Walden; Jimmy Greene; Steve Davis; Norbert Stachel; Xavier Davis; Dwayne Burno; Nasheet Waits
- Past members: Andrew Williams; Craig Handy; Danny Grissett; Gregory Tardy; James Farnsworth; Dave Rickenberg; Chris Karlic; Joe Chambers

The New Jazz Composers Octet is an all-acoustic jazz ensemble founded by trumpeter/arranger David Weiss in 1996. NPR's Josh Jackson described them as "part New York hustle and part writer's workshop, all of it redolent with the aroma of newness." The title track of The Turning Gate won the group a Chamber Music Association grant.

== History ==
After meeting some of the musicians in 1996—pianist Xavier Davis, bassist Dwayne Burno, and drummer Nasheet Waits—David Weiss, who was working on arrangements for Freddie Hubbard, decided to form a self-determining cooperative ensemble, eventually deciding on an octet, leading to a search for wind players. The first musicians added to the group were Gregory Tardy, Myron Walden, and James Farnsworth. Farnsworth died after the release of their first recording, and the chair of baritone saxophone has been revolving — three others have filled the position since. Jimmy Greene who was a guest artist on the first album was a full member by the second, as were Steve Davis and Chris Karlic. The second album featured guest appearances by Craig Handy and Joe Chambers. Their third and most recent album, The Turning Gate added Norbert Stachel on baritone sax.

== Members ==
David Weiss (trumpet and fluglehorn)
Myron Walden (alto sax, flute)
Jimmy Greene (tenor sax, soprano sax, flute)
Steve Davis (trombone)
Norbert Stachel (baritone sax, bass clarinet)
Xavier Davis (piano)
Dwayne Burno (bass)
Nasheet Waits (drums)

=== Past members ===
Andrew Williams (trombone)
Danny Grissett (piano)
Gregory Tardy (tenor saxophone)
James Farnsworth (baritone sax)
Dave Rickenberg (baritone sax)
Chris Karlic (baritone sax)

=== Honorary members ===
Craig Handy (saxophone)
Joe Chambers (drums)

== Discography ==
- First Steps into Reality (Fresh Sound New Talent, 1998)
- Walkin' the Line (Fresh Sound New Talent, 2003)
- The Turning Gate (Motéma Music, 2008)

with Freddie Hubbard

- New Colors (Hip Bop, 2001)
- On the Real Side (Times Square, 2008)
