= Straight Up =

Straight up is a bartending term referring to a chilled drink served in a stemmed glass without ice.

Straight Up may also refer to:

- Straight Up (book), by author, blogger, physicist and climate expert Joseph J. Romm
- Straight Up (Harold Vick album), 1967
- Straight Up (Badfinger album), 1971
- Straight Up (Eric Alexander album), 1992
- Straight Up (Bob James album), 1996
- Straight Up (Jimmy McGriff album), 1998
- "Straight Up" (Paula Abdul song), 1988
- "Straight Up" (Chanté Moore song), 2000
- Straight Up (TV series), a Canadian television series
- Straight Up (1988 film), an anti-drug film
- Straight Up (2019 film), an independent film by James Sweeney
- The Straight Up, a documentary style of photography pioneered by Terry Jones

== See also ==
- Strait Up, 2000 album by Snot
