= Brian Blade =

American jazz drummer (born 1970)

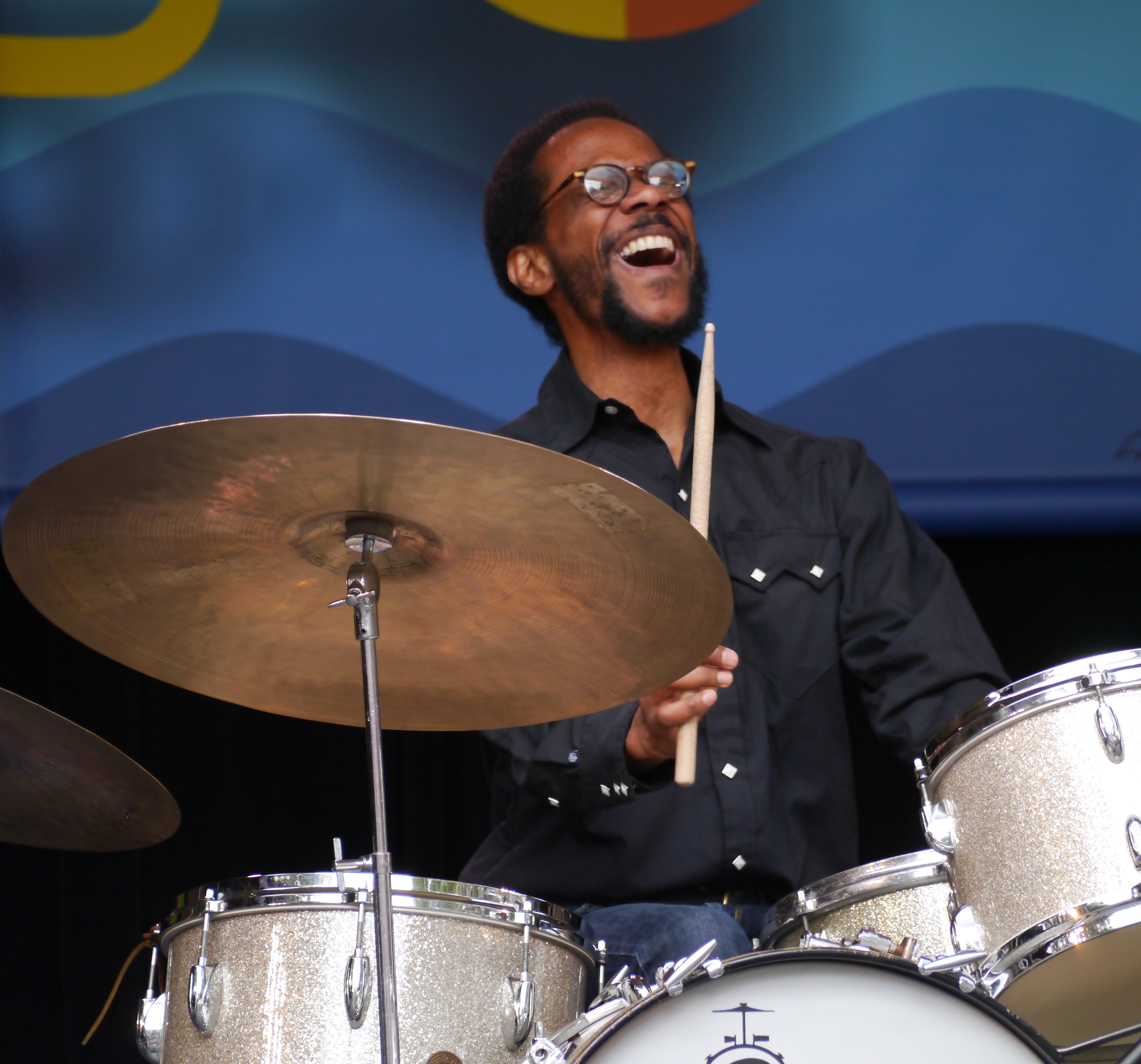
- Blade at the 2014 Monterey Jazz Festival

Background information
- Born: July 25, 1970 (age 56); Shreveport, Louisiana, U.S.
- Genre: Jazz
- Occupations: Musician, composer
- Instruments: Drums, percussion
- Labels: Nonesuch, Columbia, Verve, Blue Note, Warner Bros.
- Website: brianblade.com

"Landmarks" by Brian Blade and the Fellowship Band
From the 2014 album Landmarks

Brian Blade (born July 25, 1970) is an American jazz drummer, composer, and session musician.

== Early life ==
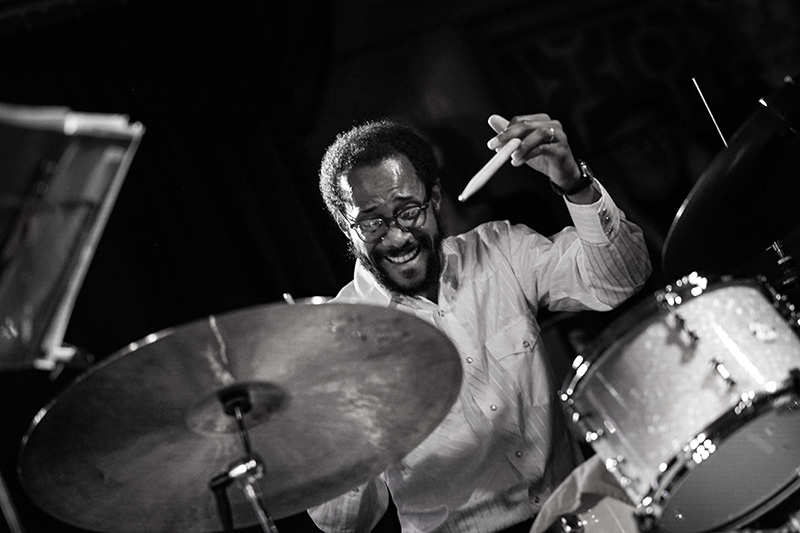
Brian Blade in Aarhus, Denmark 2017

Born and raised in Shreveport, Louisiana, Blade was exposed to gospel and praise music while attending Zion Baptist Church, at which his father, Brady L. Blade Sr., was pastor. Blade initially began learning violin and participated in the church choir, an experience that Blade later acknowledged was influential in his musical development. Following in the footsteps of his older brother, Brady Blade Jr., Blade developed skills on the drum kit while 'depping' for his brother in the church band. Soon after, Blade shifted his focus to the drums throughout middle and high school.

During high school, while studying with Dorsey Summerfield Jr., Blade began listening to the music of John Coltrane and Thelonious Monk, and became increasingly influenced by the drumming styles of Elvin Jones, Art Blakey, Papa Jo Jones, and Paul Motian. By the age of eighteen, Brian moved to New Orleans to attend Loyola University. From 1988 through 1993, he studied and played with most of the master musicians living in New Orleans, including Johnny Vidacovich, Ellis Marsalis, Steve Masakowski, Bill Huntington, Mike Pellera, John Mahoney, George French, Germaine Bazzle, David Lee Jr., Alvin Red Tyler, Tony Dagradi and Harold Battiste.

== Career ==
In 1992 Blade settled in New York and quickly cultivated a reputation as a 'first-call' drummer, including sideman work for Kenny Garrett, Mark Turner, and Joshua Redman. In 1997, Blade formed The Fellowship Band with pianist Jon Cowherd, bassist Chris Thomas, saxophonists Myron Walden and Melvin Butler, guitarist Jeff Parker, and pedal steel guitarist Dave Easley. The band released its debut album in 1998, Brian Blade Fellowship, and emerged as an innovative proponent of new jazz throughout subsequent decades.

Reviewing the ensemble's 2014 Landmarks album, John Kelman wrote:

As the Fellowship Band has grown, it has moved away from overt traditional references, even though they're an undercurrent throughout. Instead, as it explores milestones both inner and outer, Landmarks further speaks with the singular voice that the Fellowship Band has built upon since inception. Blending folkloric references, hints of church and spiritual concerns, jazz modality and countrified touchstones, Landmarks is the perfect name for Brian Blade & The Fellowship Band's fourth album; beyond its meaning to the group, it truly is yet another landmark recording in the core quintet's evolutionary travels. It may have come after a long gap in time, but that only makes it a wait all the more worthwhile.

While continuing his work with the Fellowship Band, Blade emerged as an ongoing member of Wayne Shorter's quartet, working with Shorter from 2000 until his death. Shorter's quartet, also featuring Danilo Pérez and John Patitucci, became widely revered by jazz critics for their "near-telepathic" musical symbiosis. Blade's creative contribution to Shorter's quartet was frequently considered a key component of the group's creativity. In addition to his collaborations with Wayne Shorter, Blade has remained an in-demand drummer for the likes of Joshua Redman, Brad Mehldau, Christian McBride, Chick Corea, Wolfgang Muthspiel, Joni Mitchell, Ellis Marsalis Jr., Billy Childs, Herbie Hancock, Norah Jones, among many others.

During his career Blade has often performed with artists in a range of musical styles, including Marianne Faithfull, Emmylou Harris, Bob Dylan, and Daniel Lanois. In 2009, Blade released Mama Rosa, his first album as a singer-songwriter, with songs dedicated to his grandmother and family. The live band includes Steven Nistor on drums.

On April 30, 2016, Blade played at the White House in Washington, D.C., as part of the International Jazz Day Global Concert.

== Honors ==
- 2013: ECHO Jazz Award "International Artist of the Year Drums/Percussion," for Quiver.
- 2013: Grammy Award for Best Jazz Instrumental Album for Trilogy (Concord), with Chick Corea.
- 2026: Grammy Nominations: Best Jazz Performance for Windows - Live, with Chick Corea & Christian McBride, and Best Jazz Instrumental Album for Spirit Fall.

== Equipment ==
Blade uses vintage Gretsch, Ludwig, Sonor and Slingerland drums. He plays Canopus drums when touring in Japan. He has used a variety of cymbals over the years, including multiple ride cymbals made by Roberto Spizzichino, vintage A Zildjians, and often a 22" Zildjian K Constantinople Light Ride (discontinued model). His acoustic guitar is a mid-1950s Gibson LG-3.

== Discography ==
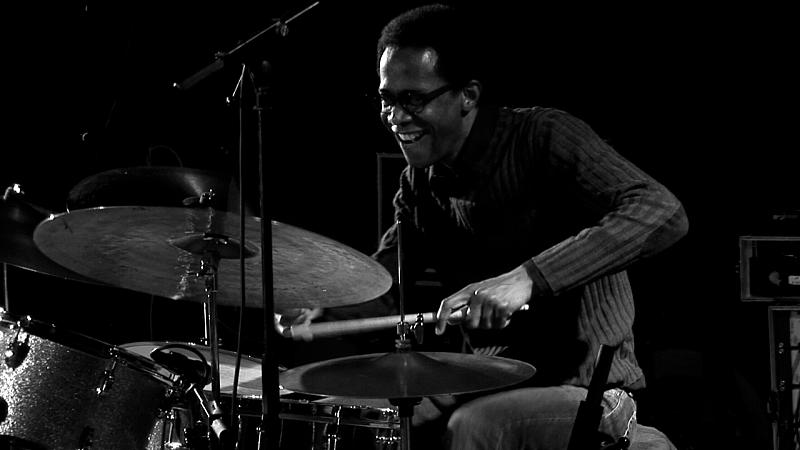
Blade at INNtöne Jazzfestival 2006

=== As leader ===
- Brian Blade Fellowship (Blue Note, 1998)
- Perceptual (Blue Note, 2000) – rec. 1999
- Season of Changes (Verve, 2008) – rec. 2007
- Mama Rosa (Verve Forecast, 2009) – rec. 2006, 2008
- Landmarks (Blue Note, 2014) – rec. 2010, 2013
- Body and Shadow (Blue Note, 2017)
- Live from the archives Bootleg June 15, 2000 Blues Alley Washington D.C. (Stoner Hill, 2022) – live rec. 2000
- Kings Highway (Stoner Hill, 2023) – rec. 2018
- Lifecycles Volumes I & II - Now! And Forevermore Honoring Bobby Hutcherson (Stoner Hill, 2023) – rec. 2018–2019

=== Collaborations ===
Quartet with Joshua Redman, Brad Mehldau and Christian McBride

- MoodSwing (Warner Bros., 1994)
- RoundAgain (Nonesuch, 2020) – rec. 2019
- LongGone (Nonesuch, 2022) – rec. 2007, 2019

Trio with Chick Corea and Christian McBride

- Trilogy (Concord, 2013) – Grammy Award for Best Jazz Instrumental Album
- Trilogy 2 (Concord, 2018) - Grammy Award for Best Jazz Instrumental Album
- Trilogy 3 (Candid Records, 2025) - Grammy Award for Best Jazz Performance for track "Windows - Live"

Trio with Wolfgang Muthspiel and Marc Johnson

- Real Book Stories (Quinton, 2001)
- Air, Love, and Vitamins (Quinton, 2004)

Duo with Wolfgang Muthspiel

- Friendly Travelers (Material, 2007)
- Friendly Travelers Live (Material, 2008)

Trio with Wolfgang Muthspiel and Scott Colley

- Angular Blues (ECM, 2020)

Trio with Edward Simon and Scott Colley

- Steel House (ArtistShare, 2015)
- Three Visitors (GroundUP Music, 2024)

Trio with Benjamin Koppel and Scott Colley

- Collective (ArtistShare, 2014)
- Perspective (Cowbell Music, 2023)

Trio with Benjamin Koppel and Anders Koppel

- Time Again (Cowbell Music, 2023) – rec. 2019

Trio with John Patitucci and André Marques

- Viva Hermeto (Borandá, 2014)

Trio with John Patitucci and Danilo Pérez

- Children of the Light (Mack Avenue, 2015)

Trio with Jeff Denson and Romain Pilon

- Between Two Worlds (Ridgeway, 2019)
- Finding Light (Ridgeway, 2022)

=== As a member ===
Yaya^{3}
Trio with Sam Yahel and Joshua Redman

- Yaya^{3} (Loma, 2002)

SFJAZZ Collective

- SFJazz Collective (Nonesuch, 2005) – rec. 2004

Black Dub
With Daniel Lanois, Trixie Whitley and Daryl Johnson

- Black Dub (Jive, 2010)

=== As sideman ===
With David Binney

- 2000: Afinidad with Edward Simon (Red, 2005)
- 2000: South (ACT, 2001)
- 2004?: Welcome to Life (Mythology, 2004)
- 2004: Océanos with Edward Simon (Criss Cross, 2007)
- 2008: Third Occasion (Mythology, 2009)
- 2010?: Graylen Epicenter (Mythology, 2011)

With Billy Childs

- Lyric: Jazz Chamber Music, Vol 1 (Artistshare, 2005)
- Autumn: In Moving Pictures: Jazz Chamber Music, Vol 2 (Artistshare, 2010)

With Kenny Garrett

- Black Hope (Warner Bros., 1992)
- Triology (Warner Bros., 1995)
- Pursuance: Music of John Coltrane (Warner Bros., 1996)
- Beyond the Wall (Nonesuch, 2006)

With Darrell Grant

- 1993: Black Art (Criss Cross, 1994)
- 1994: The New Bop (Criss Cross, 1995)
- Smokin' Java (Lair Hill, 1999)
- Truth and Reconciliation (Origin, 2007)[2CD]

With Norah Jones

- 2000–01: Come Away with Me (Blue Note, 2002)
- 2003–04: Feels Like Home (Blue Note, 2004)
- 2015: Day Breaks (Blue Note, 2016)
- 2018–19: Begin Again (Blue Note, 2019)
- 2019: Pick Me Up Off The Floor (Blue Note, 2020)

With Kiyoshi Kitagawa

- 2003: Ancestry (Atelier Sawano, 2004)
- 2005: Prayer (Atelier Sawano, 2005)
- 2005: Live at Tsutenkaku (Atelier Sawano, 2006)[DVD-Video] – live

With Daniel Lanois

- Shine (Anti-, 2003)
- Rockets (self-released, 2004)
- Belladonna (Anti-, 2005)
- Here Is What Is (Red Floor, 2007)
- Flesh And Machine (Anti-, 2014)

With Ron Miles

- 2011: Quiver (Yellowbird, 2012)
- 2013: Circuit Rider (Yellowbird, 2014)
- 2019: Rainbow Sign (Blue Note, 2020)

With Joni Mitchell

- 1997: Taming the Tiger (Reprise, 1998)
- 1998: Painting with Words and Music (Eagle Rock, 1998)[DVD-Video]
- 2002: Travelogue (Nonesuch, 2002)
- 2006–07: Shine (Hear Music, 2007)

With Wolfgang Muthspiel

- 2001: Real Book Stories (Quinton, 2001)
- 2013: Driftwood (ECM, 2014)
- 2016: Rising Grace (ECM, 2016)
- 2018: Angular Blues (ECM, 2020)

With John Patitucci

- Communion (Concord, 2001)
- Songs, Stories & Spirituals (Concord, 2003)
- Line by Line (JVC Victor/Concord, 2006)
- Remembrance (Concord, 2009)
- Viva Hermeto! (Borandá, 2014)
- Brooklyn (Three Faces, 2015)

With Joshua Redman

- MoodSwing (Warner Bros., 1994)
- Spirit of the Moment – Live at the Village Vanguard (Warner Bros., 1995) – live
- Freedom in the Groove (Warner Bros., 1996)
- Timeless Tales (for changing times) (Warner Bros., 1998)
- Elastic (Warner Bros., 2002)
- Momentum (Nonesuch, 2005)
- 2006: Back East (Nonesuch, 2007)
- 2008: Compass (Nonesuch, 2009)
- 2012: Walking Shadows (Nonesuch, 2013)
- 2017: Still Dreaming (Nonesuch, 2018)
- 2023: Where Are We (Blue Note, 2023)

With Wayne Shorter

- 2001: Footprints Live! (Verve, 2002) – live
- 2002?: Alegria (Verve, 2003)
- 2002–04: Beyond the Sound Barrier (Verve, 2005)
- 2010: Without a Net (Blue Note, 2013) – live
- 2016: Emanon (Blue Note, 2018)

With Edward Simon

- 2000: Afinidad with David Binney (Red, 2001)
- 2006: Unicity (CAM Jazz, 2006)
- 2008: Poesia (Cam Jazz, 2009)
- 2010: Trio Live in New York (Sunnyside, 2013) – live
- 2017: Sorrows & Triumphs (Sunnyside, 2018)

With Mark Turner

- 1995: Mark Turner (Warner Bros., 1998)
- 1998: In This World (Warner Bros., 1998)
- 1999: Ballad Session (Warner Bros., 2000)

With Kenny Werner

- Democracy (Half Note, 2006) – live
- Lawn Chair Society (Blue Note, 2007)

With others

- Brad Mehldau, Introducing Brad Mehldau (Warner Bros., 1995)
- Emmylou Harris, Wrecking Ball (Elektra, 1995)
- Steve Masakowski, Direct Axecess (Blue Note, 1995) – rec. 1994
- Jane Siberry, Maria (Reprise, 1995) – rec. 1994–1995
- Bob James Trio, Straight Up (Warner Bros., 1996) – recorded in 1995
- Bob Dylan, Time Out of Mind (Columbia, 1997) – rec. 1996–1997
- David Berkman, Handmade (Palmetto, 1998)
- Ryan Kisor, Battle Cry (Criss Cross, 1998) – rec. 1997
- Dianne Reeves, Bridges (Blue Note, 1999)
- Bill Frisell, The Sweetest Punch (Verve, 1999)
- Marianne Faithfull, Vagabond Ways (Instinct, 2000)
- Rebekka Bakken and Wolfgang Muthspiel, Daily Mirror (Material, 2000)
- Chris Potter, Gratitude (Verve, 2001) – recorded in 2000
- Ralph Bowen, Soul Proprietor (Criss Cross, 2001)
- Rick Margitza, Memento (Palmetto, 2001)
- Joe Henry, Scar (Mammoth, 2001) – rec. 2000
- Joel Weiskopf, Change in My Life (Criss Cross, 2002)
- David Berkman, Leaving Home (Palmetto, 2002)
- Charlie Haden, American Dreams (Verve, 2002)
- Herbie Hancock, Michael Brecker, and Roy Hargrove, Directions in Music: Live at Massey Hall (Verve, 2002) – live
- Danilo Pérez, ...Till Then (Verve, 2003)
- Lizz Wright, Salt (Verve, 2003) – rec. 2002
- Helen Sung, Push (Fresh Sound New Talent, 2004)
- Tim Ries, The Rolling Stones Project (Concord, 2005)
- Bob Lanois, Snake Road (Cordova Bay, 2006)
- Mike Holober, Wish List (Sons of Sound, 2006)
- Debbie Deane, Grove House (RKM Music, 2007)
- Sam Yahel, Truth and Beauty (Origin, 2007)
- Alyssa Graham, Echo (Sunnyside, 2008)
- Rebecca Martin, The Growing Season (Sunnyside, 2008)
- Scott Colley, Empire (Cam Jazz, 2010)
- John Scofield, A Moment's Peace (Emarcy, 2011)
- Laura Veirs, Tumble Bee: Laura Veirs Sings Folk Songs for Children (Bella Union, 2011)
- Beth Orton, Sugaring Season (Anti-, 2012)
- Rolf and Joachim Kühn Quartet, Lifeline (Boutique, 2012)
- Davy Mooney, Perrier Street (Sunnyside, 2012)
- Matt Lemmler's New Orleans Jazz Revival Band, Ubuntu (SMartist, 2012)
- Shawn Colvin, All Fall Down (Nonesuch, 2012)
- Iron & Wine, Ghost on Ghost (4AD, 2013)
- Laura Veirs, Warp and Weft (Bella Union, 2013)
- Aga Zaryan, Remembering Nina & Abbey (Parlophone, 2013)
- Jon Cowherd, Mercy (ArtistShare, 2013)
- Antonio Sánchez, Birdman (Milan, 2014)
- Billy Childs, Map to the treasure: Reimagining Laura Nyro (Sony, 2014)
- Jenny Scheinman, The Littlest Prisoner (Sony Masterworks, 2014)
- Sarah McLachlan, Shine On (Verve, 2014)
- Joe Jackson, Fast Forward (Caroline, 2015)
- Joel Harrison 5, Spirit House (Whirlwind, 2015) – rec. 2013
- Sadao Watanabe, Re-Bop (Victor, 2017)
- Debbie Deane, Red Ruby Stars (Modern Icon Recordings/Ropeadope, 2021)
- Charles Lloyd, The Sky Will Still Be There Tomorrow (Blue Note, 2024)
- Chris Potter, Eagle's Point (Edition, 2024) – rec. 2022
- John Patitucci, Spirit Fall (Edition, 2025)
