= Freedom & Surrender =

Studio album by Lizz Wright
- Released: September 4, 2015
- Recorded: n.d.
- Studio: The Village Studios and Strange Cargo, Los Angeles, CA
- Genre: Jazz; gospel
- Label: Concord
- Producer: Larry Klein

Lizz Wright chronology
| Fellowship (2010) | Freedom & Surrender (2015) | Grace (2017) |

Freedom & Surrender is the fifth album by American singer Lizz Wright. It was her sole album for Concord Records and released on September 4, 2015.

== Band and repertoire ==
Larry Klein produced the album, who brought guitarist Dean Parks and Vinnie Colaiuta on drums as part of a small band, which consistently backs Wright throughout this recording. Keyboardist (and composer) Kenny Banks worked with Wright since her debut album Salt.

"Initially supposed to be a disc of mostly cover-songs, centered on themes of 'the circuitous dance of love'", most of the songs finally were written by Wright and Klein with David Batteau, two with Jesse Harris, and another with JD Souther, "Right Where You Are", which features a duet by Wright with Gregory Porter. Till Brönner plays flugelhorn on Nick Drake's "River Man". The second and more unfamiliar pop song Wright covers, "To Love Somebody" by the Bee Gees, "has some gospel happening in it". "Freedom" and "Surrender", the first and the closing track on the album were penned by long-time collaborator Toshi Reagon.

== Reception ==
Metascore gave the album an overall score of 75/100, based on five "generally favorable" reviews. Mojo found it "unequivocally [...] her best album yet." Looking back at her previous work, Nate Chinen writes in the New York Times, that "her poise, it seemed, came with a higher purpose." With this album "Ms. Wright has found a new sensual register as an artist," and cited a line from the song "The New Game": "Ain't no shame shifting gears." Chinen described the album's sound as "slicker and punchier than Ms. Wright's previous standard, with an ace studio band," and prefers the songs by Toshi Reagon as "most evocative" and some others over "River Man", that would "verge[] on soothing schmaltz." Ann Powers from NPR Music however picked Wright's version of the Nick Drake classic for Songs We Love, also recognizing the whole album as "very romantic, spiritually inquisitive." Andy Kellman closes his review on Allmusic stating "It's doubtful that Wright and her creative partners could have more effectively synthesized her past work with her current outlook."

== Track listing ==
1. "Freedom" (Toshi Reagon) – 5:05
2. "The Game" (Jesse Harris, Lizz Wright) – 2:56
3. "The New Game" (David Batteau, Larry Klein, Wright) – 3:26
4. "Lean In" (Harris, Klein, Wright) – 5:20
5. "Right Where You Are" (JD Souther, Klein, Wright) – 5:25
6. "River Man" (Nick Drake) – 5:32
7. "Somewhere Down the Mystic" (Batteau, Klein, Wright) – 5:27
8. "Real Life Painting" (Wright, Maia Sharp) – 3:34
9. "To Love Somebody" (Barry Gibb, Maurice Gibb, Robin Gibb) – 5:06
10. "Here and Now" (Batteau, Klein, Wright) – 4:28
11. "You" (Batteau, Klein, Wright) – 5:15
12. "Blessed the Brave" (Batteau, Klein, Wright) – 3:39
13. "Surrender" (Wright, Toshi Reagon) – 6:07

== Personnel ==
- Lizz Wright - vocals, background vocals
- Kenny Banks - Fender Rhodes (tracks 1, 3, 4), Wurlitzer (2, 5, 7, 8), piano (2, 5, 9), Hammond B-3 (13)
- Pete Kuzma - Hammond B-3 (1–9, 11), Fender Rhodes (10), Wurlitzer (12, 13)
- Dean Parks - Electric guitar, mandolin (2, 7), acoustic guitar (4, 7, 8), bazouki (7)
- Dan Lutz - Bass
- Vinnie Colaiuta - Drums
- Pete Korpula - Percussion (1–5, 7–9)
- Larry Klein - Funk Box app (4, 11), keyboards (4, 5, 11), acoustic guitar (7)
- Jesse Harris - nylon string guitar (2)
- Gregory Porter - vocals (5)
- Till Brönner - flugelhorn (6)
- Billy Childs - Fender Rhodes (10)

Production

- Larry Klein - Producer
- Lynne Earls - Recording engineer (at The Village Studios and Strange Cargo, Los Angeles, CA)
- Alex Williams - Assistant engineer
- Tim Palmer - Mix (at '62 Studios, Austin, TX)
- Travis Kennedy - Assistant mix engineer
- Bernie Grundman - Mastering (at Bernie Grundman Mastering, Hollywood, CA)
