= Jon Cowherd =

- Born: Kentucky, United States
- Genres: Jazz, post-bop, pop, rock
- Occupations: Pianist, composer, arranger, producer
- Instrument: Piano
- Website: joncowherd.com

Jon Cowherd is an American pianist, composer, arranger, and record producer. Cowherd is most well known for his partnership with jazz drummer Brian Blade, with whom he co-founded the Brian Blade Fellowship. When not recording and touring with the Fellowship, Cowherd works extensively with a broad array of players and singers from the jazz, pop and rock worlds.

== Biography ==
Cowherd was born and raised in Kentucky. Born to a trombone player (father) and classically trained violinist (mother), both of whom were also educators, Cowherd began piano lessons at the age of five and trumpet and violin lessons at ten years of age. Cowherd began music at an early age singing, playing the piano, French horn and violin. He moved to New Orleans to attend Loyola University, where he studied jazz piano and improvisation under Ellis Marsalis, John Mahoney, and Steve Masakowski.

The Brian Blade Fellowship album Season of Changes was released around 2008. Cowherd also worked with Brian Blade in his debut singer-songwriter album Mama Rosa, which was released in 2009 on Verve Records.

As a producer, Cowherd has overseen albums by Lizz Wright, Alyssa Graham and The Local NYC.

Cowherd's debut album as a leader, Mercy, was released in 2013 on ArtistShare. It features Brian Blade, John Patitucci, and Bill Frisell. Reviewing the album for allaboutjazz, John Kelman wrote: "With music this well-conceived and a band so telepathically connected, it may have taken Cowherd a long time to release an album under his own name, but with Mercy as the result, it's been well worth the wait; hopefully there won't be such a long one for the follow-up."

== Discography ==
=== As leader ===
- Mercy (2013, ArtistShare)
- Pride & Joy (2023)

=== As a co-leader ===
With Brian Blade Fellowship

- Brian Blade Fellowship (1998, Blue Note Records)
- Perceptual (2000, Blue Note Records)
- Season of Changes (2008, Verve Records)
- Landmarks (2014, Blue Note Records)
- Body and Shadow (2017, Blue Note Records)
- Kings Highway (2023, Stoner Hill Records)

=== As sideman ===
- Meg Okura: Peace In My Heart (1995)
- Swing: The Original Broadway Cast Recording (1999)
- Mark Olson and the Creek Dippers: Zola and the Tulip Tree (2000)
- Steve Sacks: Look to the Sky (2001)
- Ari Ambrose: Waiting (2003, SteepleChase Records)
- Liz Wright: Salt (2003, Verve Records)
- The Local: Just Show Up (2004, Budron Records)
- Marshall Gilkes: Edenderry (2005, Alternate Side Records)
- Kingsborough Hymns: (2005)
- Jack Wilkins: Until It's Time (2005, Maxjazz)
- Metta Quintet: Subway Songs (2006, Sunnyside Records)
- Mariel Larsen: Mariel Larsen (2007, Coco Jazz)
- Chris Tarry: Sorry to be Strange (2007)
- Nicolas Thys: Virgo (2008, Pirouette Records)
- Myron Walden: In This World (2008, Demi Sound Records)
- Marshall Gilkes: Lost Words (2008, Alternate Side Records)
- Pamela Luss: Your Eyes (2008, Savant)
- Alyssa Graham: Echo (2008, Sunnyside Records/Walrus)
- Brian Blade: Mama Rosa (2009, Verve Records)
- Matt Lemler: New Orleans Revival Project (2009)
- Iggy Pop: Préliminaires (2009, EMI)
- Marcus Strickland: Open Reel Deck (Strick Muzik, 2009)
- Rosanne Cash: We Three Kings (2010, Blue Note Records)
- Marc Cohn: Listening Booth 1970 (2010, Saguaro Road Records)
- Chrissi Poland: Songs From the Concrete (2010, Danben Records)
- Kevin Kinney: Good Country Mile (2011)
- Davy Mooney: Perrier Street (2011, Sunnyside Records)
- Maria Logis: Room for Something New (2012)
- Cassandra Wilson: Coming Forth by Day (Legacy, 2015)
