= Salt (Lizz Wright album) =

Studio album by Lizz Wright
- Released: 13 May 2003
- Recorded: August & December 2002
- Studio: Right Track Studios, New York, NY
- Genre: Jazz, soul
- Length: 50:30
- Label: Verve
- Producer: Tommy LiPuma, Brian Blade, Jon Cowherd

Lizz Wright chronology
| Salt (2003) | Dreaming Wide Awake (2005) |

Professional ratings
Review scores
| Source | Rating |
|---|---|
| All About Jazz | (favourable) |
| AllMusic | 3/5 stars |
| Vibe | 4/5 stars |
| Washington Post | (favourable) |

Salt is the first album by singer and composer Lizz Wright, released in 2003 on Verve Records. The album reached No. 2 on the Billboard Top Contemporary Jazz chart and No. 4 on the Billboard Top Jazz Albums chart.

== Track listing ==
1. "Open Your Eyes, You Can Fly" (Chick Corea, Neville Potter) – 5:07
2. "Salt" (Lizz Wright) – 3:25
3. "Afro Blue" (Mongo Santamaria, Oscar Brown Jr.) – 5:51
4. "Soon as I Get Home" (Charlie Smalls) – 4:26
5. "Walk with Me, Lord" (traditional) – 4:06
6. "Eternity" (Wright) – 3:35
7. "Goodbye" (Gordon Jenkins) – 3:57
8. "Vocalise/End of the Line" (Sergey Rachmaninoff/Cynthia Medley, John Edmonson) – 4:33
9. "Fire" (Wright) – 4:15
10. "Blue Rose" (Kenny Banks, Wright) – 4:06
11. "Lead the Way" (Brian Blade) – 4:23
12. "Silence" (Wright) – 2:42

== Personnel ==
- Lizz Wright – vocals
- Jon Cowherd – piano (tracks 4, 6, 8, 9, 11), Fender Rhodes (4, 7, 10, 11), arrangement (1, 6–10), horn arrangement (2)
- Kenneth Banks – Fender Rhodes (1, 3), Hammond organ (2, 5, 9), piano (2, 10), arrangement (5, 10)
- John Hart - guitar (1–7, 9, 11), acoustic guitar (8, 10), arrangement (9)
- Doug Weiss – bass (exc. 12), arrangement (9)
- Brian Blade – drums (1, 4–11), acoustic guitar (12), arrangement (3, 7, 9, 12)
- Jeff Haynes – percussion (1, 3–9, 11)

plus

- Sam Yahel – Hammond organ (1)
- Danilo Pérez – piano (3)
- Myron Walden – alto saxophone (2, 3, 11), bass clarinet (11)
- Derrick Gardner – trumpet (2, 3)
- Vincent Gardner – trombone (2, 3)
- Terreon Gully – drums (2, 3)
- Monte Croft – vibraphone (4), marimba (8)
- String section arranged and conducted by Jon Cowherd (6, 8, 10)
  - Sarah Adams, Ronald Carbone, Crystal Garner – viola
  - Ellen Westerman (soloist on 8), Joe Kimura, Caryl Paisner, Mark Orrin Shuman – cello
- Chris Potter – soprano saxophone (7)
- Adam Rogers – acoustic, electric and bottleneck guitar (12)

Production

- Tommy LiPuma, Brian Blade, Jon Cowherd - production
- Joe Ferla - recording
- Andrew Felluss, Chris Fama, David Perini, Jason Stasium - second engineers
- Al Schmidt - mixing
- Steve Genewick - mixing assistant
- Doug Sax and Robert Hadley - mastering
- Hollis King - art direction
- Rika Ichiki - design
- Bill Phelps - photography
