= Kevin Hays =

American jazz pianist and composer (born 1968)

- Born: May 1, 1968 (age 58); New York City, New York, US
- Genre: Jazz
- Occupations: Musician, composer
- Instrument: Piano
- Years active: 1985–present
- Labels: SteepleChase, Blue Note, Smoke Sessions
- Website: kevinhays.com

Kevin Hays (born May 1, 1968) is an American jazz pianist and composer. He began playing in New York while still at high school and led his first record date in 1990. He has recorded more than twenty albums as leader or co-leader, including three each for SteepleChase and Blue Note Records. He led a long-standing trio with bassist Doug Weiss and drummer Bill Stewart, and has also sung with his New Day Trio of bassist Rob Jost and drummer Greg Joseph.

== Early life ==
Hays was born in New York City on May 1, 1968, the youngest of four children. He was raised in Greenwich, Connecticut, and began studying the piano at the age of six, after hearing his father, an amateur player. He was initially interested in rock music and other things that he heard on the radio, and became more interested in jazz in his early teens. Initially self-taught, Hays later had lessons with Lou Stein, and attended several Interlochen Music Camps. Hays played locally from 1982.

== Later life and career ==
Hays started playing in New York in 1985, while still at high school. He then had a period in Nick Brignola's band, and attended the Manhattan School of Music for a semester in 1986 before dropping out to concentrate on performing. His debut recording as a leader came in 1990, for the Japanese label Jazz City. Several of the tracks on this album, El Matador, were his own compositions. During 1991 to 1993, he also recorded three albums for SteepleChase Records.

"Hays played regularly with a number of Bob Belden's ensembles from the late 1980s, and in the 1990s he toured Japan and recorded with the Harper Brothers (1990) and worked with Steve Wilson, Benny Golson (from c. 1990), Joshua Redman's quartet (1992), Seamus Blake (from 1993), and Eddie Henderson (from 1994)." After the SteepleChase albums, he signed to Blue Note Records, who released three of his albums. In 1995 Hays toured with saxophonist Sonny Rollins.

Hays's trio, with Doug Weiss (bass) and Bill Stewart (drums), played together for 15 years. Hays also recorded albums under Stewart's leadership in the 2000s. In 2010–11, Hays performed and recorded duets with pianist Brad Mehldau. Also in 2011, Variations, a solo piano album that included interpretations of Robert Schumann, was released by Pirouet Records. Hays formed the New Day Trio, with Rob Jost on bass and Greg Joseph on drums, and also sang on their first release, New Day. This was followed around a year later by North. Hope, a duo album with Lionel Loueke, was released around 2017.

== Playing style ==
"Hays has a linear style and a strong harmonic sense, and uses the pedal to produce a clipped sound, recalling the early work of Paul Bley."

== Discography ==
=== As leader/co-leader ===
Year recorded	Title	Label	Year released	Personnel/Notes
1990	El Matador	Jazz City	1991	Some tracks quartet, with Steve Wilson (alto sax, soprano sax), Scott Colley (bass), Bill Stewart (drums); some tracks quintet, with Joe Henderson (tenor sax) added; reissued by Evidence
1991	SweetEar	SteepleChase	1991	Quintet, with Eddie Henderson (trumpet), Vincent Herring (soprano sax, alto sax), James Genus (bass), Joe Chambers (drums)
1991	Ugly Beauty	SteepleChase	1992	Trio, with Larry Grenadier (bass), Jeff Williams (drums)
1992	Crossroad	SteepleChase	1993	Quintet, with Scott Wendholt (trumpet, flugelhorn), Freddie Bryant (guitar), Dwayne Burno (bass), Carl Allen (drums)
1994	7th Sense	Blue Note	1994	Quintet, with Seamus Blake (soprano sax, tenor sax), Steve Nelson (vibes), Doug Wiess (bass), Brian Blade (drums)
1995?	Go Round	Blue Note	1995	Sextet, with Seamus Blake (soprano sax, tenor sax), Steve Hall (tenor sax), Doug Wiess (bass), Billy Hart (drums), Daniel Sadownick (percussion)
1996	Andalucia	Blue Note	1997	Trio, with Ron Carter (bass), Jack DeJohnette (drums)
2001	What Survives	PinonDisk	2010	Trio, with Doug Weiss (bass), Bill Stewart (drums)
2003	Fear of Roaming	Fresh Sound	2004	As Sangha Quartet; quartet, with Seamus Blake (tenor sax), Larry Grenadier (bass), Bill Stewart (drums)
2004	Piano Works III: Open Range	ACT	2005	Solo piano; Hays sings on one track; one track has sampled singers
2004	One Little Song	(not on label)	2006	Duo, co-led with Eli Degibri (tenor sax, soprano sax)
2005	For Heaven's Sake	Jazz Eyes	2005	Trio, with Doug Weiss (bass), Bill Stewart (drums)
2006	The Dreamer	Artist Share	2007	With Hilary Smith (vocals), Doug Weiss (bass), Bill Stewart (drums)
2007	You've Got a Friend	Jazz Eyes	2009	Trio, with Doug Weiss (bass), Bill Stewart (drums)
2008	Live at Smalls	Smalls Live	2008	Trio, with Doug Weiss (bass), Bill Stewart (drums); in concert
2009	Dawning	Palmetto	2013	As Saffron; quintet, with Katayoun Goudarzi (vocals), Tim Ries (tenor sax, soprano sax, bass clarinet, Hungarian folk flute), Shujaat Khan (sitar, vocals), Abhiman Kaushal (tabla)
2010	Variations	Pirouet	2011	Solo piano
2010	Modern Music	Nonesuch	2011	Duo, co-led with Brad Mehldau (piano)
2014	New Day	Sunnyside	2015	With Tony Scherr (electric guitar, acoustic bass), Gregoire Maret (harmonica), Rob Jost (electric bass, bass), Greg Joseph (drums, percussion)
2016	North	Sunnyside	2016	Trio, with Rob Jost (bass, ukulele), Greg Joseph (drums)
2016	Hope	Newvelle (France) / Edition (UK)	2017	Duo, with Lionel Loueke (guitar, vocals)
2018	Where Are You	Fresh Sound	2019	Trio, with Marc Miralta (drums), Mark Turner (tenor sax)
2019?	Across The Sea	Via Veneto Jazz	2019	Duo, with Chiara Izzi (composer, vocals)
2020	All Things Are	Smoke Sessions	2021	Trio, with Ben Street (bass), Billy Hart (drums)
2023	Bridges	Smoke Sessions	2023	Trio, with Ben Street (bass), Billy Hart (drums)

=== As sideman ===
With Bob Belden

- Straight to My Heart: The Music of Sting (Blue Note, 1991)
- Puccini's Turandot (Blue Note, 1993)
- When the Doves Cry: The Music of Prince (Blue Note, 1994)
- Shades of Blue (Blue Note, 1996)
- Strawberry Fields (Blue Note, 1996)
- Tapestry (Blue Note, 1997)
- Black Dahlia (Blue Note, 2001)
- Three Days of Rain (Sunnyside, 2006)

With Steve Gadd

- 2017: Steve Gadd Band (Victor, 2018)
- 2019: At Blue Note Tokyo (Victor, 2021) – live

With Benny Golson

- 1991: Domingo (Dreyfus, 1992)
- 1996: Up Jumped Benny (Arkadia Jazz, 1997) – live

With Eddie Henderson

- Inspiration (Milestone, 1995) – rec. 1994
- Dark Shadows (Milestone, 1996)
- Dreams of Gershwin (Key Stone, 1998)
- Reemergence (Sharp Nine, 1999)
- Oasis (Sirocco, 2001)
- Precious Moment (Kind of Blue, 2006)

With Chris Potter

- 1992: Presenting Chris Potter (Criss Cross Jazz, 1993)
- 1993: Sundiata (Criss Cross Jazz, 1995)
- 2000: This Will Be (Storyville, 2001) – live
- 2000: Gratitude (Verve, 2001)
- 2002: Traveling Mercies (Verve, 2002)
- 2002: Lift: Live at the Village Vanguard (Sunnyside, 2004)

With others

- Jeff Ballard, Fairgrounds (Edition, 2018)
- Ricardo Grilli, 1962 (Tone Rogue)
- Vincent Herring, Dawnbird (Landmark, 1993)
- Joshua Redman, Joshua Redman (Warner Bros, 1993)
- Mark Turner and Tad Shull, Two Tenor Ballads (Criss Cross Jazz, 2000)
