= Somewhere Over the Rainbow (Harold Mabern album) =

Studio album by Harold Mabern
- Released: 2006
- Recorded: November 11, 2005
- Studio: The Studio, New York
- Genre: Jazz
- Label: Venus
- Producer: Tetsuo Hara, Todd Barkan

Harold Mabern chronology
| Fantasy (2004) | Somewhere Over the Rainbow (2006) | Misty (2007) |

Professional ratings
Review scores
| Source | Rating |
|---|---|
| AllMusic | 4/5 stars |

Somewhere Over the Rainbow is an album by pianist Harold Mabern. It was recorded in 2005 and released by Venus Records.

== Recording ==
The album was recorded on November 11, 2005, at The Studio in New York. It was produced by Tetsuo Hara and Todd Barkan. The performers were Harold Mabern (piano), Dwayne Burno (bass), and Willie Jones III (drums).

== Music and release ==
All of the compositions are by Harold Arlen. Mabern commented that, "I've always studied him because his music is very bluesy. And you don't really have to do anything to his music but just go ahead and play it." Jones uses brushes on most of the tracks. "A Sleeping Bee" gets a "gospel-inflected soul-jazz treatment". "This Time the Dream's on Me" has "a hip Latin vamp to introduce a soul-jazz-infused arrangement". Mabern's arrangement of "Savannah" begins as a calypso and then shifts into hard bop. Somewhere Over the Rainbow was released by Venus Records.

== Track listing ==
1. "Somewhere Over the Rainbow"
2. "A Sleeping Bee"
3. "Blues in the Night"
4. "Out of This World"
5. "Savanna"
6. "Hooray for Love"
7. "Stormy Weather"
8. "I've Got the World on a String"
9. "Man That Got Away"
10. "This Time The Dream's on Me"

== Personnel ==
- Harold Mabern – piano
- Dwayne Burno – bass
- Willie Jones III – drums
