= This Will Be (album) =

Live album by Chris Potter
- Released: August 7, 2001
- Recorded: March 9–12, 2000
- Venue: Jazzpar 2000 Concerts at Jive in Vejle, Værket in Randers and SAS Falkoner Center in Copenhagen, Denmark
- Genre: Jazz
- Length: 74:13
- Label: Storyville; 1014245

Chris Potter chronology
Vertigo (1998)	This Will Be (2001)	Gratitude (2001)

This Will Be (subtitled The Jazzpar Prize) is the first live album by jazz saxophonist Chris Potter, recorded at concerts in Denmark celebrating his receipt of the 2000 Jazzpar Prize and released on the Danish Storyville label in 2001.

== Reception ==
Professional ratings
Review scores
Source	Rating
Allmusic	4.5/5 stars
The Penguin Guide to Jazz Recordings	3/4 stars

The AllMusic review by Ken Dryden awarded the album 4 1/2 stars stating "With all of the attention that multi-instrumentalist Chris Potter began getting at the dawn of the 21st century in his homeland of the U.S., he had already been awarded the Jazzpar Prize in 2000, with part of the honor including this special concert recording made to feature his work ... this young man (not yet 30 at the time) displays tremendous chops on tenor sax and the skills of a seasoned composer and arranger ... well worth acquiring by post-bop fans."

== Track listing ==
All compositions by Chris Potter

1. "This Will Be" − 11:54
2. "Okinawa" − 11:24
3. "Jazzpar Suite: Part One - Chorale" − 1:55
4. "Jazzpar Suite: Part Two - Medium" − 10:57
5. "Jazzpar Suite: Part Three - Rubato" − 6:29
6. "Jazzpar Suite: Part Four - Tribute to Hodges & Ellington" − 7:12
7. "Jazzpar Suite: Part Five - Ballad" − 3:37
8. "Jazzpar Suite: Part Six - Folk Tune" − 10:25
9. "In a Sentimental Mood (Encore)" (Duke Ellington) − 8:28

== Personnel ==
- Chris Potter – soprano saxophone, tenor saxophone, flute, bass clarinet
- Kasper Tranberg − cornet (tracks 3–8)
- Peter Fuglsang − flute, bass clarinet (tracks 3–8)
- Kevin Hays – piano
- Jacob Fischer − guitar (tracks 3–8)
- Scott Colley − bass
- Billy Drummond – drums
