= Dwayne Burno =

American jazz bassist

Dwayne Allen Burno
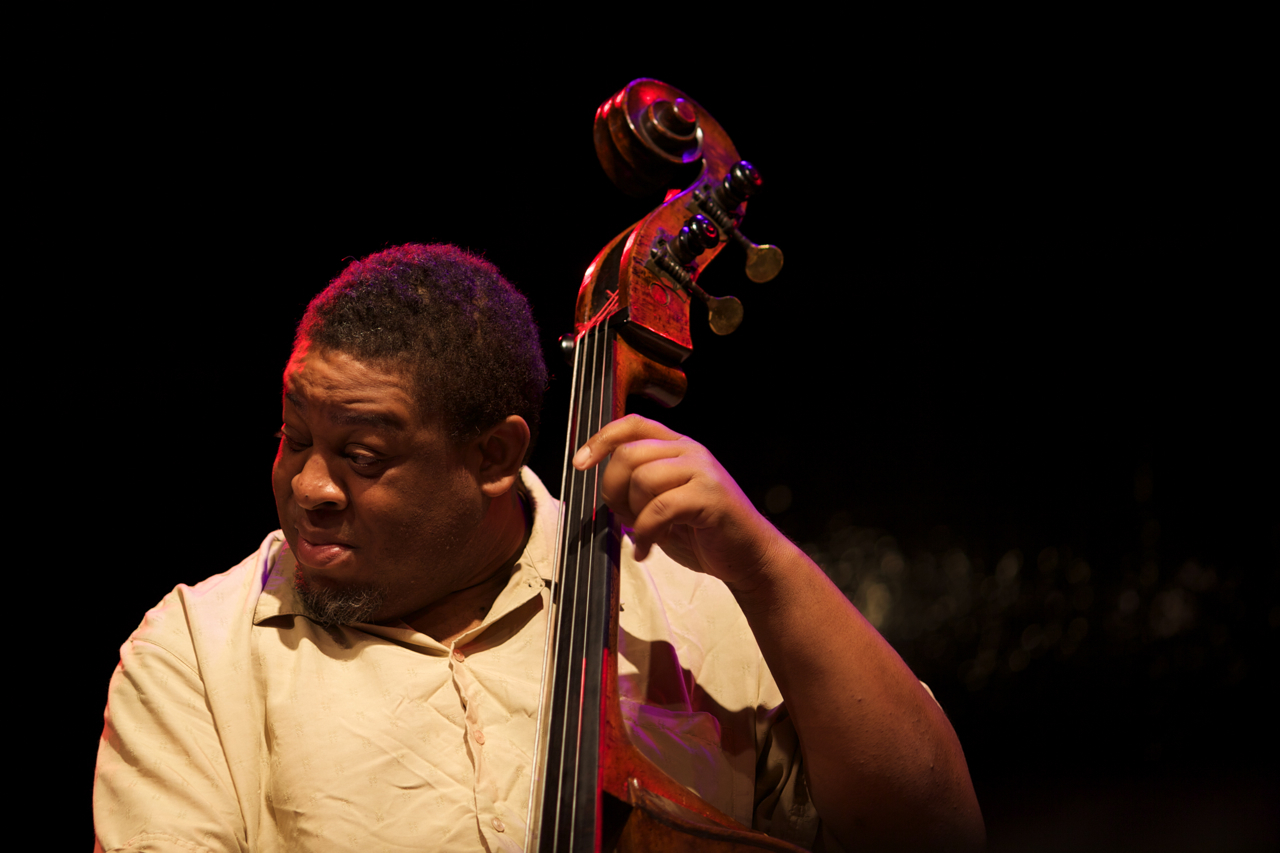
- At Punta del Este jazz festival in 2010.

Background information
- Born: June 10, 1970; Philadelphia, Pennsylvania, US
- Died: December 28, 2013 (aged 43) New York City, US
- Genres: Jazz, post-bop
- Occupations: Musician, composer
- Instrument: Double bass
- Years active: 1989–2013

Dwayne Allen Burno (June 10, 1970 – December 28, 2013) was an American jazz bassist born in Philadelphia, Pennsylvania who became a first-call musician on the New York City jazz scene.

== Biography ==
Dwayne Burno began playing bass at the age of 16, attended the Berklee College of Music for three semesters beginning in 1988, and played professionally in 1989 with Donald Harrison. By 1990, Burno was twenty years old and living in New York City working as a member of Betty Carter’s backing trio. Over time he recorded and performed with many major figures in jazz, including Junior Cook, Orrin Evans, Herbie Hancock, Joe Henderson, Clifford Jordan, Abbey Lincoln, Wynton Marsalis, Ronnie Mathews, Mulgrew Miller, David Murray, Greg Osby, Nicholas Payton, Wallace Roney, Steve Turre, Chucho Valdés, and Cedar Walton. He also led his own quintet which played regularly at Smalls Jazz Club. Diagnosed with kidney disease in 2004, Burno had a kidney transplant in 2010, and died on December 28, 2013, at the age of 43. Two days before his death, Burno played his last gig at Smalls on December 26 with Peter Bernstein, Steve Nelson, and Billy Drummond. He was survived by his wife Wendy and their son Quinn.

== Discography ==
With Eric Alexander

- Man With A Horn (Milestone, 1999)

With Carl Allen

- The Dark Side of Dewey (Evidence, 1993)

With William Ash

- The Phoenix (Smalls, 2004)

With Don Braden

- The Voice of the Saxophone (RCA, 1997)
- Fire Within (RCA, 1999)
- Brighter Days (HighNote, 2001)

With Marc Cary

- Cary On (Enja, 1995)

With Sharel Cassity

- Relentless (Jazz Legacy Productions, 2009)

With Joe Chambers

- The Outlaw (Savant, 2006)
- Horace to Max (Savant, 2010)
- Moving Pictures Orchestra (Savant, 2012)

With George Colligan

- Activism (SteepleChase, 1996)
- Newcomer (SteepleChase, 1997)

With Ravi Coltrane

- Tenor Conclave: A Tribute to Hank Mobley (Evidence, 1997)

With Stanley Cowell

- Hear Me One (SteepleChase, 1997)

With Jesse Davis

- As We Speak (Concord Jazz, 1992)
- Young at Art (Concord Jazz, 1993)

With Steve Davis

- Meant to Be (Criss Cross Jazz, 2004)

With Xavier Davis

- The Dance of Life (Metropolitan, 1999)

With Dena DeRose

- Another World (Sharp Nine, 1999)

With Digable Planets

- Blowout Comb (Pendulum/EMI, 1994)

With Mike DiRubbo

- Keep Steppin' (Criss Cross Jazz, 2001)
- New York Accent (Cellar Live, 2007)
- Repercussion (Positone, 2009)

With Johannes Enders

- Bright Nights (Enja, 1998)

With Duane Eubanks

- Second Take (TCB, 2001)

With Taeko Fukao

- One Love (Flat Nine, 2007)

With David Gibson

- Maya (Nagel Heyer, 2002)
- The Path to Delphi (Nagel Heyer, 2005)
- G-Rays (Nagel Heyer, 2008)

With Greg Gisbert

- Harcology (Criss Cross Jazz, 1992)

With Benny Golson

- Up Jumped Benny (Arkadia Jazz, 1997)
- Tenor Legacy (Arkadia Jazz, 1996 [1998])
- One Day, Forever (Arkadia Jazz, 1996 [2001])

With Jimmy Greene

- Brand New World (RCA, 2000)

With Tom Guarna

- Major Minor (SteepleChase, 2009)

With Roy Hargrove

- Nothing Serious (Verve, 2006)

With Philip Harper

- "Soulful Sin" (Muse, 1993)

With Stefon Harris

- A Cloud of Red Dust (Blue Note, 1998)

With Donald Harrison

- Full Circle (Sweet Basil Records, 1990)
- Funky New Orleans (Metro, 2000) with Dr. John
- New Orleans Gumbo (Candid, 2013) with Dr. John

With Roy Haynes

- Praise (Disques Dreyfus, 1998)

With Kevin Hays

- Crossroad (SteepleChase, 1995)

With David Hazeltine

- Blues Quarters, Vol. 1 (Criss Cross Jazz, 2000)

With Todd Herbert

- The Path to Infinity (Metropolitan, 2007)
- The Tree of Life (Metropolitan, 2008)

With Vincent Herring

- Dawnbird (Landmark, 1993)

With John Hicks

- Cry Me a River (Venus, 1997)

With Freddie Hubbard

- New Colors (Hip Bop Essence, 2001)
- On the Real Side (Times Square, 2008)

With Bobby Hutcherson

- For Sentimental Reasons (Kind of Blue, 2007)

With Ingrid Jensen

- Here on Earth (Enja, 1997)

With Randy Johnston

- Is It You? (HighNote, 2005)

With Willie Jones, III

- Vol. 3 (WJ3, 2006)

With Peter Leitch

- Blues on the Corner (Reservoir, 2000)
- Autobiography (Reservoir, 2004)

With Brian Lynch

- Brian Lynch meets Bill Charlap (Sharp Nine, 2004)

With Harold Mabern

- Somewhere Over the Rainbow (Venus Jazz, 2005)

With Joe Magnarelli

- Live at Smalls (SmallsLIVE, 2013)

With The New Jazz Composers Octet

- First Steps into Reality (Fresh Sound New Talent, 1999)
- Walkin’ the Line (Fresh Sound New Talent, 2003)
- The Turning Gate (Motéma, 2008)

With Jeremy Pelt

- November (MAXJAZZ, 2008)
- Men of Honor (HighNote, 2010)
- The Talented Mr. Pelt (HighNote, 2011)
- Soul (HighNote, 2012)

With Luis Perdomo

- Links (Criss Cross Jazz, 2013)

With Eric Reed

- Soldier’s Hymn (Candid, 1990)
- From My Heart (Savant, 2002)

With Justin Robinson

- The Challenge (Arabesque, 1998)
- In the Spur of the Moment (WJ3, 2012)
- Alana’s Fantasy (Criss Cross Jazz, 2014) recorded November 4, 2013

With Jim Rotondi

- Introducing Jim Rotondi (Criss Cross Jazz, 1997)

With John Sneider

- Panorama (Double-Time, 2000)

With John Swana

- Tug of War (Criss Cross Jazz, 1999)

With Michal Urbaniak

- Ask Me Now (SteepleChase, 2000)

With Myron Walden

- Hypnosis (NYC Music, 1996)
- Like a Flower Seeking the Sun (NYC Music, 1999)
- Apex - Volume I (Demi Sound Records, 2000)
- Apex - Volume II (Demi Sound Records, 2000)

With David Weiss

- The Mirror (Fresh Sound New Talent, 2004)
- Endangered Species: The Music of Wayne Shorter (Motéma, 2013)

With Scott Wendholt

- The Scheme of Things (Criss Cross Jazz, 1993)

With Pete Yellin

- How Long Has This Been Going On? (Jazzed Media, 2008)
