= Season of Changes =

Studio album by Brian Blade
- Released: May 6, 2008
- Recorded: October 10–13, 2007
- Studios: The Clubhouse Studio, Rhinebeck, New York
- Genre: Jazz
- Length: 46:26
- Label: Verve
- Producers: Brian Blade, Jon Cowherd

Brian Blade chronology
Perceptual (2000)	Season of Changes (2008)	Mama Rosa (2009)

Professional ratings
Review scores
Source	Rating
All About Jazz	4.5/5 stars
Allmusic	5/5 stars
The Guardian	4/5 stars

Season of Changes is a studio album by Brian Blade & The Fellowship Band.

== Reception ==
Writing for All About Jazz, John Kelman said:

The twin-horn frontline of Myron Walden (alto saxophone, bass clarinet) and Melvin Butler (tenor saxophone), is another definitive. The two mesh so synchronously that together they create a denser, more singular sound when playing melody, but are equally capable and individual as improvisers of strength and subtlety...

As much as Blade's loosely expressive playing defines any project with which he's associated, it's the combination of transcendent but never invasive spirituality, the writing's blend of horns and guitar into a uniquely identifiable texture, and the group's ability to be at once melodically direct and improvisationally sophisticated, that creates that unmistakable sound instantly apparent on Season Of Changes.

== Track listing ==
All tracks composed by Brian Blade unless otherwise indicated.

1. "Rubylou's Lullaby" - 4:38
2. "Return of the Prodigal Son" (Jon Cowherd) - 8:54
3. "Stoner Hill" - 3:19
4. "Season of Changes" (Cowherd) - 12:00
5. "Most Precious One" - 2:50
6. "Most Precious One (Prodigy)" - 3:11
7. "Improvisation" (Cowherd, Myron Walden)
8. "Alpha and Omega" - 1:28
9. "Omni" - 6:10

== Personnel ==
- Brian Blade - drums
- Melvin Butler - tenor saxophone
- Myron Walden - alto saxophone, bass clarinet
- Jon Cowherd - piano, Moog synthesizer, organ
- Kurt Rosenwinkel - guitar
- Christopher Thomas - bass
