= Dreaming Wide Awake =

Studio album by Lizz Wright
- Released: June 14, 2005
- Recorded: October 27–November 01, 2004, December 05, 2004
- Studio: Allaire Studios, Shokan, New York, Sunset Sound Factory, Los Angeles, CA, Sear Sound, New York, NY
- Genre: Vocal jazz
- Length: 49:33
- Label: Verve
- Producer: Craig Street

Lizz Wright chronology
Salt (2003)	Dreaming Wide Awake (2005)	The Orchard (2008)

Professional ratings
Review scores
Source	Rating
All About Jazz	(not rated)
Allmusic	4/5 stars
Jazzitude	(not rated) link

Dreaming Wide Awake is the second album by singer and composer Lizz Wright, released in 2005 (see 2005 in music). It reached number one on the Billboard Top Contemporary Jazz chart. The song 'Hit the Ground' featured in an episode of House, season 3 episode 14 – "Insensitive".

== Track listing ==
1. "A Taste of Honey" (Ric Marlow, Bobby Scott) – 3:51
2. "Stop" (Joe Henry) – 3:32
3. "Hit the Ground" (Lizz Wright, Jesse Harris, Toshi Reagon) – 3:31
4. "When I Close My Eyes" (Marc Anthony Thompson, Dougie Bowne, Yuka Honda) – 3:16
5. "I'm Confessin'" (Doc Daugherty, Neiburg, Ellis Reynolds) – 2:58
6. "Old Man" (Neil Young) – 3:40
7. "Wake Up, Little Sparrow" (Ella Jenkins) – 3:00
8. "Chasing Strange" (Marc Anthony Thompson) – 3:48
9. "Get Together" (Chester Powers) – 4:42
10. "Trouble" (Lizz Wright, Carlos Henderson) – 5:12
11. "Dreaming Wide Awake" (Lizz Wright) – 3:44
12. "Without You" (Jesse Harris) – 4:05

Bonus track

13. "Narrow Daylight" (Diana Krall, Elvis Costello) – 4:04

== Personnel ==
- Lizz Wright – vocals
- Chris Bruce – guitar
- David Piltch – bass
- Earl Harvin – drums
- Glenn Patscha – keyboards, backing vocals

Additional musicians

- Bill Frisell – guitar (tracks 1, 9, 11)
- Greg Leisz – guitar (2, 6, 7, 12, 13)
- Patrick Warren – keyboards (4, 8, 11, 12)
- Jeff Haynes – percussion (1, 4, 9)
- Toshi Reagon - backing vocals (3, 9)
- Marc Anthony Thompson – harmonica, backing vocals (6)

Production

- Craig Street - producer
- Ron Goldstein and Joe Mc Ewen - executive producers
- S. Husky Höskulds – recording and mix engineer (at Allaire Studios, Shokan, NY, and Sunset Sound Factory, Los Angeles, for mix and additional recordings)
- Matthew Cullen - second engineer (at Allaire Studios)
- Jason Mott and Kevin Dean - second engineer (at Sunset Sound Factory)
- Danny Kopelson - recording engineer (track 1 and additional recordings at Sear Sound, NY)
- Steve Mazur - second engineer (1)
- Chris Allen - assistant engineer (1)
- Michael Musmanno - second engineer (additional recordings)
- Greg Calbi - mastering (at Sterling Sound, NY)
- Hollis King - art direction
- Rika Ishiki - design
- Bill Phelps - photography
