= Chiara Izzi =

Italian musician

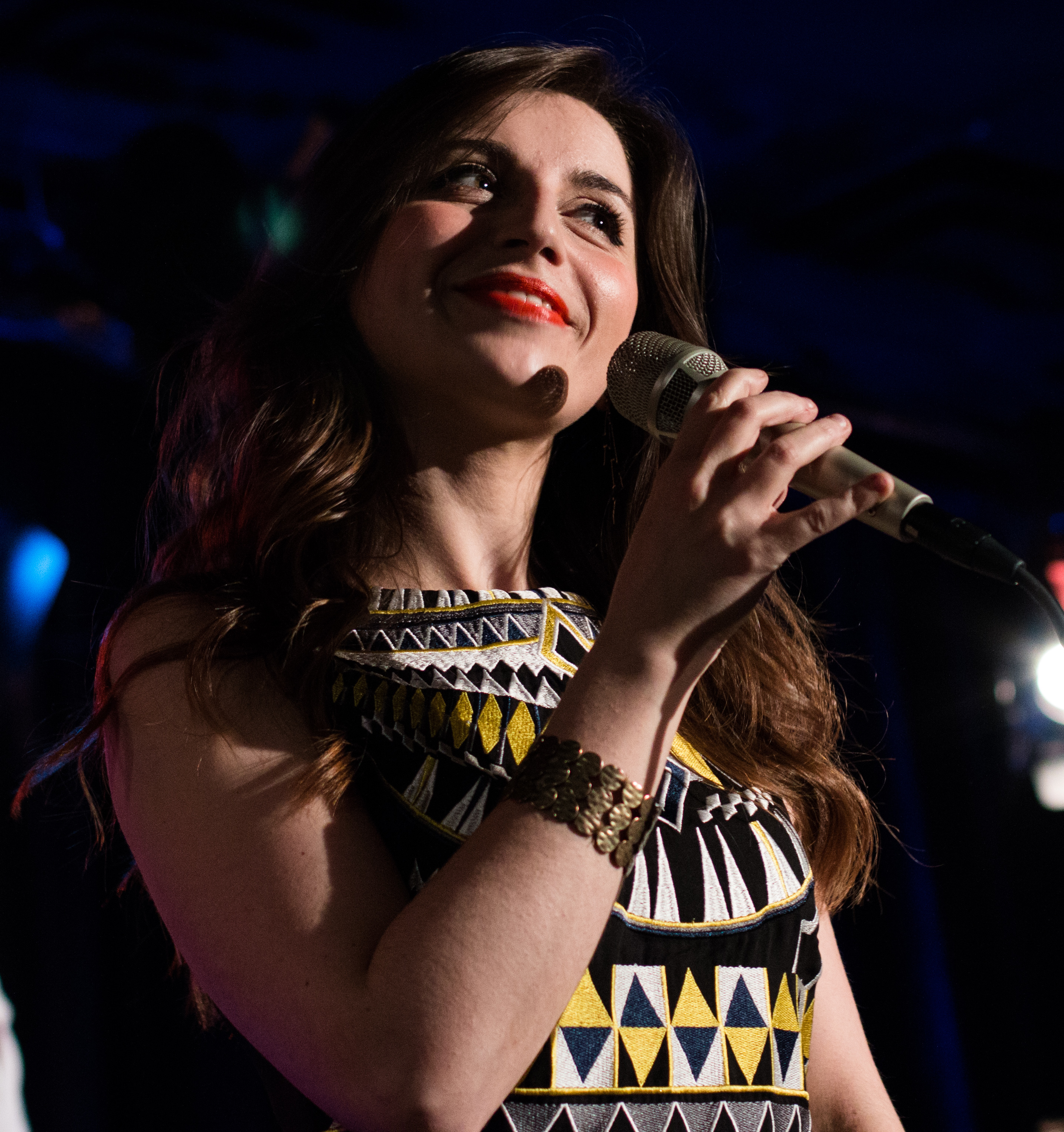
- Chiara Izzi at the Iridium (NYC)

Background information
- Born: May 22, 1985 (age 41); Campobasso, Italy
- Genres: Jazz, world, pop
- Occupations: Singer, composer
- Instruments: Vocals, piano
- Years active: 2004–present
- Labels: Dot Time, Jando Music, Via Veneto Jazz
- Website: www.chiaraizzi.com

Chiara Izzi (Italian: [ˈkjaːra ˈittsi]; born May 22, 1985) is an Italian jazz singer/composer and musician. She sings in Italian, English, Spanish and Portuguese. Winner of the Montreux Jazz Festival Voice Competition in 2011, her vocal style fuses jazz, pop, and Mediterranean sounds.

== Biography ==
Chiara Izzi, Italian singer, composer and pianist, was born May 22, 1985. She grew up in the city of Campobasso, in Molise, Italy, where she studied classical piano for almost a decade before switching her focus to jazz at age 17. She studied voice and piano at the Thelonious Monk School in her hometown, when she first heard Ella Fitzgerald, Anita O’Day, Frank Sinatra, and João Gilberto.

From 2004 she started working professionally in her hometown's jazz scene, where her first band, BlueTime Quintet, was formed. With that group she released her first collaborative album, Lite Blue, in 2008.

Shortly thereafter she won several awards in her native Italy, winning in the group category at Barga Jazz 2009 and taking first place at the Lucca Jazz Donna Contest and third place at the Chicco Bettinardi Contest in 2010.

Her international breakthrough came in 2011 when she won the Montreux Jazz Festival Voice Competition. Quincy Jones, president of the jury for that year's competition, awarded her the first prize and urged her to make a move to the United States, advice she would take a few years later.

In the meantime, she returned to the Montreux festival in 2012 to open for Paco de Lucía, and in 2013 released her debut album as a leader, Motifs, with the American label Dot Time Records.

In 2014 Izzi moved to New York City and began performing on the New York jazz scene at venues such as Iridium Jazz Club, Birdland Jazz Club, Smalls Jazz Club, Blue Note Jazz Club, The 55 Bar and Rockwood Music Hall, working with musicians such as Kevin Hays, Leon Parker, Ken Peplowski, Diego Figueiredo, Jeff Hamilton, Aaron Goldberg, Bruce Barth, Eliot Zigmund and Warren Wolf.

On March 11, 2019 she released the album Across The Sea on Jando Music in collaboration with Kevin Hays and featuring Rob Jost, Greg Joseph, Chris Potter, Nir Felder, Grégoire Maret, Omer Avital and Rógerio Boccato. Also in 2019 she performed at the festival "Unexpected Italy: a Celebration of Italian Culture" at the Kennedy Center.

In 2020 she won the Independent Music Awards honor in the Jazz with Vocals category for her recording of her composition "Circles of the Mind" with pianist Kevin Hays and featuring Nir Felder.

In 2022 she released the piano-and-voice album Live in Bremen on Dot Time Records with pianist Andrea Rea.

== Critical reception ==
Writing for the Folk & Acoustic Music Exchange, reviewer Mark S. Tucker said that Izzi's vocal style "slides between beatnik swinger, nightclub adept, and hip stage show chanteuse." Jazz Journal reviewer Wif Stenger wrote that "Izzi has a wonderful range of expression, singing assuredly in three languages, sometimes with a girlish tinge that echoes Emilíana Torrini or almost Blossom Dearie." All About Jazz reviewer Michael Bailey described Izzi as a "voice with a well-scrubbed sensual vitality that is fresh and crisp," and wrote that she is "a force of nature." Reviewer Travis Rogers called Izzi "A talent to be heard, admired and anticipated" and jazz journalist Dee Dee McNeil wrote that "Chiara Izzi has a voice full of innocence and passion that immediately garnered my consideration. [Across the Sea] adds world music to the mix and invites us to open our minds and hearts to how music crosses all boundaries and how it joins us, like love, across the continents and worldly divides."

== Discography ==
=== As leader ===
- Lite Blue with The BlueTime Quintet (2008)
- Alfonsina y el mar (2010)
- Motifs (Dot Time, 2013)
- Across the Sea (Jando Music/Via Veneto Jazz, 2019)
- Live in Bremen (Dot Time, 2022)

=== As guest ===
- Europa Jazz Project, Moreno Bussoletti (Rara, 2013)
- Come Closer, Diego Figueiredo (Stunt, 2019)
