= Diego Figueiredo =

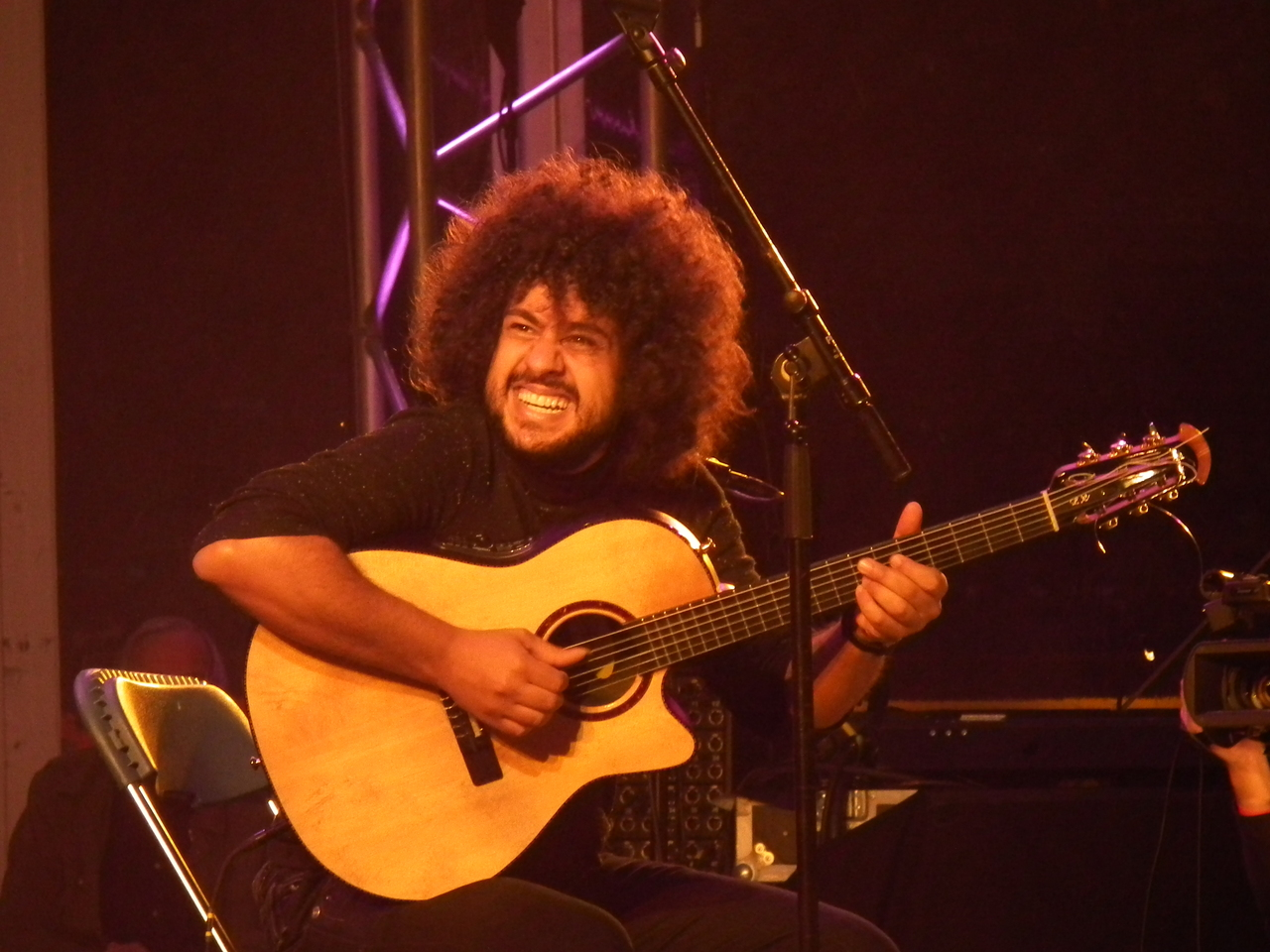
- Figueiredo in 2010

Background information
- Origin: Franca, Brazil
- Genre: Jazz
- Labels: Biscoito Fino, Stunt Records, Arbors Records, Venus Records
- Website: www.diegofigueiredo.com

Diego Figueiredo (born 23 July, 1980) is a Grammy-nominated Brazilian jazz guitarist.

== Biography ==
Figueiredo began playing music at a young age, going through a number of different instruments before finally choosing guitar at age 12. He was playing at pubs and nightclubs by 15, both with groups and as a solo musician. He released his first album at 17.

== Discography ==
- Diego Figueiredo Group (The Best of Brazilian Music Live) (1999)
- Segundas Intenções (Atração, 2004)
- El Colibri (DF Records, 2005)
- Autêntico (DF Records, 2006)
- Solo (Discolandia, 2007) DVD
- Hojas Secas with Mimi Arakaki, Alexandre Piu (Discolandia, 2007)
- Ao Vivo (DF Records, 2007)
- Standards (DF Records, 2007)
- Dadaiô (Stunt, 2008)
- Smile with Cyrille Aimée (DF Records, 2009)
- Brazilian Accent with Moisés Alves (DF Records, 2009)
- Vivência (Biscoito Fino, 2009)
- Vale de Lobos (DF Records, 2010)
- Just the Two of Us with Cyrille Aimée (Venus, 2010)
- Zibididi with Gabriel Grossi (DF Records, 2011)
- Tempos Bons (Stunt, 2012)
- Chorinho (DF Records, 2014)
- The Best of Diego Figueiredo I (DF Records, 2014)
- Duô with Chico Oliveira (DF Records, 2015)
- The Best of Diego Figueiredo II (DF Records, 2015)
- Broken Bossa (Stunt, 2015)
- Violões Contemporâneos with Luis Caldas (DF Records, 2017)
- Organic with Derico (Atração, 2018)
- Come Closer with Cyrille Aimée, Janis Siegel, Chiara Izzi (Stunt, 2019)
- Amizade with Ken Peplowski (Arbors, 2019)
- Compilation (Arbors, 2020)
- Antarctica (Arbors, 2021)
- Follow the Signs (Arbors, 2022)
- My World (Arbors, 2023)
- I Love Samba (Arbors, 2024)
- Violão Caipira (Arbors, 2025)
- Horse Blues (Arbors, 2026)
