= Perceptual (album) =

Studio album by Brian Blade
- Released: April 11, 2000
- Recorded: September 1999
- Length: 53:51
- Label: Blue Note
- Producers: Brian Blade; Jon Cowherd

Brian Blade chronology
Brian Blade Fellowship (1998)	Perceptual (2000)	Season of Changes (2008)

Professional ratings
Review scores
Source	Rating
AllMusic	4/5 stars

Perceptual is the second studio album by Brian Blade Fellowship, released in 2000, on the Blue Note label.

== Track listing ==
All tracks composed by Brian Blade; except where indicated

1. "Perceptual" (Jon Cowherd) – 6:28
2. "Evinrude-Fifty (Trembling)" – 7:56
3. "Reconciliation" (Cowherd) – 6:44
4. "Crooked Creek" (Cowherd) – 9:10
5. "Patron Saint of Girls" – 2:40
6. "The Sunday Boys (Improvisation)" (Cowherd, Myron Walden) – 1:06
7. "Variations of A Bloodline" – 9:09
8. "Steadfast" – 8:21
9. "Trembling" – 2:17

== Personnel ==
=== Brian Blade Fellowship ===
- Brian Blade – acoustic guitar, drums, vocals, liner notes, art director
- Melvin Butler – tenor and soprano saxophone
- Jon Cowherd – piano, pump organ, Fender Rhodes
- Dave Easley – pedal steel guitar
- Daniel Lanois – acoustic guitar, guitar, pedal steel guitar
- Kurt Rosenwinkel – acoustic guitar and electric guitar
- Christopher Thomas – bass, backing vocal
- Myron Walden – bass clarinet, alto saxophone
- Joni Mitchell – vocals (track 8)

=== Production ===
- Brian Blade – producer
- Jon Cowherd – producer
- Gordon Jee – Director
- Greg Calbi – Mastering Advisor
- Mantis Evar – Product Manager
- Joe Ferla – Engineer, Mixing
- Mark Howard – Engineer
- Anthony Gorman – Assistant Engineer
- Andrea Yankovsky – Assistant Engineer
- Edward Curtis – Photography
- Deborah Feingold – Photography
