= The Orchard (Lizz Wright album) =

Studio album by Lizz Wright
- Released: 2008
- Genre: Jazz, soul
- Length: 52:59
- Label: Verve Forecast

Lizz Wright chronology
Dreaming Wide Awake (2005)	The Orchard (2008)	Fellowship (2010)

The Orchard is an album by singer Lizz Wright that was released in 2008.

== Track listing ==
1. "Coming Home"
2. "My Heart"
3. "I Idolize You" (Ike Turner)
4. "Hey Mann"
5. "Another Angel"
6. "When I Fall"
7. "Leave Me Standing Alone"
8. "Speak Your Heart"
9. "This Is"
10. "Song for Mia"
11. "Thank You" (Jimmy Page, Robert Plant)
12. "Strange" ([Mel Tillis], [Fred Burch])

== Personnel ==
- Lizz Wright – vocals
- Glenn Patscha – keyboards, background vocals
- Patrick Warren – keyboards
- Kenny Banks – piano
- Larry Campbell – pedal steel guitar, mandolin
- Oren Bloedow – acoustic guitar, electric guitar, bass
- Chris Bruce – acoustic guitar, electric guitar, bass
- Joey Burns – acoustic guitar, cello, bass, quarto, baritone guitar
- Toshi Reagon – acoustic guitar, background vocals
- John Convertino – drums, percussion, vibraphone
- Larry Eagle – drums, percussion
- Ben Perowsky – drums
- Josette Newsam – background vocals
- Catherine Russell – background vocals
- Marc Anthony Thompson – background vocals
- The Southside Horns (Jacob Valenzuela & Martin Wenk) – trumpets
