= Misty (Harold Mabern album) =

Studio album by Harold Mabern
- Released: August 22, 2007
- Recorded: December 20, 2006
- Studio: The Studio, NYC
- Genre: Jazz
- Length: 51:43
- Label: Venus; VHCD-78015
- Producer: Tetsuo Hara, Todd Barkan

Harold Mabern chronology
Somewhere Over the Rainbow (2006)	Misty (2007)	Mr. Lucky (2012)

Misty is a solo album by pianist Harold Mabern which was originally released on the Venus label in Japan in 2007.

== Reception ==
Professional ratings
Review scores
Source	Rating
Allmusic	4.5/5 stars

The Allmusic review by Ken Dryden stated that "This solo piano date is one of his very best efforts".

== Track listing ==
All compositions by Harold Mabern except where noted

1. "Dat Dere" (Bobby Timmons) – 4:52
2. "She" (George Shearing) – 4:31
3. "Smoke Gets in Your Eyes" (Jerome Kern, Otto Harbach) – 4:14
4. "Mabern's Boogie" – 2:32
5. "The Way We Were" (Marvin Hamlisch, Alan Bergman, Marilyn Bergman) – 5:10
6. "Unforgettable" (Irving Gordon) – 4:19
7. "You Don't Know What Love Is" (Gene de Paul, Don Raye) – 3:51
8. "A Child Is Born" (Thad Jones) – 5:18
9. "Wail Bait" (Quincy Jones) – 3:45
10. "Stolen Moments" (Oliver Nelson) – 4:18
11. "Wayne's Blues" – 3:59
12. "Misty" (Erroll Garner) – 4:54

== Personnel ==
- Harold Mabern – piano
