= Blues for Pat: Live in San Francisco =

Blues For Pat: Live in San Francisco

Live album by Joshua Redman
- Released: 1995
- Recorded: Live in San Francisco 1994
- Genre: Jazz
- Length: 1:36:44
- Label: Jazz Door; JD 1282

Joshua Redman chronology
Spirit of the Moment – Live at the Village Vanguard (1995)	Blues For Pat: Live in San Francisco (1995)	Freedom in the Groove (1996)

Blues For Pat: Live in San Francisco, is a live album by The Joshua Redman Quartet featuring Pat Metheny, Christian McBride and Billy Higgins, released in 1995 (JD 1282).

Professional ratings
Review scores
Source	Rating
Allmusic	4.5/5 stars

== Background ==
The music is composed by different composers mostly Redman, integrating elements of contemporary jazz.

== Reception ==
The AllMusic reviewer Scott Yanow awarded the album 4.5 stars, stating "After recording Wish for Warner Bros. in a quartet with guitarist Pat Metheny, bassist Charlie Haden and drummer Billy Higgins, young tenorman Joshua Redman hit the road with the same group (except with Christian McBride in Haden's place). This European CD, probably a bootleg, shows just how exciting the band was live. On 70 minutes of music recorded in a San Francisco club, Redman often indulges in close interplay and exciting tradeoffs with Metheny; the two clearly inspired each other. The recording quality is decent, and the performances overall actually exceed Wish in passion and creativity. Highlights include "Blues for Pat," an 18½-minute version of "St. Thomas" and "Carla's Groove." All Joshua Redman and Pat Metheny fans will want this one."

== Track listing ==
No.	Title	Writer(s)	Length
1.	"Blues For Pat"	Charlie Haden	14:25
2.	"Sketches"		14:15
3.	"Wish"		10:45
4.	"St. Thomas"	Sonny Rollins	18:26
5.	"We Had a Sister"	Pat Metheny	7:07
6.	"Carla's Groove"		5:13
Total length:			01:36:44

== Personnel ==
- Joshua Redman – tenor saxophone
- Pat Metheny – guitars
- Christian McBride – upright bass
- Billy Higgins – drums

== Notes ==
- Photography by Manfred Rinderspacher
- Recorded live in San Francisco 1994
