= A Cloud of Red Dust =

Studio album debut by Stefon Harris

Studio album debut by Stefon Harris
- Released: 1998
- Recorded: October 6–7, 1997
- Studio: Avatar (New York, New York)
- Genre: Post-bop; Hard bop
- Length: 48:37
- Label: Blue Note
- Producer: Billy Banks, Stefon Harris

Stefon Harris chronology
A Cloud of Red Dust (1997)	Black Action Figure (1999)

Professional ratings
Review scores
Source	Rating
AllMusic	4/5 stars
The Penguin Guide to Jazz	3.5/4 stars

A Cloud of Red Dust is the debut album by jazz vibraphonist Stefon Harris. It was recorded in 1997 and released by Blue Note Records.

== Recording and music ==
The album was recorded in October 1997. Most of the material was composed by Harris. For the album release, the tracks were connected with "short interludes to create an almost continuous suite".

== Release and reception ==
A Cloud of Red Dust was released by Blue Note Records. The Penguin Guide to Jazz commented on Harris's "flowing lyricism, grafted onto a swinging shuffle beat, a combination of metres that is always threatening to fall apart but never quite does". The AllMusic reviewer concluded: "As a whole, A Cloud of Red Dust offers a fine baseline from which to track Stefon Harris' development as perhaps the next great vibraphone stylist."

== Track listing ==
All tracks composed by Stefon Harris; except where noted.

No.	Title	Writer(s)	Length
1.	"Sophistry Harris"		5:06
2.	"And This Too Shall Pass"		8:31
3.	"Nature Music"		0:57
4.	"In the Garden of Thought"		6:01
5.	"Drum Storm"		0:54
6.	"The Prophet"		7:07
7.	"Sacred Forest"		1:28
8.	"A Cloud of Red Dust"		5:51
9.	"One String Blues"	Stefon Harris, Kimati Dinizulu	1:36
10.	"Jamo"		4:52
11.	"For You Mom & Dad"	Bobby Hutcherson	6:14

== Personnel ==
- Stefon Harris – vibraphone, balafon, orchestra bells
- Dwayne Burno – double bass
- Kamati Dinizulu – harp, percussions
- June Gardner – vocals
- Alvester Garnett – drums
- Mulgrew Miller, Jason Moran – piano
- Greg Osby – alto saxophone
- Steve Turre – trombone, shells
- Kaoru Watanabe – flute
- Steve Wilson – alto saxophone, soprano saxophone

Technical

- Jim Anderson - recording, mixing
- Deborah Feingold - photography
