= Freedom in the Groove =

Studio album by Joshua Redman
- Released: September 20, 1996
- Recorded: April 10–13, 1996
- Studio: Power Station, New York City
- Genre: Jazz
- Length: 1:09:07
- Label: Warner Bros.
- Producer: Matt Pierson

Joshua Redman chronology
Blues for Pat: Live in San Francisco (1995)	Freedom in the Groove (1996)	Timeless Tales for Changing Times (1998)

Professional ratings
Review scores
Source	Rating
AllMusic	4/5 stars
The Encyclopedia of Popular Music	3/5 stars
Tom Hull	B+
The Penguin Guide to Jazz Recordings	3.5/4 stars
The Rolling Stone Jazz & Blues Album Guide	4/5 stars

Freedom in the Groove is a 1996 studio album by American jazz saxophonist Joshua Redman.

== Reception ==
Leo Stanley of AllMusic stated: "Abandoning the traditional hard bop that has dominated his past recordings, Redman attempts to work himself into hip-hop and urban dance rhythms, which results in an occasionally intriguing but often frustrating album. Occasionally, the fusions work, with Redman contributing sympathetic, graceful licks to the gently insistent rhythms. Too often, the record sounds forced and stilted, which is unfortunate, since jazz/hip-hop fusion need a musician of Redman's caliber to make it credible in the jazz world."

== Track listing ==
All songs were written and arranged by Joshua Redman.

1. "Hide and Seek"
2. "One Shining Soul"
3. "Streams of Consciousness"
4. "When the Sun Comes Down"
5. "Home Fries"
6. "Invocation"
7. "Dare I Ask?"
8. "Cat Battles"
9. "Pantomime"
10. "Can't Dance"

== Personnel ==
- Joshua Redman – tenor (1, 3–5, 7, 8), soprano (2, 9) & alto (6, 10) saxophone
- Peter Bernstein – electric guitar
- Peter Martin – piano
- Chris Thomas – acoustic bass
- Brian Blade – drums
