= Vertigo (Chris Potter album) =

Studio album by the Chris Potter Quartet
- Released: August 4, 1998
- Recorded: April 9–10, 1998
- Venue: Sony Studios, NYC
- Genre: Jazz
- Length: 63:09
- Label: Concord; CCD-4843-2
- Producer: Allen Farnham

Chris Potter chronology
Unspoken (1997)	Vertigo (1998)	This Will Be (2001)

Vertigo is the seventh studio album by jazz saxophonist Chris Potter, released on the Concord label in 1998. It features Potter with guitarist Kurt Rosenwinkel, bassist Scott Colley and drummer Billy Drummond. Tenor saxophonist Joe Lovano appears on three tracks.

== Reception ==
Professional ratings
Review scores
Source	Rating
AllMusic	4/5 stars
The Penguin Guide to Jazz Recordings	3.5/4 stars

The AllMusic review by David R. Adler stated: "Vertigo is Potter's most mature and expressive work to date. ... Vertigo reveals Potter as a player and composer with an uncommonly personal vision".

All About Jazz correspondent Jack Bowers observed that "all of the songs on Vertigo, Potter's fifth date under his own name for Concord Jazz, were composed by the 27-year-old South Carolinian, and none of them, to these ears, serves as more than a convenient springboard for improvisation ... if I were more enamored of Potter's still-developing prowess as a composer, the session would receive more than a lukewarm endorsement".

== Track listing ==
All compositions by Chris Potter

1. "Shiva" − 8:05
2. "Vertigo" − 8:27
3. "Long Walk, Short Pier" − 8:07
4. "Act III, Scene I" − 3:38
5. "Fishy" − 6:31
6. "This Will Be" − 7:01
7. "Almost Home" − 5:49
8. "Modeen's Mood" − 9:32
9. "Wake Up" − 5:59

== Personnel ==
- Chris Potter - tenor saxophone, soprano saxophone, bass clarinet, piano
- Kurt Rosenwinkel − guitar
- Scott Colley − bass
- Billy Drummond - drums
- Joe Lovano − tenor saxophone (tracks 3, 6 & 8)
