= Traveling Mercies =

Studio album by Chris Potter
- Released: September 17, 2002
- Recorded: January 27–29, 2002
- Studio: Avatar, New York City
- Genre: Jazz
- Length: 64:02
- Label: Verve; SCC 3034
- Producer: Jason Olaine, Chris Potter

Chris Potter chronology
Gratitude (2001)	Traveling Mercies (2002)	Lift: Live at the Village Vanguard (2004)

Traveling Mercies is the ninth studio album by jazz saxophonist Chris Potter released on the Verve label in 2002. It features keyboardist Kevin Hays, bassist Scott Colley and drummer Bill Stewart, along with guitarists John Scofield and Adam Rogers guesting separately on seven of the ten tracks.

== Reception ==
Professional ratings
Review scores
Source	Rating
Allmusic	4/5 stars
All About Jazz	4/5 stars
The Guardian	3/5 stars
The Penguin Guide to Jazz Recordings	2.5/4 stars

The Allmusic review by David R. Adler awarded the album 4 stars stating "Chris Potter gets more and more adventurous. On this follow-up to the strong Gratitude, the tenor and soprano saxophonist beefs up strong writing and heady group interplay with occasional sampled sounds and miscellaneous textures like clavinet and reed organ ... As a jazz record, Traveling Mercies is very much a product of its post-millennial times, but it still comes across as highly individual. Its value will be lasting".

All About Jazz correspondent Mark F. Turner observed "Potter possesses a strong tenor sound, which is throaty and deep with meaning, but it's a real treat to hear him on bass clarinet, flute, and odd instrumentation such as the reed organ. Combine this with exceptional compositional skills, and choice musicians; Traveling Mercies is a cut above the rest".

Not all reviews were as enthusiastic. In The Guardian, John Fordham wrote "Plenty of virtuosity, but it doesn't really do Chris Potter's obvious musicality justice". JazzTimes' writer Aaron Steinberg said "despite some fine playing by Potter, Traveling Mercies’ attempts to sound eclectic and vibrant end up sounding calculated and cautious. At this point, Potter fronting a band with quick reflexes on daring material, minus concept and gimmicks, would be more than welcome"

== Track listing ==
All compositions by Chris Potter except where indicated

1. "Megalopolis" – 7:00
2. "Snake Oil" – 6:04
3. "Invisible Man" – 5:08
4. "Washed Ashore" – 7:07
5. "Children Go" (Traditional) – 5:37
6. "Any Moment Now" – 5:21
7. "Migrations" – 8:06
8. "Azalea" – 5:50
9. "Highway One" – 10:12
10. "Just as I Am" (Charlotte Elliott) – 3:37

== Personnel ==
- Chris Potter – tenor saxophone, soprano saxophone, alto flute, bass clarinet, reed organ, clavinet, sampler, percussion, voice
- John Scofield − guitar (tracks 1, 4 & 7)
- Adam Rogers (tracks 6 & 9) − acoustic guitar, slide guitar (tracks 3 & 8)
- Kevin Hays – piano, Fender Rhodes, clavinet
- Scott Colley − bass
- Bill Stewart – drums
