= Rainbow Sign =

Studio album by Ron Miles
- Released: October 9, 2020
- Recorded: 2019
- Studios: Mighty Fine, Denver, Colorado, US; Sear Sound, New York City, New York, US
- Genres: Modal jazz; pop jazz
- Length: 69:50
- Language: Instrumental
- Label: Blue Note
- Producers: Colin Bricker; Ron Miles

Ron Miles chronology
I Am a Man (2017)	Rainbow Sign (2020)

Rainbow Sign (2020) is the twelfth studio album by American jazz musician Ron Miles. It was released by Blue Note Records to positive critical reviews, and was Miles' final studio album, coming two years prior to his death in March 2022.

== Recording ==
The album was recorded in mid-2018 during a period when Miles was caring for his dying father. The sessions reunited him with the musicians who played on his previous album I Am a Man, including longtime collaborator Bill Frisell on guitar and drummer Brian Blade.

== Critical reception ==
Professional ratings
Review scores
Source	Rating
All About Jazz	4.5/5 stars
AllMusic	4/5 stars
DownBeat	4.5/5 stars
Financial Times	4/5 stars
Jazz Journal	4/5 stars
Jazzwise	3/5 stars
PopMatters	8/10
The Times	4/5 stars

The editorial staff of AllMusic Guide gave the album four out of five stars, with reviewer Thom Jurek noting how Miles blends "polytonal modal music, blues, gospel, post-bop, and pop". The site also included it in the best jazz albums of 2020. Kevin Whitehead of Fresh Air praises the dream-like quality of the musicians and their ability to work together to realize Miles' music and he notes the influence of pop music. In The Times, Chris Pearson gave the album four out of five stars, also pointing out the interplay of the musicians. Writing in Financial Times, Mike Hobart also scored Rainbow Sign four out of five stars for the "clean lines, close-knit interplay and an understated pulse" on the album.

== Track listing ==
All songs written by Ron Miles

1. "Like Those Who Dream" – 15:56
2. "Queen of the South" – 4:20
3. "Average" – 11:12
4. "Rainbow Sign" – 7:08
5. "The Rumor" – 4:30
6. "Custodian of the New" – 7:49
7. "This Old Man" – 6:57
8. "Binder" – 6:01
9. "A Kind Word" – 5:57

== Personnel ==
- Ron Miles – cornet, band leader, production
- Brian Blade – drums
- Bill Frisell – guitar
- Jason Moran – piano, photography
- Thomas Morgan – double bass

Technical personnel

- Lurah Blade – photography
- Colin Bricker – engineering, mixing, production
- Greg Calbi – mastering
- Monica Frisell – photography
- Todd Gallopo – art direction, design
- Thomas Krebs – photography
- Kevin Lee – assistance
- Owen Mulholland – assistance
- Hans Wendl – project management

== See also ==
- 2020 in American music
- 2020 in jazz
- List of 2020 albums
