= Gratitude (Chris Potter album) =

Studio album by Chris Potter
- Released: April 3, 2001
- Recorded: September 27–28, 2000
- Venue: Avatar (New York, New York)
- Genre: Jazz
- Length: 71:21
- Label: Verve; 314 549 433-2
- Producer: Jason Olaine, Chris Potter

Chris Potter chronology
This Will Be (2001)	Gratitude (2001)	Traveling Mercies (2002)

Gratitude is the eighth studio album by jazz saxophonist Chris Potter, the first to be released on the Verve label, on April 3, 2001. It features Potter's quartet of pianist Kevin Hays, bassist Scott Colley and drummer Brian Blade.

== Reception ==
Professional ratings
Review scores
Source	Rating
All About Jazz	4/5 stars
AllMusic	4.5/5 stars
The Penguin Guide to Jazz Recordings	3.5/4 stars

The AllMusic review by Paula Edelstein stated: "Saxophonist Chris Potter honors the legacy of some of jazz's greats on Gratitude, his debut for Verve. The award-winning virtuoso and composer is compelling on his tributes to John Coltrane, Eddie Harris, Wayne Shorter, Charlie Parker, and several other legendary saxophonists. ... Potter, leading his great quartet of contemporaries makes a significant contribution to jazz history with this project and offers musical statements and voices that are truly varied in scope and deep in their essence".

All About Jazz correspondent David Adler observed: "Jazz is a lethargic sales category, so major labels often like jazz artists to do concept albums — usually tributes to legends both living and dead — to attract the attention of otherwise indifferent consumers. But tributes often seem self-conscious and forced, stultifying the artist’s individual voice by imposing an artificial agenda upon it. Happily, Gratitude escapes this fate. It’s a generalized tribute, an acknowledgement of saxophone greats (eleven of them, to be exact) who have influenced Potter and continue to do so. (McCoy Tyner made a similar gesture with Jazz Roots) The idea seems to flow naturally from Potter’s artistic self-image, and so it serves him well".

== Track listing ==
All compositions by Chris Potter except where indicated

1. "The Source - For John Coltrane" − 6:39
2. "Shadow - For Joe Henderson" − 5:50
3. "Sun King - For Sonny Rollins" − 7:01
4. "High Noon - For Eddie Harris" − 8:21
5. "Eurydice - For Wayne Shorter" − 6:02
6. "The Mind's Eye Intro" − 0:44
7. "The Mind's Eye − For Michael Brecker and Joe Lovano" − 7:14
8. "Gratitude - For All the Past Masters" − 3:07
9. "The Visitor − For Lester Young − 7:40
10. "Body and Soul - For Coleman Hawkins" (Johnny Green, Frank Eyton, Edward Heyman, Robert Sour) − 5:30
11. "Star Eyes - For Charlie Parker" (Gene de Paul, Don Raye) − 5:23
12. "Vox Humana − For Ornette Coleman" − 5:26
13. "What's New - For the Current Generation" (Bob Haggart, Johnny Burke) − 2:24

== Personnel ==
- Chris Potter - tenor saxophone, alto saxophone, soprano saxophone, alto flute, bass clarinet, Chinese wood flute
- Kevin Hays - piano, Fender Rhodes electric piano
- Scott Colley − bass
- Brian Blade - drums
