= Fellowship (album) =

Studio album by Lizz Wright
- Released: September 28, 2010
- Recorded: n.d.
- Studio: Sear Sound and Stratosphere Sound, New York, NY
- Genre: Jazz, gospel
- Label: Verve Forecast
- Producer: Brian Bacchus (and Toshi Reagon)

Lizz Wright chronology
The Orchard (2008)	Fellowship (2010)	Freedom & Surrender (2015)

Fellowship is the fourth studio album by an American singer Lizz Wright, which was released on 28 September 2010 on Verve Forecast. Guest performances on the album include Meshell Ndegeocello, Bernice Johnson Reagon, Joan as Policewoman and Angélique Kidjo. The album debuted at No. 2 on the Billboard Jazz Album chart, and has sold 17,000 copies in the United States as of August 2015.

== Track listing ==
1. "Fellowship" (Meshell Ndegeocello, arranged by Toshi Reagon) – 3:32
2. "(I've Got to Use My) Imagination" (Barry Goldberg, Gerry Goffin) – 4:37
3. "I Remember, I Believe" (Bernice Johnson Reagon) – 5:30
4. "God Specializes" (Gloria Griffin, arr. by Toshi Reagon and Kenny Banks) – 4:29
5. Gospel Medley (Traditional, arr. by Kenny Banks, Johnson Reagon, Wright) – 8:30
  1. "I've Got a Feeling"
  2. "Power Lord"
  3. "Glory, Glory"
  4. "Up Above My Head"
  5. "Hold On Just a Little While Longer"
6. "Sweeping Through the City" (Wright, based on Matthew 5 1–12) – 1:56
7. "All the Seeds" (Wright, Angélique Kidjo) – 1:18
8. "Presence of the Lord" (Eric Clapton) – 4:51
9. "In from the Storm" (Jimi Hendrix) – 3:06
10. "Feed the Light" (Joan Wasser) – 2:58
11. "Oya" (Oya Kupola, Kidjo) – 1:31
12. "Amazing Grace" (John Newton) – 5:04
- Recorded at Sear Sound and Stratosphere Sound, New York, NY
- Mixed at Estudi O'Rand and Downtown Music Studios, New York, NY

== Personnel ==
- Lizz Wright - vocals
- Glen Patscha - keyboards, Fender Rhodes (tracks 1, 3, 4, 10), Hammond B3 (2–4), Wurlitzer electric piano (2, 8), piano (3), pump organ (8)
- Kenny Banks - piano (4, 5), backing vocals (6)
- David Cook - piano (8)
- Joan Wasser - violin and backing vocals (1, 3)
- Oren Bloedow - guitar (1, 3, 10)
- Marvin Sewell - guitar (2, 8, 9, 12), slide guitar (7, 9), e-bow (7)
- Robin Macatangay - guitar (2)
- Meshell Ndegeocello (as Me'Shell N'Degeocello) - bass (1, 10), vocals (1)
- Nicholas D'Amato - bass (2, 8)
- Todd Sickafoose - acoustic bass (3)
- Mimi Jones - acoustic bass (4)
- Rocky Bryant - drums (1, 3, 4, 10)
- Alfredo 'Catfish' Alias - drums (2)
- Jano Rix - drums (8)
- Fred Walcott - percussion (2), shaker (8)
- Nacho Arimany - cajón and tambourine (9)
- Angélique Kidjo - vocals (7, 11)
- Toshi Reagon - backing vocals (1, 3, 6)
- Nacho Newsam-Marchak - backing vocals (1, 4, 6)
- Bernice Johnson Reagon - backing vocals (3, 5)

Production

- Kevin Killen - Recording and mix
- Brian Bacchus - Production (2, 4–9, 11, 12)
- Toshi Reagon - Production (1, 3–5, 10)

== Charts ==
Chart (2010)	Peak position
US Top Gospel Albums (Billboard)	9
US Top Jazz Albums (Billboard)	2
