= Lift: Live at the Village Vanguard =

Live album by Chris Potter Quartet
- Released: May 25, 2004
- Recorded: December 13–14, 2002
- Venue: Village Vanguard, NYC
- Genre: Jazz
- Length: 76:39
- Label: Sunnyside; SCC 3022
- Producer: Chris Potter, Louise Holland

Chris Potter chronology
Traveling Mercies (2002)	Lift: Live at the Village Vanguard (2004)	Underground (2006)

Lift: Live at the Village Vanguard is the second live album by jazz saxophonist Chris Potter, recorded December 13 & 14, 2002 and released on the Sunnyside label in 2004. It features keyboardist Kevin Hays, bassist Scott Colley and drummer Bill Stewart.

== Reception ==
Professional ratings
Review scores
Source	Rating
Allmusic	4/5 stars
The Guardian	3/5 stars
All About Jazz	4/5 stars

The Allmusic review by Thom Jurek awarded the album 4 stars stating "Potter and his quartet are taking the gift of post-bop jazz and moving into new territories tonally, harmonically, and yes, thankfully, lyrically. This is forward-thinking music that is full of emotion, swing, and sophistication. It is readily accessible for anyone willing to encounter it either historically or on its own terms. Lift is a sharp, tough, and streetwise record of a fine gig played in a jazz temple with aplomb and sass. It points in new directions and offers a solid portrait of the artist as not only a strident voice, but as a visionary as well".

The Guardian 's John Fordham noted "Potter himself is often dazzling - particularly on two unaccompanied tenor sax overtures - though his muscular long lines and whirling ascents and descents occasionally substitute sound and fury for shape and contrast".

All About Jazz correspondent John Kelman observed "While Potter's sheer technical prowess sometimes threatens to overpower his innate musicality, for the most part he makes statements that are well-conceived, developed and executed. Eschewing the more concept-laden work of his past couple of albums, Lift is a celebration of playing at its most pure".

In JazzTimes Chris Kelsey wrote "tenor saxophonist Chris Potter’s Live at the Village Vanguard (Sunnyside) is, by any and all contemporary standards, a superb live album, thanks to some unruly ensemble work".

== Track listing ==
All compositions by Chris Potter except where indicated

1. "7.5" (Bill Stewart) − 14:57
2. "What You Wish" − 13:51
3. "Stella by Starlight" (Victor Young, Ned Washington) − 7:16
4. "Lift" − 11:58
5. "Okinawa" − 9:15
6. "Boogie Stop Shuffle Sax Intro" − 4:13
7. "Boogie Stop Shuffle" (Charles Mingus) − 15:09

== Personnel ==
- Chris Potter - tenor saxophone
- Kevin Hays - piano, Fender Rhodes
- Scott Colley − bass
- Bill Stewart - drums
