= David Weiss (musician) =

American jazz trumpeter (born 1964)

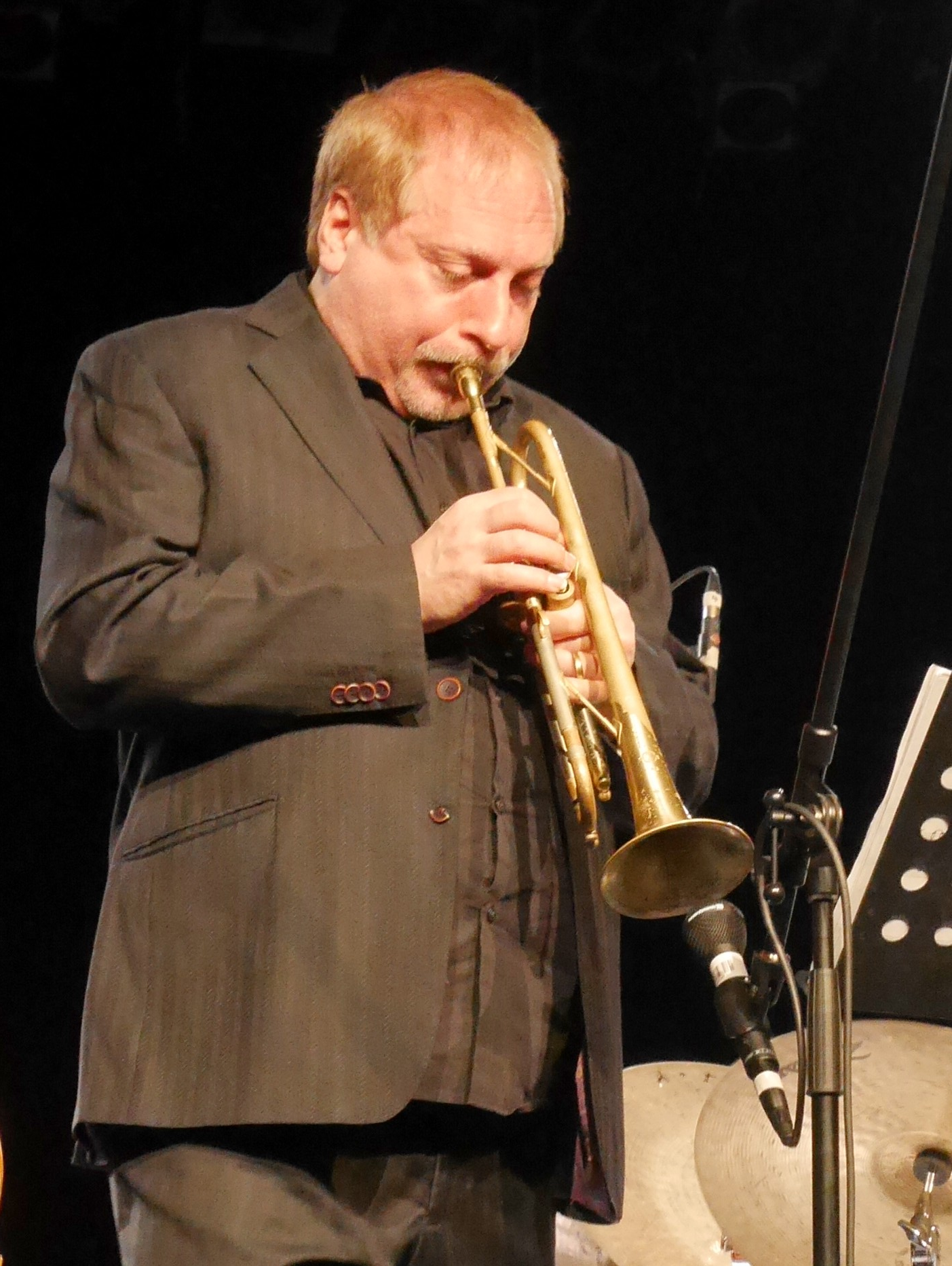
- David Weiss with The Cookers in Nice, France, 2016

Background information
- Born: October 21, 1964 (age 61); New York City
- Genres: Jazz
- Occupation: Musician
- Instrument: Trumpet
- Years active: 1986–present
- Labels: Motéma, Sunnyside, Fresh Sound
- Formerly of: The New Jazz Composers Octet, The Cookers
- Website: www.davidweissmusic.com

David Weiss (born October 21, 1964) is a jazz trumpeter and the founder of The New Jazz Composers Octet.

== Career ==
He studied music at North Texas State University, graduating in 1986. Returning to New York, he performed with Jaki Byard, Frank Foster, and Jimmy Heath. He continued his studies with trumpeters Tommy Turrentine and Bill Hardman, as well as attending Barry Harris's jazz classes. Eventually leading an "after hours" session for Harris, he performed with such musicians as Stephen Scott, Winard Harper, Leon Parker, Sam Newsome, Justin Robinson, Rodney Kendrick, Roy Hargrove, Clifford Jordan, Mulgrew Miller, Jeff Watts, Terence Blanchard, Benny Green, and Billy Hart.

In 1990, Weiss started a band with tenor saxophonist Craig Handy. The rest of the band rotated: Benny Green, Stephen Scott, or Dave Kikoski on piano, Christian McBride on bass, and Billy Hart or Jeff Watts on drums. Weiss assisted Handy with the music of The Cosby Mysteries, including arranging the title theme. From there, he began arranging for such artists as Abbey Lincoln, Freddie Hubbard, and Rodney Kendrick, Alto Legacy with Phil Woods, Vincent Herring, and Antonio Hart. He arranged an album called Haunted Melodies in tribute to Rahsaan Roland Kirk, as well as tribute concerts at Birdland for Freddie Hubbard, Booker Little, and Lee Morgan.

Recognizing a dearth of new jazz composition, Weiss founded The New Jazz Composers Octet, which Ben Ratliff of The New York Times immediately hailed as "the sound of the new jazz mainstream." Weiss's compositions on the Octet's second album won him grants from Chamber Music America and Doris Duke Jazz Ensembles Project: New Works Creation and Presentation.

Weiss released his first album as leader, Breathing Room, in 2002, featuring Craig Handy, Xavier Davis, Dwayne Burno, Marcus Strickland, and E. J. Strickland, some of whom are involved with the Octet. It received four star ratings from DownBeat magazine, Jazzwise, and 52nd Street.

== Discography ==
=== As leader ===
- Breathing Room (Fresh Sound, 2001)
- The Mirror (Fresh Sound, 2004)
- Snuck In (Sunnyside, 2008)
- Snuck Out (Sunnyside, 2008)
- Venture Inward (Posi-Tone, 2013)
- When Words Fail (Motema, 2014)
- Wake Up Call (Ropeadope, 2017)

With The Cookers

- Warriors (Jazz Legacy Productions, 2010)
- Cast The First Stone (Plus Loin Music/Harmonia Mundi, 2011)
- Believe (Motéma Music, 2012)
- Time And Time Again (Motéma Music, 2014)
- The Call Of The Wild And Peaceful Heart (Smoke Sessions, 2016)
- Look Out! (Gearbox, 2021)

With New Jazz Composers Octet

- First Steps Into Reality (Fresh Sound, 1999)
- Walkin' The Line (Fresh Sound, 2002)

=== As sideman ===
- Tom Harrell, Time's Mirror (RCA Victor, 1999)
- Freddie Hubbard, New Colors (Hip Bop, 2001)
- Freddie Hubbard, On the Real Side (Four Quarters, 2008)
- Odean Pope, Odeans List (In+Out, 2009)
- Charles Tolliver, With Love (Blue Note, 2006)
