= On the Real Side =

Studio album by Freddie Hubbard
- Released: June 10, 2008
- Recorded: December 19–20, 2007
- Studio: Bennett Studios, Englewood, NJ
- Genre: Jazz
- Length: 52:25
- Label: Times Square FQT-CD-1810
- Producer: Yusuf Gandhi, David Weiss

Freddie Hubbard chronology
New Colors (2001)	On the Real Side (2008)

Professional ratings
Review scores
Source	Rating
AllMusic	3.5/5 stars

On the Real Side is the final studio album recorded by American jazz musician Freddie Hubbard. The album was recorded in 2007 in Englewood, NJ to celebrate his 70th birthday in 2008 and released on the Times Square label in the same year as his milestone birthday and his subsequent death in the winter.

== Reception ==
George Kanzler of Jazz Times noted "This CD is an example of that dynamic at play in jazz. A decade ago, legendary trumpeter Freddie Hubbard’s playing career seemed shot, as he’d burned out his lip and couldn’t sustain the firebrand style that had always been his trademark, especially not in the small-group format".

Graham L. Flanagan of All About Jazz wrote "While he certainly doesn't possess the fiery, octave-defying magic heard on early Blue Note dates, Hubbard still blows with the same passion and inspiration that cemented his reputation all those years ago. His solos usually last for little more than a few choruses, but this album is a true collaboration among a large gathering of talented musicians; ... This final taste of Hubbard's genius reveals a man who refused to give in to whatever physical limitations he may have been forced to endure, responding with nothing but perseverance for the sake of artistry. Freddie Hubbard will be missed, but his monumental musical legacy will live on forever."

== Track listing ==
1. "Lifeflight" - 8:44
2. "Up Jumped Spring" - 7:07
3. "Theme for Kareem" - 6:35
4. "On the Real Side" - 6:25
5. "Take It to the Ozone" - 7:37
6. "Skydive" - 9:37
7. "Gibraltar" - 6:20

All compositions by Freddie Hubbard

== Personnel ==
- Freddie Hubbard – flugelhorn
- David Weiss – trumpet
- Myron Walden – alto saxophone
- Jimmy Greene – tenor and soprano saxophone
- Steve Davis – trombone
- Norbert Stachel – baritone saxophone and flute
- Xavier Davis – piano
- Dwayne Burno – upright bass
- E.J. Strickland – drums
- Craig Handy – tenor saxophone on 3 & 5 only and flute on 2 only
- Russell Malone – guitar on 4 only
