= Straight Up (Bob James album) =

Studio album by Bob James
- Released: May 18, 1996
- Recorded: December 20 & 21, 1995
- Studios: Power Station (New York City); Hit Factory (New York City)
- Genre: Jazz
- Length: 54:27
- Label: Warner Bros. Records
- Producer: Matt Pierson

Bob James chronology
Restless (1994)	Straight Up (1996)	Playin' Hooky (1997)

Straight Up is Bob James' 24th album. It was recorded on December 20 and 21, 1995, and released on May 28, 1996.

== Critical reception ==
Professional ratings
Review scores
Source	Rating
AllMusic	4.5/5 stars
Los Angeles Times	2/4 stars

Scott Yanow of AllMusic concludes, "With (Christian) McBride and (Brian) Blade contributing consistently stimulating interplay, Bob James has recorded what is certainly the finest jazz album of his career."

Don Heckman of the Los Angeles Times gives this album 2 out of a possible 4 stars and concludes his review with, "this is still not the jazz outing that, somewhere, somehow, he is capable of making."

== Track listing ==
All tracks are written by Bob James, unless otherwise noted.

No.	Title	Writer(s)	Length
1.	"Nightcrawler"		4:42
2.	"Ambrosia"		6:29
3.	"James"	Pat Metheny; Lyle Mays	4:53
4.	"The Jody Grind"	Horace Silver	7:09
5.	"Lost April"	Eddie DeLange; Hubert Spencer; Emil Newman	5:38
6.	"Three Mice Blind"		7:19
7.	"Hockney"		6:10
8.	"Shooting Stars"		6:21
9.	"Quiet Now"	Denny Zeitlin	5:46
Total length:			54:27

== Musicians ==
- Bob James – grand piano
- Christian McBride – bass
- Brian Blade – drums

== Production ==
- Matt Pierson – producer
- James Farber – recording, mixing
- Ken Freeman – additional engineer
- Glen Marchese – assistant engineer
- Rory Romano – assistant engineer
- Greg Calbi – mastering at Sterling Sound (New York, NY)
- Dana Watson – production coordinator
- Linda Cobb – art direction, design
- Bob James – art direction, design
- Herman Leonard – photography
- Jeffrey Scales – photography

Track information and credits adapted the album's liner notes.

== Charts ==
Chart (1996)	Peak position
Traditional Jazz Albums (Billboard)	6
Jazz Albums (Billboard)	20
