= Brian Blade Fellowship (album) =

Studio album by Brian Blade
- Released: 1998
- Genre: Jazz
- Length: 61:43
- Label: Blue Note
- Producer: Daniel Lanois

Brian Blade chronology
| Brian Blade Fellowship (1998) | Perceptual (2000) |

Brian Blade Fellowship is the debut studio album by Brian Blade Fellowship, released in 1998. It was produced by Daniel Lanois.

== Critical reception ==
Professional ratings
Review scores
| Source | Rating |
|---|---|
| AllMusic | 4/5 stars |
| Los Angeles Daily News | 2.5/4 stars |

The Los Angeles Daily News wrote that "the disc starts off strong with three evocative cuts ... but runs out of steam soon afterward and heads for smooth-jazz territory."

== Track listing ==
All tracks composed by Brian Blade; except where indicated

1. "Red River Revel" – 9:29
2. "The Undertow" – 7:26
3. "Folklore" – 11:05
4. "In Spite of Everything" – 4:20
5. "Lifeline" (Jon Cowherd) – 7:44
6. "Mohave" – 9:08
7. "If You See Lurah" – 4:31
8. "Loving Without Asking" – 8:00

== Personnel ==
- Brian Blade – drums
- Melvin Butler – soprano and tenor saxophones
- Jon Cowherd – piano, Wurlitzer
- Dave Easley – pedal steel guitar
- Daniel Lanois – mando guitar
- Jeff Parker - acoustic and electric guitar
- Christopher Thomas – acoustic bass
- Myron Walden – alto saxophone
