= New Colors =

Studio album by Freddie Hubbard
- Released: April 24, 2001
- Recorded: October 18–December 4, 2000
- Genre: Jazz
- Label: Hip Bop Essence
- Producer: Yusuf Gandhi, Reynold da Silva, Freddie Hubbard

Freddie Hubbard chronology
MMTC: Monk, Miles, Trane & Cannon (1995)	New Colors (2001)	On the Real Side (2008)

Professional ratings
Review scores
Source	Rating
Allmusic	4/5 stars
The Penguin Guide to Jazz Recordings	2.5/4 stars

New Colors is an album by jazz musician Freddie Hubbard recorded in 2000 and released on the Hip Bop Essence label in 2001.

It was the second of Hubbard’s albums to be recorded after his debilitating lip injury in the early 1990s.

== Track listing ==
1. "One of Another Kind" - 8:00
2. "Blue Spirits" - 9:03
3. "Blues for Miles" - 6:31
4. "Dizzy's Connotations" - 8:43
5. "True Colors" - 5:06
6. "Red Clay" - 8:19
7. "Osie Mae" - 6:09
8. "Inner Space" (Corea) - 7:45

All compositions by Freddie Hubbard except as indicated

== Personnel ==
- Freddie Hubbard - flugelhorn
- David Weiss - trumpet
- Craig Handy - tenor and soprano saxophone
- Myron Walden - alto saxophone on 1, 2, 5 & 8 only
- Ted Nash - alto saxophone on 3, 4, 6 & 7 only
- Luis Bonilla - trombone
- Chris Karlic - baritone saxophone
- Xavier Davis - piano
- Dwayne Burno - bass
- Joe Chambers - drums on 1, 2, 5 & 8 only
- Idris Muhammad - drums on 3, 4, 6 & 7 only
- Steve Davis - trombone on 8 only
- Kenny Garrett - alto saxophone on 3 only
- Javon Jackson - tenor saxophone on 4 only
