= Alyssa Graham =

American singer-songwriter

- Born: Alyssa Hope Altschul
- Genres: Pop, folk, jazz
- Occupations: Singer, songwriter
- Instruments: Vocals, guitar
- Years active: 2005–present
- Label: Sunnyside
- Website: www.alyssagraham.com

Alyssa Graham (born Alyssa Hope Altschul) is an American singer-songwriter. In 2005, she launched her solo music career with the release of the album, What Love Is, which was heralded by All About Jazz as one of the Best New Recordings of 2005.

== Music career ==
Born and raised in a small town outside of New York City, Graham is the daughter of Jewish-American parents Susan and Fredric Altschul who were greatly influenced by the New York City art scene and the 1960s music revolution. She is the sister of American fiction writer and political commentator, Andrew Foster Altschul. Her grandfather was an Emmy-nominated actor and radio personality during the Golden Age of Radio, most famous for his work on Gangbusters, Yours Truly, Johnny Dollar, and Mystery Theater.

In the 1990s, Graham got her start in music when she and longtime boyfriend and songwriter, Doug Graham, co-founded a psychedelic rock band called Blindman's Holiday while she was a student at Ithaca College. She and her bandmates were featured in Entertainment magazine as one of the best college bands in the country.

After five years with Blindman's Holiday, Graham moved to Boston to study jazz and contemporary improvisation at the New England Conservatory of Music. She and Doug Graham got married and started performing a mixture of jazz and pop music as a duo in Boston and New York City clubs like Club Passim and The Bitter End.

In 2003, the Grahams moved back to New York City and immersed themselves in the underground jazz and singer-songwriter scene, playing with local musicians at venues such as Rockwood Music Hall, Joe's Pub, and The Cutting Room.

On July 25, 2011, Sunnyside Records announced the release of The Lock, Stock & Soul, produced by Grammy-winner Craig Street.

== Critical reception ==
Gramah's album Echo (2008) was critically acclaimed and commercially successful, debuting at No. 24 on the Billboard contemporary jazz charts. The New York Times named Echo a Critics' Choice CD and iTunes named it one of the Top 10 Vocal Albums of the Year. Echo was featured in ELLE magazine and NPR called it "poignant...openhearted."

Graham was recognized by Amazon as one of their "New and Notable Artists" and made musical history as the first singer to record the track "Involved Again," written by Jack Reardon for Billie Holiday in the 1950s.

American Songwriter named her Writer of the Week in May 2012.
