= Lizz Wright =

American jazz and gospel singer (born 1980)

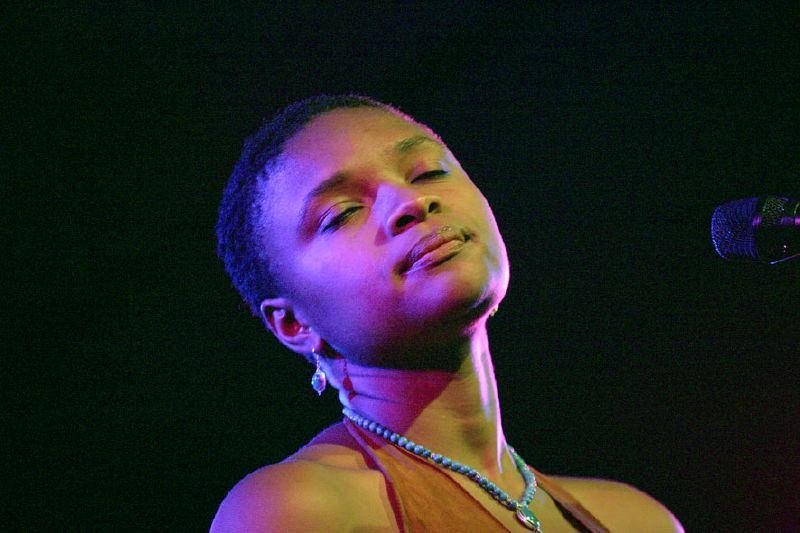

Background information
- Born: Elizabeth LaCharla Wright; January 22, 1980 (age 46); Hahira, Georgia, U.S.
- Genres: Jazz; gospel; blues
- Occupations: Singer; songwriter
- Labels: Concord, Verve, Blues & Greens
- Website: lizzwright.net

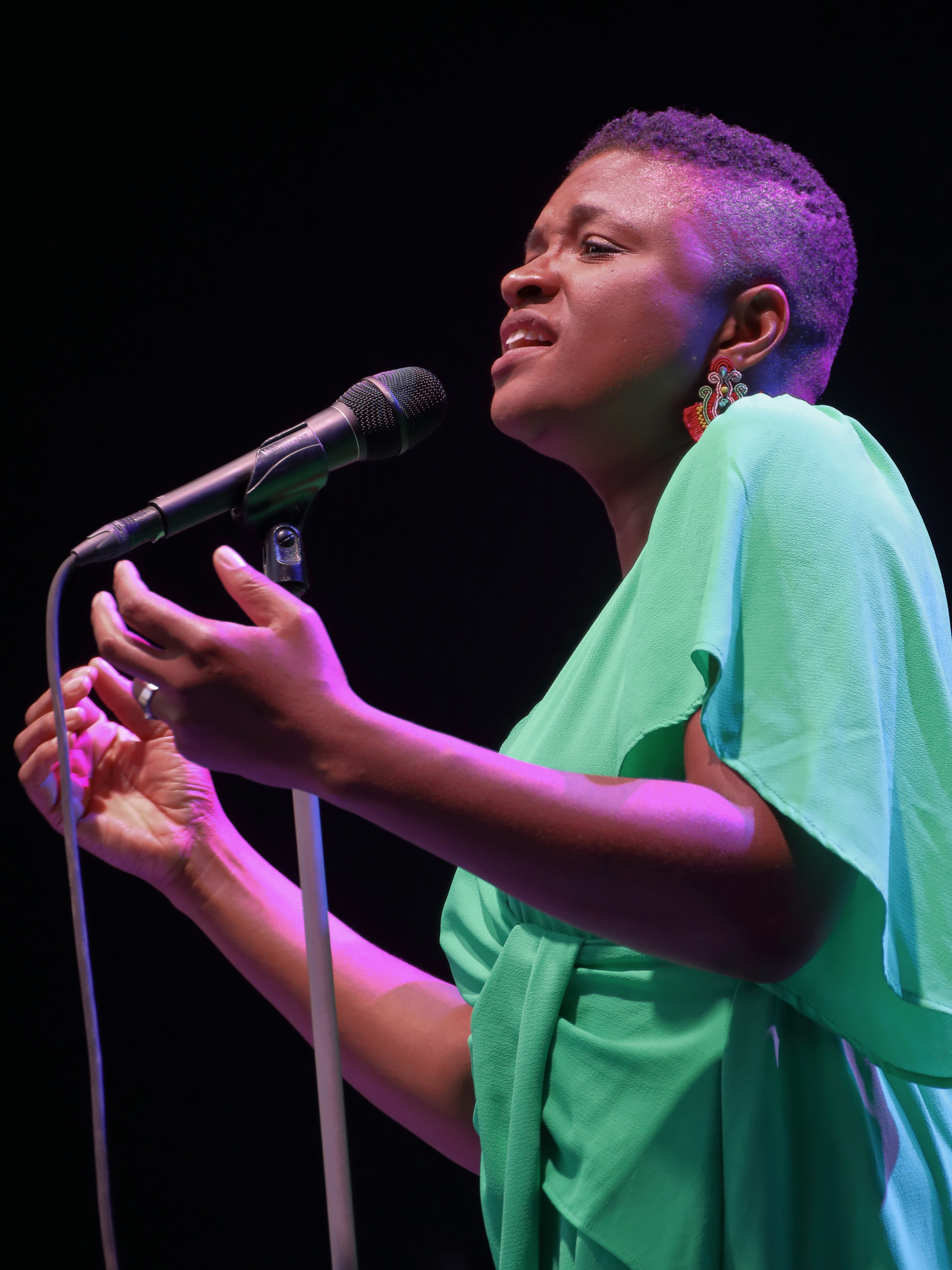
Lizz Wright at Rudolstadt Festival 2019 in Germany

Elizabeth LaCharla Wright (born January 22, 1980) professionally known as Lizz Wright, is an American jazz and gospel singer.

== Early life and education ==
Wright was born in the small town of Hahira, which is northwest of Valdosta, Georgia, United States, one of three children and the daughter of a minister and the musical director of their church. She started singing gospel music and playing piano in church as a child, and became interested in jazz and blues. She attended Houston County High School in Warner Robins, Georgia, where she was in choral singing and received the National Choral Award. She went to Georgia State University in Atlanta to study singing. Then she studied at The New School in New York and in Vancouver, BC.

== Career ==
Wright joined the In the Spirit in 2000, a vocal quartet based in Atlanta; in 2002 she signed a recording contract with Verve Records. Her musical compositions and vocal style have led to her being compared to Norah Jones.

Her first album, Salt, was released in the spring of 2003 and reached No. 2 on the Billboard Top Contemporary Jazz chart in 2004. Her next release was a jazz and pop blend incorporating folk music. Dreaming Wide Awake was released in June 2005 and was No. 1 on the Top Contemporary Jazz chart in 2005 and 2006. In 2008, Wright released The Orchard to positive reviews. She released her fourth album, Fellowship, in 2010. Most of the songs on Fellowship are gospel standards.

== Personal life ==
Wright is married to arts administrator Monica Haslip.

== Discography ==
- Salt (Verve, 2003)
- Dreaming Wide Awake (Verve Forecast, 2005)
- The Orchard (Verve Forecast, 2008)
- Fellowship (Verve Forecast, 2010)
- Freedom & Surrender (Concord, 2015)
- Grace (Concord, 2017)
- Holding Space (Live in Berlin) (Blues & Greens, 2022)
- Shadow (Blues & Greens/Virgin, 2024)
- Nearness (Blues & Greens/Candid, 2026)

=== As guest ===
- "No One but Myself to Blame" and "Fool's Gold" on The Pecan Tree by Joe Sample (2002)
- "...Till Then" and "The Fiddle and the Drum" on ...Till Then by Danilo Pérez (2003)
- "Don't Let Me Be Lonely Tonight" on Closer by David Sanborn (2005)
- "Come Rain or Come Shine" on One More for the Road by Toots Thielemans (2006)
- "Freedom" (backing vocals) on Supply and Demand by Amos Lee (2006)
- "Reaching for the Moon" with Regina Carter and Russell Malone on We All Love Ella: Celebrating the First Lady of Song (2007)
- "Whispering Pines", a duet with Jakob Dylan produced by Joe Henry for Endless Highway: The Music of The Band (2007)
- "Stillness: Winterhouse" on Persona by Massimo Biolcati (2008)
- "I Wish I Knew (How It Feels to Be Free)" with pianist Takana Miyamoto and Marcus Printup on Promises Made: The Millennium Promise Jazz Project produced by Kirk Whalum (2008)
- "A Change Is Gonna Come" on Nordstrom's The Royal Blues: Celebrating the Queens of Blues and Jazz (2009)
- "Nobody's Fault but Mine" on Pour une âme souveraine: A Dedication to Nina Simone by Meshell Ndegeocello (2012)
- "Backward Country Boy Blues" by Duke Ellington on Terri Lyne Carrington's Money Jungle: Provocative in Blue (2013)
- "When I Found You" by Patrice Rushen on Terri Lyne Carrington's The Mosaic Project: Love and Soul (2015)
- "This Song in Me", co-written by Wright with producer Derrick Hodge for We Are the Drum by Kendrick Scott Oracle (2015)
- "Om Sweet Om" on Taj Mo by Taj Mahal and Keb' Mo' (2017)
- "Take Me Home" by José James for his album No Beginning No End 2 (2020)

== Sources and external links ==
- Official website
- "Portrait of the artist: Lizz Wright, singer", interview by Laura Barnett, The Guardian, 22 April 2008.
