= Beautiful Life (Jimmy Greene album) =

Studio album by Jimmy Greene
- Released: November 25, 2014
- Genre: Jazz, gospel, post-bop, neo-bop
- Length: 49:02
- Label: Mack Avenue
- Producer: Greene

Beautiful Life is the eighth studio album from Jimmy Greene. Mack Avenue Records released the album on November 25, 2014. Greene dedicated the album to his daughter, Ana Grace Márquez-Greene, who was murdered in the Sandy Hook Elementary School shooting.

== Critical reception ==
Professional ratings
Review scores
Source	Rating
AllMusic	4.5/5 stars
All About Jazz	5/5 stars
The Irish Times	4/5 stars

Reviewing the album from The New York Times, Nate Chinen describes, "there's...a quiet resilience in those songs". Marcus Chilton, writing a review at The Daily Telegraph, replies, "Beautiful Life is a remarkable tribute". Awarding the album four and a half stars at AllMusic, Matt Collar states, "Greene transforms his personal anguish into something that's as inspirational to the soul as it is beautiful to the ears." Larkin Corman, rating the album four stars from The Irish Times, writes, "Even without the context, this would be a beautiful recording; knowing the background, one cannot but be humbled by its generosity." Giving the album five stars for All About Jazz, Patricia Myers says, "Greene's album combines jazz with spirituals, contemporary Christian music and ballads, plus three original songs." Jack Goodstein, penning a review at Seattle Post-Intelligencer, responds, "Beautiful Life is an emotionally charged musical celebration of a life too soon lost." Writing a review from the Ottawa Citizen, Peter Hum recognizes, "Totalling about 50 minutes in all, Beautiful Life is a concise album in which every note speaks volumes."

== Track listing ==
No.	Title	Writer(s)	Length
1.	"Saludos/Come Thou Almighty King"	Felice Giardini, Charles Wesley	5:12
2.	"Last Summer"	Jimmy Greene	6:37
3.	"When I Come Home"	Greene	3:21
4.	"Ana's Way"	Greene	7:13
5.	"Your Great Name"	Michael Neale, Krissy Nordhoff	5:20
6.	"Where Is Love?"	Lionel Bart	4:34
7.	"Seventh Candle"	Greene	6:15
8.	"Maybe"	Martin Charnin, Charles Strouse	3:05
9.	"Prayer"	Greene	4:02
10.	"Little Voices"	Greene	3:23
Total length:			49:02

== Personnel ==
- Jimmy Greene – tenor and soprano sax, flute
- Lewis Nash – drums
- Renee Rosnes – piano (tracks 2, 3, 4, 5, 7, 10)
- Isaiah Márquez-Greene – piano (track 1)
- Kenny Barron – piano (tracks 6 and 8)
- Cyrus Chestnut – piano (track 9)
- Pat Metheny – acoustic guitar (track 1)
- Jonathan DuBose – guitar (track 10)
- Christian McBride – bass
- Jeffrey Krieger and Peter Zay – cello (tracks 3 and 9)
- Michael Wheeler and Sharon Dennison – viola (tracks 3 and 9)
- Leonid Sigal, Cyrus Stevens, Karin Fagerburg, Millie Piekos, Yuri Kharenko-Golduber, Candace Lammers, Krzysztof Gadawski, Lu Sun Friedman, Michael Pollard – violins (tracks 3 and 9)
- Javier Colon – vocals (track 3)
- Kurt Elling – vocals (track 4)
- Latanya Farrell – vocals (track 9)
- Ana Márquez-Greene – vocals (track 1)
- Anika Noni Rose – spoken word (track 10)

== Chart performance ==
Chart (2014–15)	Peak position
US Christian Albums (Billboard)	36
US Top Gospel Albums (Billboard)	6
US Heatseekers Albums (Billboard)	6
US Top Jazz Albums (Billboard)	5
