= Öffnet eure Tore =

Christian hymn

- Christian hymn
- English: Open your gates
- Occasion: Feast of the Ascension
- Written: 1810
- Text: by Christoph Bernhard Verspoell
- Language: German
- Based on: Psalm 24
- Melody: by Stephan Lück
- Composed: 1846
- Published: 1846

"Öffnet eure Tore" (Open your gates) is a Christian hymn in German, written by Christoph Bernhard Verspoell for the Feast of the Ascension. The text is based on Psalm 24. While the text was written in Münster in 1810, the melody was composed for a Trier hymnal of 1846. It became part of the regional sections of the German Catholic hymnal Gotteslob.

== History ==
Christoph Bernhard Verspoell was a Catholic priest in Münster during the era of enlightenment, who worked as voice teacher and writer of religious literature. He wrote the text of popular hymns such as "Fest soll mein Taufbund immer stehn" for baptism and the Christmas carol "Menschen, die ihr wart verloren". He wrote the text of "Öffnet eure Tore" as a hymn in German for the Feast of the Ascension, based on Psalm 24. (Note: In the Latin counting, Psalm 24 is psalmus 23.)

The melody was composed by the theologian and later Trier Cathedral conductor Stephan Lück (1806–1883) for the first Trier diocesan hymnal published in 1846.

The song became part of regional sections of the German Catholic hymnal Gotteslob, such as GL 786 in the Diocese of Limburg, and GL 822 in Mainz.

== Theme and text ==
The dialogue of Psalm 24, requesting the gates to open for the King of Glory, have been associated with the ascension of Jesus since the second century, when the Christian philosopher Justin described (in Dialog mit dem Juden Tryphon 36,4–6) a dialogue of heavenly lords who did not recognise Jesus because of his human appearance. Verspoell's hymn had originally four stanzas, two of them a paraphrase of the psalm dialogue. The other two stanzas recognise Jesus as the mighty ruler of the Heavenly Host ("der Engelscharen mächter Herrscher"), and call all nations to join the angels proclaiming him who seemed forsaken on the Cross ("der am Kreuze ganz verlassen hing") but now rules as King of Heaven ("herrscht als Himmelskönig").

In the Trier version of 1955, the last stanzas were first combined to one, omitting a reference to the nativity. It became a model for further editions. In the Mainz version, even the first two stanzas are reduced to one, avoiding allusions to God as mighty in battle. Each stanza is concluded by a threefold Halleluja.

== Melody and music ==
Lück's melody, originally in A major, begins with energy and upward motion, and ends with a festive and jubilant repeated Halleluja. Modern versions turn to lower keys, such as F major in Limburg.
