= List of neo-bop musicians =

Neo-bop as a subgenre emerged within jazz during the early 1980s.

This list is derived from All Music and may contain inaccuracies. In addition the source indicates most or all these musicians work in others genres as well with Post-bop and Hard bop being most common.

== B ==
- Kenny Barbell
- Gary Bartz
- Brian Blade
- Terence Blanchard

== C ==
- James Carter
- Cyrus Chestnut

== D ==
- Ray Drummond

== F ==
- Jon Faddis
- Sonny Fortune

== G ==
- Benny Green
- Jimmy Greene

== H ==
- Roy Hargrove
- Antonio Hart
- John Hicks

== L ==
- Joe Lovano

== M ==
- Russell Malone
- Branford Marsalis
- Wynton Marsalis
- Tarus Mateen
- Christian McBride
- Mulgrew Miller

== P ==
- Nicholas Payton

== R ==
- Joshua Redman
- Eric Reed

== W ==
- Tim Warfield
- Kenny Washington
- Bobby Watson
- Ernie Watts
- Steve Wilson
- Rodney Whitaker
