= Feast of the Ascension =

Christian commemoration

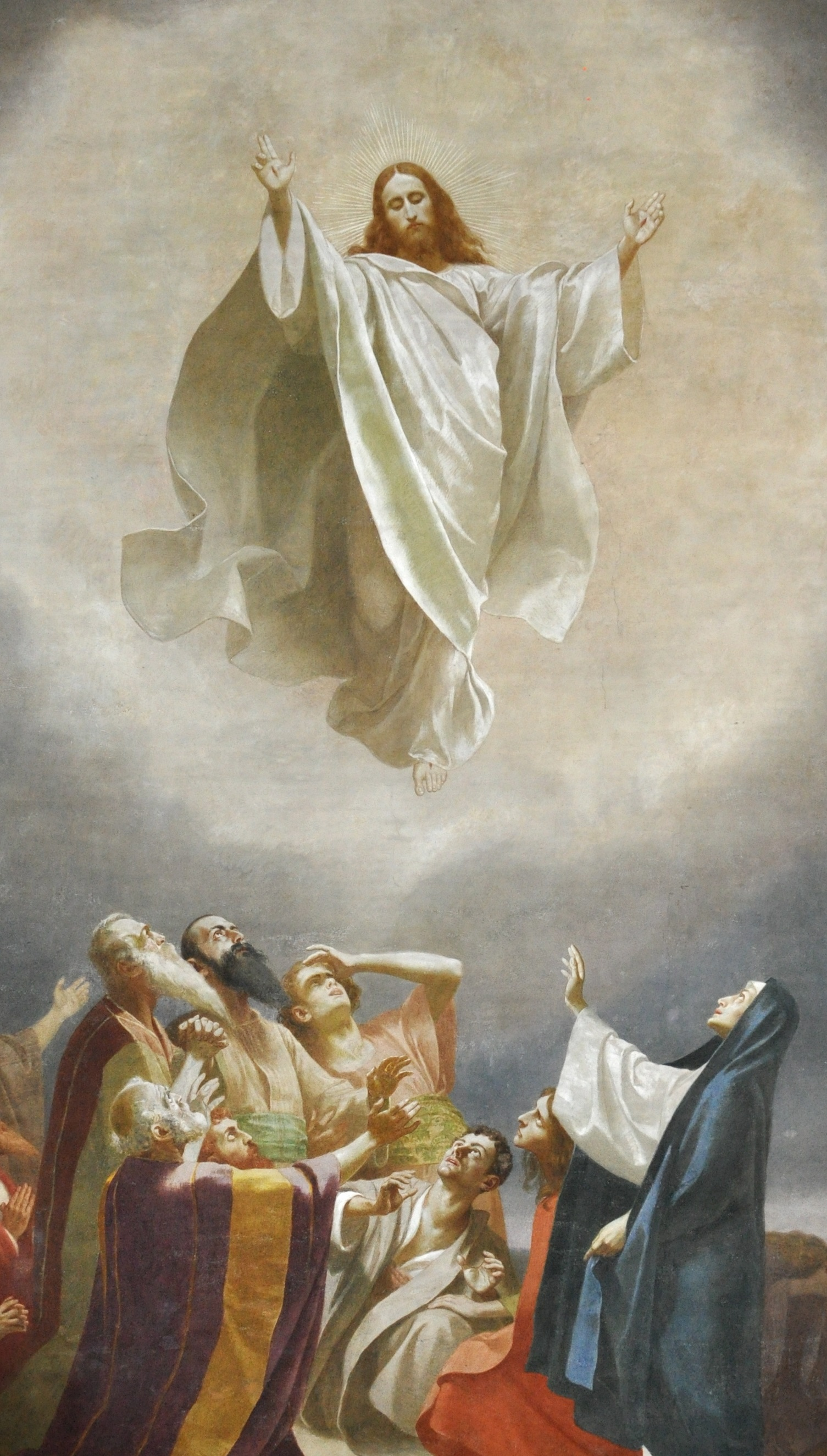
- Christi Himmelfahrt by Gebhard Fugel, c. 1893
- Also called: Ascension Day; Ascension Thursday; Holy Thursday
- Observed by: Catholics, Lutherans, Anglicans, Moravians, Methodists, Eastern Orthodox, Oriental Orthodox
- Type: Christian
- Significance: Commemorates the Ascension of Jesus into Heaven
- Observances: Service of Worship / Mass
- Date: 39 days after Easter
- 2025 date: May 29 (Western); May 29 (Eastern)
- 2026 date: May 14 (Western); May 21 (Eastern)
- 2027 date: May 6 (Western); June 10 (Eastern)
- 2028 date: May 25 (Western); May 25 (Eastern)
- Frequency: annual
- Related to: Easter, Pentecost

The Feast of the Ascension of Jesus Christ (also called the Solemnity of the Ascension of the Lord, Ascension Day, Ascension Thursday; or sometimes Holy Thursday, which can also mean the Thursday before Easter) commemorates the Christian belief of the bodily Ascension of Jesus into Heaven. It is one of the ecumenical (shared by multiple denominations) feasts of Christian churches, ranking with the feasts of the Passion and Pentecost. Following the account of Acts 1:3 that the risen Jesus appeared for 40 days prior to his Ascension, Ascension Day is traditionally celebrated on a Thursday, the fortieth day of Easter according to inclusive counting, although some Christian denominations have moved the observance to the following Sunday, sometimes called Ascension Sunday. The day of observance varies by ecclesiastical province in many Christian denominations, as with Catholics and Lutherans, for example.

Ascensiontide refers to the ten-day period between the Feast of the Ascension and the Feast of Pentecost. The Sunday within that period may be referred to as the Seventh Sunday of Easter or the Sunday in Ascensiontide.

== History ==
The observance of this feast is of great antiquity. Eusebius seems to hint at the celebration of it in the 4th century. At the beginning of the 5th century, Augustine of Hippo says that it is of Apostolic origin, and he speaks of it in a way that shows it was the universal observance of the Catholic Church long before his time. Frequent mention of it is made in the writings of John Chrysostom, Gregory of Nyssa, and in the Constitution of the Apostles. The Pilgrimage of Aetheria speaks of the vigil of this feast and of the feast itself, as they were kept in the church built over the grotto in Bethlehem in which Christ is traditionally regarded as having been born. It may be that prior to the 5th century the event narrated in the Gospels was commemorated in conjunction with the feast of Easter or Pentecost. Some believe that the much-disputed forty-third decree of the Synod of Elvira (c. 300) condemning the practice of observing a feast on the fortieth day after Easter and neglecting to keep Pentecost on the fiftieth day, implies that the proper usage of the time was to commemorate the Ascension along with Pentecost. Representations of the mystery are found in diptychs and frescoes dating as early as the 5th century. Hymns for this feast are found in the Georgian Chantbook of Jerusalem, which contains material composed during the 5th century.

== In Western Christianity ==
The Latin terms used for the feast, ascensio and, occasionally, ascensa, signify that Christ was raised up by his own powers, and it is from these terms that the holy day gets its name. In the Book of Common Prayer of the Anglican Communion, "Holy Thursday" is listed as another name for Ascension Day. William Blake's poem "Holy Thursday" refers to Ascension Day; Thomas Pruen used the term to refer to Ascension Day in his Illustration of the Liturgy of the Church of England, published in 1820; however use of the term "Holy Thursday" to mean Ascension Day is rare, and the term is more generally applied by most Christian denominations to Maundy Thursday in Holy Week.

In Western Christianity, the earliest possible date is 30 April (as in 1818 and 2285), or 1 May in some centuries (such as the 20th, 21st, and 22nd), while the latest possible date is 3 June (as in 1943 and 2038). In the Catholic Church, the Ascension of the Lord is ranked as a Solemnity and is a Holy Day of Obligation. In the Lutheran Churches, the Feast of the Ascension is a feast. In the Anglican Communion, Ascension Day is a Principal Feast.

The three days before Ascension Thursday are sometimes referred to as the Rogation days, and the previous Sunday—the Sixth Sunday of Easter (or the Fifth Sunday after Easter)—as Rogation Sunday.

Ascension has a vigil and, since the 15th century, an octave, which is set apart for a novena of preparation for Pentecost. In the Book of Common Prayer of the Church of England the Sunday following Ascension Day is called the Sunday after the Ascension. For Anglo-Catholics Ascension Day is a double of the 1st class with a privileged octave of the third order.

In traditional Methodist usage, The Book of Worship for Church and Home (1965) provides the following Collect for Ascension Day, commonly called Holy Thursday:

Almighty God, whose blessed Son our Saviour Jesus Christ ascended far above all heavens, that he might fill all things: Mercifully give us faith to perceive that according to his promise he abideth with his Church on earth, even unto the end of the world; through the same thy Son Jesus Christ our Lord. Amen.

=== Sunday observance ===
Dates for Ascension Day 2019–2033 In Gregorian dates
Year	Western	Eastern	Western
Year	Thursday		Sunday
2019	May 30	June 6	June 2
2020	May 21	May 28	May 24
2021	May 13	June 10	May 16
2022	May 26	June 2	May 29
2023	May 18	May 25	May 21
2024	May 9	June 13	May 12
2025	May 29		June 1
2026	May 14	May 21	May 17
2027	May 6	June 10	May 9
2028	May 25		May 28
2029	May 10	May 17	May 13
2030	May 30	June 6	June 2
2031	May 22		May 25
2032	May 6	June 10	May 9
2033	May 26	June 2	May 29

Catholic parishes in a number of countries that do not observe the feast as a public holiday have obtained permission from the Vatican to move observance of the Feast of the Ascension from the traditional Thursday to the following Sunday, the Sunday before Pentecost. Similarly, the United Methodist Church allows the traditional celebration on Holy Thursday to be moved to Sunday. This is in keeping with a trend to move Holy Days of Obligation from weekdays to Sunday, to encourage more Christians to observe feasts considered important. The decision to move a feast is made by each Conference of Catholic Bishops with prior approval of the Apostolic See. In some cases the Conference may delegate the determination for specific feasts to the bishops of an ecclesiastical province within the conference, i.e. an archbishop and the neighbouring bishops.

The switch to Sunday was made in 1992 by the Conference of Catholic Bishops in Australia; before 1996 in parts of Europe; in 1997 in Ireland; before 1998 in Canada and parts of the western United States; in many other parts of the United States from 1999; and in England and Wales from 2007 to 2017, but from 2018 its celebration on the Thursday was reinstated, at the same time as the feast of the Epiphany was transferred back to the 6 January from the following Sunday. In the U.S., the determination of whether to move Ascension was delegated to the provinces by the USCCB: the ecclesiastical provinces which retain Thursday observance in 2022 are Boston, Hartford, New York, Omaha, Philadelphia, and the Personal Ordinariate of the Chair of Saint Peter. When celebrated on a Sunday, the earliest possible date is 3 May, and the latest is 6 June.

== In Eastern and Oriental Orthodox Christianity ==
In the Eastern Church this feast is known in Greek as Analepsis, the "taking up", and also as the Episozomene, the "salvation from on high", denoting that by ascending into his glory Christ completed the work of our redemption. Ascension is one of the Twelve Great Feasts of the Orthodox liturgical year.

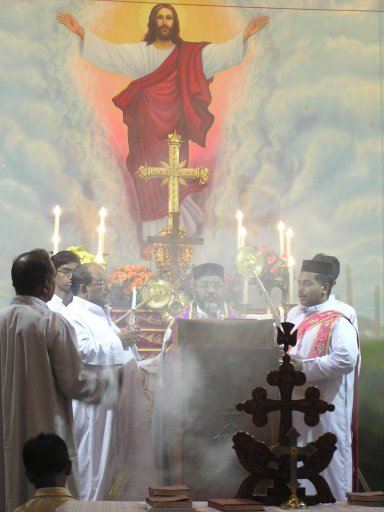
Liturgy during the Feast of the Ascension in a Mumbai Syriac Orthodox Church

=== Celebration ===
The feast is always observed with an All-night vigil. The day before is the Apodosis (leave-taking) of Easter (i.e., the last day of the Feast of Easter). Before the Vigil, the Paschal Hours are said for the last time and the Paschal greeting is exchanged.

The Paroemia (Old Testament readings) at Vespers on the eve of the Feast are Isaiah 2:2–3; Isaiah 62:10–63:3, 63:7–9; and Zechariah 14:1–4, 14:8–11. A Lity is celebrated. The troparion of the day is sung, which says:

You have ascended in glory,
O Christ our God,
Granting joy to your disciples
by the promise of the Holy Spirit.
Through the blessing they were assured
that you are the Son,
the Redeemer of the world!

During the Polyeleos at Matins, the Epitaphios, which was placed on the altar on Holy Saturday (either at Matins or the Midnight Office, depending on local custom) is taken from the altar and carried in procession around the church. It is then put in the place reserved for it. The Gospel is Mark 16:9–20. The kontakion is sung, which announces:

When Thou didst fulfill the dispensation for our sake,
and unite earth to heaven:
Thou didst ascend in glory, O Christ our God,
not being parted from those who love Thee,
but remaining with them and crying:
I am with you and no one will be against you!

The megalynarion and irmos from Ode IX of the Canon (also sung at liturgy) is:

Magnify, O my soul, Christ the Giver of Life,
Who has ascended from earth to heaven!
We magnify you, the Mother of God,
Who beyond reason and understanding
gave birth in time to the Timeless One.

At the Divine Liturgy, special antiphons are sung in place of Psalms 102 and 145 and the Beatitudes. The Epistle is Acts 1:1–12, and the Gospel is Luke 24:36–53.

=== Observance ===
Ascension Thursday also commemorates the Holy Georgian Martyrs of Persia (17th–18th centuries).

Ascension has an Afterfeast of eight days. The Sunday after Ascension is the Sunday of the Holy Fathers of the First Ecumenical Council at Nicaea. This council formulated the Nicene Creed up to the words, "He (Jesus) ascended into heaven, and sits at the right hand of the Father; and shall come again, with glory, to judge the living and the dead; Whose kingdom shall have no end." The Afterfeast ends on the following Friday, the Friday before Pentecost. The next day is appropriately a Saturday of the Dead (general commemoration of all faithful departed).

The Eastern Orthodox Church uses a different method of calculating the date of Easter, so the Eastern Orthodox commemoration of Ascension will usually be after the western observance (either one week, or four weeks, or five weeks later; but occasionally on the same day). The earliest possible date for the feast is 13 May (of the Western calendar), and the latest possible date is 16 June. Some of the Oriental Orthodox Churches, however, observe Ascension on the same date as the Western Churches.

== Music ==
The feast has been associated with specific hymns and other church music. The oldest hymn in German related to the feast is the Leise "Christ fuhr gen Himmel", first published in 1480. Johann Sebastian Bach composed several cantatas and the Ascension Oratorio to be performed in church services on the feast day. He first performed Wer da gläubet und getauft wird, BWV 37, on 18 May 1724, Auf Christi Himmelfahrt allein, BWV 128, on 10 May 1725, Gott fähret auf mit Jauchzen, BWV 43, on 30 May 1726 and the oratorio, Lobet Gott in seinen Reichen, BWV 11, on 19 May 1735.

Many Messianic psalms are used at the feast of Ascension including Psalm 24, Psalm 47 and Psalm 68. The dialogue "Lift up your heads, O ye gates" from Psalm 24 (verses 7–10) has inspired Handel's setting in Part II of his Messiah in the scene "Ascension", and Christoph Bernhard Verspoell's 1810 hymn in German, "Öffnet eure Tore". Phillip Moore's anthem The Ascension sets words based on the same verses.

Olivier Messiaen wrote an orchestral suite, later partly transcribed for organ, called L'Ascension in the 1930s.

Settings of "God is gone up" have been composed by William Croft, Arthur Hutchings and Gerald Finzi (words by Edward Taylor). Other settings suitable for the occasion include William Matthias's Lift up your heads. "Im Himmel hoch verherrlicht ist" (Highly gloryfied in Heaven) is a 1973 hymn in German for the occasion.

The RSCM has produced an extensive list of music (including hymns, anthems and organ music) suitable for Ascension.

== See also ==
- Ascension of Jesus in Christian art
- Feast of the Transfiguration
- Nusardil
