= Wahrer Gott, wir glauben dir =

- German Catholic hymn by Christoph Bernhard Verspoell
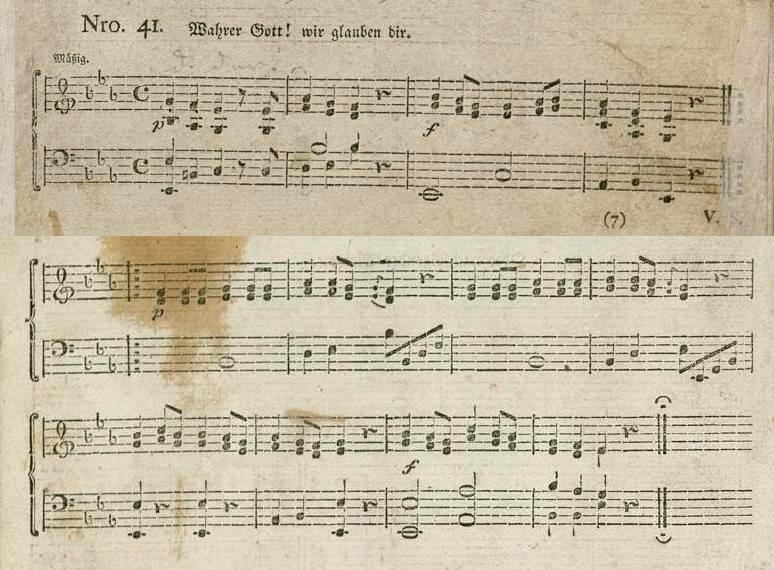
- "Wahrer Gott, wir glauben dir", melody with organ accompaniment
- English: True God, we believe You
- Occasion: Eastertide; Eucharist
- Language: German
- Published: 1810

"Wahrer Gott, wir glauben dir" (True God, we believe You) is a Catholic hymn. Christoph Bernhard Verspoell (1743–1818), a cleric from Münster, wrote text and melody, and published it in 1810 in his hymnal Orgelbegleitung zu den Gesängen beym Römisch-kathol. Gottesdienste. Herausgegeben von C. B. Verspoell (Organ accompaniment to the chants in the Roman Catholic service. Edited by C. B. Verspoell). The song in two stanzas has remained in the repertory of church hymns, used mainly during Eastertide, but also for communion and funerals. It appears in several regional sections of the Catholic hymnal Gotteslob, as GL 770 in Cologne, as GL 780 in Limburg and Münster, and as GL 783 in Speyer, among others.

== Text ==
Wahrer Gott, wir glauben dir,
du bist mit Gottheit und Menschheit hier;
du, der den Satan und Tod überwand,
der im Triumph aus dem Grabe erstand.
Preis dir, du Sieger auf Golgatha,
Sieger, wie keiner, alleluja.

Jesu, dir jauchzt alles zu:
Herr über Leben und Tod bist du.
In deinem Blute gereinigt von Schuld,
freun wir uns wieder der göttlichen Huld.
Gib, dass wir stets deine Wege geh'n,
glorreich wie du aus dem Grabe ersteh'n!

The topic of the hymn is the resurrection of Jesus, who is acclaimed as Lord of Life and Death who cleaned from debt. The second line, "du bist mit Gottheit und Menschheit hier" (You are here as God and Man), alludes to the presence of Jesus in the eucharist, which makes the song suitable for eucharistic adoration, such as Corpus Christi processions.

== Tune ==
Source: Christoph Bernhard Verspoell, Münster 1810

== Literature ==
- Gesänge beim römischkatholischen Gottesdienste, nebst angehängtem Gebethbuche, ed. C. B. Verspoell, Aschendorff, Münster 1829: p. 55, p. 56.
