= Im Himmel hoch verherrlicht ist =

Christian hymn

"lm Himmel hoch verherrlicht ist"
- Christian hymn
- English: Highly gloryfied in Heaven
- Occasion: Feast of the Ascension
- Written: 1973
- Language: German
- Melody: from Konstanz
- Composed: 1613
- Published: 1973

"lm Himmel hoch verherrlicht ist" (Highly gloryfied in Heaven) is a Christian hymn in German for the Feast of the Ascension. The German text appeared in Mainz, and the melody in Konstanz in 1613. It became part of regional sections of the German Catholic hymnal Gotteslob.

== History ==
"lm Himmel hoch verherrlicht ist" is a hymn in German for the Feast of the Ascension. The text appeared in Mainz in 1973, while the melody appeared in Konstanz in 1613. Each line is closed by Halleluja.

The song became part of regional sections of the first German Catholic hymnal Gotteslob in 1975, such as 833 in the Diocese of Limburg where it was retained in the second edition as GL 785.
