= Machet die Tore weit (Hammerschmidt) =

- Motet by Andreas Hammerschmidt
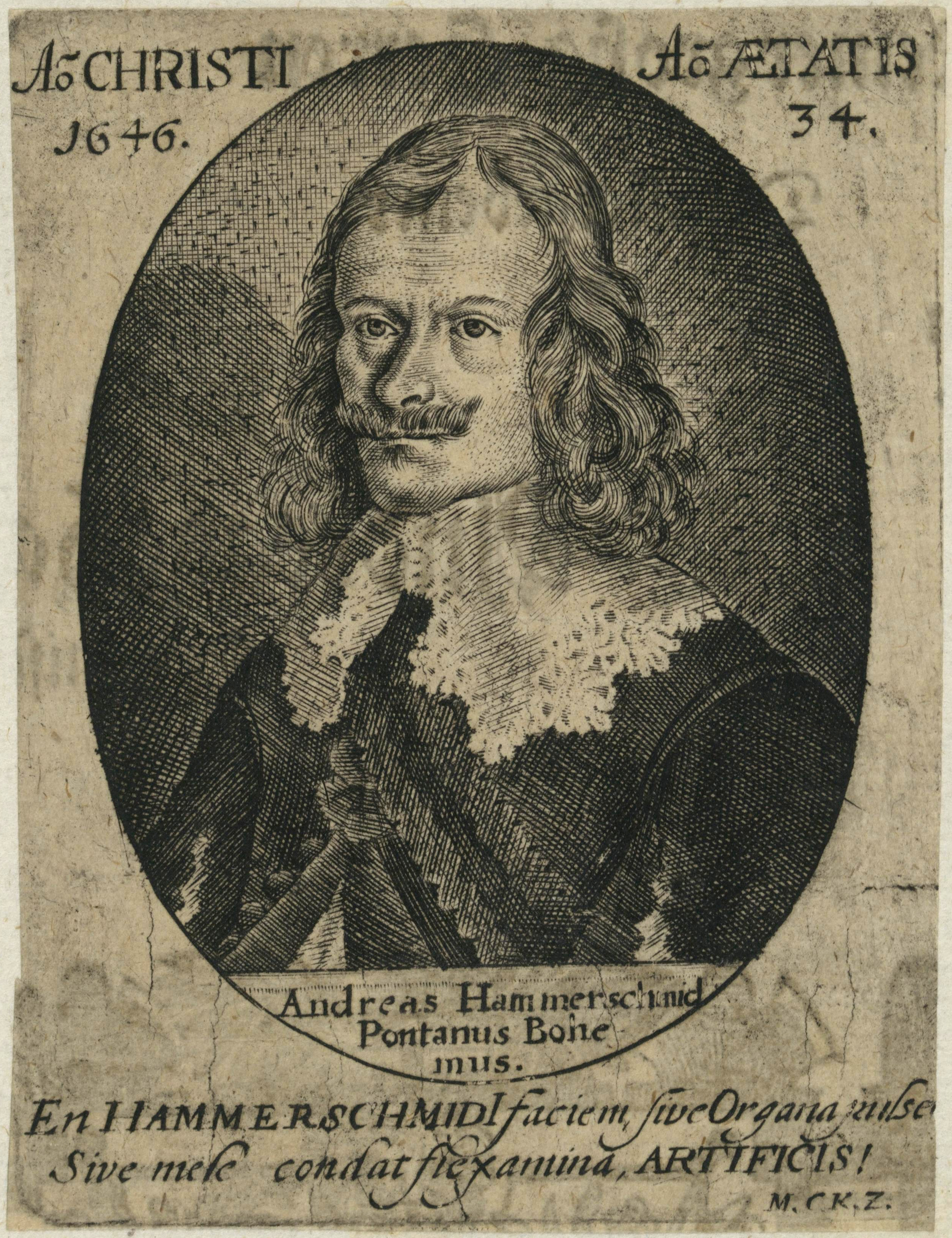
- English: Make the gates wide
- Occasion: Advent
- Text: verses from Psalm 24
- Language: German
- Published: 1967
- Scoring: SSATTB choir

Machet die Tore weit (German for: Make the gates wide) is a motet for Advent by Andreas Hammerschmidt. He set verses from Psalm 24 in German for six unaccompanied voices, concluded by an extended "Osianna".

== History and music ==
Hammerschmidt set composed the motet, setting verses 7–10 from Psalm 24 in German, in the translation of the Bible by Martin Luther, in English beginning: "Lift up your heads, O ye gates; and be ye lift up, ye everlasting doors; and the King of glory shall come in. Who is this King of glory? The LORD strong and mighty, the LORD mighty in battle." (Psalms 24:7-10). The motet is scored for six vocal parts, SSATTB.

In a middle section, the questions and answers are given to two subchoirs, the high voices asking, the low voices answering. The text of verse 7 appears again, and the work is concluded by a fugel setting of the acclamation "Osianna", quoting Mark 11:10.

The motet is frequently included in collections for Advent and Christmas, typically as the title piece.
