= Jimmy Greene =

American jazz saxophonist

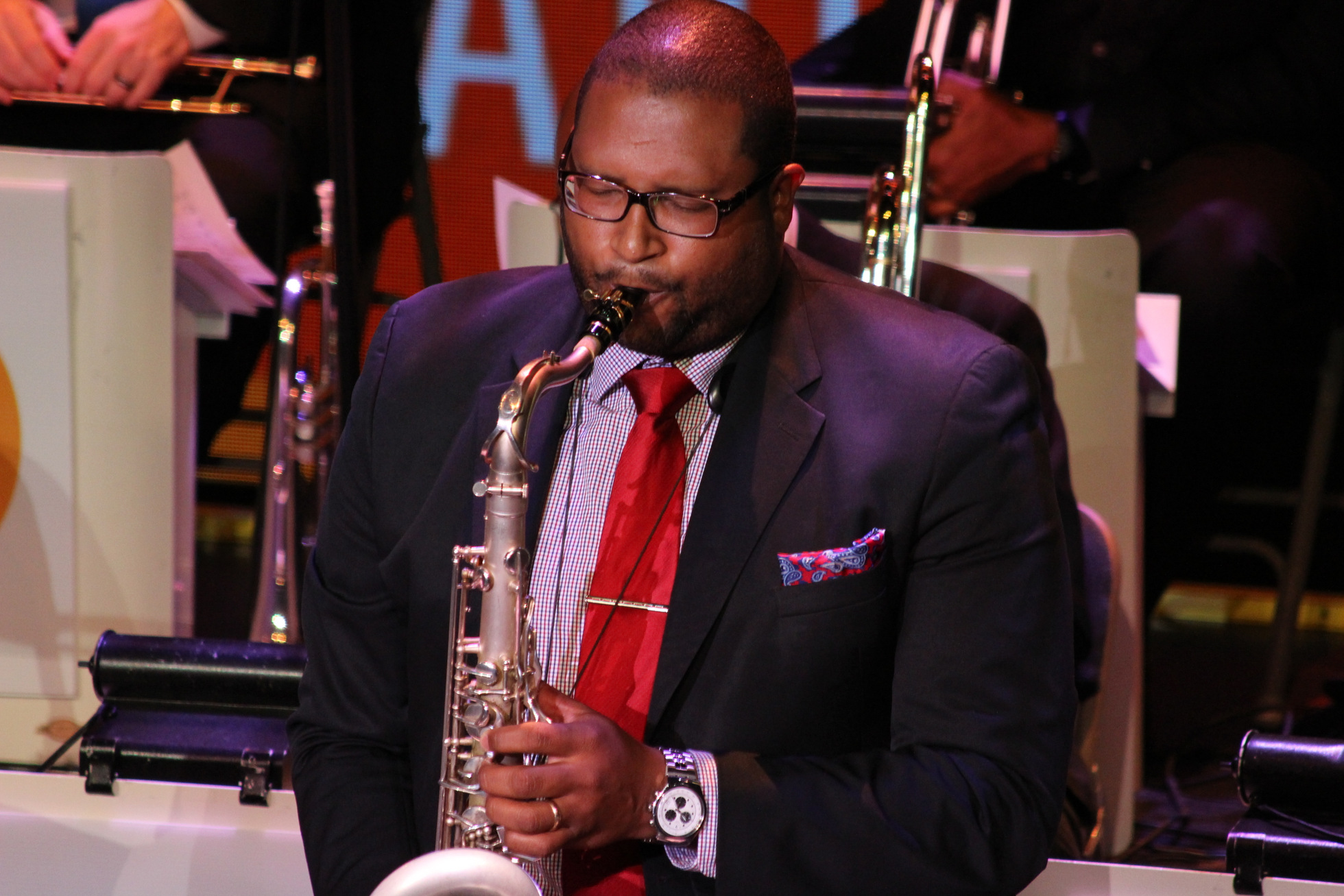
- Greene in 2014

Background information
- Born: James Sidney Greene, Jr. February 24, 1975 (age 51); Hartford, Connecticut
- Origin: Sandy Hook, Connecticut
- Genres: Jazz, gospel, post-bop, neo-bop
- Instrument: Saxophone
- Years active: 1997–present
- Labels: RCA, Criss Cross, Sunnyside, SteepleChase, Mack Avenue
- Website: jimmygreene.com

James Sidney Greene Jr. (born February 24, 1975) is an American jazz saxophonist, gospel musician, recording artist, record producer, and music professor. He started his music career in 1997, and has since released eight studio albums. His eighth studio album, Beautiful Life, was his breakthrough release upon the Billboard magazine charts. It also received his first Grammy Award nominations.

== Early life ==
The son of James Sr., a saxophonist, and Renee Simmons, Greene was born on February 24, 1975, in Hartford, Connecticut. He has three siblings; two sisters, Nayre and Amanda, and a brother, Dorian. The first instrument purchased for him was an alto saxophone, when he was just six years old, where by the age of eight he was getting tutored in how to play the instrument, while by middle school jazz became his obsession. He graduated with honors from Bloomfield High School, in 1993, where he went on to graduate from The Hartt School in 1997, summa cum laude, when he commenced his professional recording career.

== Music career ==
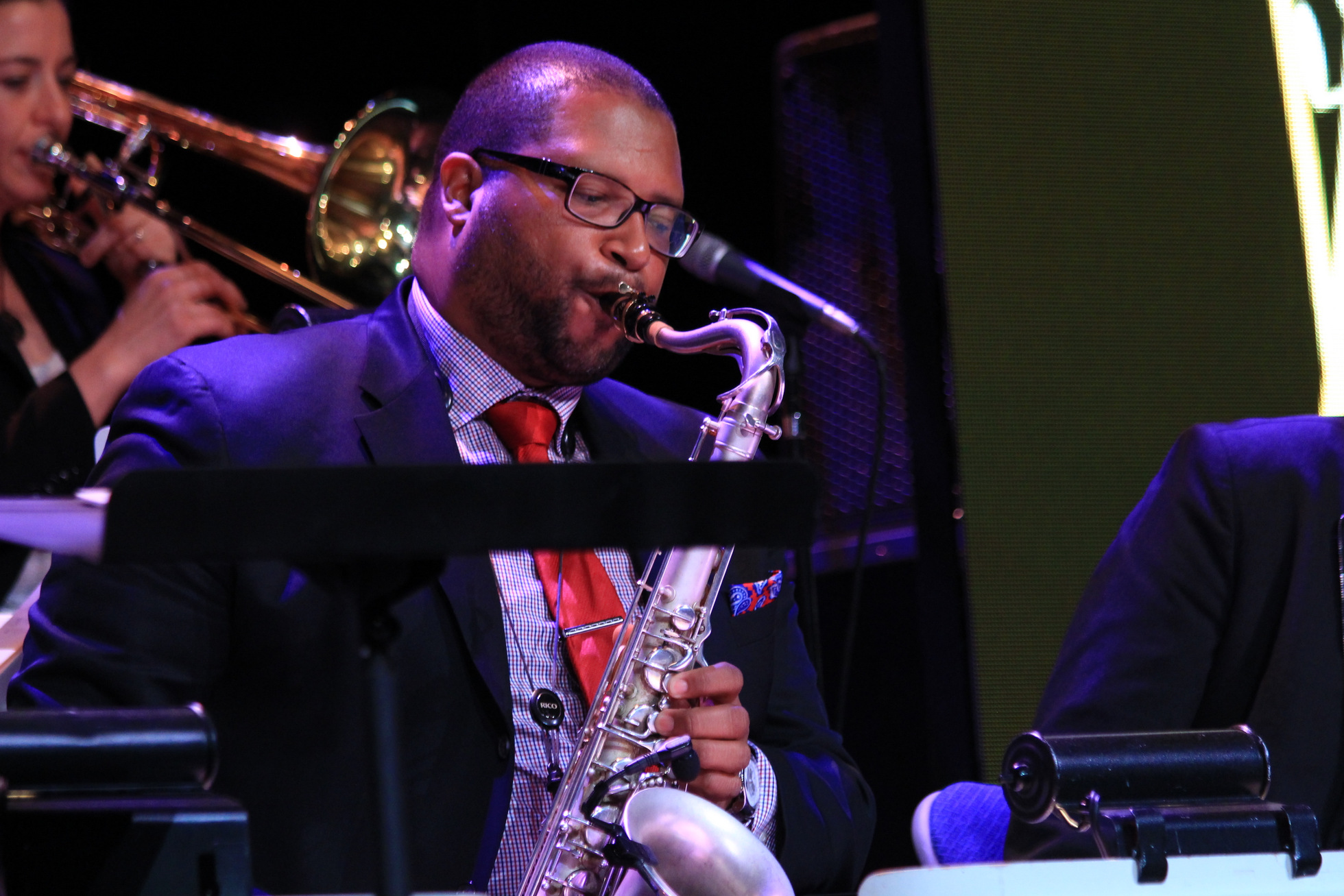
Greene performing in 2014

His music recording career started in 1997. The first studio album, Brand New World, was released by RCA Victor, on January 11, 2000. His second studio album, Introducing Jimmy Greene, was released by Criss Cross Records, on February 8, 2000. The third studio album, Forever, was released on February 17, 2004, by Criss Cross Records. He released, True Life Stories, with Criss Cross Records, on May 16, 2006. His fifth studio album, Gifts and Givers, was released on September 18, 2007, from Criss Cross Records. The sixth studio album, The Overcomer's Suite, was released by Nu Jazz Records, on July 22, 2008. He released, Mission Statement, the seventh studio album, on April 7, 2009, with Sunnyside Records. His eighth studio album, Beautiful Life, was released on November 25, 2014, from Mack Avenue Records. This album was his breakthrough released upon the Billboard magazine charts, where it placed on the Christian Albums, Gospel Albums, Jazz Albums and Heatseekers Albums, while it peaked at No. 36 on the Christian Albums chart, at No. 6 on the Gospel Albums chart, at No. 5 on the Jazz Albums chart, and No. 6 on the Heatseekers Albums chart. This album garnered him a Grammy Award-nomination at the 58th Annual Grammy Awards, for Best Jazz Instrumental Album. Himself alongside performer, Javier Colon, for their performance of the song, " When I Come Home", were nominated for Best Arrangement, Instrumental and Vocals at the 58th Grammy Awards, while Greene is the only arranger credited on the album.

== Personal life ==
Greene is a music professor at Western Connecticut State University, and he resides in nearby Sandy Hook, Connecticut; he also taught at the University of Manitoba for a three-year stretch. He is married to flautist Nelba Márquez. His daughter, Ana Grace Márquez-Greene, was six years old when she was murdered in the Sandy Hook Elementary School shooting, and the album Beautiful Life was made in tribute and dedication to his daughter. He is part of the music ministry at his local church, Glory Chapel International Cathedral.

== Discography ==
List of selected studio albums, with selected chart positions
Title	Album details	Peak chart positions			
Title	Album details	US Chr	US Gos	US Jazz	US Heat
Beautiful Life	Released: November 25, 2014; Label: Mack Avenue; CD, digital download	36	6	5	6
Flowers - Beautiful Life, Vol. 2	Released: April 28, 2017; Label: Mack Avenue; CD, digital download				
While Looking Up	Released: April 3, 2020; Label: Mack Avenue; CD, digital download				

With Mario Pavone

- Ancestors (Playscape, 2008)

With Avishai Cohen

- As Is...Live at the Blue Note

With Ben Riley

- Memories of T (Concord Jazz, 2006)

== Grammy Award nominations ==
58th Annual Grammy Awards (2014–2015)

- Best Arrangement, Instruments And Vocals: "When I Come Home" – Jimmy Greene, arranger (Jimmy Greene with Javier Colon)
- Best Jazz Instrumental Album: Beautiful Life – Jimmy Greene
