= Christoph Bernhard Verspoell =

German priest and hymnwriter (1743–1818)

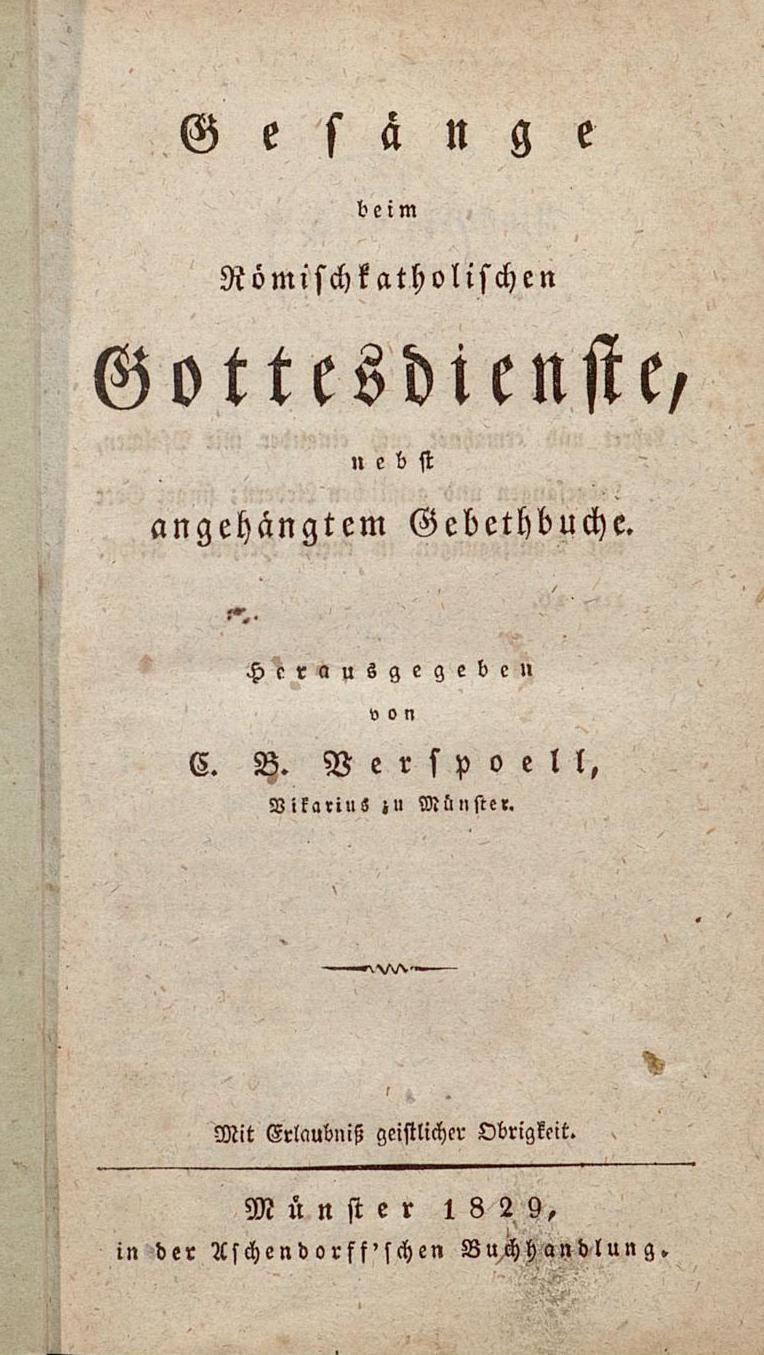
- Cover of Verspoell's hymnal, 1829 edition
- Born: 15 May 1743; Münster, Germany
- Died: 5 January 1818 (aged 74); Münster, Germany
- Occupations: Catholic priest; Hymn writer

Christoph Bernhard Verspoell (15 May 1743 – 5 January 1818) was a German Catholic priest, writer and hymnwriter. He published a hymnal with added melodies and organ settings in 1810. Some of his songs are still popular and are part of the Catholic hymnal Gotteslob.

== Career ==
Verspoell was born in Münster, Germany, on 15 May 1743. He was the son of the baker Joan Bernard Verspoell and his wife Anna Catharina Becker. He was baptised in the Überwasserkirche on 18 May 1743. He grew up with two elder sisters, while two other siblings had died young. His mother died in 1761, and his father remarried the following year.

Verspoell spent his whole life in Münster. He studied theology at the Priesterseminar and became a vicar at St. Lamberti and the Magdalenenhospital in 1776. From 20 January 1779, he was also vicar at St. Crucis of St. Ludgeri, holding these posts until his death. He focused on education and pastoral care (Seelsorge), writing many pastoral instructions, often with the priest of St. Lamberti, such as Fastandacht zum Gekreuzigten (Lenten meditation to the Crucified). All these books were published before 1803, when church life was changed by the Reichsdeputationshauptschluss.

Verspoell seems then to have turned to writing hymns, both texts and melodies with organ accompaniment. In 1810, he published his hymnal Gesänge beim römisch-katholischen Gottesdienste, nebst angehängtem Gebetbuche, also called the Verspoellsches Gesangbuch, containing the texts of hymns and prayers, also Melodien zu den Gesängen beim römisch-katholischen Gottesdienst with the melodies, and Orgelbegleitung zu den Gesängen beim römisch-katholischen Gottesdienste with organ settings.

Several of his hymns are part of the Catholic hymnal Gotteslob (2013), some in regional sections.

Title	Notes	Gotteslob number
"Menschen, die ihr wart verloren"	Christmas, text and melody	GL 245
"Öffnet eure Tore"	Ascension hymn based on Psalm 24	regional
"Wahrer Gott, wir glauben dir"	Communion, text and melody	regional
"Menschen, dient aus frohem Triebe"	Processions, text	
"Fest soll mein Taufbund immer stehn"	Baptism, text	regional

His hymnal also contains "Heiligste Nacht" and "O selige Nacht", but he probably just edited the hymns and is not the author. A German version of "O come, O come, Emmanuel", "O komm, o komm, Emmanuel", is attributed to him, but it is not part of his hymnal. He included the hymn "Fest soll mein Taufbund immer stehen", intended for the Feast of Corpus Christi, but now used shortened for baptisms.

He died in Münster. An obituary in an 1818 newspaper attested him the reputation of a pious Christian, a priest of dignity, and most of all a tireless friend of children ("... den Ruf eines frommen Christen, eines würdigen Geistlichen, vor allem aber den eines unermüdeten Kinderfreundes").
