= Menschen, die ihr wart verloren =

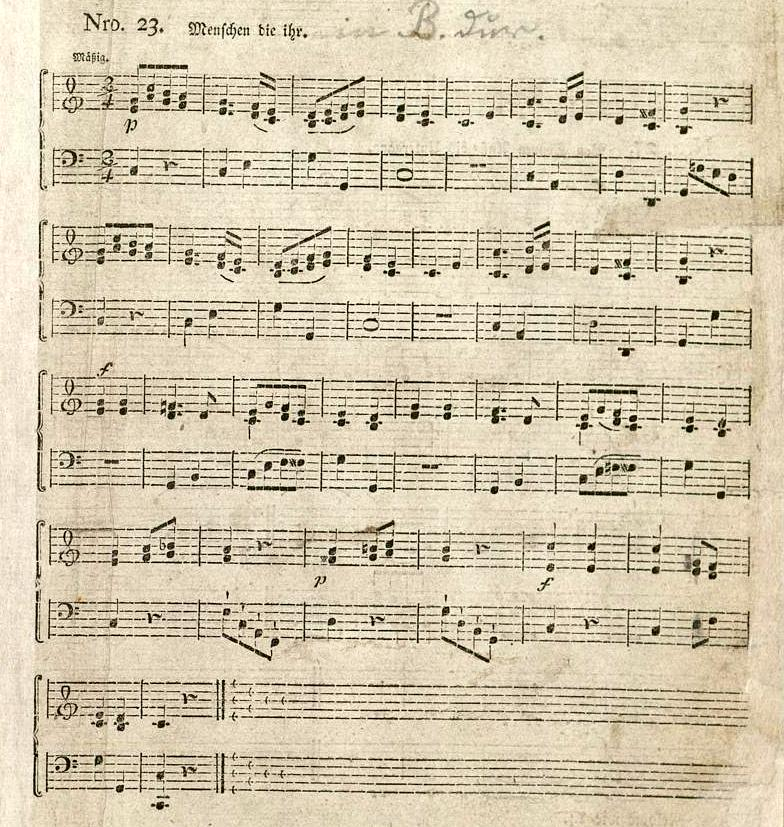
Melody and organ accompaniment, from Orgelbegleitung zu den Gesängen beym Römisch-kathol. Gottesdienste. Herausgegeben von C. B. Verspoell, Münster, 1810

"Menschen, die ihr wart verloren" (German, literally: Humans, you who were lost) is a German Christmas carol. It was originally written by the Catholic priest Christoph Bernhard Verspoell, both the text in ten stanzas and the melody. It became part of several regional versions of the Catholic hymnal Gotteslob in 1975, but was included in the common section (Stammteil) in the current Gotteslob in 2013, as GL 245 in four stanzas, the former stanzas 1, 5, 8 and 9.

The first stanza addresses humans who were lost, telling them to live up and be joyful, because God became equal to men ("den Menschen gleich"). The refrain calls them to give thanks by singing "Glory to God in the highest", alluding to the Annunciation. The second stanza reflects the mystery of the Creator as a helpless child, the third stanza names love as the reason for this act, and the final stanza calls to love him in return.

German

Menschen, die ihr wart verloren,
lebet auf, erfreuet euch!
Heut ist Gottes Sohn geboren,
heut ward er den Menschen gleich.
Lasst uns vor ihm niederfallen,
ihm soll unser Dank erschallen:
"Ehre sei Gott, Ehre sei Gott,
Ehre sei Gott in der Höhe!"

Welche Wunder reich an Segen
stellt uns dies Geheimnis dar!
Seht, der kann sich selbst nicht regen,
durch den alles ist und war.
Lasst uns vor ihm niederfallen …

Selbst der Urquell aller Gaben
leidet solche Dürftigkeit!
Welche Liebe muss der haben,
der sich euch so ganz geweiht!
Lasst uns vor ihm niederfallen …

Menschen! Liebt, o liebt ihn wieder
und vergesst der Liebe nie!
Singt mit Andacht Dankeslieder
und vertraut, er höret sie!
Lasst uns vor ihm niederfallen …

English

O ye men, once in perdition,
recreated rise, rejoice!
Celebrate Christ's apparition:
birth in man-shape was his choice.
Heads and minds incline before him,
singing hymns of praise adore him:
Glory to God, glory to God,
glory to God in the highest!

== Melody ==
Source: Text and melody: Christoph Bernhard Verspoell, Münster 1810.

Heinrich Fidelis Müller composed a different melody when he included Verspoell's text in his Christmas oratorio Weihnachtsoratorium, Op. 5.
