= Fest soll mein Taufbund immer stehn =

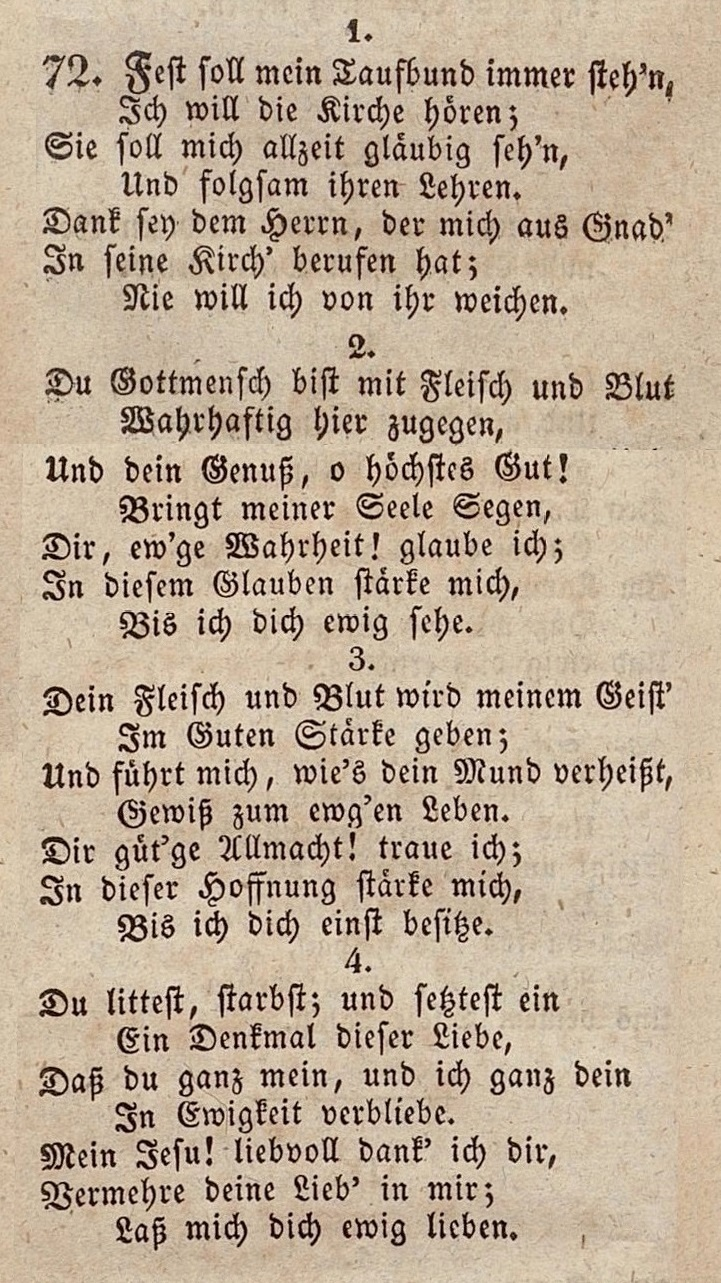
1829 edition

Melody

"Fest soll mein Taufbund immer stehn" (My baptismal bond shall stand firmly) is a Catholic hymn in German, with text by Friedrich Matthias Berghaus. Originally in four stanzas, it was included in Christoph Bernhard Verspoell's hymnal, first in 1810 and again in 1829. The melody was composed by Chrysanth Joseph Bierbaum, published in Bonn in 1826.

== History ==
The text of "Fest soll mein Taufbund immer steh'n" was written, originally in four stanzas, by Friedrich Matthias Berghaus, a Catholic priest in Münster. Christoph Bernhard Verspoell, also a priest there, included it in his hymnal Gesänge beim Römischkatholischen Gottesdienste nebst angehängtem Gebetbuche in 1810, with another edition in 1828. The melody was written later by Chrysanth Joseph Bierbaum (1789–1868), a vicar at St. Remigius in Bonn, where it was published in 1826.

The hymn was first used as a sacramental hymn for the Feast of Corpus Christi. In 1874, it also appeared in the Diocese of Paderborn. Combined with new stanzas, it became a hymn for baptism and confession of creed, and was distributed in all German-speaking regions. The first stanza is still in use in regional sections of the current hymnal Gotteslob, in the Diocese of Münster as GL 847,4, in the Diocese of Paderborn as GL 801,1, in the Diocese of Limburg as GL 862 and in the Diocese of Cologne as GL 834. The Diocese of Regensburg has two stanzas as GL 866, but the origin of the second is unknown.
