= Felice Giardini =

Italian composer

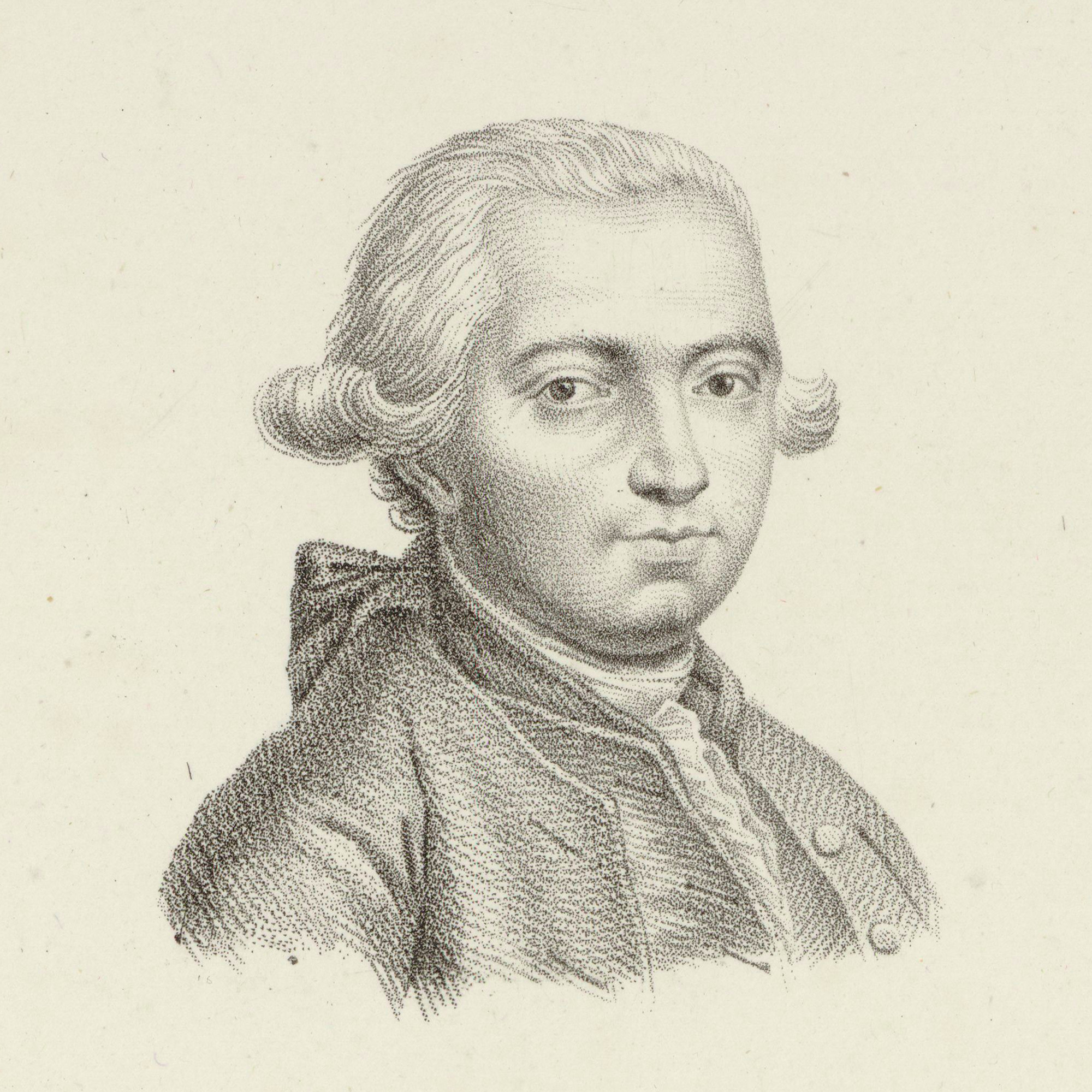
Felice Giardini, 1745 representation, after Giovanni Battista Cipriani.

Felice de Giardini (12 April 1716 – 8 June 1796) was an Italian composer and violinist.

== Early life ==
Felice Giardini was born in Turin. When it became clear that he was a child prodigy, his father sent him to Milan. There he studied singing, harpsichord and violin, but it was on the latter that he became a famous virtuoso. By the age of 12, he was already playing in theatre orchestras. In a famous incident about this time, Giardini, who was serving as assistant concertmaster (i.e., leader of the orchestra) during an opera, played a solo passage for violin which the composer Niccolò Jommelli had written. He decided to show off his skills and improvised several bravura variations that Jommelli had not written. Although the audience applauded loudly, Jommelli, who happened to be there, was not pleased and suddenly stood up and slapped the young man in the face. Giardini, years later, remarked: "It was the most instructive lesson I ever received from a great artist.

== In London ==
During the 1750s, Giardini toured Europe as a violinist, scoring successes in Paris, Berlin, and especially in England, where he eventually settled. For many years, he served as the orchestra leader and director of the Italian Opera in London and gave solo concerts under the auspices of J. C. Bach with whom he was a close friend. He directed the orchestra at the London Pantheon. From the mid-1750s to the end of the 1760s, he was widely regarded as the greatest musical performing artist before the English public. His identity with the "Signor Giardini", who in 1774 sought with Dr Charles Burney to form a public music school associated with the Foundling Hospital, is uncertain. In 1784, he returned to Naples to run a theatre but encountered financial setbacks. In 1793, he returned to England to try his luck. But times had changed, and he was no longer remembered. He then went to Russia, but again had little luck, dying in Moscow in 1796.

== Compositions ==
Giardini was a prolific composer, writing for virtually every genre which then existed. His two main areas, however, were opera and chamber music. Virtually all of his music is out of print with the exception of a few songs and works of chamber music. As a string player, he knew how to make string instruments sound their best. His chamber music combines the so-called Style Galant with the mid-18th-century classicism of J.C. Bach, the Stamitzes and the Mannheim school. In the Style Galant, the writing emphasises the soloistic qualities of the instruments, rather than integrated part-writing, to create a whole. Giardini, although he did write string quartets and quartets for other instruments – a new and evolving form at the time – concentrated on writing trios, primarily those for violin, viola and cello, of which he wrote at least 18.

Giardini is known among Christian churches for his tune "Italian Hymn", "Trinity", or "Moscow", which often accompanies the text to the hymn "Come, Thou Almighty King" and also John Marriott's hymn "Thou whose almighty word". It is the tune for "Glory to God on High", which is in the Latter-day Saint hymnal.

== Family ==
Giardini married Maria Caterina Violante Vistris, a minor Italian singer, in August 1753 in Bramham. Both parties listed their residence at the time as Bramham Park, near Leeds. Bramham was a seat of George Fox-Lane, later created Baron Bingley, whose wife Harriet was Giardini's most consistent patron.
