= Come Thou Almighty King =

Christian hymn

- Genre: Hymn
- Text: Anonymous
- Based on: Psalm 24:10
- Meter: 6.6.4.6.6.6.4
- Melody: "Italian Hymn" by Felice Giardini

"Come Thou Almighty King" is a Christian hymn of unknown authorship, which is attributed to Charles Wesley by Victorian and Edwardian hymnologists, but whose authorship is predominantly stated as "anonymous" in modern hymnals.

== History and authorship ==
The earliest known publication of this hymn is a leaflet that was bound into the 6th edition of George Whitefield's Collection of Hymns for Social Worship, 1757. In this leaflet, the hymn had five verses of seven lines each, and was titled "An Hymn to the Trinity." The leaflet also contained the hymn "Jesus, Let Thy Pitying Eye" by Charles Wesley, and because of this hymnologist Daniel Sedgwick attributed "Come Thou Almighty King" to Wesley as well. However, there is no record of this hymn in any of Wesley's collections of hymns, nor is there any hymn known to be Wesley's that uses the same meter as this hymn does (6,6,4,6,6,6,4).

== Tune ==
The text is metrically adapted to the then new British royal anthem and was initially sung with its tune.

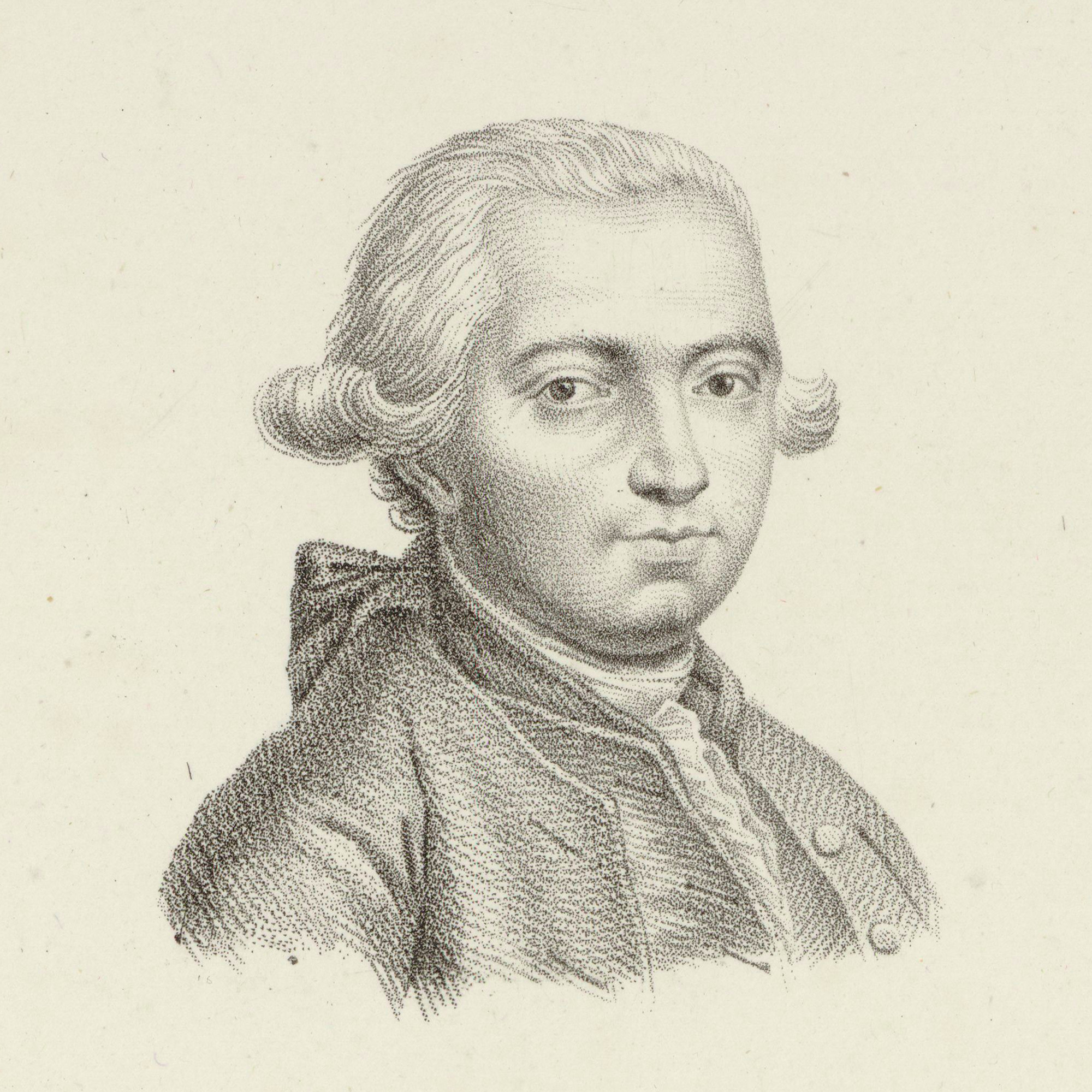
Felice Giardini after Giovanni Battista Cipriani

Presently, "Come Thou Almighty King" is usually sung to the tune "Italian Hymn" (also called "Moscow" or "Trinity"), which was written as a musical setting for this hymn by Felice Giardini at the request of Countess Selina Shirley. This hymn tune along with three others of Giardini's were first published in Martin Madan's Collection of Psalm and Hymn Tunes, 1769.

== Lyrics (1783) ==
Come, thou Almighty King,
Help us thy name to sing,
Help us to praise!
Father all glorious,
O'er all victorious!
Come and reign over us,
Antient of days!

Jesus our Lord, arise,
Scatter our enemies,
And make them fall!
Let thine Almighty aid
Our sure defence be made,
Our souls on thee be stay'd;
Lord hear our call!

Come, thou incarnate word,
Gird on thy mighty sword —
Our pray'r attend!
Come! and thy people bless,
And give thy word success,
Spirit of holiness
On us descend!

Come, holy Comforter,
Thy sacred witness bear,
In this glad hour!
Thou who Almighty art,
Now rule in ev'ry heart,
And ne'er from us depart.
Spirit of pow'r.

To the great one in three
Eternal praises be
Hence — evermore!
His sov'reign Majesty
May we in glory see,
And to eternity
Love and adore!
