= Neo-bop =

Jazz style

Neo-bop jazz
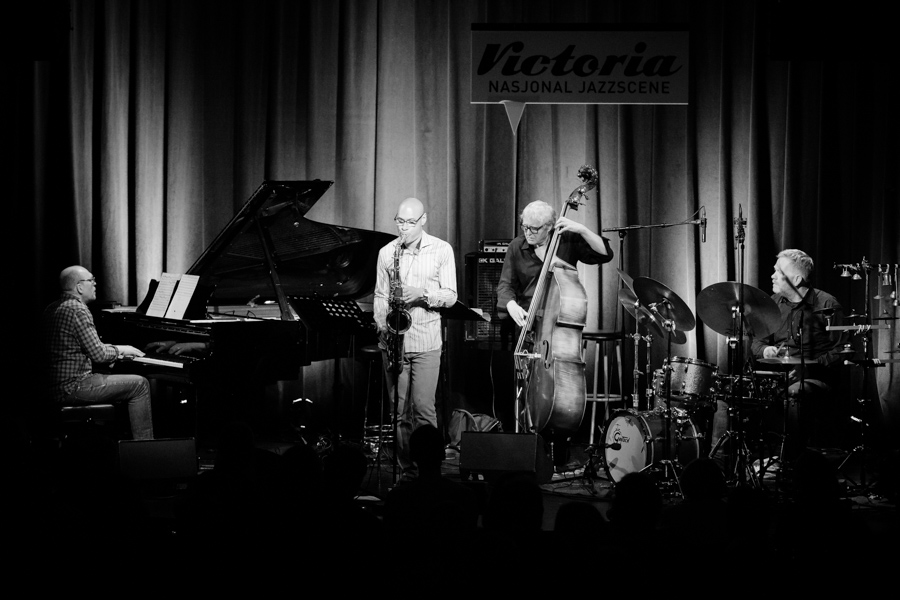
- Joshua Redman Quartet in 2018
- Etymology: From "neo" + "bop"
- Other names: Neotraditionalist jazz
- Stylistic origins: Straight-ahead jazz; bebop; hard bop; modal jazz; post-bop
- Cultural origins: Early 1980s, United States
- Typical instruments: Trumpet; saxophone; piano; double bass; drums
- Derivative forms: Continental jazz

Other topics
- List of neo-bop musicians

Neo-bop (also called neotraditionalist jazz) refers to a style of jazz that gained popularity in the 1980s among musicians who found greater aesthetic affinity for acoustic, swinging, melodic forms of jazz than for the avant-garde jazz and jazz fusion that had gained prominence in the 1960s and 1970s. Neo-bop is distinct from previous bebop and hard bop music due to the influence of trumpeter Wynton Marsalis, who popularized the genre as an artistic and academic endeavor.

== Musical style ==
Neo-bop contains elements of bebop, post-bop, hard bop, and modal jazz. As both "neo-bop" and "post-bop" refer to eclectic mixtures of styles from the bebop and post-bebop eras, the precise differences in musical style between the two are not clearly defined from an academic standpoint.

In the United States, Wynton Marsalis and "The Young Lions" have been associated with both neo-bop and post-bop. Neo-bop was also embraced by established straight-ahead jazz musicians who either abstained from the avant-garde and fusion movements or subsequently returned to music based on more traditional styles.

This return to more traditional styles earned both praise and criticism, with Miles Davis derisively calling it "warmed over turkey" and others deeming it too dependent on the past. The movement, however, received praise from Time magazine and others who welcomed the return of more accessible forms of jazz.

== History ==
=== 1970s: Origins ===
Some bebop and post-bop musicians were lukewarm to the avant-garde jazz explorations of the 1960s and rejected the electric instrumentation and pop and rock influences of jazz fusion. Most prominent among these was drummer Art Blakey, whose Jazz Messengers had long been a stylistic incubator for like-minded younger musicians. Drummer Cindy Blackman credited Blakey with keeping traditional jazz from being completely eclipsed by fusion during the 1970s. Many of the younger musicians who went on to form the core of the neotraditionalist "Young Lions", including Marsalis, were Jazz Messengers alumni.

Albert Murray, in his 1976 book Stomping the Blues, contended that true jazz was based on three elements: swing, blues tonalities, and acoustic sounds. His ideas influenced critic Stanley Crouch, who, along with Marsalis, became a militant advocate of this typology. Crouch contended that many of the stylistic devices of avant-garde jazz and fusion were used as a cover for lazy-mindedness or lack of musicianship: "We should laugh at those who make artistic claims for fusion." In 1987, Murray, Crouch, and Marsalis founded the Jazz at Lincoln Center organization at Lincoln Center in New York, where Crouch and Marsalis would serve as artistic directors; it would become one of the main institutional promoters of the neotraditionalist movement.

=== 1980s: Young Lions ===
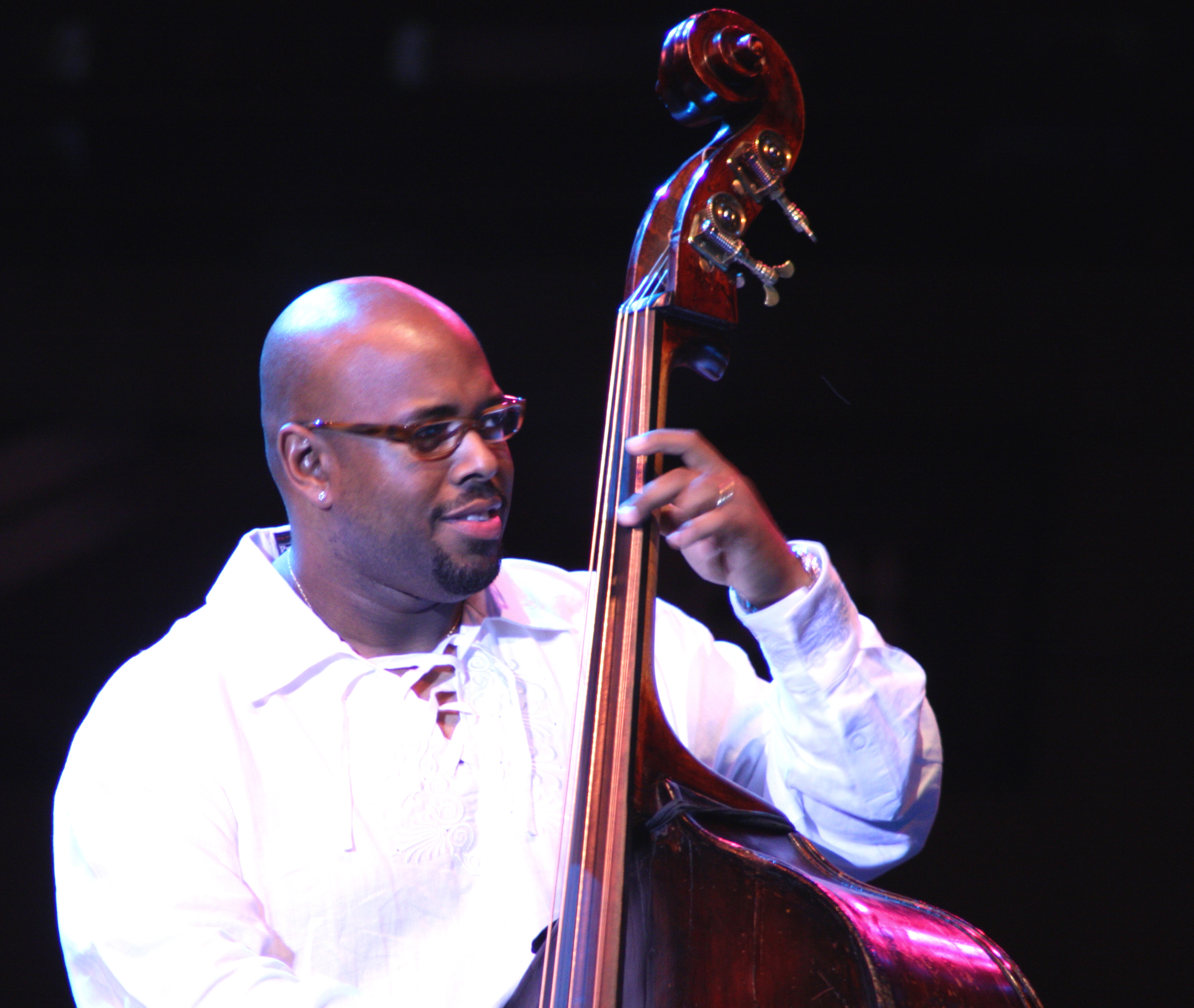
Bassist Christian McBride in 2009

Wynton Marsalis, son of jazz pianist Ellis Marsalis, emerged on the jazz scene in the early 1980s and looked to late swing music and bebop for his main influences, from trumpeter Fats Navarro to Kenny Dorham. His 1982 album Wynton Marsalis was, according to the Los Angeles Times, "the birth point of the Re-bop Renaissance." A crucial difference, however, between the neo-bop movement and its predecessors was that neo-bop had academic roots and rejected the "iconoclastic" and rebellious countercultural lifestyles of the bop era; Marsalis instead advocated that jazz could achieve "fine-art" status and be compared to classical music rather than rock music.

While his predecessors of the previous two decades had experienced financial success in fusion genres, Marsalis' commitment to a traditional definition of "jazz" caught on with a school of musicians including Terence Blanchard, Donald Harrison, Wallace Roney, Kevin Eubanks, Stanley Jordan, Kenny Kirkland, and Jeff Watts. Marsalis later founded Jazz at Lincoln Center to promote jazz concerts, with further "Young Lions" becoming prominent jazz musicians, including Christian McBride, Marcus Roberts, and Roy Hargrove.

=== 1990s: Distinct subgenre ===
With the revival of hard bop as mainstream jazz in the 1990s, neo-bop jazz began to form its own reputation as a distinct subgenre of jazz. According to critic Scott Yanow, this new subgenre remained related to the broader straight-ahead category, but was no longer "recycling the past" as some claimed. Alternatively, neo-bop has been criticized for lacking the innovation of the pioneering beboppers of the 1940s and 1950s and for being too commercial.
