= 2025 in jazz =

- Decade: 2020s in jazz
- Music: 2025 in music
- Standards: List of jazz standards
- See also: 2024 in jazz – 2026 in jazz

This is a timeline documenting events of jazz in the year 2025.

== Events ==
- January 29 – February 1 – The Bodø Jazz Open takes place in Norway, featuring Solveig Slettahjell, Arve Henriksen. Rebekka Bakken and others.

== Albums ==
Month	Day	Artist	Album	Label	Subgenres	Notes	Ref.
January	10	Xhosa Cole	On a Modern Genius Vol 1	Stoney Lane Records			
January	17	Mac Miller	Balloonerism	Warner			
January	31	Ambrose Akinmusire	Honey from a Winter Stone	Nonesuch	avant-garde jazz		
January	31	Damon Locks	List of Demands	International Anthem			
February	28	Yazz Ahmed	A Paradise in the Hold	Night Time Stories	Arabic influenced Spiritual jazz		
March	14	Nels Cline	Consentrik Quartet				
March	28	Sasha Berliner	Fantôme				
March	28	Maya Delilah	The Long Way Round	Blue Note, Capitol			
April	4	Hiromi Uehara	OUT THERE	Concord Records			
May	30	Brad Turner	It's All So	Cellar Music			
June	13	Mary Halvorson	About Ghosts	Nonesuch Records			
June	14	Daniel Carter	Stream of a Dream	577 Records		Featuring Matthew Putman and Federico Ughi	
June	20	Joshua Redman	Words Fall Short	Blue Note Records			
August	22	Caity Gyorgy and Mark Limacher	Caity Gyorgy with Strings: Arranged and Conducted by Mark Limacher				
August	29	Brad Mehldau	Ride into the Sun	Nonesuch Records		Featuring the music of Elliott Smith. Features Daniel Rossen and Chris Thile.	
September	19	Cécile McLorin Salvant	Oh Snap	Nonesuch Records			
October	3	Bill Coon	Standard Elegance	Cellar Music			

== Awards ==
=== Grammy Awards ===
The 67th Annual Grammy Awards were held on February 2, 2025 honoring the best recordings, compositions, and artists from September 16, 2023, to August 30, 2024, as chosen by the members of the Recording Academy.

Jazz
Best Jazz Performance: "Twinkle Twinkle Little Me" – Samara Joy featuring Sullivan Fortner; "Walk with Me, Lord (SOUND | SPIRIT)" – The Baylor Project; "Phoenix Reimagined (Live)" – Lakecia Benjamin featuring Randy Brecker, Jeff "Tain" Watts & John Scofield; "Juno" – Chick Corea & Béla Fleck; "Little Fears" – Dan Pugach Big Band featuring Nicole Zuraitis & Troy Roberts	Best Jazz Vocal Album: A Joyful Holiday – Samara Joy; Journey in Black – Christie Dashiell; Wildflowers Vol. 1 – Kurt Elling & Sullivan Fortner; Milton + Esperanza – Milton Nascimento & Esperanza Spalding; My Ideal – Catherine Russell & Sean Mason
Best Jazz Instrumental Album: Remembrance – Chick Corea & Béla Fleck; Owl Song – Ambrose Akinmusire featuring Bill Frisell & Herlin Riley; Beyond This Place – Kenny Barron feat. Kiyoshi Kitagawa, Johnathan Blake, Immanuel Wilkins & Steve Nelson; Phoenix Reimagined (Live) – Lakecia Benjamin; Solo Game – Sullivan Fortner	Best Large Jazz Ensemble Album: Bianca Reimagined: Music for Paws and Persistence – Dan Pugach Big Band; Returning to Forever – John Beasley & Frankfurt Radio Big Band; And So It Goes – The Clayton-Hamilton Jazz Orchestra; Walk a Mile in My Shoe – Orrin Evans & The Captain Black Big Band; Golden City – Miguel Zenón
Best Latin Jazz Album: Cubop Lives! – Luques Curtis, Zaccai Curtis, Willie Martinez, Camilo Molina & Reinaldo de Jesus; Spain Forever Again – Michel Camilo & Tomatito; COLLAB – Hamilton de Holanda & Gonzalo Rubalcaba; Time and Again – Eliane Elias; El Trio: Live in Italy – Horacio "El Negro" Hernández, John Beasley & José Gola; Cuba and Beyond – Chucho Valdés & Royal Quartet; As I Travel – Donald Vega featuring Lewis Nash, John Patitucci & Luisito Quintero	Best Alternative Jazz Album: No More Water: The Gospel of James Baldwin – Meshell Ndegeocello; Night Reign – Arooj Aftab; New Blue Sun – André 3000; Code Derivation – Robert Glasper; Foreverland – Keyon Harrold

== All critically reviewed albums ranked ==
Metacritic

Number	Artist	Album	Average score	Number of reviews	Reference
1	Jimi Tenor Band	Silver In Seattle: Live At The Penthouse	90	5	
2	Yazz Ahmed	A Paradise In The Hold	89	4	
3	Ambrose Akinmusire	Honey From a Winter Stone	88	4	
4	Charles Lloyd	Figure In Blue	87	4	
5	Donny McCaslin	Lullaby For The Lost	86	5	
6	Brad Mehldau	Ride into the Sun	86	4	
7	Emma-Jean Thackray	Weirdo	85	9	
8	Marshall Allen	New Dawn	85	6	
9	Damon Locks	List of Demands	85	5	
10	Mulatu Astatke	Mulatu Plays Mulatu	85	4	
11	Mary Halvorson	About Ghosts	84	7	
12	James Brandon Lewis	Apple Cores	84	6	
13	JJJJJerome Ellis	Vesper Sparrow	84	6	
14	SML	How You Been	84	6	
14	Branford Marsalis Quartet	Belonging	84	4	
15	Rafael Toral	Traveling Light	84	4	
16	[Ahmed]	[Sama'a] (Audition)	84	4	
17	Makaya McCraven	Off The Record	83	7	
18	Ben LaMar Gay	Yowzers	83	5	
19	Nels Cline	Consentrik Quartet	82	7	
20	Alabaster DePlume	A Blade Because a Blade Is Whole	81	10	
21	The Necks	Disquiet	81	5	
22	Chicago Underground Duo	Hyperglyph	81	5	
23	Xhosa Cole	On A Modern Genius, Vol.1	81	5	
24	Jimi Tenor Band	Selenites, Selenites!	81	4	
25	Tom Skinner	Kaleidoscopic Visions	80	4	
26	GoGo Penguin	Necessary Fictions	79	4	
27	Pino Palladino and Blake Mills	That Wasn't A Dream	79	4	
28	Kokoroko	Tuff Times Never Last	79	7	
29	Brandee Younger	Gadabout Season	77	4	
30	Cécile McLorin Salvant	Oh Snap	71	4	

== Radio Airplay Charts ==
Radio airplay statistics from 2025 collected by JazzWeek

Number	Artist	Album	Peak	Weeks on the Charts	Number of Spins
1	Cyrus Chestnut	Rhythm, Melody and Harmony	1	26	4383
2	Artemis	Arboresque	1	26	4011
3	Jeremy Pelt	Woven	1	26	3992
4	Renee Rosnes	Crossing Paths	1	26	3973
5	Tyreek McDole	Open Up Your Senses	1	24	3955
6	Dave Stryker	Stryker With Strings Goes To The Movies	2	26	3817

== Deaths ==
- January 12 – Mark Izu, American double bass player and composer, 70
- January 14 – Teddy Osei, Ghanaian saxophone player, drummer and vocalist, leader of Osibisa, 87
- March 4 – Roy Ayers, American jazz-funk vibraphonist, record producer, and composer, 84
- March 8 – Bill Ashton, British saxophonist, band leader and composer, 88
- March 14 – Bruno Romani, Italian saxophonist, flutist and composer, 65
- April 1 – George Freeman, American guitarist, 97
- April 22 – Odd Magne Gridseth, Norwegian bassist, 65
- April 26
  - Andy Bey, American singer and pianist, 85
  - Rigmor Newman, Swedish-born jazz concert producer and talent manager resident in the USA, 86
- May 12 – Yasunao Tone, Japanese jazz composer, 90
- May 23 – Lillian Boutté, American jazz singer, 75
- May 25 – Joe Ford, American jazz saxophonist, 78
- May 28 – Al Foster, American jazz drummer, 82
- June 13 – Louis Moholo, South African jazz drummer (The Blue Notes, Brotherhood of Breath, Assagai), 85
- June 17 – Charles Burrell, American bassist, 104
- July 22 – Chuck Mangione, American flugelhornist, trumpeter and composer, 84
- July 24 – Cleo Laine, English jazz singer, 97
- August 5 – Nancy King, American jazz singer, 85
- August 6 – Eddie Palmieri, American jazz pianist, composer and bandleader, 88
- August 11 – Sheila Jordan, American jazz singer, 96
- September 13 – Akiko Tsuruga, Japanese jazz organist, 58
- September 26 – Jim McNeely, American jazz pianist and composer, 76
- October 19 – Anthony Jackson, American electric bass player, 73
- October 26 – Jack DeJohnette, American jazz drummer, pianist, and composer, 83

== See also ==
- List of 2025 albums
- List of jazz festivals
- List of years in jazz
- 2025 in music
