= Trenchmouth vs. The Light of the Sun =

Studio album by Trenchmouth
- Released: January 17, 1995
- Recorded: July 1994
- Studio: Idful, Chicago, Illinois
- Genre: Post-punk; noise rock
- Length: 33:32
- Label: EastWest Records
- Producer: Brad Wood

Trenchmouth chronology
Inside the Future (1993)	Trenchmouth vs. The Light of the Sun (1995)	The Broadcasting System (1996)

Trenchmouth vs. The Light of the Sun is the third studio album by American rock band Trenchmouth, released in January 1995 by EastWest Records, becoming the band's only album on a major label. Disillusioned with how they felt they did not have a place in the scene and time period they shared with bands such as Fugazi, Nation of Ulysses and Jawbox, Trenchmouth decided to change directions and recorded the album with producer and mixer Brad Wood in July 1994. The aggressive and eclectic album combines influences and styles of noise rock, post-punk, no wave, dub, ska and jazz.

The album incorporates walking basslines, mutating time signatures, polyrhythms, guitar feedback, dissonance and elaborate guitar phasing. Vocalist Damon Locks uses a unique speak-singing style, while drummer Fred Armisen's percussive style uses change-ups and conspicuous use of drum rolls. More melodic in the album are guitarist Chris de Zutter and bassist Wayne Montana. Upon release, the album was commercially unsuccessful, despite reaching number 39 on the Top 75 Alternative Radio Play chart, but it did receive favourable reviews from music critics. The album has been posed as a "meaner" and "less tuneful" precedent to several post-punk revival bands in the mid-2000s.

== Background and recording ==
Trenchmouth formed in Chicago in 1988. Described by Andy Kellman of AllMusic as "[a] completely uncategorizable quartet," the band incorporated a variety of diverse genres into their music, fusing Caribbean rhythms with the energy of hardcore punk, the "ass-grabbing power" of funk and numerous jazz characteristics. Though their debut album Construction of New Action (1991) established the group's unique musical style, with hints of funk, Latin music and metal, it was not until their second album Inside the Future (1993) that the band's musical style became more aggressive, hinting towards the eventual direction taken on Trenchmouth vs. The Light of the Sun.

Vocalist Damon Locks felt the band "were never in vogue," saying that other bands which Trenchmouth were friends with and played with, such as Fugazi, Nation of Ulysses and Jawbox, "seemed to have a place in that time period. [...] They had a place in that scene, and we didn't." It was with Trenchmouth vs. The Light of the Sun that the band figured they could not "win," so instead decided to, as Locks called it, "do our own thing." The sound that Damon Locks and bassist Wayne Montana styled in their subsequent band The Eternals was first experimented with during this period. Trenchmouth vs. The Light of the Sun was recorded at Idful Studios in July 1994 with recording and mixing by Brad Wood. A radio excerpt in the song "A Man Without Lungs" was taken from Lights Out, incorporated with permission from Radio Yesteryear.

== Musical style ==
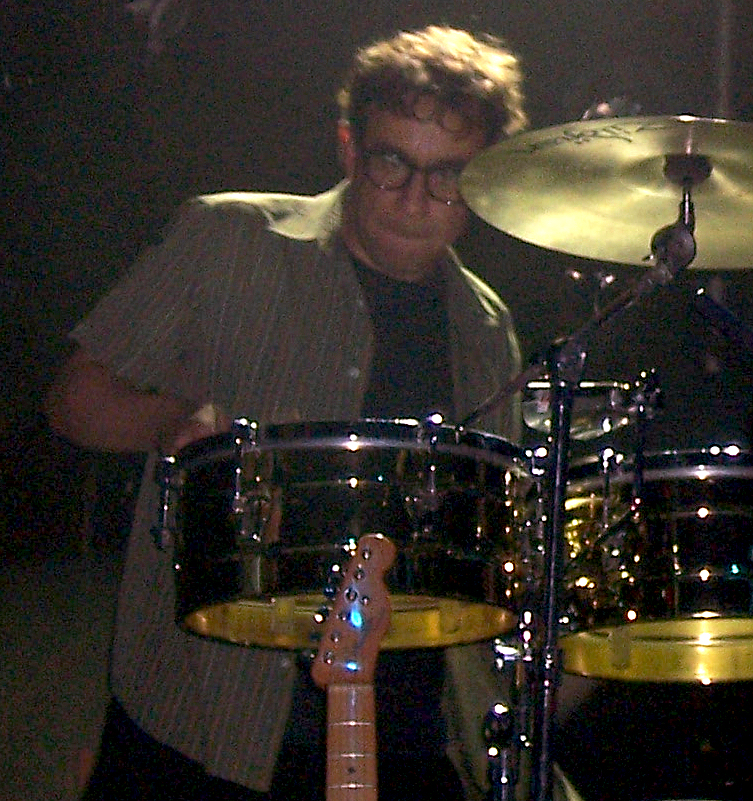
Fred Armisen (pictured in 2008) makes conspicuous usage of tom-toms, drum rolls and percussion change-ups on the album.

Trenchmouth vs. The Light of the Sun takes the noise rock sound like that of the Touch & Go and Amphetamine Reptile labels and applies it to a post-punk style reminiscent of first-wave post-punk groups Gang of Four, Cabaret Voltaire, the Pop Group and A Certain Ratio. Influences on the album include punk rock, no wave, dub and ska, and it incorporates walking basslines, extravagant guitar phasing and evolving time signatures. Chauncey Hollingsworth of Chicago Tribune felt the album "taps a murky vein somewhere between tribal punk-jazz and an aborted art project," while Devon Jackson of Entertainment Weekly felt the album "teeters on the edge" of controlled chaos and sophisticated polyrhythmic dissonance. Unlike the other songs, opening song "Washington, Washington" features a consistent 4/4 beat throughout its two minute duration. "How I Became Invincible" features jagged rhythms, and a frenzied bassline, as does "How I Became Invincible." "A Man Without Lungs" has been described as "new Trench-dub." "Doing the Flammability" has been described as an insistent tumult.

Vocalist Damon Locks relies upon lyrical repetition "as an instrument of sorts," and uses rhyming "word-jazz" over the music's free-form "anti-harmonies." His unusual vocals incorporate a speak-singing style, described by one writer as neither singing nor shouting but a spoken, maddening voice. His vocals have been compared to Jello Biafra, David Thomas, Matt Lukin and N.W.A.-era Ice Cube. Joshua Glazer of AllMusic describes the lyrics as teeming "with occupational imagery that mirrors the goose-stepping rhythms and espionage riffs. Vocalist Damon Locks schizophrenically switches from oppressor to resistance by speak-singing in the disturbed cadence of a mad dictator or shell-shocked survivor. Calling out the warning 'they got lights for eyes and submachine guns/they're rolling over houses like they were made of marzipan,' Locks confirms that Trenchmouth Vs. the Light of the Sun is an armed conflict."

Fred Armisen's drumming is jagged and powerful, and incorporates percussion change-ups. He rarely plays a simple rock beat and instead makes prominent usage of tom-toms and drum rolls, though his drumming stops short from being technical. Damon Locks also provides some of his own percussion, helping to contribute towards the album's unusual percussive sound. The melodies on the album are provided by the guitar and bass. Guitarist Chris de Zutter's guitar work ranges from bombastic post-hardcore to jazz-inspired inflection. Using either simplistic chords or riffs, he plays with a stark, angular tone, and uses guitar feedback at his most chaotic. Wayne Montana's bass provides a "bizarre undercurrent" with his rapid, walking basslines, contributing towards the absence of any solid bottom in the music.

== Release ==
Released on January 17, 1995, Trenchmouth vs. The Light of the Sun was the band's only album on major label EastWest Records. In 2013, Spin included the album at number 30 in their list of "The 40 Weirdest Post-‘Nevermind’ Major-Label Albums." They felt that "[a]side from Fugazi's toe-dips into similar territory (and what little Gang of Four you could hear in the Red Hot Chili Peppers), the mainstream precedent for [the band's musical style] was a small, specialist group of mid-'90s record collectors. So, just think of Trenchmouth's lone major-label album as an early, meaner, less tuneful version of what Bloc Party, Futureheads, and Franz Ferdinand would flourish with ten years later." The album's liner notes list Candy Machine's A Modest Proposal (1994) as a "must have" album. Though the album was not a commercial success, it reached number 39 on the CMJ New Music Monthly Top 75 Alternative Radio Play chart.

== Critical reception and legacy ==
Professional ratings
Review scores
Source	Rating
AllMusic	4.5/5 stars
Chicago Tribune	2/4 stars
Entertainment Weekly	A−
Sputnikmusic	3.5/5 stars
Trouser Press	(favourable)
The Washington Post	(favourable)

Trenchmouth vs. The Light of the Sun received positive reviews from critics. Devon Jackson of Entertainment Weekly rated the album A− and wrote that: "At once hypnotic and herky-jerky, the harsh vocals and harsher guitars complement a percussive collision reminiscent of the Clash. More for intellectual moshers than for the musically squeamish." Mark Jenkins of The Washington Post reviewed the album alongside Candy Machine's A Modest Proposal. He said both bands "play brittle art-funk that draws on the tradition of Captain Beefheart, Pere Ubu, the Pop Group, the Fall and other left-field types." He said Trenchmouth vs. The Light of the Sun resembles A Modest Proposal, "without quite so many low-key, recitative interludes. Despite a similar sound, the Chicago quartet provides a few more distinctive details."

Mark Woodlief of Trouser Press said that the album "steers Trenchmouth further towards infinity." He felt that "DeZutter turns in his finest work here, from post-hardcore bombast to jazz-inspired inflection, and the band's earnest, precise approach is richer and more intriguing than before." Chauncey Hollingsworth of the Chicago Tribune was more reserved, and while comparing the album to "an alternately plodding and frenetic soundtrack to some Image Union film short," also concluded that the album was "[h]ard to appreciate as art; harder as music." Tyler Fisher of Sputnikmusic said the album is "a difficult release. The sound is bizarre, chaotic, and jarring. Myself, I hated it on the first few listens. However, going into the album expecting to chaos, I was able to appreciate the rhythmic intricacy and complexity of the songs at their best. Still, a lack of variety and poor production plague the album."

AllMusic's Joshua Glazer rated the album four and a half stars out of five and named it an "Album Pick". He felt the album captures the aggressive musical palette of the band which consistently "teeters on the edge of chaos while maintaining a ridged form." He commented that: "Mutating time signatures, elaborate guitar phrasing, and fast-walking basslines may traditionally signify 1970s prog-rock obesity, but the Chicago quartet Trenchmouth takes these elements to a field far more left of center." Andrew Earles of Spin retrospectively felt the album was a more angular precedent to several post-punk revival bands active in the mid-2000s.

== Track listing ==
All songs written by Chris De Zutter, Damon Locks, Fred Armisen and Wayne Montana.

No.	Title	Length
1.	"Washington! Washington!"	2:23
2.	"A Prescription Written in a Different Language"	3:33
3.	"Here Come The Automata"	2:41
4.	"How I Became Invincible"	4:29
5.	"Set the Oven at 400°"	3:26
6.	"Saw a Ghost"	1:52
7.	"The Effects of Radiation"	3:20
8.	"Doing the Flammability"	3:08
9.	"A Man Without Lungs"	6:02
10.	"Bricks Should Have Wings"	2:41

== Personnel ==
- Damon Locks – vocals, artwork, concept, percussion, writing
- Wayne Montana – bass, writing
- Fred Armisen – drums, writing
- Chris De Zutter – guitar, writing
- Designstein – layout, design
- Rob Coleman – layout, design
- Michael "The Don" Hay – photography
- Brad Wood – recording, mixing
- Julie Goodwin – guest vocals
