= 11:11 (numerology) =

Superstition about numbers

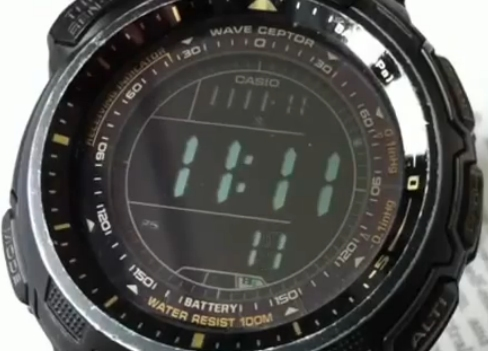
A watch indicating 11:11:11 on November 11th, 2011 (11/11/11)

In numerology, 11:11 is considered to be a significant moment in time for an event to occur. It is seen as an example of synchronicity, as well as a favorable sign or a suggestion towards the presence of spiritual influence. It is additionally thought that the repetition of numbers in the sequence adds "intensity" to them and increases the numerological effect.

Critics highlight the lack of substantial evidence for this assertion, and they gesture towards confirmation bias and post-hoc analysis as a scientific explanation for any claims related to the significance or importance of 11:11 and other such sequences. Through observations made in the study of statistics, specifically chaos theory and the law of truly large numbers, skeptics explain these anecdotal observations as a coincidence and an inevitability, rather than as any particular indication towards significance.

== Significance in Christianity ==
While the number 11 or 11:11 has no inherent significance within Protestant Christianity, some people have attempted to apply this belief to the Bible by citing chapters and verses such as Genesis 11:11, Proverbs 11:11, Matthew 11:11, Mark 11:11, and so on.

== Significance in dates ==
For various reasons, individuals are known to attribute significance to dates and numbers. One notable example is the significance given to "the eleventh hour of the eleventh day of the eleventh month," which corresponds to 11:00 a.m. (Paris time) on 11 November 1918. It marks the moment when the armistice ending World War I took effect.

On 11 November 2011, also known as "11/11/11", there was an increase in the number of marriages occurring in various regions worldwide, including the United States and across the Asian continent.

In modern spiritual and New Age communities, 11:11 is often seen as a powerful symbol of synchronicity, awakening, and alignment with the universe. Some individuals interpret frequent sightings of 11:11 as a sign that they are on the right spiritual path or that a spiritual awakening is imminent.

In Poland, the date of 11/11 (11 November) and the 11:11 hour are considered symbolic of November 11, 1918, the Polish Independence Day, on which Poland was liberated from German, Austrian and Russian occupation.

In the United States, 11/11 is referred to as Corduroy Day, due to the number’s resemblance to the vertical lines of the fabric.

== In popular culture ==
In literature, Barbara O’Connor’s novel Wish (2016) features a main character who regularly looks for 11:11 on the clock as an opportunity to make wishes, reflecting the belief that the time carries special significance.

Additionally, pop star Conan Gray's album Wishbone (2025) featured a song titled "Eleven Eleven", where he says he'll always wish for fictional lost lover, Brando. The album also contains a few other lyrical references to the numbers.

== See also ==
- Law of Fives
- 23 enigma
- Apophenia
