= List of UK Jazz & Blues Albums Chart number ones of 2021 =

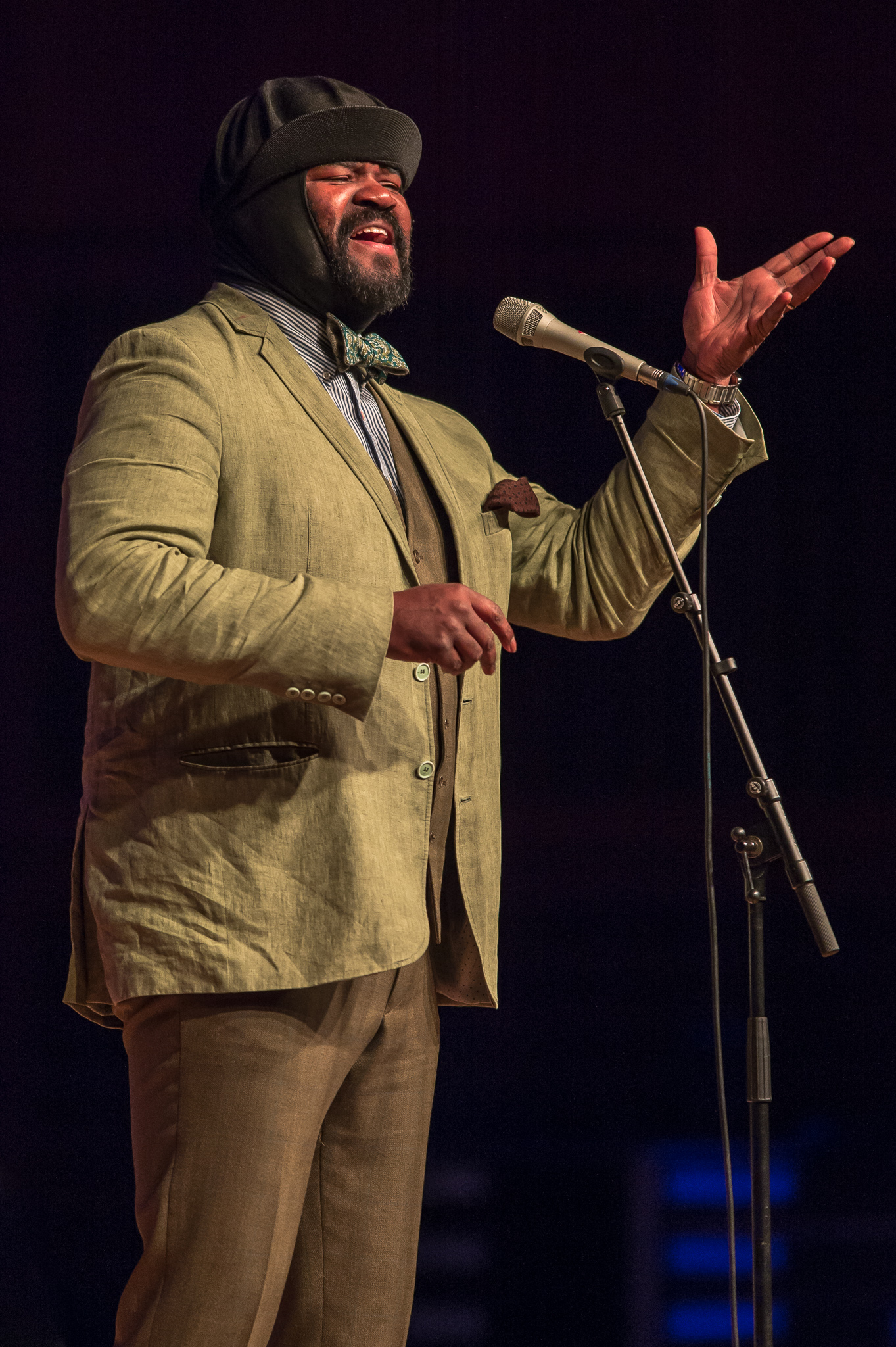
Gregory Porter spent the last eight weeks of 2021 atop the UK Jazz & Blues Albums Chart with the greatest hits album Still Rising: The Collection.

The UK Jazz & Blues Albums Chart is a record chart which ranks the best-selling jazz and blues albums in the United Kingdom. Compiled and published by the Official Charts Company, the data is based on each album's weekly physical sales, digital downloads and streams. In 2021, 53 charts were published with 30 albums at number one. The first number-one album of the year was The Best of Peter Green's Fleetwood Mac by Fleetwood Mac, which spent the first two weeks of the year atop the chart. The last number-one album of the year was Still Rising: The Collection, the first greatest hits album by Gregory Porter, for the last eight weeks of 2021.

The most successful album on the UK Jazz & Blues Albums Chart in 2021 was Porter's Still Rising: The Collection, which spent eight straight weeks atop the chart. The second most successful albums were The Ultimate Collection, a greatest hits album by Ella Fitzgerald, and Delta Kream, the tenth studio album by The Black Keys, both of which spent five weeks at number one over multiple spells. Emma-Jean Thackray spent four weeks atop the UK Jazz & Blues Albums Chart with her first full-length studio album Yellow, while Tony Bennett and Lady Gaga spent three weeks at number one with their second collaborative release, Love for Sale.

== Chart history ==
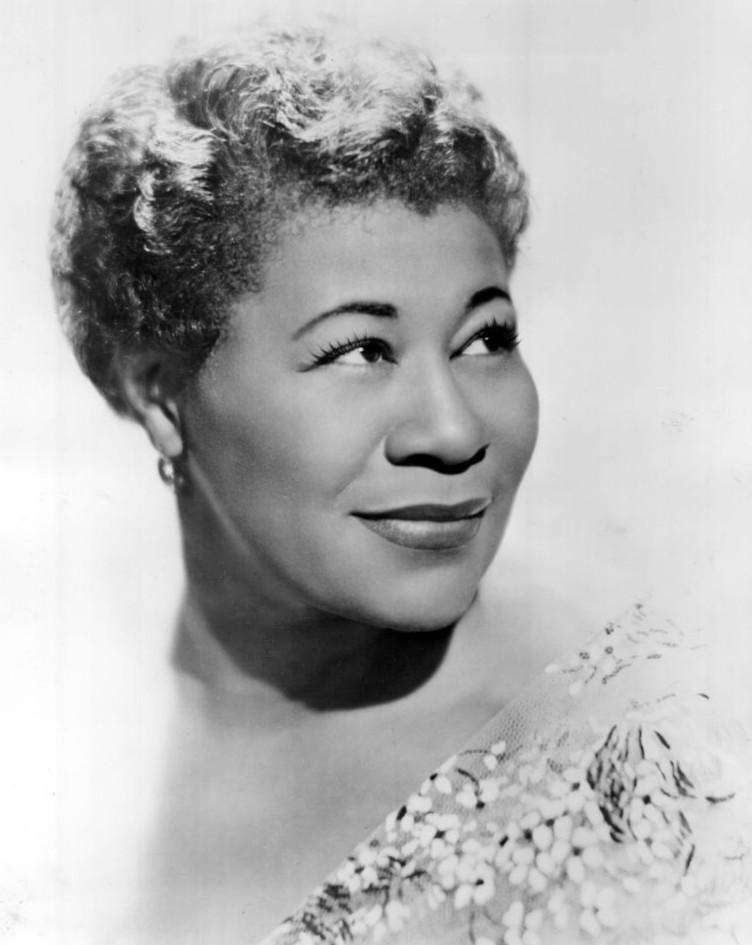
Ella Fitzgerald's The Ultimate Collection spent five weeks at number one in 2021.

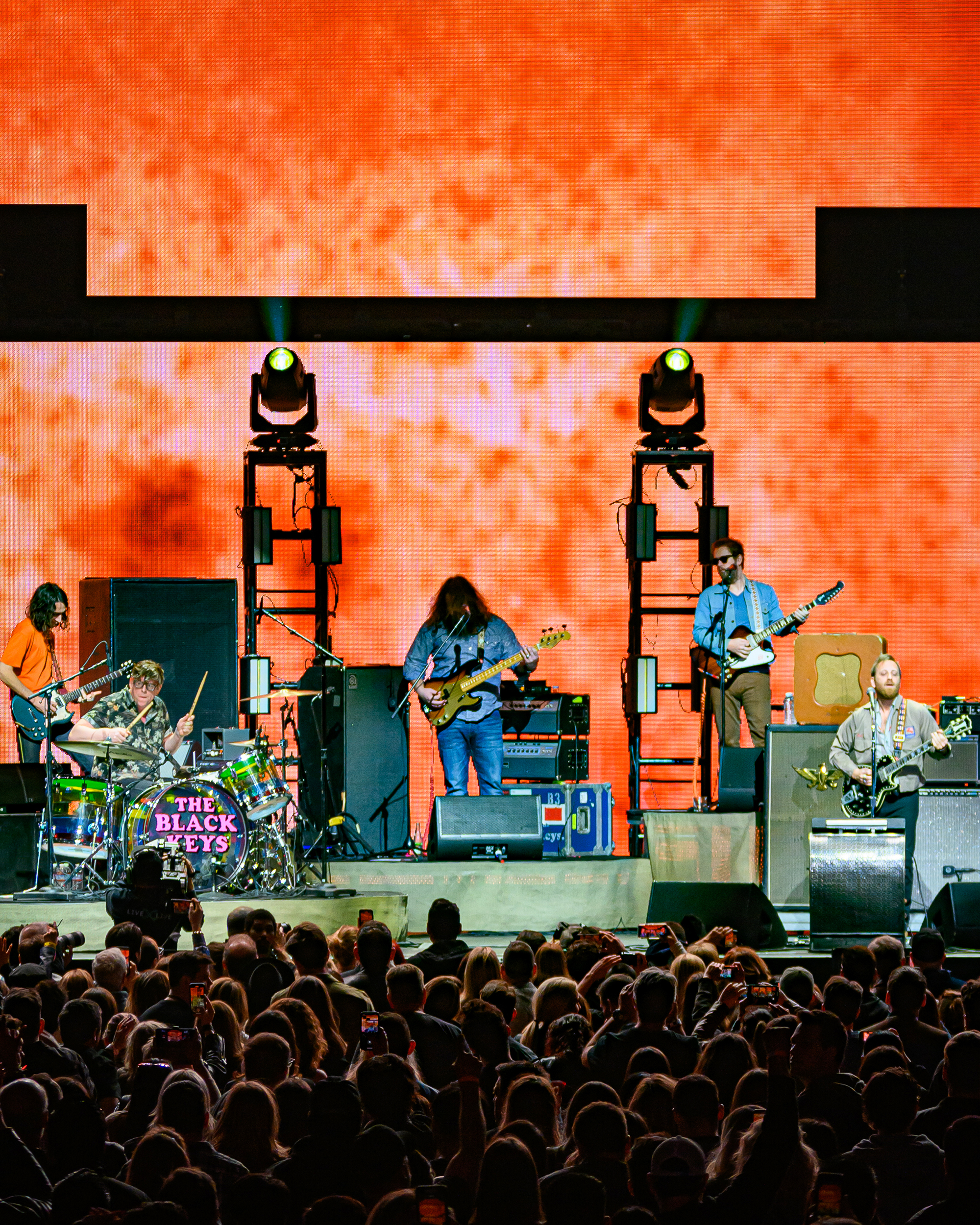
Delta Kream, the tenth album by The Black Keys, was also UK Jazz & Blues Albums Chart number one for five weeks.

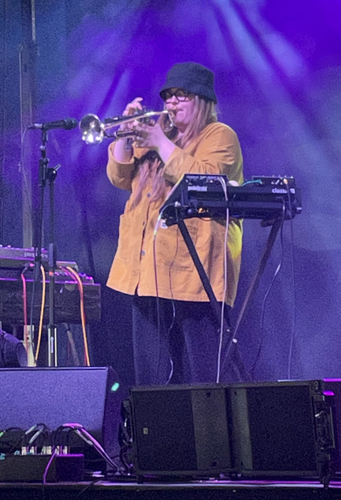
Emma-Jean Thackray topped three consecutive charts with her debut full-length album Yellow.

Issue date	Album	Artist(s)	Record label(s)	Ref.
1 January	The Best of Peter Green's Fleetwood Mac	Fleetwood Mac	Columbia	
8 January	The Best of Peter Green's Fleetwood Mac	Fleetwood Mac	Columbia	
15 January	Blue Note Re:Imagined	various artists	Decca	
22 January	Speak No Evil	Wayne Shorter	Blue Note	
29 January	Time Outtakes	Dave Brubeck Quartet	Wienerworld	
5 February	Tourist	St Germain	Blue Note	
12 February	Kind of Blue	Miles Davis	Columbia	
19 February	Somethin' Else	Cannonball Adderley	Blue Note	
26 February	Blue Note Re:Imagined	various artists	Decca	
5 March	Dark Matter	Moses Boyd	Exodus	
12 March	The Ultimate Collection	Ella Fitzgerald	UCJ	
19 March	The Ultimate Collection	Ella Fitzgerald	UCJ	
26 March	The Ultimate Collection	Ella Fitzgerald	UCJ	
2 April	Aspects	STR4TA	Brownswood	
9 April	The Ultimate Collection	Ella Fitzgerald	UCJ	
16 April	Moanin'	Art Blakey, The Jazz Messengers	Blue Note	
23 April	The Ultimate Collection	Ella Fitzgerald	UCJ	
30 April	Bring Backs	Alfa Mist	Anti-	
7 May	How Blue Can You Get	Gary Moore	Provogue	
14 May	Latest Record Project, Volume 1	Van Morrison	BMG	
21 May	Delta Kream	The Black Keys	Nonesuch	
28 May	Delta Kream	The Black Keys	Nonesuch	
4 June	Delta Kream	The Black Keys	Nonesuch	
11 June	Delta Kream	The Black Keys	Nonesuch	
18 June	Now Serving: Royal Tea Live from the Ryman	Joe Bonamassa	Provogue	
25 June	Delta Kream	The Black Keys	Nonesuch	
2 July	The Montreux Years	Nina Simone	BMG	
9 July	Aquarius	Toby Lee	Lee	
16 July	Aquarius	Toby Lee	Lee	
23 July	Champions: Rare Miles from the Complete Jack Johnson Sessions	Miles Davis	Sony	
30 July	Yellow	Emma-Jean Thackray	Warp	
6 August	Yellow	Emma-Jean Thackray	Warp	
13 August	Yellow	Emma-Jean Thackray	Warp	
20 August	Yellow	Emma-Jean Thackray	Warp	
27 August	Source	Nubya Garcia	Concord	
3 September	Pure	Robben Ford	ear	
10 September	Rory Gallagher	Rory Gallagher	UMC	
17 September	Side-Eye NYC (V1.IV)	Pat Metheny	BMG	
24 September	Mr. Luck: A Tribute to Jimmy Reed – Live at the Royal Albert Hall	Ronnie Wood	BMG	
1 October	The Blues Album	Joanne Shaw Taylor	KTBA	
8 October	Love for Sale	Tony Bennett, Lady Gaga	Interscope	
15 October	Love for Sale	Tony Bennett, Lady Gaga	Interscope	
22 October	Love for Sale	Tony Bennett, Lady Gaga	Interscope	
29 October	A Love Supreme: Live in Seattle	John Coltrane	Impulse!	
5 November	Time Clocks	Joe Bonamassa	Provogue	
12 November	Still Rising: The Collection	Gregory Porter	Decca	
19 November	Still Rising: The Collection	Gregory Porter	Decca	
26 November	Still Rising: The Collection	Gregory Porter	Decca	
3 December	Still Rising: The Collection	Gregory Porter	Decca	
10 December	Still Rising: The Collection	Gregory Porter	Decca	
17 December	Still Rising: The Collection	Gregory Porter	Decca	
24 December	Still Rising: The Collection	Gregory Porter	Decca	
31 December	Still Rising: The Collection	Gregory Porter	Decca	

== See also ==
- 2021 in British music
