= Come with Fierce Grace =

Studio album by Alabaster DePlume
- Released: 8 September 2023
- Recorded: 2020
- Genre: Jazz
- Length: 42:08
- Label: International Anthem

Alabaster DePlume chronology
Gold (2022)	Come with Fierce Grace (2023)	A Blade Because a Blade Is Whole (2025)

Come with Fierce Grace is the sixth studio album by British saxophonist Alabaster DePlume, released on 8 September 2023 through International Anthem Recording Company. It was recorded during the same improvisational 2020 sessions as DePlume's previous album, Gold (2022).

== Background and recording ==
The album, along with Gold, was recorded over two weeks in improvised sessions that DePlume later formed into songs, playing with musicians who were not given music before recording and not allowed to listen to the results.

== Critical reception ==
Professional ratings
Aggregate scores
Source	Rating
Metacritic	82/100
Review scores
Source	Rating
AllMusic	3.5/5 stars
The Guardian	4/5 stars
Mojo	4/5 stars
Pitchfork	7.5/10
Uncut	4/5 stars

Come with Fierce Grace received a score of 82 out of 100 on review aggregator Metacritic based on seven critics' reviews, indicating "universal acclaim". John Lewis of The Guardian found it to be "a looser, more eclectic counterpart" than Gold, remarking that DePlume "surrounds himself with fine musicians who push his simple songs into more challenging territory". In Pitchfork, Daniel Bromfield also contrasted the album to Gold, writing that it "is so spare that it could have been composed in the Stone Age" as "most of the album's expanse is taken up by percussion" and it "aspires" to "a raw, brutal immediacy".

Amanda Farah of The Quietus observed that Come with Fierce Grace has "a similar energy to its elder sibling but takes a more stripped-back approach" and while it has some "higher energy tracks", is also "filled with soft, lulling textures". Uncut opined that "this soulful, spiritual, experimental collection is a rich testament to the chemistry of collaboration", while Mojo stated that "Fairbairn's side-of-mouth playing is extraordinary bucking the universal post-millennial effort to out-blast Coltrane, in favour of beautifully gentle explorations which are both intrepid and sublimely calming".

Reviewing the album for AllMusic, Thom Jurek claimed that, "Given its laid-back, eerily nocturnal sonic profile, Come with Fierce Grace is easy to embrace on its own -- even if some tracks lack distinctive identities. No matter its release as a separate entity, Come with Fierce Grace is part and parcel of GOLD; it's not a mere sequel but a truly worthy companion album."

=== Accolades ===
Year-end lists for Come with Fierce Grace
Publication	List	Rank	Ref.
Uncut	Top 75 Albums of 2023	69	

== Track listing ==
Come with Fierce Grace track listing
No.	Title	Length
1.	"Sibomandi" (featuring Falle Nioke)	2:28
2.	"What Can It Take"	2:16
3.	"To That Voice and Say"	2:44
4.	"Greek Honey Slick" (featuring Tom Skinner)	4:33
5.	"Give Me Away"	3:13
6.	"Fall on Flowers"	4:53
7.	"Did You Know" (featuring Momoko Gill and MettaShiba)	3:54
8.	"Levels of Human"	1:52
9.	"Not Even Sobbing"	2:46
10.	"The Best Thing in the World"	4:40
11.	"Naked Like Water" (featuring Donna Thompson)	2:54
12.	"Broken Again"	5:55
Total length:		42:08

== Charts ==
Chart performance for Come with Fierce Grace
Chart (2023)	Peak position
UK Album Downloads (OCC)	37
