= New Future City Radio =

Studio album by Damon Locks and Rob Mazurek
- Released: July 28, 2023
- Genre: Jazz; experimental
- Length: 39:42
- Label: International Anthem

Damon Locks chronology
Now (2021)	New Future City Radio (2023)	List of Demands (2025)

Rob Mazurek chronology
Lightning Dreamers (2023)	New Future City Radio (2023)	Color Systems (2024)

New Future City Radio is a collaborative studio album by American musicians Damon Locks and Rob Mazurek. It was released on July 28, 2023 through International Anthem.

== Background ==
The album is composed of eighteen songs in the structure of a mixtape consisting of radio sounds, snippets of instrumental tracks and voiceovers. It is the first collaborative album by Locks and Mazurek, who collaborated on several other projects including Exploding Star Orchestra. The album's first single, "Yes", was released on May 23, 2023, alongside a music video directed by Locks and animated by Rob Shaw.

== Reception ==
Professional ratings
Review scores
Source	Rating
Pitchfork	6.9/10
AllMusic	3.5/5 stars

Pitchfork described the album as imagining "a clandestine broadcast from a not-so-distant future, playing up pirate radio's utopian impulse in order to raise alarm bells about the present." Uncut Magazine noted that "the whole album, across a wildly varied and genuinely unique 18 tracks, feels like tuning in to some kind of revolutionary post-apocalyptic radio station." AllMusic stated that New Future City Radio "addresses important questions about notions of community in the 21st century. It offers possibilities to learn, a collective resistance to injustice and oppression, and the potential to learn how to disseminate information, among themselves and over unregulated radio waves."

== Track listing ==
No.	Title	Length
1.	"5-4-3-2-1"	0:22
2.	"Yes!"	2:15
3.	"The Sun Returns"	2:27
4.	"Breeze of Time"	2:39
5.	"Your Name Gonna Ring the Bell"	1:07
6.	"New Future"	1:07
7.	"Droids!"	2:18
8.	"The Concord Hour"	5:08
9.	"Future City"	0:23
10.	"10mins Past the Hour"	0:17
11.	"Support the Youth (With Sound)"	1:19
12.	"The Beat"	0:55
13.	"Las Niñas Estan Escuchando [The Children Are Listening]"	0:19
14.	"Flitting Splits Reverb Adage"	3:56
15.	"Twilight Shimmer"	9:53
16.	"Suspense in the Grip of Suspense"	3:58
17.	"Polaris Radio"	1:10
18.	"Drop"	0:09
Total length:		39:42

== Personnel ==
- Damon Locks – vocals, sampler & album art
- Rob Mazurek – vocals, trumpet, sampler, synthesizer, flute
- Mauricio Takara – percussion (tracks 12, 14)
- Roberto Carlos Lange – vocals (track 14)
- Brandi Augustus – vocals (track 6)
- Rosetta Carr – vocals (track 3)
- Andres Hernandez – vocals (track 8)
- Alain Clapham – vocals (track 10)
- Brenda Hernandez – vocals (track 13)
- Dave Vettraino – recording & engineering
- David Allen – mastering
