= Recordings from the Åland Islands =

Studio album by Jeremiah Chiu and Marta Sofia Honer
- Released: March 11, 2022
- Studio: Åland Islands
- Length: 42:24
- Label: International Anthem
- Producers: Jeremiah Chiu; Marta Sofia Honer

Jeremiah Chiu and Marta Sofia Honer chronology
| Recordings from the Åland Islands (2022) | Different Rooms (2025) |

Recordings from the Åland Islands is a collaborative studio album by American musicians Jeremiah Chiu and Marta Sofia Honer. It was released on March 11, 2022, through International Anthem Recording Company. It received universal acclaim from critics.

== Background ==
Jeremiah Chiu is an American graphic designer and electronic music composer based in Los Angeles. Marta Sofia Honer is an American violist, violinist, educator, and session musician based in Los Angeles.

Recordings from the Åland Islands is Chiu and Honer's first collaborative album. In 2017, they traveled to the Åland Islands, an archipelago in the Baltic Sea, to help their friends open a hotel. In 2019, they returned to the islands to perform at a 14th-century church. They edited this performance and incorporated it with the field recordings and jam sessions from their first trip.

== Release ==
The album was released on March 11, 2022, through International Anthem Recording Company. Music videos were released for "Stureby House Piano" and "Snåcko".

== Critical reception ==
Professional ratings
Aggregate scores
| Source | Rating |
|---|---|
| Metacritic | 85/100 |
Review scores
| Source | Rating |
| Beats Per Minute | 80% |
| Mojo | 4/5 stars |
| Pitchfork | 7.7/10 |
| PopMatters | 9/10 |

According to the review aggregator Metacritic, Recordings from the Åland Islands received "universal acclaim" based on a weighted average score of 85 out of 100 from 4 critic scores.

Ray Finlayson of Beats Per Minute wrote, "the album seamlessly melds the two artists' worlds into one sound that is hazily beautiful, curiously beguiling, and transportingly languid." He added, "Listening to the album feels like a guided tour through the routes on the island that are off the beaten path; it captures that starry wide-eyed wonder that seeing an impressive new landscape brings." Jayson Greene of Pitchfork stated, "I have never been to the Åland Islands, but the place that Chiu and Honer depict on record is impossibly beautiful, the kind of fragile paradise that might be better left unspoiled by human observation."

=== Accolades ===
Year-end lists for Recordings from the Åland Islands
| Publication | List | Rank | Ref. |
|---|---|---|---|
| Mojo | Top 75 Albums of 2022 | 73 | |

== Track listing ==
All tracks are written by Jeremiah Chiu and Marta Sofia Honer.

Recordings from the Åland Islands track listing
| No. | Title | Length |
|---|---|---|
| 1. | "In Åland Air" | 3:14 |
| 2. | "On the Other Sea" | 4:13 |
| 3. | "Snåcko" | 4:47 |
| 4. | "Stureby House Piano" | 4:59 |
| 5. | "Rocky Passage" | 1:40 |
| 6. | "Kumlinge Kyrka" | 2:32 |
| 7. | "Voices" | 0:58 |
| 8. | "By Foot, By Sea" | 6:32 |
| 9. | "Anna's Organ" | 2:38 |
| 10. | "Archipelago" | 7:09 |
| 11. | "Under the Midnight Sun" | 3:42 |
| Total length: | | 42:24 |

IA11 digital edition (2025) bonus tracks
| No. | Title | Length |
|---|---|---|
| 12. | "ÅRTV 682019" | 3:56 |
| 13. | "Crossings" | 2:11 |
| 14. | "On the Other Sea (Live Edit from Brownswood Basement)" | 7:42 |

== Personnel ==
Credits adapted from liner notes.

- Jeremiah Chiu – piano, organs, modular synthesizer, Crumar Performer, Juno-60, CS01, OP-1, bass guitar, field recordings, performance, production, mixing, layout
- Marta Sofia Honer – viola, Crumar Performer, hand chimes, performance, production, verso images
- John McEntire – processing (1)
- Sean Pecknold – additional field recordings (4, 7, 8)
- Stephen Honer – flute (10)
- Dave Vettraino – mixing
- Regina Martinez – mixing
- David Allen – mastering
- Joyce Kim – cover image
