= Gold (Alabaster DePlume album) =

Studio album by Alabaster DePlume
- Released: 1 April 2022
- Recorded: 2020
- Genre: Jazz
- Length: 67:00
- Label: International Anthem
- Producer: Kristian Craig Robinson

Alabaster DePlume chronology
I Was Not Sleeping (2020)	Gold (2022)	Come with Fierce Grace (2023)

Gold, also known with its subtitle as Gold – Go Forward in the Courage of Your Love, is the fifth studio album by British saxophonist Alabaster DePlume, released on 1 April 2022 through International Anthem Recording Company. It was recorded in 2020.

== Background and recording ==
The album was recorded over two weeks in improvised sessions that DePlume later formed into songs, playing with musicians who were not given music before recording and not allowed to listen to the results.

== Critical reception ==
Professional ratings
Aggregate scores
Source	Rating
Metacritic	81/100
Review scores
Source	Rating
Clash	8/10
Mojo	4/5 stars
The Observer	4/5 stars
Pitchfork	8.4/10
Uncut	8/10

Gold received a score of 81 out of 100 on review aggregator Metacritic based on six critics' reviews, indicating "universal acclaim". Pitchfork gave the album their "Best New Music" distinction, with reviewer Sadie Sartini Garner describing it as a "warm and wise album" as well as "a balm of spoken word and spiritual jazz, both strangely uncomfortable and strangely comforting". Garner also found that "despite its evangelical spirit and its benedictory subtitle", the album "is aimed primarily at its creator". Amelia Kelly of Clash wrote that the album "develops as an incredibly unique record. Every second of the precious hour and seven minutes is dedicated to vulnerability and collective politics" and "Alabaster's craftsmanship is timeless" despite the short recording period.

Mojo found the album to be "thought-provoking yet full of fun" as "DePlume's willingness to dig deep has turned up a genuine treasure". Uncut opined that the "highlight is the backing, which drifts between spiritual jazz, skeletal dub and folksy minimalism, all the time featuring Fairbairn's quiet, quavering tenor sax improvisations". The Observer's Neil Spencer felt that the tracks "mix DePlume's hushed declamations with his tenor sax", concluding that "a conventional jazzer DePlume isn't, but he has found a dedicated constituency outside the mainstream. An intriguing artist."

=== Accolades ===
Year-end lists for Gold
Publication	List	Rank	Ref.
Albumism	The 100 Best Albums of 2022	46	
The Guardian	The 50 Best Albums of 2022	40	
Mojo	The 50 Best Albums of 2022	42	

== Track listing ==
Gold track listing
No.	Title	Length
1.	"A Gente Acaba (Vento Em Rosa)"	2:44
2.	"Don't Forget You're Precious"	3:41
3.	"Fucking Let Them"	2:13
4.	"The World Is Mine"	3:52
5.	"The Sound of My Feet on This Earth Is a Song to Your Spirit"	3:07
6.	"I'm Gonna Say Seven"	3:00
7.	"Do You Know a Human Being When You See One?"	3:07
8.	"Visitors Yt15b – Jerusalem, Palestine"	3:59
9.	"I'm Good at Not Crying"	3:24
10.	"Now (Stars Are Lit)"	3:40
11.	"Again" (featuring Falle Nioke)	3:14
12.	"Mrs Calamari"	4:23
13.	"People: What's the Difference?"	3:20
14.	"Visitors Xt8b – Oak"	1:38
15.	"Who Is a Fool"	3:16
16.	"I Will Not Be Safe"	2:16
17.	"Visitors Yt15 – Krupp Steel Condition Pivot"	4:15
18.	"Broken Like"	5:18
19.	"Now (Pink Triangle, Blue Valley)"	7:06
Total length:		67:00

== Charts ==
Chart performance for Gold
Chart (2022)	Peak position
UK Album Downloads (Official Charts)	69
UK Independent Albums (Official Charts)	37
