= List of Demands =

Studio album by Damon Locks
- Released: January 31, 2025
- Studio: Experimental Sound; IARC
- Genre: Jazz; hip-hop; spoken word; sound collage
- Length: 31:59
- Label: International Anthem
- Producer: Damon Locks

Damon Locks chronology
| New Future City Radio (2023) | List of Demands (2025) |

List of Demands is the fourth studio album by American musician Damon Locks. It was released on January 31, 2025, through International Anthem Recording Company. It received universal acclaim from critics.

== Background ==
List of Demands was Locks' first album to be widely distributed. Prior to the release of the album, Locks self-released a limited edition album in 2024, titled 3D Sonic Adventure, which was only available on vinyl, with 250 copies made. It was described as a spoken word album, incorporating jazz, hip-hop, and sound collage.

List of Demands contains performances by Locks, Krista Franklin, Ralph Darden, Ben LaMar Gay, and Macie Stewart. It was released on January 31, 2025, through International Anthem Recording Company.

== Critical reception ==
Professional ratings
Aggregate scores
| Source | Rating |
|---|---|
| Metacritic | 85/100 |
Review scores
| Source | Rating |
| AllMusic | 4.5/5 stars |
| Mojo | 4/5 stars |
| Pitchfork | 7.7/10 |
| Record Collector | 4/5 stars |

According to the review aggregator Metacritic, List of Demands received "universal acclaim" based on a weighted average score of 85 out of 100 from 5 critic scores.

AllMusic described the album as "both archival and of the present -- engrossing and energizing, to be blasted from every boombox," while The Wall Street Journal called it a combination of "jazz, poetry and archival sounds on an album of category-defying sonic collages." Chicago Tribune referred to it as "a dense, tour-de-force collection of improvisational jazz and punk poetry that enhances this musical legacy." BrooklynVegan described the album as "coming off like speeches from a civil rights march set to a backdrop of jazz instrumentation and hip hop production."

=== Accolades ===
Year-end lists for List of Demands
| Publication | List | Rank | Ref. |
|---|---|---|---|
| AllMusic | AllMusic Best of 2025 | — | |
| The Wire | Releases of the Year (2025 Rewind) | 22 | |

== Track listing ==
All tracks are written by Damon Locks, except "High Priestess" (lyrics by Krista Franklin, music by Locks).

List of Demands track listing
| No. | Title | Length |
|---|---|---|
| 1. | "Reversed" | 1:58 |
| 2. | "Distance" | 4:26 |
| 3. | "Holding the Dawn in Place (Beyond Pt. 2)" | 3:37 |
| 4. | "Everything's Under Control" | 0:33 |
| 5. | "Isn't It Beautiful" | 2:55 |
| 6. | "High Priestess" | 2:38 |
| 7. | "Meteors of Fear" | 2:24 |
| 8. | "List of Demands" | 2:56 |
| 9. | "The Signal Is Hot" | 1:44 |
| 10. | "Control Power" | 0:30 |
| 11. | "Click" | 5:13 |
| 12. | "Reversed Pt. 2 (Something to Love)" | 3:05 |
| Total length: | | 31:59 |

== Personnel ==
Credits adapted from the album's liner notes and Tidal.

- Damon Locks – voice, electronics, programming, production, cover art, graphic design
- Krista Franklin – voice (on "High Priestess")
- Ralph Darden – drums (on "Isn't It Beautiful"), turntables (on "Meteors of Fear")
- Ben LaMar Gay – cornet (on "Holding the Dawn in Place"), melodica (on "Click")
- Macie Stewart – violin (on "Distance" and "Isn't It Beautiful")
- Alex Inglizian – recording
- Dave Vettraino – recording, mixing
- David Allen – mastering
- Craig Hansen – graphic design

== Charts ==
Chart performance for List of Demands
| Chart (2025) | Peak position |
|---|---|
| UK Album Downloads (OCC) | 87 |
