= Where Future Unfolds =

Studio album by Damon Locks
- Released: June 28, 2019
- Recorded: Garfield Park Conservatory, Chicago
- Genre: Jazz; experimental
- Length: 46:36
- Label: International Anthem

Damon Locks chronology
Where Future Unfolds (2019)	Now (2021)

Where Future Unfolds is the debut studio album by American musician Damon Locks and his jazz group Black Monument Ensemble. It was released on June 28, 2019, through International Anthem.

== Background ==
The album consists of ten tracks from Black Monument Ensemble's live performance at the Garfield Park Botanical Conservatory in 2018.

== Reception ==
Professional ratings
Review scores
Source	Rating
AllMusic	4/5 stars
All About Jazz	4/5 stars
Pitchfork	8/10 stars

AllMusic described Where Future Unfolds as a "complex, but relatively accessible work of avant garde, activist, socio-political jazz, soul and poetry" and "a major work that should be encountered by anyone remotely interested in modern aural and performance art, improvisation and truth." All About Jazz referred to the album as "a real communal experience, Where Future Unfolds shows activism and artistry still in tandem, just as suffering and the spiritual life have often been." Echoes and Dust called it "a project he devoted quite a bit of time to prepare, but it was time well spent with mesmerizing effect at moments." Pitchfork stated about Where Future Unfolds, "The Chicago-based improvisational artist layers politically charged sound collages over drum machines and a children's choir. The result is uplifting activist jazz for tumultuous times."

== Track listing ==
No.	Title	Length
1.	"Statement of Intent / Black Monument Theme"	5:45
2.	"Sounds Like Now"	6:25
3.	"Solar Power"	5:54
4.	"Rebuild A Nation"	2:40
5.	"Which I Believe It Will"	3:04
6.	"Which I Believe I Am"	1:13
7.	"The Colors That You Bring"	5:54
8.	"The Future?"	4:32
9.	"Power"	4:57
10.	"From A Spark To A Fire"	6:12
Total length:		46:36
