= Now (Damon Locks album) =

NOW

Studio album by Damon Locks and Black Music Ensemble
- Released: April 9, 2021
- Recorded: Experimental Sound Studio, Chicago
- Genre: Spoken word; jazz; gospel
- Length: 30:30
- Label: International Anthem

Damon Locks and Black Music Ensemble chronology
| Where Future Unfolds (2019) | NOW (2021) | New Future City Radio (2023) |

Now is the second studio album by American musician Damon Locks and his jazz ensemble Black Monument Ensemble. It was released on April 9, 2021, through International Anthem.

== Reception ==
Professional ratings
Review scores
| Source | Rating |
|---|---|
| AllMusic | 3.5/5 stars |
| Pitchfork | 7.7/10 |
| All About Jazz | 7/10 stars |

Thom Jurek of AllMusic stated about the album, "Based on the profundity of its content and the jagged beauty in its execution, Now belongs in the pantheon of culturally important works" that "join socio-political polemics to spirituality and kaleidoscopically expressive art in edifying all who encounter them." Pitchfork's Steven Arroyo remarked that "NOW bleeds with the awareness that tomorrow is never guaranteed. The most self-affirming thing that you can do, then, is to claim your time, to fill it with your own noise." Stereogum wrote "NOW is a document of a historic, shuddering year in real time, and as such it is not so much a definitive statement or a piece of documentary for something we were all still living through," while All About Jazz described Now as "a mix of spoken word, jazz, gospel and other retained Africanisms." The New York Times stated "On Now, Locks purposely left studio chatter on the album to underline the band's kinship."

== Track listing ==
| No. | Title | Length |
|---|---|---|
| 1. | "Now (Forever Momentary Space)" | 7:05 |
| 2. | "The People Vs the Rest of Us" | 3:34 |
| 3. | "Keep Your Mind Free" | 5:54 |
| 4. | "Barbara Jones-Hogu and Elizabeth Catlett Discuss Liberation" | 1:55 |
| 5. | "Movement and You" | 1:38 |
| 6. | "The Body Is Electric" | 10:24 |
| Total length: | | 30:30 |
