= Yowzers =

Studio album by Ben LaMar Gay
- Released: June 6, 2025
- Recorded: 2023–2024
- Studios: Palisade Studios, Chicago; International Anthem Studios, Chicago
- Length: 44:12
- Label: International Anthem
- Producer: Ben LaMar Gay

Ben LaMar Gay chronology
Open Arms to Open Us (2021)	Yowzers (2025)

Singles from Yowzers
- 1. "Yowzers" Released: April 22, 2025

Yowzers is the third studio album by American cornetist Ben LaMar Gay. It was released on June 6, 2025, via International Anthem in LP, CD and digital formats.

== Background ==
The recording for the album occurred at Palisade Studios and International Anthem Studios in Chicago. The album was produced by Gay and received instrumentation contributions from Tommaso Moretti, Will Faber, Matthew Davis, and Rob Frye, in addition to vocalists Tramaine Parker, Ugochi Nwaogwugwu, and Ayanna Woods.

It was preceded by Gay's 2018 debut project, Downtown Castles Can Never Block the Sun, and his 2021 second album, Open Arms to Open Us. Gay stated about the title in an interview with Uncut that it was derived from "the sound of my internal shout and sigh" and "a playful sound that reminds me of the rebelliousness of joy and the wild adventure of trying to reach its centre." On April 22, 2025, the title track was released as the first single.

== Reception ==
Professional ratings
Aggregate scores
Source	Rating
Metacritic	83/100
Review scores
Source	Rating
Mojo	4/5 stars
Uncut	8/10 stars

According to the review aggregator Metacritic, Yowzers received "universal acclaim" based on a weighted average score of 83 out of 100 from 5 critic scores.

Louis Pattison of Uncut described the album as "a rich and emotional record that is simultaneously steeped in tradition but utterly contemporary; avant-garde in approach, but conducted with the lively enthusiasm of a front-porch jam," rating it eight out of ten. Andy Cowan of Mojo rated it four stars and remarked, "It's idiomatic of the restless playfulness of Yowzers, an unpredictable album, largely crafted in the round with his multi-tasking band."

Writing for the Quietus, Antonio Poscic remarked, "While the variety of styles and approaches on display is mesmerising if not dizzying, the cuts on Yowzers feel as if they truly belong together, connected by an intangible thread – a sensibility which eclipses pure aesthetics and bridges concepts, worlds, and compositions across boundaries."

=== Accolades ===
Year-end lists for Yowzers
Publication	List	Rank	Ref.
The Wire	Releases of the Year (2025 Rewind)	44	

== Track listing ==
All tracks are written by Ben LaMar Gay.

Yowzers track listing
No.	Title	Length
1.	"Yowzers"	2:22
2.	"The Glorification of Small Victories"	4:57
3.	"There, Inside the Morning Glory"	5:11
4.	"Roller Skates"	0:49
5.	"For Breezy"	3:13
6.	"I Am (Bells)"	6:12
7.	"Promontory"	2:12
8.	"John, John Henry"	3:46
9.	"Damn You Cute"	3:51
10.	"Cumulus"	7:02
11.	"Touch"	2:13
12.	"Leave Some for You"	3:24
Total length:		44:12

== Personnel ==
Credits adapted from Bandcamp.

- Ben LaMar Gay – cornet, voice, synth, bells, diddley bow, percussion, programming, manipulations
- Tommaso Moretti – drums, percussion, voice
- Matthew Davis – tuba, piano, bells, voice
- Will Faber – guitar, ngoni, bells, voice
- Rob Frye – flute, bass clarinet
- Ayanna Woods – voice
- Tramaine Parker – voice
- Ugochi Nwaogwugwu – voice
- Dave Vettraino – recording, mixing
- Scott McNiece – sequencing
- David Allen – mastering
- A. Martinez – artwork
- Aaron Lowell Denton – layout, design
