= The Broadcasting System =

Studio album by Trenchmouth
- Released: May 7, 1996
- Genre: Punk rock; dub
- Length: 40:16
- Label: Skene!
- Producer: Casey Rice

Trenchmouth chronology
Volumes, Amplifiers, Equalizers (1994)	The Broadcasting System (1996)

The Broadcasting System is the fourth and final studio album by American post-hardcore band Trenchmouth. Produced by Casey Rice, it was released on May 7, 1996 through Skene! Records. The album marks as a shift to bass-heavy dub sound from the band's post-hardcore/math rock style.

The band broke up following the release of The Broadcasting System. Inspired by the new sound on the album, the band members Damon Locks and Wayne Montana formed the band The Eternals.

== Critical reception ==
Professional ratings
Review scores
Source	Rating
Allmusic	4/5 stars

Allmusic critic Joshua Glazer described the album as "an under-recognized example of the mid-'90s indie scene's fascination with dub/reggae studio techniques." Glazer further wrote: "Although lacking in the power and diversity of Trenchmouth's previous album, Trenchmouth Vs. the Light of the Sun, The Broadcasting System is a masterful example of the long standing affinity between punk rock and Jamaican music."

== Track listing ==
1. "Picking Up Interference" – 1:33
2. "Broadcasting from the Heart" – 6:33
3. "The Fire and Wire Colossus" – 4:34
4. "In High Contrast" – 5:16
5. "Moving with Momentum" – 4:42
6. "Overthrower" – 2:43
7. "Contrast Beneath the Surface" – 5:23
8. "Onus" – 4:57
9. "Interference" – 4:35

== Personnel ==
Album credits as adapted from the liner notes.

Trenchmouth

- Fred Armisen – drums, percussion, piano, backing vocals
- Chris DeZutter – guitar
- Damon Locks – vocals, art direction; mixing (2, 7)
- Wayne Montana – bass guitar; mixing (7)

Other personnel

- Casey Rice – production, mixing, engineering, backing vocals; sounds, programming (as "Designer")
- Richard Warfield Smith – organ, melodica; mixing (1, 7)
