= Jeremiah Chiu =

- Also known as: Cosmic Son
- Born: Chicago, Illinois, US
- Origin: Los Angeles, California, US
- Genre: Electronic
- Occupations: Graphic designer; composer
- Instrument: Synthesizer
- Years active: 2010s–present
- Label: International Anthem
- Member of: SML
- Formerly of: Icy Demons, Chandeliers

Jeremiah Chiu is an American graphic designer and electronic music composer. He is a member of the band SML.

== Early life ==
Jeremiah Chiu was born in Chicago, Illinois. He is of Taiwanese descent. As a child, he played piano and violin. In 2008, he received his MFA in Graphic Design from the University of Illinois Chicago. In 2014, he moved to Los Angeles, California.

== Career ==
In 2022, Chiu released Recordings from the Åland Islands, a collaborative album with Marta Sofia Honer. The source material of the album was recorded in the Åland Islands, an archipelago in the Baltic Sea.

Chiu then released a solo album, In Electric Time (2023). The album was recorded during a two-day visit to the Vintage Synthesizer Museum in Los Angeles, California, and later edited in two days.

In 2024, Chiu released The Closest Thing to Silence, a collaborative album with Ariel Kalma and Honer. The trio previously collaborated to work on a session for BBC Radio 3's Late Junction series in 2022.

Chiu and Honer collaborated again for another duo album, Different Rooms (2025). It features guest appearances from Jeff Parker and Josh Johnson.

In 2026, Chiu released a solo album, Edge Conditions. It includes contributions from Takako Minekawa, Booker Stardrum, Marta Sofia Honer, Ben Lumsdaine, Marquis Hill, Will Miller, and Patrick Shiroishi.

Chiu is a member of SML, along with Anna Butterss, Josh Johnson, Booker Stardrum, and Gregory Uhlmann. The band released Small Medium Large (2024), How You Been (2025), and Spontaneous Music Live (2026).

== Discography ==
=== Solo albums ===
- Moon Surf (as Cosmic Son; Pretty All Right, 2015)
- In Electric Time (International Anthem, 2023)
- Edge Conditions (International Anthem, 2026)

=== Collaborative albums ===
- Recordings from the Åland Islands (with Marta Sofia Honer; International Anthem, 2022)
- The Closest Thing to Silence (with Ariel Kalma and Marta Sofia Honer; International Anthem, 2024)
- Different Rooms (with Marta Sofia Honer; International Anthem, 2025)

=== SML albums ===
- Small Medium Large (International Anthem, 2024)
- How You Been (International Anthem, 2025)
- Spontaneous Music Live (International Anthem, 2026)
