= A Blade Because a Blade Is Whole =

Studio album by Alabaster DePlume
- Released: 7 March 2025
- Studio: Total Refreshment Centre
- Length: 42:33
- Label: International Anthem
- Producer: Alabaster DePlume

Alabaster DePlume chronology
| Come with Fierce Grace (2023) | A Blade Because a Blade Is Whole (2025) |

Singles from A Blade Because a Blade Is Whole
- 1. "Oh My Actual Days" Released: 22 January 2025

A Blade Because a Blade Is Whole is the seventh studio album by English jazz musician Alabaster DePlume. It was released on 7 March 2025 by International Anthem.

== Background ==
The lead single of the album, "Oh My Actual Days", was released on 22 January 2025. It features a music video directed by Rebecca Salvadori.

== Critical reception ==
Professional ratings
Aggregate scores
| Source | Rating |
|---|---|
| Metacritic | 81/100 |
Review scores
| Source | Rating |
| AllMusic | 4/5 stars |
| Pitchfork | 8/10 stars |
| The Guardian | 4/5 stars |
| The Skinny | 5/5 stars |

According to the review aggregator Metacritic, A Blade Because a Blade Is Whole received "universal acclaim" based on a weighted average score of 81 out of 100 from 10 critic scores.

AllMusic's Thom Jurek stated that it is "a brave record that confronts pain while embraces it with humility, acceptance, and yes, vulnerability, and brings his spiritual and creative worlds together." Reviewing the album for Pitchfork, Matthew Blackwell assigned it a rating of eight out of ten, stating "A Blade is about responsibility to oneself and to others, and the ways in which those responsibilities overlap. To heal others, you must heal yourself, and to heal yourself, you must confront discomfort." Alexis Petridis of The Guardian noted that "At heart, A Blade Because a Blade Is Whole is packed with beautiful music, that seems to affect listeners emotionally far more effectively than the words. You could take that as a failing, but it isn't: after all, that's what music is for." Writing in The Quietus, Adam Clarke referred to it as "a meticulous, focused record that concerns DePlume's own efforts to heal himself." The Skinny's Vicky Kavanagh rated it five stars out of five, writing "Like the cover image, the record is a simple yet beautifully executed reminder to reflect, find healing and resist vanity."

== Track listing ==
All tracks are written by Angus Fairbarn; "Salty Road Dogs Victory Anthem" co-composed with Conrad Singh, Momoko Gill, and Rozi Plain.

| No. | Title | Length |
|---|---|---|
| 1. | "Oh My Actual Days" | 3:47 |
| 2. | "Thank You My Pain" | 2:59 |
| 3. | "Invincibility" | 3:07 |
| 4. | "Form a V" | 3:06 |
| 5. | "A Paper Man" | 4:53 |
| 6. | "Who Are You Telling, Gus" | 3:56 |
| 7. | "Prayer for my Sovereign Dignity" | 4:01 |
| 8. | "Kuzushi" | 2:40 |
| 9. | "Salty Road Dogs Victory Anthem" | 3:56 |
| 10. | "Too True" | 2:34 |
| 11. | "That Was My Garden" | 7:34 |
| Total length: | | 42:33 |

== Personnel ==
Credits adapted from the album's liner notes.

=== Musicians ===
- Alabaster DePlume – voice, tenor saxophone, baritone saxophone, acoustic guitar, electric guitar, bass, synthesizers
- Conrad Singh – guitar
- Donna Thompson – drums, voice, vocal arrangement for "Invincibility"
- Hannah Miller – cello
- John Ellis – piano
- Macie Stewart – violin, string arrangements
- Mikey Kenney – violin, voice
- Momoko Gill – voice, drums, string arrangement for "Form a V"
- Rozi Plain – bass guitar
- Ruth Goller – bass, voice

=== Technical and visuals ===
- Alabaster DePlume – production, engineering and recording for "Invincibility", "Kuushi", and "Too True"
- Kristian Craig Robinson – engineering and recording for all tracks except "Invincibility", "Kuushi", and "Too True"
- Dave Vettraino – strings engineering
- Dilip Harris – mixing
- David Allen – mastering
- Rebecca Salvadori – artwork
- Chris Almeida – portrait photo
- Aaron Lowell Denton – design, layout

== Charts ==
Chart performance for A Blade Because a Blade Is Whole
| Chart (2025) | Peak position |
|---|---|
| UK Album Downloads (OCC) | 73 |
