= Actionslacks =

American indie rock band

- Origin: Bay Area, California
- Genres: Indie rock; post-punk; power pop
- Years active: 1994–2012
- Labels: Skene!; Arena Rock Recording Company; Self-Starter Foundation; Post-Parlo
- Members: Tim Scanlin (vocals, guitar); Marty Kelly (drums); Ross Murray (bass); Chuck Lindo (guitar, vocals)
- Past members: Mark Wijsen (bass, vocals); Aaron Rubin (bass); Doug Modie (guitar, vocals); Darice Bailey (keyboards, vocals)
- Website: slacksaction.com

Actionslacks is an American indie rock band formed in 1994 in the San Francisco Bay Area. The band has long been associated with the region's noise pop scene.

== History ==
Actionslacks formed in Northern California's East Bay in 1994 when ex-Pillbox members Tim Scanlin and Mark Wijsen met drummer Marty Kelly and discovered a mutual appreciation of late-70s English punk rock, 1980s American post-punk and guitar-based New Zealand indie rock. The band played one gig in Berkeley, California under the name King Friday but changed their name after Scanlin realized he "just couldn't be in a band named after a puppet."

The band soon became a regular on the San Francisco and West Coast club circuit and released the "Tugboat Mutiny" b/w "A.C.R.O.N.Y.M." 7-inch single on their own Permanent Records imprint. In 1996 the band's first full-length, Too Bright, Just Right, Good Night was released on the Minneapolis Skene! label. Actionslacks' second LP, One Word (a reference to the spelling of their name as well as a nod to the influence of Overwhelming Colorfast's second album Two Words) was recorded in 1997 and released in 1998 by the Arena Rock Recording Company. The band toured with labelmates Harvey Danger and an ascendant Death Cab for Cutie in support of the record.

Wijsen left the band in late-1998 and Scanlin and Kelly began working on more pop-oriented songs, first with producers Greg Freeman (Pell Mell, Virginia Dare) and Jeff Palmer (Granfalloon Bus, Sunny Day Real Estate, Mommyheads) and later with new band members Aaron Rubin (bass; Mr. T Experience, Samiam) and Chuck Lindo (guitar and vocals; The Nukes, Jumbo Shrimp, The American Professionals). The Scene's Out of Sight was recorded in the fall of 1999 with producer/engineer (and Jawbox-frontperson) J. Robbins at John Vanderslice's Tiny Telephone Studios and released in early 2001 by the Self-Starter Foundation. The band's following grew in part due to well-timed promotions with Napster, various song placements in television shows and video games, and a strong showing on college radio. Prior to touring in support of the album, Rubin left the band and Lindo took time off to attend to other projects. Enter new permanent bassist Ross Murray and touring guitarist/singer Doug Modie.

In 2002, Scanlin moved to Los Angeles and the band began a continuing long-distance relationship. Full Upright Position was written and recorded between 2001 and 2003 in various studios in California and Washington, DC. J. Robbins once again engineered and the band produced, venturing into the far-ranging territory of multi-instrumentation, elaborate arrangements and stylistic diversity (including elements of pop, alt-country and electronica). The album's release was complicated by Kelly's relocation to Maine in late 2003 and record label issues. Nevertheless, the band managed to tour both the East and West coasts, adding keyboard/vocalist Darice Bailey to help reproduce the band's new sound. Actionslacks took a semi-hiatus beginning in late 2004, with occasional live appearances and writing sessions amid individual projects, careers, and family life.

In early 2008, the band was reinvigorated by the idea of a new writing and recording paradigm, writing new tracks via online collaboration and meeting up at Tiny Telephone to rehearse and record over the course of 8 days with engineer Aaron Prellwitz. The resulting collection, which marks a return to the aggressive yet tuneful punk sound of The Scene's Out of Sight, was self-released as Kids With Guitars in spring 2009. Downloaders were invited to pay however much they wished for the record.

The long-distance writing approach was repeated in late 2009 and also culminated in a recording session at Tiny Telephone. While gathered the band celebrated its 15th anniversary with a show at the Bottom of the Hill. The six songs recorded during the session ultimately made up the band's final release, 2012's self-titled EP.

== Discography ==
=== Albums ===
- Too Bright, Just Right, Good Night (Skene! 1996)
- One Word (The Arena Rock Recording Company, 1998)
- The Scene's Out of Sight (Self-Starter Foundation, 2001)
- Full Upright Position (Self-Starter Foundation, 2004)
- Full Upright Position Acoustic Companion (Actionslacks, 2004)

=== Extended plays ===
- Never Never Shake Baby EP (Post-Parlo, 2002)
- Kids With Guitars (Actionslacks/Eenie Meeny Miney Music, 2009)
- Actionslacks (Actionslacks/Eenie Meeny Miney Music, 2012)

=== Singles ===
- "Tugboat Mutiny" b/w "A.C.R.O.N.Y.M" / "Space-Age Heart" (permanent records, 1995)
- "John Hughes" b/w "Operator (That's Not the Way It Feels)" (Go Zombie!, 1996)

=== Compilations ===
- "John L. Sullivan" (recorded live at the Bottom of the Hill, San Francisco) on Ten Years of Noise Pop (2002)
- "Annie Oakley" and "Perfect G" on Inside X (Games) DVD and CD Sampler (2004)
- "Iodine" on Until the Shaking Stops: A Tribute to Jawbox (2004)

== Appearances in media ==
=== Television ===
- Selections from The Scene's Out of Sight appeared on Road Rules on MTV ca. 2001–2002
- Selections from The Scene's Out of Sight appeared on The Real World ca. 2001–2002
- "Tad Loves Kimberly James," "The Scene's Out of Sight' and "Joan of Arc" appeared in NBC's All About Us in 2001
- "Joan of Arc" featured in the Australian program Out There
- "Joan of Arc" featured on Fuel TV
- "The Scene is Out of Sight" was used as background music in an Adidas commercial that aired during the X Games in 2004
- "All You'll Ever Need To Know" featured in Queer Eye for the Straight Guy episode #133 ("Michael Zurrich")
- "My Favorite Man" featured on Roswell DVD release
- Selections from Full Upright Position featured on MTV's Real World/Road Rules Challenge
- "Moneypenny's Theme" featured on The Real World
- "Shining Jewels," "Simple Life," and "Cut Above" featured in ABC's Men In Trees 2007–2008 season
- "Joan of Arc" appeared in the pilot episode of CBS's The Ex-List, October 3, 2008
- "We Are Not the Losers (Anymore)" appeared the "Double Down" episode of ABC's Castle, 2009

=== Film ===
- "Joan of Arc" played in the background of a night club scene in Personal Velocity

=== Video games ===
- "I Hope This Makes It Easier For You" and "The Scene's Out of Sight" appeared in Amped 2 for Xbox
- "33 1/3" appeared in NHL Rivals 2004 for Xbox
- It is unclear whether popular Dota 2 personality Jake "SirActionSlacks" Kanner chose his stage name due to an interest in the band.

=== Other ===
- "Shining Jewels" was used in a promotional DVD for the Los Angeles Galaxy professional soccer team
- "Simple Life" was featured in an interactive car radio section of Honda's CR-V Web site in 2007
- "If I'm Not Deceived" was used in an American Eagle Outfitters commercial/vignette on MTV in 2007
