= Law of fives =

Law of fives or Law of Fives may refer to:

- An idea in The Illuminatus! novel trilogy and in Discordianism
- Law of Fives, a song in the album Think: Peace
- Law of Fives, an album by Chandeliers.

== See also ==
- Wuxing (Chinese philosophy), "Law of Five Elements", in Taoism and various Asian philosophies
