= Fred Armisen =

American comedian and actor (born 1966)

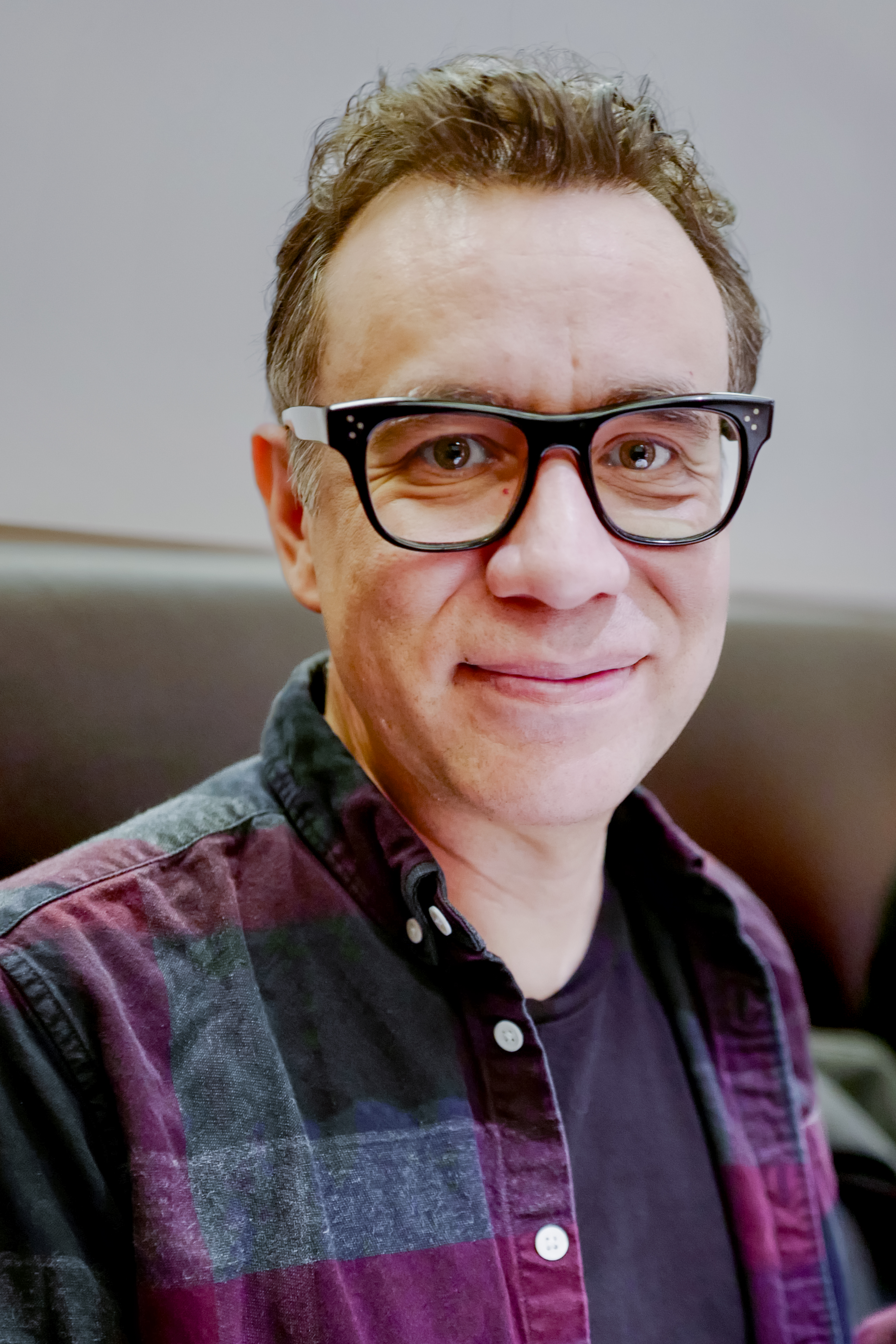
- Armisen in 2022
- Born: Fereydun Robert Armisen; December 4, 1966 (age 59); Hattiesburg, Mississippi, U.S.
- Occupations: Comedian; actor; musician; television writer
- Years active: 1984–present
- Spouses: Sally Timms (m. 1998; div. 2004) Elisabeth Moss (m. 2009; div. 2011) Riki Lindhome (m. 2022)
- Musical career
- Genres: Punk rock; indie rock; art rock; musical comedy
- Instruments: Vocals; drums; guitar
- Labels: Skene!; East West; Drag City
- Website: fredarmisen.com

Fereydun Robert "Fred" Armisen (born December 4, 1966) is an American comedian, actor, musician, and television writer. With his comedy partner Carrie Brownstein, he co-created and co-starred in the IFC sketch comedy series Portlandia. He also co-created and starred in the mockumentary IFC series Documentary Now! and the Showtime comedy series Moonbase 8.

Armisen was the bandleader and frequent drummer for the Late Night with Seth Meyers house band, the 8G Band, from 2014 to 2024. He was a cast member on the late-night sketch comedy and variety series Saturday Night Live (SNL) from 2002 to 2013. He voiced Speedy Gonzales on The Looney Tunes Show (2011–2013). He also works as a voice actor in films, such as The Smurfs (2011), The Smurfs 2 (2013), The House of Tomorrow, The Lego Ninjago Movie (both 2017), The Mitchells vs. the Machines (2021), The Super Mario Bros. Movie, The Contestant (both 2023), Thelma the Unicorn (2024) and Fixed (2025).

Armisen has acted in comedy films, including Melvin Goes to Dinner (2003), EuroTrip (2004), The Ex (2006), and The Dictator (2012). He is also notable for his guest-star appearances in television shows such as 30 Rock, Parks and Recreation, Brooklyn Nine-Nine, New Girl, Broad City, Unbreakable Kimmy Schmidt, Difficult People, The Last Man on Earth, Toast of Tinseltown, Our Flag Means Death, Curb Your Enthusiasm, Modern Family, and Barry.

Armisen received a Grammy Award nomination for Best Comedy Album for Standup for Drummers in 2019. He has also won two Peabody Awards, one in 2008 as part of the Saturday Night Live political satire cast and one in 2011 for Portlandia. From 2019 to 2022, he co-starred and served as writer and executive producer on the Spanish-language series Los Espookys, which he co-created.

== Early life ==
Fereydun Robert Armisen was born in Hattiesburg, Mississippi, on December 4, 1966, the son of schoolteacher Hildegardt Mirabal Level and IBM employee Fereydun Herbert Armisen. He moved with his family to New York as a baby, and briefly lived in Brazil in his youth. He was raised in Valley Stream, New York, where he was a classmate of fellow SNL alumnus Jim Breuer. He attended the School of Visual Arts in Manhattan before dropping out to begin a career as a rock drummer. He said that he was inspired to perform after seeing the Clash and Devo perform on television, and wanted to be a performer since he was a child.

Armisen's mother was Venezuelan, born in San Fernando de Apure, while his father was born in Soltau, Germany, to a German mother and Korean father. Armisen's paternal grandmother briefly dated an Iranian man after becoming pregnant with his father and gave his father a Persian given name, Fereydun, though he had no Persian heritage himself. Armisen was then named after his father. For much of his life, Armisen thought his paternal grandfather Masami Ehara (Japanese: 江原正美, Hepburn: Ehara Masami, better known professionally as Masami Kuni) was Japanese. However, Ehara was actually Korean and came from Ulsan; he was born Pak Yŏng-in (Korean: 박영인, RR: Bak Yeongin, MR: Pak Yŏngin) and adopted a Japanese name and persona after the massacre of Koreans in 1923 when he was a high school student. Pak studied aesthetics at Tokyo Imperial University and became a professional dancer before moving to Nazi Germany, where he was part of Goebbels's cultural propaganda machine while also spying for Japan. After the war, he returned to Japan, and formed a premier modern dance company. He eventually immigrated to the US, where he taught dance at what is now Cal State Fullerton from 1964 to 1975. Pak Yŏng-in's family were members of the Korean aristocracy, and his Korean lineage can be verifiably traced back to the 1600s.

== Career ==
=== Music ===
In 1984, Armisen played drums in a local band along with his high school friends in Valley Stream, New York, but the group soon ended. In 1988, he moved to Chicago to play drums for the punk rock band Trenchmouth, and in the 1990s he played background drums with Blue Man Group.

Armisen played drums on three tracks for Les Savy Fav's 2007 album Let's Stay Friends, as well as tracks for Matthew Sweet's 2011 album Modern Art and Wandering Lucy's 1996 album Leap Year.

Armisen has served as the music director and frequent drummer of the 8G Band, the house band for Late Night with Seth Meyers, since February 24, 2014. The band was laid off at the end of the 2023–2024 season due to budget cuts from NBC.

In 2018, Armisen played drums as part of Devo at John Waters' Burger Boogaloo festival in Oakland, California.

In July 2021, he performed at the Newport Folk Festival in Rhode Island.

In September 2025, Armisen released an album of sound effects titled 100 Sound Effects on the independent record label Drag City. The album features contributions from Mary Lynn Rajskub, Amber Coffman, Tim Heidecker, and Riki Lindhome. Armisen dedicated the album to the late Steve Albini.

=== Television and film ===
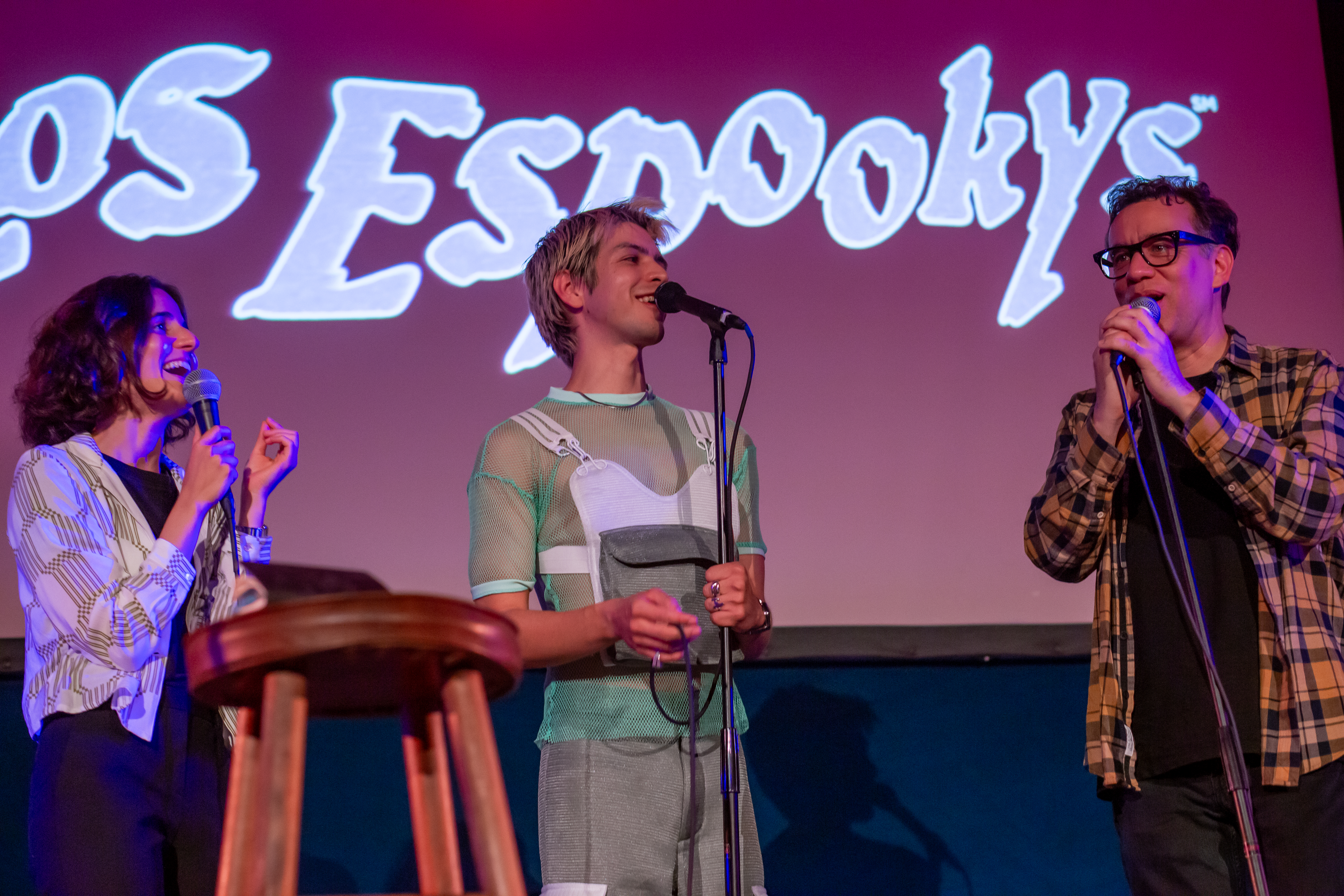
Ana Fabrega, Julio Torres and Armisen in "Los Espooky's live" in 2019

While not playing with the band Trenchmouth, Armisen's interests switched to acting. In a January 2006 interview, he said, "I wanted to be on TV somehow. For some reason, I always thought it would be an indirect route; I didn't know that it would be comedy and Saturday Night Live. I just wanted to do something with performing that would lead me there."

Armisen's subsequent television work, such as some "memorable Andy Kaufman–esque appearances" on Late Night with Conan O'Brien, as well as work for Crank Yankers and Adult Swim, led to a role in 2002 as a featured player in the cast of Saturday Night Live. In the 2004 season, he was promoted to repertory cast member.

Armisen has landed several minor yet memorable roles that were defined by an interviewer as "feral foreigners" in comedy films such as Eurotrip, Deuce Bigalow: European Gigolo, Anchorman: The Legend of Ron Burgundy, Deck the Halls, The Ex, The Promotion, The Rocker, Tenacious D in The Pick of Destiny, and Confessions of a Shopaholic.

Further television work included an appearance on Parks and Recreation in the 2009 episode "Sister City". For the Cartoon Network series The Looney Tunes Show (2011–2014), Armisen voices Speedy Gonzales. He and fellow Saturday Night Live alums Bill Hader and Seth Meyers write, produce, and star in the IFC mockumentary series Documentary Now! which premiered in 2015.

Armisen starred in the IFC sketch series Portlandia alongside Carrie Brownstein (of Sleater-Kinney); the first season debuted on January 21, 2011. With Brownstein, he appeared on the 2012 Simpsons episode "The Day the Earth Stood Cool", in which they play the Simpsons' new neighbors, who encourage everyone to be cool like them.

For his work on Portlandia, Armisen was nominated for an Emmy Award for Outstanding Writing for a Variety Series in 2012, 2013, and 2014 and for Outstanding Supporting Actor in a Comedy Series in 2014.

From 2018 to 2021, Armisen voiced the character of KVN on the animated television series Final Space.

In 2021, Armisen was executive producer on the documentary Charm Circle, directed by Nira Burstein. In 2022, he appeared in Wednesday as Uncle Fester. In the same year, he appeared in the first season of Our Flag Means Death as Geraldo, a barkeep in the Republic of Pirates and one of Spanish Jackie's husbands. Spanish Jackie was played by Leslie Jones.

In 2024, Armisen appeared as FDA representative Mike Puntz in Jerry Seinfeld's Unfrosted.

=== Saturday Night Live ===
Armisen joined the cast of Saturday Night Live in 2002. He was promoted to a repertory player in 2004. After 11 years as a cast member, he decided to leave the show. At the time of his 2013 departure from the show, Armisen was the third-longest-tenured cast member (behind Seth Meyers and Darrell Hammond), and he appeared in the second-highest number of sketches (856) of any cast member. Since then, Armisen has come back for multiple cameo appearances on the show, including when he hosted the season 41 finale on May 21, 2016, with musical guest Courtney Barnett.

The following is a partial list of notable roles Armisen has played in Saturday Night Live sketches.

==== Recurring characters ====
- Billy Smith – a Native American stand-up comedian who tells Native American–themed jokes that no one understands.
- Fericito – a Venezuelan nightclub comedian who has his own TV show, Show Biz Grande Explosion with sidekick Manuel (Horatio Sanz).
- Gunther Kelly – a student at George Washington University who performs songs on Weekend Update with his brother Patrick (played by Will Forte).
- Leonard – the strange European host of the foreign music show Club Traxx.
- Mackey – a senile drummer who often does rimshots at inappropriate moments and appears in the "Rialto Grande" sketches.
- Nooni Schoener – a quirky, foreign art dealer who appears with his wife Nuni Schoener (played by Maya Rudolph) in "the Schoeners" sketches.
- Frondi – a mentally challenged character who criticizes Ben Affleck's movie Gigli to Ben himself.
- Manuel Ortiz – host of The Manuel Ortiz show on Television Dominicana where he "helps with whatever it is" his audience members are going through.
- Nicholas Fehn – a political commentator whose mind wanders so much that he is incapable of finishing a sentence without starting a new one.
- Roger A. Trevanti – a greedy studio head and AMPTP member who rails against the 2007–08 Writers Guild of America strike. The character's only SNL appearance was on the last episode of season 33, before the show went on hiatus for the WGA strike, but he appeared in several Internet videos around the same time.
- Rodger Brush – a producer of multiple Dr. Phil–type talk shows, each focused on a different topic (teen, marital, sexual, and pregnancy issues), who fills in when the hosts are sick. He repeatedly tells guests relating their problems to speak up, and, unable to relate to their problems, offers them either useless advice based on his experience or no help at all.
- Garth – part of Garth & Kat (with Kristen Wiig), a musical duo who appear on Weekend Update unprepared and make up songs on the spot.
- Giuseppe – the saxophone player for What Up with That?
- Stuart – homeowner from The Californians, a soap opera parody featuring Armisen, Bill Hader, Kristen Wiig and others as wealthy blondes with Valley girl accents.
- One of the "Dictator's Two Best Friends from Growing Up" (with Vanessa Bayer) who come to Weekend Update to secretly trash-talk the various dictators (such as Muammar al-Gaddafi and Kim Jong-un) with whom they grew up.
- Regine – a pretentious and condescending woman who exhibits blatant euphoric and erotic facial expressions when touched on certain parts of her body.
- Ian Rubbish – A late-1970s/early-80s British punk rocker, a parody of Sex Pistols' John Lydon, who caught heat from his bandmates Derek Gash (played by Bill Hader) and Keith Grimshaw (played by Taran Killam) and fans for writing and performing songs supporting Conservative Prime Minister Margaret Thatcher.

==== Celebrity impressions ====
Armisen's list of notable impressions has included:

- Barack Obama – recurring in Season 33 and Season 34 episodes as the Democratic presidential candidate (Season 33), the Democratic nominee, President-elect, and President (Season 34), beginning on February 23, 2008. As of season 38, Jay Pharoah replaced Armisen as Obama.
- Prince – parody of the musician as the host of a talk show called The Prince Show, with Beyoncé Knowles (played by Maya Rudolph) as his co-host. Armisen, a fan of Prince since childhood, created the sketch as a way of improving his chances of meeting the musician.
- Steve Jobs – Apple CEO who appears on Weekend Update to show off strange new technology. Armisen has stated that Steve Jobs is the celebrity he most enjoys portraying.
- Ira Glass – After seeing an unused SNL sketch, Glass invited Armisen to co-host a This American Life episode about doppelgängers.
- David Paterson – Governor of New York.
- Queen Elizabeth II – There were four sketches between 2010 and 2012 where he played the Queen of the United Kingdom.
- Michael Bloomberg – numerous sketches between 2011 and present, including recurrent segments during the 2020 Democratic Primaries.

=== Other work ===
In 1998, he posed as a music journalist for the short film Fred Armisen's Guide to Music and South by Southwest. It was filmed by then-girlfriend Sally Timms and featured Armisen's "pranking musicians and industry types" during the South by Southwest festival in Austin, Texas. In various segments he asked self-described "stupid" questions, pretended to be German, and also acted blind. A year later, Armisen starred with alternative rock legend Steve Albini in Chevelle's Point No. 1 EPK.

Armisen is part of ThunderAnt, a comedy duo with Sleater-Kinney guitarist Carrie Brownstein. The duo specializes in creating comedic short skits often about independent vocations such as one-man shows, feminist bookstores, and bicycle rights activists. Armisen founded ThunderAnt.com, a website that features the comedy sketches created with Brownstein.

Armisen has directed music videos for bands such as the Helio Sequence. Armisen also had a role in the Wilco documentary I Am Trying to Break Your Heart, which featured footage from his stint opening for front man Jeff Tweedy's 2001 solo tour. He also appeared in video segments on Blue Man Group's How to be a Megastar Tour 2.0. Armisen occasionally writes for Pitchfork Media and interviewed Cat Power for that company. He appeared as Jens Hannemann on Jimmy Kimmel Live! on October 19, 2007, promoting a 28-minute DVD called Fred Armisen presents Jens Hannemann: "COMPLICATED DRUMMING TECHNIQUE". In 2010, Armisen briefly joined Joanna Newsom's tour for her album Have One on Me as his character Jens Hannemann. On SNL, Armisen often plays musical instruments in sketches, has two recurring characters who are musicians (Mackey the drummer from the Rialto Grande and Ferecito from Showbiz Grande Explosion), or impersonates famous figures in the music world such as Liberace, Phil Spector, Lou Reed, and Prince.

Armisen appeared in the official music video for Man Man's song "Rabbit Habits", playing a man who charms his blind date (Charlyne Yi) but runs away after she turns into a werewolf.

In 2013, Armisen appeared in the official music video for Portland, Oregon-based band Red Fang's song "Blood Like Cream". In 2021, he appeared as the protagonist in the official music video for the 2020 mix of George Harrison's song "My Sweet Lord".

Along with Bill Hader and Jason Sudeikis, Armisen voiced radio characters in the video game Grand Theft Auto IV. Armisen would also continue to appear in other titles from Rockstar Games, such as a pharmacist in Red Dead Redemption, Grand Theft Auto V as a judge on an in-game reality TV show, strongly parodying Simon Cowell, and Red Dead Redemption 2 as a host at an in-game theatre you can attend.

Armisen performed as a singer/drummer/comedic actor in the Blue Man Group's "How to be a Megastar Live!". He played the part of a salesman on TV who advertises for the Megastar Rock Manual. He also drummed in the performance and was a backup singer.

In late 2014, Armisen was featured on the popular comedy web series Comedians in Cars Getting Coffee with host Jerry Seinfeld.

Armisen is a longtime fan of punk rock music and can be seen in the documentaries Salad Days and The Damned: Don't You Wish That We Were Dead.

In 2015, Armisen was the recipient of Smithsonian magazine's American Ingenuity Award for Performing Arts.

In 2018, Armisen provided the foreword to The Yacht Rock Book by author Greg Prato.

Armisen appears as Michael on the sixth episode of the revival of The Kids in the Hall, released on May 13, 2022.

In 2024, Armisen made a cameo as DJ Carl in Fallout, living in a shack surrounded by bespoke traps and playing colonial-era violin music, a reference to the oft-hated Classical Radio station from Fallout 4.

== Personal life ==
Armisen was married to English singer Sally Timms of the Mekons from 1998 to 2004, and American actress Elisabeth Moss from 2009 to 2011. In 2014, Moss described their time together as "extremely traumatic, awful and horrible". "One of the greatest things I heard someone say about him is, 'He's so great at doing impersonations. But the greatest impersonation he does is that of a normal person,'" Moss added. During a later interview with Howard Stern, Armisen said, "I think I was a terrible husband. I think I'm a terrible boyfriend. [...] I feel bad for everyone I've gone out with."

Since working together on ThunderAnt, Armisen and Carrie Brownstein developed what Brownstein has called "one of the most intimate, functional, romantic, but nonsexual relationships [they have] ever had". According to Armisen, their relationship is "all of the things that I've ever wanted, you know, aside from like the physical stuff, but the intimacy that I have with her is like no other".

From 2010 to 2011, Armisen dated fellow Saturday Night Live cast member Abby Elliott. He started dating actress Natasha Lyonne in 2014. Lyonne confirmed that they had ended their relationship in April 2022: "We love each other just about as much as two people can love each other and we're still talking all the time." Armisen began dating and married actress, comedian and musician Riki Lindhome later that year, and they purchased a home together in Los Feliz.

Armisen is a fan of the Red Dead video game franchise, and voiced characters in Red Dead Redemption (2010) and Red Dead Redemption 2 (2018). He is also a fan of black metal and death metal and has mentioned bands such as Immortal, Beherit, Liturgy, Myrkur, Absu, Xasthur, Sumac, Deafheaven and Abysmal Dawn to be some of his personal favorites.

Armisen is an atheist.

== Discography ==
As a member of Trenchmouth:

- Snakebite (EP, 1989)
- Kick Your Mind And Make It Move (EP, 1991)
- Construction of New Action (1991)
- Trenchmouth / Circus Lupus (split, 1992)
- Inside the Future (1993)
- The Position of the Right Hand: Trenchmouth / Bliss (split, 1993)
- Achtung Chicago! Zwei (compilation, 1993)
- Trenchmouth vs. The Light of the Sun (1994)
- The Broadcasting System (1995)
- Volumes, Amplifiers, Equalizers (1995)
- More Motion: A Collection (2003)

As a member of Crisis of Conformity:

- "Fist Fight!" (single, 2010)

As a member of the Blue Jean Committee:

- Catalina Breeze (EP, 2015)

As a comedian:

- Standup for Drummers (standup comedy album, 2018)

Singles & EPs:

- Portlandia with Carrie Brownstein (2011)
- KFC Nashville Hot Record (2016)
- Parade Meeting (Org Music, 2021) (Record Store Day release)
- 100 Sound Effects (2025)

== Awards and nominations ==
Media offices
Preceded by Questlove	Late Night bandleader February 24, 2014–present	Succeeded by Incumbent
