= Trenchmouth =

American rock band

- Trenchmouth, from left to right: Armisen, Locks, DeZutter, Montana

Background information
- Origin: Chicago, Illinois, U.S.
- Genres: Post-hardcore; punk rock; math rock; dub
- Years active: 1988–1996
- Label: Skene!/East West
- Past members: Damon Locks; Chris DeZutter; Wayne Montana; Fred Armisen; Chris Cupzack; Josh Kohn; Tom Sweets

Trenchmouth was an American punk band from Chicago, Illinois, formed in 1988. Throughout its existence, the band mainly consisted of Damon Locks (vocals/percussion), Chris DeZutter (guitar), Wayne Montana (bass), and Fred Armisen (drums).

== Biography ==
The band was founded in 1988 after Locks and Armisen dropped out of the School of Visual Arts and moved from New York to Chicago. As a five-piece with two guitarists, the band released their debut EP, Snakebite, in 1989. After releasing two studio albums, Construction of New Action and Inside The Future, they released a third LP, Trenchmouth vs. The Light of the Sun, on East West Records, a division of Elektra Records. The band broke up after releasing their final album, The Broadcasting System, in 1996.

Armisen went on to be a cast member of Saturday Night Live, and would later create, produce, and star in the TV sketch comedy series Portlandia. Locks went on to be in Super ESP and later reconvened with Montana to form The Eternals. Locks also collaborated with Rob Mazurek in Exploding Star Orchestra and, and founded Black Monument Ensemble in the late 2010s.

In a 2014 panel discussion with filmmaker Lance Bangs and musicians David Pajo and David Grubbs, Armisen revealed why he quit Trenchmouth: "It just felt like other bands kept passing us by." As the Village Voice reported on the discussion, "Armisen said it was easy to convince himself some of those bands were more pop, and had a broader appeal. But as weirder and weirder bands started passing Trenchmouth by, he started to see the writing on the wall." As Armisen himself concluded at the event: "Tortoise [Pajo's former band] had 20 minute songs with no vocals and they were huge."

== Musical style ==
Primarily known as a post-hardcore band, Trenchmouth was also labeled as punk rock and math rock. The band's musical style featured influences from various genres, including no wave, post-punk, funk, and reggae, as well as Latin music. The band's first single, "Snakebite", was described as a post-punk track that "fills in the void between primitive acid-jazz grooves, worldbeat brazenness, and fetid Fugazi formula." While the band's following releases, including Trenchmouth Vs. the Light of the Sun, featured "mutating time signatures, elaborate guitar phrasing, and fast-walking basslines that traditionally signify 1970s prog-rock", the band's final album completes the band's evolution to a "bass-heavy dub project".

== Discography ==
Studio albums

- Construction of New Action (Skene! Records, 1991)
- Inside The Future (Skene!, 1993)
- Trenchmouth Vs. the Light of the Sun (Skene!/EastWest, 1994)
- Volumes, Amplifiers, Equalizers (Runt, 1994)
- The Broadcasting System (Skene!, 1996)

EPs

- Kick Your Mind and Make It Move EP (Dead Bird, 1991)

Compilation appearances

- Achtung Chicago! Zwei compilation (Underdog Records, 1993)
- More Motion: A Collection (Thick Records, 2003)

Singles

- "Snakebite" (1989)
