= Skene! Records =

Independent record label

- Logo in use starting in 1990.
- Founded: 1988; 38 years ago
- Founder: Jeff Spiegel
- Defunct: 1997
- Status: Defunct
- Genre: Hardcore Punk; Pop Punk
- Country of origin: United States
- Location: St. Paul, Minnesota

Skene! Records was an American DIY punk rock record label founded in Connecticut in 1988 by Jeff Spiegel, then later based in Minneapolis, Minnesota. An early album release was Better Yet Connecticut Hardcore, featuring bands such as Bug Gulp, Fallback, Freedom of Choice, Forced Reality and Scooter X.

Spiegel also promoted local punk shows in central Connecticut. The most infamous of which being "the greatest show that never happened", showcased at the New Britain VFW hall and featuring bands such as Big Gulp, Freedom of Choice, and Fallback. Shortly after the show began, during Fallback's set, a fight broke out and the show was forcibly shut down by the New Britain Police department; some of the footage was caught on a video tape that seems to have been lost.

The label later released records from such bands as Green Day, (Note: Specifically, Sweet Children.) Trenchmouth, Shades Apart, AWAKE!, The People's Court, Slap of Reality, Candy Machine, Bob Evans (not to be confused with the solo artist), Lifter Puller, Actionslacks, Everready, Fuel (not to be confused with the popular rock band), Angry Son, Go!, Phleg Camp, Jawbreaker, Crimpshrine, Dog Tired, The Deviators, Gneissmaker, Walt Mink, and others, and was considered a contemporary of No Idea Records, Very Small Records, and Lookout! Records.

The label existed at least until 1996, and is mentioned by Matt Diehl in My So-Called Punk (St Martin's Press, 2007) in terms of the relation between punk with a DIY ethic and contemporary "neo-punk" involved in the Warped Tour and large punk labels such as Epitaph Records.

== Catalog ==
- Various, "Better Yet... Connecticut Hardcore", 1988 (7" Comp, split label with NoHelp Records)
- Fallback, "Connecticut Hardcore", 1988 (Cass, demo, 8 songs)
- Various, "Caution", 1988 (7" Comp)
- Awake!, "Beliefs", 1989 (45, split label with TPOS & Victory Records)
- Various, "Chop Chop", 1989 (7" Comp)
- Beef Trust, "Beef Trust", 1989 (7", 3 songs)
- Walt Mink / Gneissmäker, "Walt Mink / Gneissmäker", 1990 (45)
- Dog Tired, "A Bone To Pick With The World", 1989 (7" EP, 4 songs)
- Sticks And Stones, "Storm Coming", 1990 (7" EP, 4 songs)
- Thepeoplescourt, "Thepeoplescourt", 1990 (7" EP, 5 songs)
- Green Day, "Sweet Children", 1990 (7" EP, 4 songs)
- Go! / Bad Trip, "Pay to Go! / Number Eleven Tour Two", 1990 (7" EP, 14 songs)
- Fuel / Angry Son, "Fuel / Angry Son", 1991 (7" EP, 3 songs)
- Hgual, "Riding On Three Wheels", 1990 (CD, 10 songs)
- Various, "Can You Break Through?", 1990 (LP, 14 songs)
- Anger Means, "Not Human Anymore", 1991 (7" EP, 6 songs)
- Bob Evans, "Adult World", 1991 (CD, 10 songs)
- Sticks And Stones, "Coupe Flowers Can't Fail", 1990 (7" EP, 5 songs)
- The Deviators, "Century 21", 1990 (7")
- Lucky, "The Truth / Iron Lung", 1991 (45)
- Trenchmouth, "Construction of a New Action, Volume One: First There Was Movement", 1991 (CD, 11 songs)
- Bob Evans, "Drought", 1992 (CD, 5 songs)
- Trenchmouth / Circus Lupus, "Sea Of Serenity / Heathen", 1992 (Picture Disc, split label with Dischord Records)
- Candy Machine, "Body Of Armistice / Steppers", 1992 (7")
- Sticks And Stones, "Theme Song for Nothing", 1993 (CD, 12 songs)
- Candy Machine, "Candy Machine", 1993 (CD, 12 songs, Cass, 11 songs)
- Jawbreaker / Crimpshrine, "Better Half / Sanctuary", 1993 (7")
- Shades Apart, "Neon", 1993 (CD, 9 songs)
- Alloy / Bob Evans, "Razorwire / Lawyer", 1994 (45)
- Hard-Ons, "Too Far Gone", 1993 (CD, 15 songs)
- Trenchmouth, "Inside The Future", 1993 (CD, 12 songs)
- Bob Evans, "Jersey Barrier", 1993 (CD, 12 songs)
- Gneissmaker, "Forty Acre Fugue", 1993 (CD, 8 songs)
- Candy Machine, "A Modest Proposal", 1994 (CD, 16 songs)
- Trenchmouth, "Trenchmouth vs. The Light of the Sun", 1994 (CD, 10 songs)
- Bob Evans, "The Bradley Suite", 1995 (CD, 11 songs)
- Lifter Puller, "Slips Backwards / Nassau Coliseum", 1995 (7")
- Slap Of Reality, "Drowned Out", 1995 (7", 3 songs)
- Everready, "Girl", 1995 (7")
- Latch Key Kids, "Time Out", 1995 (7", 4 songs)
- Trenchmouth, "The Broadcasting System", 1996 (CD, 9 songs)
- Actionslacks, "Too Bright, Just Right, Good Night", 1996 (CD, 16 songs)
- Bob Evans, "Leechfield Garden", 1995 (CD, 16 songs)
- Lifter Puller, "Lifter Puller", 1997 (CD, 13 songs)
- Calvin Krime, "Kids Incarcerated", 1996 (45, 3 songs)
