= Chandeliers (band) =

American electronic music ensemble

- Origin: Chicago, Illinois, United States
- Genres: Electronic, Experimental, Avant-Garde, Art Rock
- Years active: 2005–2020
- Labels: Pickled Egg Records; Obey Your Brain; Captcha Records; Potions Music NYC; Ghost Arcade, LTD
- Members: Chris Kalis; Scott McGaughey; Lisa Armstrong
- Past members: Dan Jugle; Harry Brenner; Travis Murphy; Dan Quinlivan; Cameron Brand; Brett Sova; Jeremiah Chiu

Chandeliers were an electronic ensemble from Chicago, Illinois. The group was formed in 2005 by Chris Kalis, Dan Jugle, Scott McGaughey, Dan Quinlivan and Harry Brenner and was primarily based out of the Shape Shoppe recording studio/loft in Chicago. The group's recordings and live performances cover an array of different musical styles and their sound has been likened to musicians such as Kraftwerk, Can, Chris Carter, Giorgio Moroder. Chandeliers have released four albums: The Thrush (2008), Dirty Moves (2009), Roulé (2011), and Founding Fathers (2012). The group has toured nationally and has performed live musical scores to Wallace Berman's Aleph, Emlen Etting's Oramunde, The Junky's Christmas animated short, and Marcell Jankovics' Son of the White Mare.

== Discography ==
=== Albums ===
- 2008 – The Thrush (Pickled Egg Records/ Obey Your Brain ) – CD / LP
- 2009 – Dirty Moves (Pickled Egg Records / Captcha Records) – CD / LP
- 2011 – Roulé (split with Mahjongg (band)) (Captcha Records) – LP
- 2012 – Founding Fathers (Captcha Records) – LP
- 2017 – Law of Fives (Potions Music) – Cassette / digital

=== EPs and singles ===
- 2006 – Circulation EP (Ghost Arcade, LTD) – 7" vinyl
- 2013 – Unheard Intensities b/w Time Drive – (Notes and Bolts Records) – 7" vinyl
- 2013 – Lemur – (Notes and Bolts Records) – limited edition lathe cut vinyl
- 2017 – Cruisin' (split with Songs for Gods) – (Potions Music) – 7" vinyl / digital
- 2018 – High Diamond b/w Snake Bomb' – (Potions Music) – 7" vinyl / digital

=== Remixes ===
- 2012 – Sinkane Runnin (Phonica Records Special Editions) – 12" vinyl
- 2016 – TRUE Colors of My Estimation (Mouthwatering Records)

=== Film Scores ===
- 2017 – Orders (dir. Eric Marsh & Andrew Stasiulis)

=== Compilations ===
- 2011 – Below The Radar06 - The WIRE Magazine ("Candy Apple")
- 2014 - Twosyllable Records Chicago Cassette Compilcation, vol 2 ("Its Own Small Breathing")
