= Alabaster DePlume =

English musician and activist

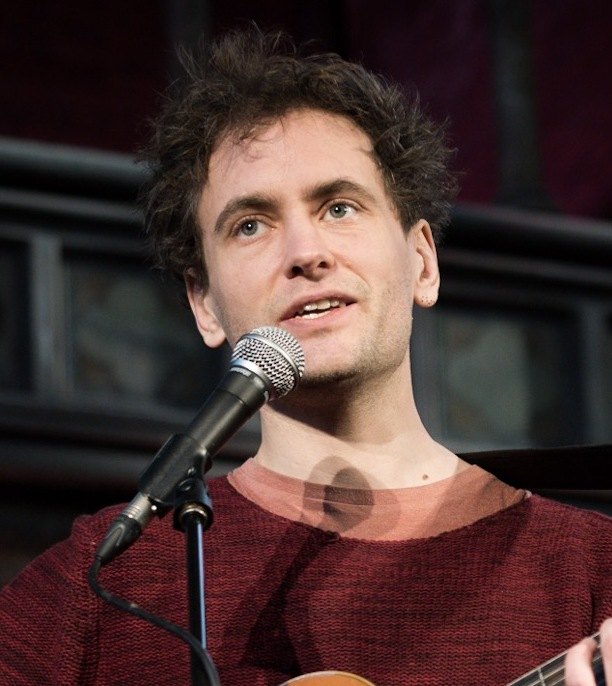
- DePlume in 2017

Background information
- Born: Angus Fairbairn; 1980 or 1981 (age 45–46)
- Origin: Manchester, England
- Genres: Jazz; spoken word
- Labels: International Anthem; Total Refreshment; Debt; Lost Map

Angus Fairbairn, known professionally as Alabaster DePlume, is an English saxophonist, spoken word poet, composer, and activist.

== Early life ==
Fairbairn was either born in 1980 or in 1981, in Manchester, England. He started out making "jagged, noisy music" with his brothers, before learning to play the saxophone in 2007. During his early 20s, he started a jam night with some friends in South Manchester, and adopted his stage name based on a "rude tirade" from a passing car yelling something that sounded like "Alabaster DePlume". In 2015, he moved to London – in his words in order to "become a new person" – and started working as a teaching assistant in Eltham.

== Musical career ==
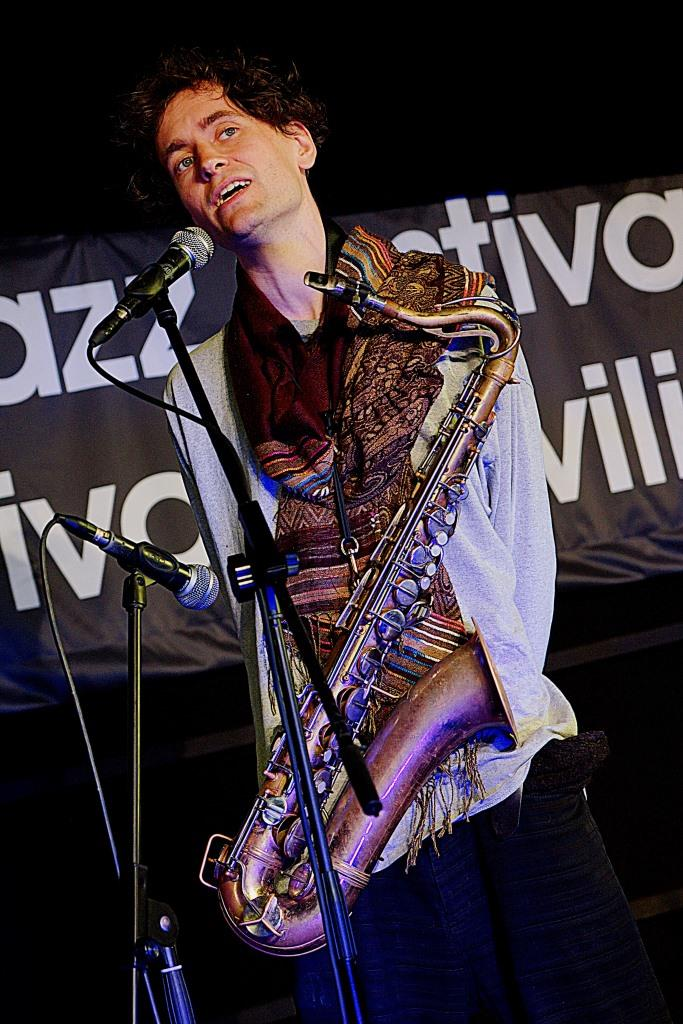
DePlume performing at the Manchester Jazz Festival in 2016

While in London, Fairbairn started working at the Total Refreshment Centre, a Hackney-based recording studio, creative hub, and musical performance venue. At the Total Refreshment Centre, he would stage monthly improvisational gigs with different musicians under the name Peach, which involved jazz music and spoken word poetry. In October 2015, he released his album Peach through Debt Records.

In February 2020, Fairbairn released the instrumental album To Cy & Lee: Instrumentals Vol. 1. The album was at the time his biggest commercial success, leading to a breakthrough in his career. Writing for The Guardian, Ammar Kalia described the album as "tentative, breathy sax melodies laid over downtempo, atmospheric chord voicings". Fairbairn said that the instrumental work was "easier to digest" than the "weird fucking poems" in his previous albums, responding to feedback he had received from some listeners to his earlier work. Cy and Lee, to whom the title of the album refers, are two musicians with learning disabilities that Fairbairn befriended and composed music with during his work with Manchester charity Ordinary Lifestyles.

In April 2022, Fairbairn released Gold – Go Forward in the Courage of Your Love, to critical acclaim. Fairbairn recorded the album over two weeks in the summer of 2020 at the Total Refreshment Centre. He invited a multitude of different musicians into the studio each day and intentionally did not give them enough time to rehearse, saying that he did not want them to "hide behind this piece of material or skill. They had to look up and respond to each other". In a review for Pitchfork, Marty Sartini Garner wrote that the album was a "balm of spoken word and spiritual jazz, both strangely uncomfortable and strangely comforting", rating the album 8.4/10 and giving the album Pitchfork's "Best New Music" certification. DePlume released the albums, Come with Fierce Grace and A Blade Because a Blade Is Whole, in 2023 and 2025.

== Personality and activism ==
Fairbairn has been noted for his eccentric personality. In an interview with The Quietus, Patrick Clarke wrote that Fairbairn's "habits and eccentricities might be a little irritating did he not feel like such a genuine and honest person"; Ammar Kalia described speaking with Fairbairn as "an exercise in disarming earnestness. He is stick-thin and effusively gestural. Each sentence is gently considered and peppered with mentions of 'love', 'encouragement' and 'empowerment'".

Fairbairn's music and poetry often comes backed with sociopolitical intent, sometimes directly in songs like "I Was Gonna Fight Fascism", and the music video for "What's Missing", featuring the final public speech of Marxist Chilean president Salvador Allende before his government was overthrown by Augusto Pinochet. Even for his instrumental work, Fairbairn's record label International Anthem said that "his commitment to the cause is [still] as palpable through the instrumentals", though Fairbairn was more reserved in his own description: "I'm going to say that I've got a lot more work to do on my politics, and about our way forwards in this work and this society. My work is not done by playing nice instrumentals, but it's not harmed by that either."

== Discography ==
=== Albums ===
List of studio albums, with release date and label shown
Title	Details
Peach	Released: 2 October 2015; Label: Debt Records
The Corner of a Sphere	Released: 4 May 2018; Label: Lost Map Records
To Cy & Lee: Instrumentals Vol. 1	Released: 28 February 2020; Label: International Anthem
I Was Not Sleeping (with Danalogue)	Released: 20 November 2020; Label: Total Refreshment Records
Gold – Go Forward in the Courage of Your Love	Released: 1 April 2022; Label: International Anthem
Come with Fierce Grace	Released: 8 September 2023; Label: International Anthem
A Blade Because a Blade Is Whole	Released: 7 March 2025; Label: International Anthem

=== Extended plays ===
List of EPs, with release date and label shown
Title	Details
Visit Croatia	Released: 20 July 2020; Label: International Anthem
