= Dos Santos: Anti-Beat Orquesta =

Dos Santos
- Origin: Chicago, US
- Genres: progressive
- Years active: 2013–
- Labels: International Anthem
- Website: Official Website on facebook

Dos Santos is a quintet based in Chicago. Their elasticity & consistency in live performance and their recorded output have garnered them wide attention as one of the city's most potent, impactful performers. Collectively raised through the pedagogy of American popular and traditional Latin music, their future-minded sound gestures forward into an idealized new progressive American music, as rooted in Chicago as it is communicable with the world.

== Biography ==
Dos Santos made their debut in May 2013. The group's five members have their own storied careers in a diversity of styles—from jazz, R&B/soul, traditional Mexican folk, punk, cumbia, salsa. Peter Margasak of the Chicago Reader writes, "It seems only a matter of time before the combo becomes a key player on the country’s world-music circuit." Colin Joyce of Noisey writes of their (2018) "mind-expanding" single Logos:

"The track's built around four minutes of droney organ grooves, fluttering hand percussion, and the reedy voice of singer Alex Chavez, who offers a desperate, almost existential plea to be recognized in the song's chanted chorus . . . The kicker is the horn section, borrowed from the Brooklyn afrobeat band Antibalas, who imbue the whole piece a slippery, ecstatic energy that the band so often evoke."

NPR's Alt.Latino referred to the band as one of prominent bands at SXSW 2015. And in February, 2016, Dos Santos was voted Chicago's Best Emerging Artist of 2015 by the Deli Magazine's Readers Poll.

== Discography ==
=== Singles and EPs ===
- Logos (2018)
- Summit Sessions (2017)
- ¡Cafeteando! (2016)
- Corre Caballo (2015)

=== Albums ===
- Dos Santos (2015)
- Fonografic (2016)
- Logos (2018)
- City of Mirrors (2021)

== Members ==
The following are members of Dos Santos:

- Alex Chavez : Vocals, Guitar, Keyboards
- Jaime Garza : Electric Bass
- Nathan Karagianis : Guitar, Vocals
- Daniel Villarreal-Carrillo : Drums
- Peter "Maestro" Vale : Congas, Bongos, Percussion
