= Ben LaMar Gay =

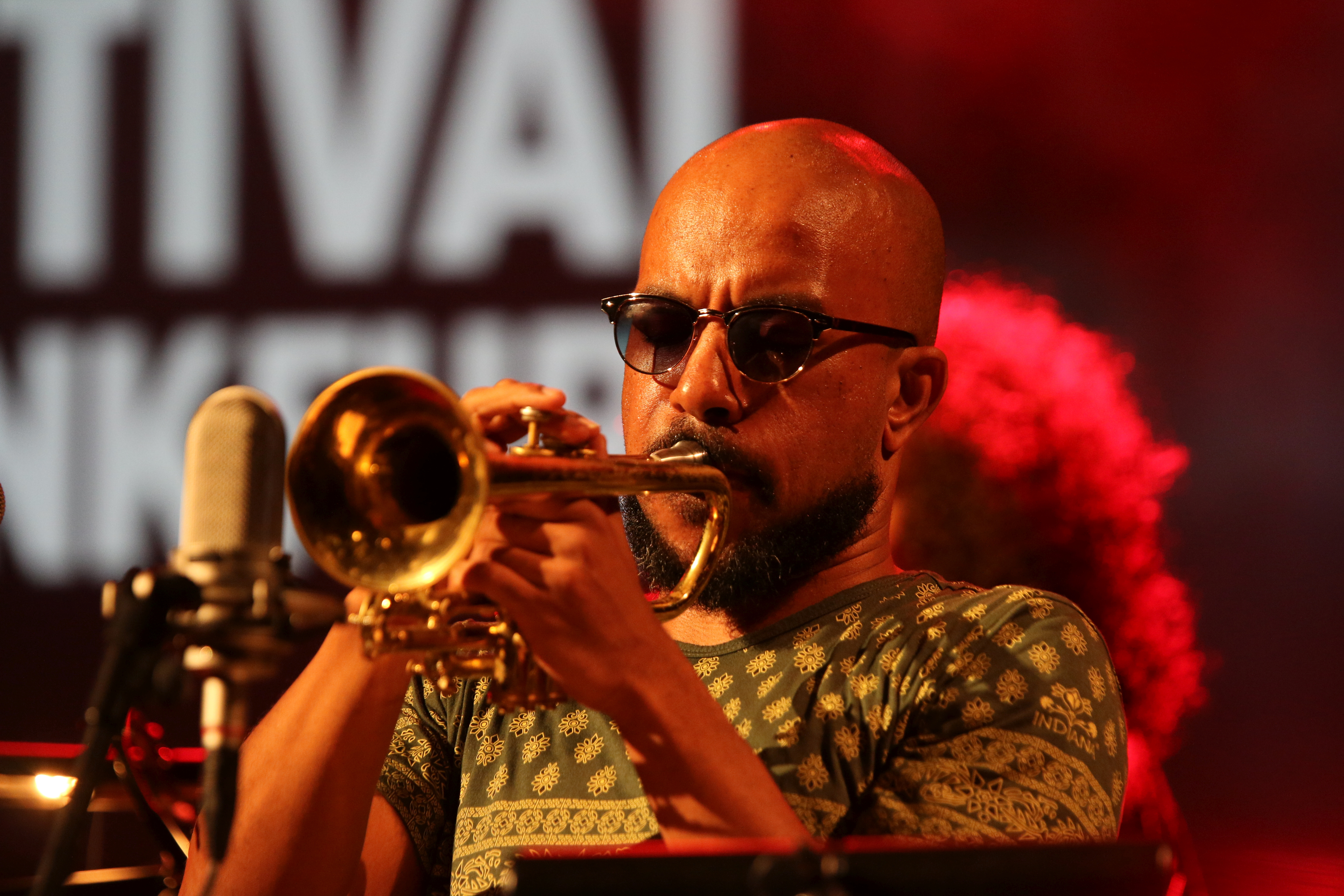
- Gay at Deutsches Jazzfestival in 2015

Background information
- Born: 1984 (age 41–42); Chicago, Illinois, US
- Genre: Jazz
- Occupations: Multi-instrumentalist; singer; composer
- Years active: 2010s–present
- Label: International Anthem
- Formerly of: Association for the Advancement of Creative Musicians

Ben LaMar Gay (born 1984) is an American multi-instrumentalist, singer, and composer. He released Downtown Castles Can Never Block the Sun (2018), Open Arms to Open Us (2021), and Yowzers (2025).

== Biography ==
Ben LaMar Gay was born in 1984 in Chicago, Illinois. He lived in Brazil for three years. He is a former member of the Association for the Advancement of Creative Musicians. The Washington Post has described him as "an integral figure in his local jazz community".

In 2018, Gay released his debut album, Downtown Castles Can Never Block the Sun. The album was recorded over the span of seven years. It contains material from his seven unreleased albums.

In 2019, Gay released Confetti in the Sky like Fireworks, a soundtrack to the short film This Is Bate Bola.

In 2021, Gay released his second full-length album, Open Arms to Open Us. It received universal acclaim from critics.

In 2022, Gay released Certain Reveries, a single long-form composition, in collaboration with percussionist Tommaso Moretti. He debuted the composition at a London Jazz Festival livestream show in 2020.

In 2025, Gay released his third full-length album, Yowzers. It contains performances by his quartet with Tommaso Moretti, Matthew Davis, and Will Faber.

== Discography ==
=== Studio albums ===
- Downtown Castles Can Never Block the Sun (International Anthem, 2018)
- Open Arms to Open Us (International Anthem, 2021)
- Yowzers (International Anthem, 2025)

=== Live albums ===
- Certain Reveries (International Anthem, 2022)

=== Soundtrack albums ===
- Confetti in the Sky like Fireworks (International Anthem, 2019)
