= Xhosa Cole =

British saxophonist

- Born: 1996 or 1997 (age 28–29); Birmingham, UK
- Years active: 2018–present
- Labels: Stoney Lane Records

Xhosa Cole is a British tenor saxophonist. He was the BBC Young Jazz Musician of the Year in 2018, and was named "Jazz Newcomer of the Year" at the Parliamentary Jazz Awards in 2019. Cole has released three albums on Stoney Lane Records.

== Biography ==
Xhosa Cole was born in the Handsworth area of Birmingham, UK. In 2018 he was named BBC Young Jazz Musician of the Year, and in 2019 he won "Jazz Newcomer of the Year" at the Parliamentary Jazz Awards.

Cole's debut album K(no)w Them, K(no)w Us, comprising seven songs from the Great American Songbook, was released on Stoney Lane Records in 2021. The Financial Times praised Cole's "maturity and strong vision" on the album. His second album Ibeji (Yoruba for "twins") was released in 2022, and features duets with seven percussionists from the African diaspora, including Lekan Babalola.

In 2025 Cole released his third album, On a Modern Genius Vol 1, an album of Thelonious Monk covers (and one Duke Ellington cover). All About Jazz called the album "a testament to the vitality of the young jazz scene."

== Discography ==
=== Albums ===
- K(no)w Them, K(no)w Us (2021, Stoney Lane)
- Ibeji (2022, Stoney Lane)
- On a Modern Genius Vol 1 (2025, Stoney Lane)
