= Weirdo (Emma-Jean Thackray album) =

Studio album by Emma-Jean Thackray
- Released: 25 April 2025
- Studios: Movementt (London); Stones Throw (Los Angeles); Yellow Shed (Seattle)
- Length: 57:41
- Labels: Brownswood; Parlophone
- Producer: Emma-Jean Thackray

Emma-Jean Thackray chronology
Yellow (2021)	Weirdo (2025)

Singles from Weirdo
- 1. "Wanna Die" Released: 28 January 2025

Weirdo is the second studio album by English jazz musician Emma-Jean Thackray. It was released on 25 April 2025 by Brownswood Recordings and Parlophone, in CD, LP and digital formats.

== Background ==
Released four years after Thackray's 2021 debut album, Yellow, Weirdo consists of nineteen songs with a total runtime of fifty-seven minutes and forty-one seconds. The album focuses on themes such as mental health, depression and grief, and incorporates elements of contemporary soul, rock, jazz, funk, and hip-hop. Thackray commenced the writing process for the album in 2022 and recorded it in her home studio in South London. She described the songs as "a grief diary" following the death of her partner in January 2023. The album was announced in January 2025, alongside the release of its first single, "Wanna Die", with a music video directed by Thackray and Nick Suchak. The album reached No 3 in the UK Jazz and Blues Album Chart in May 2025.

== Reception ==
Professional ratings
Aggregate scores
Source	Rating
Metacritic	85/100
Review scores
Source	Rating
AllMusic	4.5/5 stars
Clash	9/10
The Line of Best Fit	8/10
Mojo	4/5 stars
MusicOMH	4/5 stars
Pitchfork	7.8/10
Record Collector	3/5 stars
Tom Hull – on the Web	B
Uncut	8/10

John Murphy of MusicOMH referred to Weirdo as "an album born of grief that is unafraid to take risks and, in so doing, underlines a huge talent," rating it four out of five. The Line of Best Fit assigned the album a rating of eight out of ten and described it as "a total triumph" that "presents a potentially overwhelming spread of sound" and is "musically eclectically inspired, thematically deep and profound." Clash noted, "one of Weirdo's most immediately obvious qualities is its collection of relentlessly light-on-its-feet and funky music," rating it nine out of ten. Andy Cowan of Mojo remarked, "these 19 diaristic tracks (their titles a sequence of red flags) temper spilled thoughts and raw emotion with lush musicality, jazz harmonies and singalong grooves," giving it a rating of four stars. The Guardian opined, "But for all its stark imagery and bleak themes, Weirdo is 'about wanting to live'."

== Accolades ==
On 10 September 2025, Weirdo was announced as one of 12 nominees for the 2025 Mercury Prize.

== Track listing ==
All tracks are written by Emma-Jean Thackray; "Black Hole" written with Reggie Watts and "It's Okay" written with Kassa Overall.

Weirdo track listing
No.	Title	Length
1.	"Something Wrong with Your Mind"	0:31
2.	"Weirdo"	4:39
3.	"Stay"	4:23
4.	"Let Me Sleep"	4:55
5.	"Please Leave Me Alone"	0:47
6.	"Save Me"	4:51
7.	"Maybe Nowhere"	5:14
8.	"What Is the Point"	1:47
9.	"Black Hole" (featuring Reggie Watts)	4:12
10.	"In Your Mind"	0:50
11.	"Tofu"	2:13
12.	"Fried Rice"	1:06
13.	"Where'd You Go"	4:43
14.	"Wanna Die"	2:41
15.	"Staring at the Wall"	2:06
16.	"I Don't Recognise My Hands"	1:08
17.	"It's Okay" (featuring Kassa Overall)	3:31
18.	"Remedy"	3:35
19.	"Thank You for the Day"	4:29
Total length:		57:41

== Personnel ==
Credits adapted from the album's liner notes.

- Emma-Jean Thackray – lead vocals, synthesisers, backing vocals, production, mixing, recording, arrangements (all tracks); drums (tracks 1–13, 16–18), bass guitar (1–3, 5–11, 13, 14, 17, 18), electric guitar (1–3, 6–11, 13, 15, 17, 18), Rhodes (1–3, 5, 7–19), piano (2, 4, 6, 7), percussion (4, 6, 9, 12, 14, 16, 18, 19), trumpet (4, 8, 13–15); trombone, flugel (4, 8, 14, 15); euphonium (4), congas (6), drum programming (9, 14, 15, 19), tuba (10, 16), guitar (17), art direction, layout
- Daddy Kev – mastering
- Reggie Watts – vocals (track 9)
- Kassa Overall – drums, vocals (track 17)
- Madam Zajj – photography
- Helen Asher – hair, makeup
- Danny Byrne – typeface, layout

== Charts ==
Chart performance for Weirdo
Chart (2025)	Peak position
Scottish Albums (Official Charts)	67
UK Album Downloads (Official Charts)	12
