= Emma-Jean Thackray =

English musician (born 1989 or 1990)

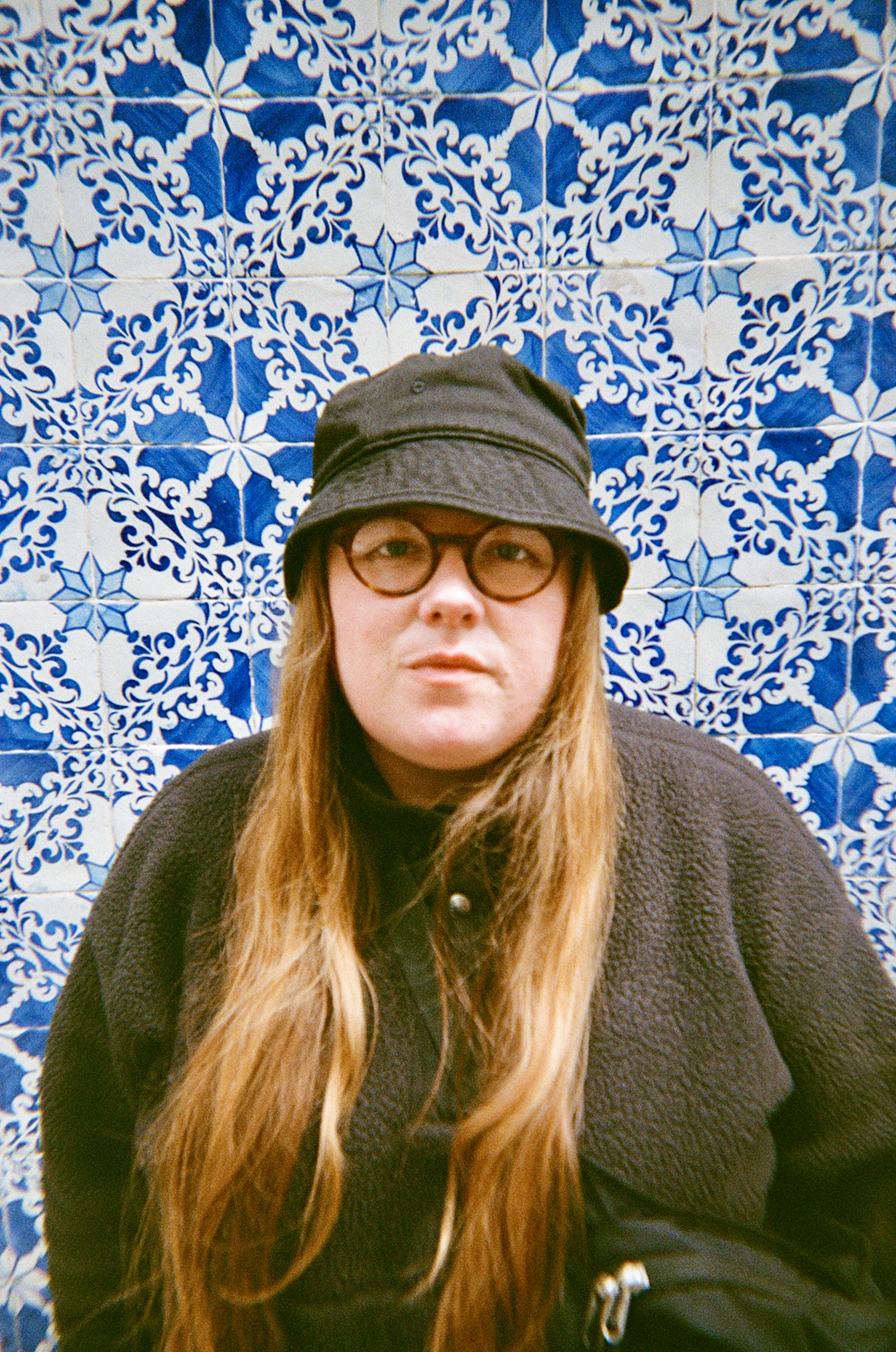
- Thackray in 2022

Background information
- Born: Emma-Jean Thackray; 1989 or 1990 (age 36–37); Leeds, West Yorkshire, England
- Origin: Leeds, England, UK
- Genre: Jazz
- Occupations: Musician; producer; singer; bandleader; songwriter; composer; DJ; broadcaster
- Instruments: Voice; trumpet; guitar; bass guitar; drums; percussion; keyboard; electronics
- Years active: 2015–present
- Labels: Brownswood; Parlophone; Movementt; International Anthem; The Vinyl Factory
- Website: emmajeanthackray.com

Emma-Jean Thackray (born 1989 or 1990) is an English musician and DJ, described by The Guardian as a "musical polymath". She is a multi-instrumentalist, composer, producer and vocalist. She has directed the London Symphony Orchestra and performed at Glastonbury, won the Jazz FM public vote for act of the Year in 2021, and the following year won their Album of the Year awards for her debut album Yellow. She played every instrument, wrote every song and recorded each aspect of the music on her 2025 album Weirdo, apart from cameo appearances by Reggie Watts and Kassa Overall. She is signed to Gilles Peterson's Brownswood label and Parlophone.

Emma-Jean Thackray was nominated for the 2025 Mercury Music Prize.

== Early life ==
Thackray was born and brought up in Leeds, West Yorkshire, in a working-class family. She has spoken openly about growing up in a low income household. She began playing the cornet in primary school, using an instrument her parents bought from a second-hand music shop. By her teens, she was playing principal cornet and trumpet in several brass bands in Yorkshire. She studied jazz performance at the Royal Welsh College of Music and Drama under British jazz pianist and composer Keith Tippett. After her studies at the college, she took a Masters in orchestral jazz composition at Trinity Laban Conservatoire of Music and Dance under composers Issie Barratt and Errollyn Wallen.

== Music career ==
In 2016, Thackray self-released her debut EP Walrus. The same year, she was selected as a participant on the Red Bull Music Academy. She wrote and played all the music on Ley Lines (2018), which was released by Vinyl Factory, as well as recording, producing and mixing the release. She appeared on a 2018 Clash list of "women pushing UK jazz forward".

The following year her collaboration with drummer Makaya McCraven, "Too Shy" / "Run Dem", was released on Chicago label International Anthem. In September 2019, she was asked by BBC Radio 1 to arrange a cover of Dua Lipa's "New Rules" with all sounds made by brass instruments and car horns, as a trailer for the Greg James Breakfast Show.

In 2020, Thackray started self-releasing her own music under the label name Movementt, in collaboration with Warp Records. The label's first release was her solo EP Rain Dance, followed by reissues of her 2016 EP Walrus and 2018 EP Ley Lines. Also in 2020, Thackray released an EP, Um Yang, with Night Dreamer Records.

In June 2021, Thackray made her first appearance on Jools Holland's BBC Two show Later... with Jools Holland performing "Say Something". Later the same year she was signed by Warner Chappell Music.

In July 2021, Thackray self-released Yellow, her debut album. The album reached No. 1 in the UK Jazz Albums Chart, and No. 3 in the UK Independent Albums Chart. Movementt released the four-track improvised EP Talking Therapy by Talking Therapy Ensemble in February 2022. The ensemble recorded at Abbey Road Studios as part of Abbey Road Amplify x Pitchfork London Sessions. In 2022, Thackray scored the soundtrack to a short film, Erax, for Netflix, directed by Hebru Brantley. In 2025, she released second album Weirdo, which she self-produced, self-performed and self-mixed.

=== DJing ===
Thackray is also a DJ and has been booked to play records at festivals including Glastonbury. and BBC6Music Festival.

She hosted a monthly show on Worldwide FM between October 2018 and October 2022. The show was nominated for a Best Radio Show at DJ Magazine's Best of British awards 2022. As well as covering for Mary Anne Hobbs on 6Music and Soweto Kinch on BBC Radio 3, she hosted occasional shows on NTS and multiple residencies on Jazz FM. She currently has a monthly residency on Tokyo station J-Wave.

== Personal life ==
Thackray lives in south London. She is a Taoist and regularly releases music inspired by her practice.

A lifelong fan of Leeds United FC, Thackray has appeared on TalkSport, and came second in the Predictions League for Chris Sutton's weekly football feature on the BBC. In March 2025 she won One Football's AI vs Humans Predictions feature.

In January 2023 her long-term partner died suddenly from natural causes. She wrote and recorded the album Weirdo in 2025 in part to cope with her grief over her partner's death. "The album is about survival," she told The Guardian. "If I hadn't made this record, I would not be here".

Thackray is autistic, has ADHD, and has spoken openly about her mental health struggles, including dealing with obsessive-compulsive disorder. She is a vegan and identifies as queer.

== Discography ==
=== Studio albums ===
- Yellow (2021, Movementt)
- Weirdo (2025, Brownswood / Parlophone)

=== Extended plays ===
- Walrus (2016, Movementt)
- Ley Lines (2018, The Vinyl Factory/ Movementt)
- Um Yang 음 양 (2020, Night Dreamer)
- Rain Dance (2020, Movementt)

== Awards and recognition ==
Award	Year	Nominee(s)	Category	Result	Ref.
Jazz FM Awards	2019	Herself	Breakthrough Artist	Nominated	
Jazz FM Awards	2021	Herself	Act Of The Year	Won	
MOBO Awards	2021	Herself	Best Jazz Act	Nominated	
Jazz FM Awards	2022	Yellow	Album Of The Year	Won	
AIM Independent Music Awards	2022	Yellow	Best Independent Album	Nominated	
DJ Mag Best of British Awards	2022	Radio Show on Worldwide FM	Best Radio Show	Nominated	
Mercury Prize	2025	Weirdo	Album of the Year	Nominated	
Jazz FM Awards	2026	Weirdo	Album Of The Year	Nominated	
Jazz FM Awards	2026	Herself	Innovation Award	Won	
Radio Eins	2026	Weirdo	Soundcheck Award	Won	
