= Damon Locks =

American artist and musician

- Born: 1967 or 1968 (age 58–59); Silver Spring, Maryland, US
- Genres: Post-hardcore; jazz; spoken word; sound collage
- Occupations: Vocalist; sound artist; visual artist; record producer; educator; DJ
- Years active: 1988–present
- Label: International Anthem
- Member of: Exploding Star Orchestra; Black Monument Ensemble
- Formerly of: Trenchmouth; The Eternals

Damon Locks is an American musician, visual artist, and educator, best known for being the lead vocalist of the post-hardcore band Trenchmouth, a member of Rob Mazurek's Exploding Star Orchestra, and founder/director/composer for Black Monument Ensemble.

== Early life ==
Born and raised in Silver Spring, Maryland, Locks enrolled at the School of Visual Arts (SVA) in New York at eighteen, and moved to Chicago to attend the School of the Art Institute of Chicago (SAIC) two years later.

== Career ==
In 1988, Locks and his SVA classmate Fred Armisen and friend Wayne Montana formed Trenchmouth, a Chicago-based punk band, in which he was the lead vocalist and percussionist, Montana was the bassist, and Armisen was the drummer. The band released five albums during its active years: Construction of New Action (1991), Inside the Future (1993), Trenchmouth Vs. the Light of the Sun (1994), The Broadcasting System (1996), and best-of album Volumes, Amplifiers, Equalizers (1994). It disbanded in 1997. Locks and Montana founded another band, the Eternals, immediately afterwards, releasing five albums (with another on the way): The Eternals (2000), Rawar Style (2004), Heavy International (2007), and Approaching the Energy Field (2011), and Espiritu Zombi (2016).

In 2008, Locks joined Exploding Star Orchestra, a musical ensemble founded by Rob Mazurek, and worked on his first album with the ensemble, Bill Dixon with Exploding Star Orchestra, a collaboration with composer Bill Dixon. It was Dixon's final collaborative album before his death in 2010. Since then, he has been on further Exploding Star Orchestra albums: Dimensional Stardust (2020), Lightning Dreamers (2023), Galactic Parables, vol. 1 (2015), 63 Moons of Jupiter (2014), and Live at Adler Planetarium (2024).

Locks founded the jazz group Black Monument Ensemble in 2015, and recorded the group's debut album in 2018, a live album recorded at Garfield Park Conservatory in Chicago. Consisting of fifteen members, Black Monument Ensemble performed the album, titled Where Future Unfolds. The album was officially released in 2019 through International Anthem.

In 2020 and 2021, Locks released the second album for Black Monument Ensemble, Now (with Black Monument Ensemble), which was largely recorded outdoors in the back patio of Chicago’s Experimental Sound Studio due to the pandemic. In 2023, he collaborated with Rob Mazurek on a duo album, New Future City Radio (with Mazurek). In 2025, he released his first ever solo album, List of Demands.

== Discography ==
=== Albums ===
Title	Details
Where Future Unfolds (with Black Monument Ensemble)	Released: June 28, 2019; Label: International Anthem; Format: Digital download, streaming, vinyl, CD
Now (with Black Monument Ensemble)	Released: April 9, 2021; Label: International Anthem; Format: Digital download, streaming, vinyl, CD
New Future City Radio (with Rob Mazurek)	Released: July 28, 2023; Label: International Anthem; Format: Digital download, streaming, vinyl, CD
List of Demands	Released: January 31, 2025; Label: International Anthem; Format: Digital download, streaming, vinyl
