= International Anthem Recording Company =

Independent record label

- Industry: Independent record label
- Founded: 2014
- Founder: Scottie McNiece; David Allen
- Headquarters: Chicago, Illinois
- Website: www.intlanthem.com

International Anthem Recording Company is an American record label based in Chicago, Illinois. Formed in 2012 by Scottie McNiece and David Allen, and launched in 2014, the label mostly releases records that have been categorised as jazz, with a particular focus on artists from the Chicago area.

== History ==
The label formed when McNiece, a drummer originally from Indiana, moved to Chicago and started a live jazz night in a bar in the River North part of the city. He invited David Allen, a recording engineer based in South Illinois, to record the acts. The label's first release was Alternative Moon Cycles, by Chicago Underground trumpeter Rob Mazurek, in December 2014.

British DJ Gilles Peterson named International Anthem as his Label of the Year in 2020. In 2021 two of the label's releases, We’re New Again – A Reimagining by Gil Scott-Heron & Makaya McCraven and Suite for Max Brown by Jeff Parker, were nominated for Libera Awards Best Jazz Record, with the Scott-Heron/McCraven collaboration going on to win.

As well as releasing records independently they have put out co-releases with other labels including Don Giovanni, Nonesuch, and XL Recordings.

== Roster ==
The following artists have released albums through International Anthem

- Ahleuchatistas
- Alabaster DePlume
- Angel Bat Dawid
- Anteloper
- Miguel Atwood-Ferguson
- Bambi Kino Duo
- Bottle Tree
- Jaimie Branch
- Jeremiah Chiu
- Dos Santos
- Dezron Douglas
- Ben Lamar Gay
- Tcheser Holmes
- Marta Sofia Honer
- Macie Stewart
- Irreversible Entanglements
- Rob Jacobs
- Emmett Kelly
- KrushLove
- Damon Locks, Black Monument Ensemble
- Rob Mazurek
- Nick Mazzarella
- John McCowen
- Makaya McCraven
- Aquiles Navarro
- Carlos Niño
- Jeff Parker
- Resavoir
- Gil Scott-Heron
- SML
- Charles Stepney
- Emma-Jean Thackray
- Daniel Villarreal
- Jamire Williams
- Brandee Younger
