= Harish Raghavan =

American jazz bassist (born 1982)

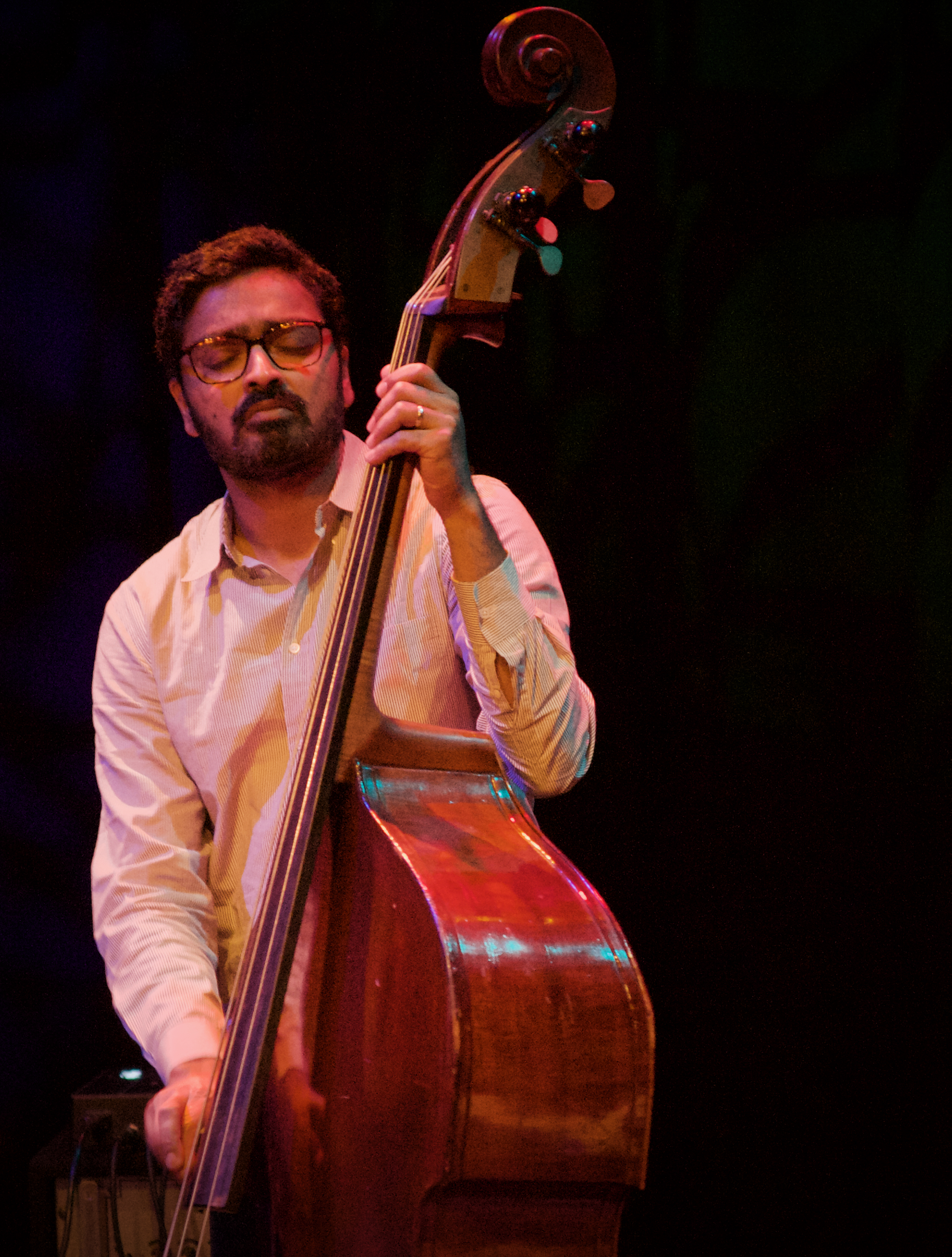

Background information
- Born: May 19, 1982 (age 44); Northbrook, Illinois
- Genres: Jazz
- Instrument: Upright bass
- Years active: 2006–present
- Label: Whirlwind Recordings
- Education: University of Southern California
- Website: harishraghavan.com

Harish Raghavan (born May 19, 1982) is an Indian American jazz bassist. His music combines aspects of Indian classical music and jazz.

The first instrument he picked up was the mridangam, but he switched to the upright bass at the age of 16. He received a Bachelor of Music degree from the University of Southern California, under the tutelage of John Clayton, Dave Carpenter and Robert Hurst. He finished as a semi-finalist in the Thelonious Monk Institute's International Jazz Bass Competition in 2009. After 12 years playing professionally, Raghavan released his debut album as a leader Calls for Action in 2019, teaming up with the group on Joel Ross's KingMaker album.

== Discography ==
=== As leader or co-leader ===
- Calls for Action (Whirlwind, 2019)
- In Tense (Whirlwind, 2022)
- Quartet (Self-released, 2026)

With ACT (Raghavan, Ben Wendel, and Nate Wood)

- ACT (2009, bjurecords)
- ACT II (2015, Self-released)

=== As sideman ===
With Ambrose Akinmusire

- When the Heart Emerges Glistening (Blue Note, 2011)
- The Imagined Savior Is Far Easier to Paint (Blue Note, 2014)
- A Rift in Decorum: Live at the Village Vanguard (Blue Note, 2017)
- On the Tender Spot of Every Calloused Moment (Blue Note, 2020)

With Walter Smith III

- Twio (2018, Whirlwind)
- In Common (2018, Whirlwind)
- Return to Casual (Blue Note, 2023)

With others

- Taylor Eigsti – Let It Come to You (Concord Jazz, 2008)
- Taylor Eigsti – Daylight at Midnight (Concord Jazz, 2010)
- Eric Harland – Voyager: Live by Night (Space Time, 2010)
- Eric Harland – Vipassana (GSI, 2014)
- Klemens Marktl Sextet – December (Fresh Sound New Talent, 2015)
- Logan Richardson – Shift (Blue Note, 2015)
- Dayna Stephens – Reminiscent (Criss Cross, 2015)
- Marko Churnchetz – Place to Live (Fresh Sound New Talent, 2019)
- Marquis Hill – New Gospel Revisited (Edition, 2022)
- Geoffrey Dean Quartet – Foundations (AMP, 2024)
- Travis Reuter – Quintet Music (Self-released, 2024)
- Tyshawn Sorey Trio – The Susceptible Now (Pi, 2024)
- Taylor Eigsti – Plot Armor (Ground Up, 2024)
- Geoffrey Dean Quartet – Conceptions (Cellar Live, 2025)
- Sora Kim – 0 = Expansion (Artbus, 2025)
- Sasha Berliner – Fantôme (Outside in Music, 2025)
- Alex Hitchcock – Letters from Afar (New Soil, 2025)
- Gregory Groover Jr. – Old Knew (Criss Cross, 2025)
- Eric Harland – Vipassana II (Ropeadope, 2026)
