= Life Forum =

Studio album by Gerald Clayton
- Released: April 2, 2013
- Recorded: October 1–3, 2012
- Studio: Sear Sound, New York City
- Genre: Jazz
- Length: 59:48
- Label: Concord Jazz
- Producer: Ben Wendel

Gerald Clayton chronology
Bond: The Paris Sessions (2011)	Life Forum (2013)	Tributary Tales (2017)

Life Forum is the third studio album by American jazz pianist Gerald Clayton, released on the Concord Jazz label on April 2, 2013.

== Concept ==
Clayton stated: "This record is about gathering my favorite musicians and giving them the best platform to explore and openly express themselves. I take the same concepts and values that lead to creative expression as a credo to live by, hence Life Forum."

== Reception ==
Professional ratings
Review scores
Source	Rating
AllMusic	4/5 stars
PopMatters	8/10

Matt Collar, writing for AllMusic, noted that "Although the album works as a showcase for Clayton's larger group aesthetic... it is still Clayton, with his deft, nuanced piano chops, extensive, motivic improvisation, and broad, evocative compositional skills who stays in the spotlight."

== Track listing ==
All tracks are written by Gerald Clayton except where noted.

No.	Title	Writer(s)	Length
1.	"A Life Forum" (poem by Carl Hancock Rux)		2:52
2.	"Future Reflection"		4:52
3.	"Shadamanthem"		6:37
4.	"Sir Third"		4:18
5.	"Deep Dry Ocean"		5:27
6.	"Dusk Baby"	co-written by Sachal Vasandani	5:39
7.	"Mao Nas Massa"		4:47
8.	"Prelude"		0:59
9.	"Some Always"		5:37
10.	"Like Water"		5:16
11.	"Unhidden"		3:57
12.	"When an Angel Sheds a Feather"	co-written by Vasandani	5:31
13.	"Under Madhatter Medicinal Groupon (UMMG)"	UMMG by Billy Strayhorn	3:56
Total length:			59:48

== Personnel ==
- Gerald Clayton – piano, Rhodes piano, vocals (10)
- Joe Sanders – double bass (1–11; 13)
- Justin Brown – drums (1–11)
- Ambrose Akinmusire – trumpet (1–3, 8, 9)
- Logan Richardson – alto saxophone (1–10)
- Dayna Stephens – tenor saxophone (1–3, 6, 8, 9; 13)
- Gretchen Parlato – vocals (1, 2, 4, 8–10, 12)
- Sachal Vasandani – lyrics (12), vocals (1, 2, 6, 8–10, 12)
- Carl Hancock Rux – poem composition and recitation (1)
