= Happening: Live at the Village Vanguard =

Live album by Gerald Clayton
- Released: July 10, 2020
- Recorded: April 2019
- Venues: Village Vanguard, New York City
- Genre: Jazz
- Length: 75:06
- Label: Blue Note

Gerald Clayton chronology
Tributary Tales (2017)	Happening: Live at the Village Vanguard (2020)	Bells On Sand (2022)

Happening: Live at the Village Vanguard is a live album by jazz pianist Gerald Clayton, released on July 10, 2020, his first for the Blue Note label.

Regarding the album, which was recorded in April 2019 before the coronavirus pandemic, Clayton said, "The idea of having a recording of a live concert takes on a new meaning now that we're unable to actually gather anymore. [...] I would hope that... people are more inspired than ever to recognize that this music is happening, that it's a living art form."

The album was nominated at the 2021 Grammy Awards in the category of Best Jazz Instrumental Album, while the track "Celia" was nominated for Best Improvised Jazz Solo at the same awards.

== Reception ==
Professional ratings
Review scores
Source	Rating
AllMusic	4/5 stars
DownBeat	4/5 stars
Jazzwise	4/5 stars
RTÉ	3.5/5 stars
The Times	4/5 stars

John Murph of DownBeat wrote, "this thoroughly enthralling album... finds Clayton at a new creative height as a stunning pianist, gifted composer and burgeoning bandleader." The AllMusic review by Thom Jurek praised the album as "a splendid example of Clayton's arrival as a master possessed of enviable and original technique and a kaleidoscopic imagination". John Fordham, writing for Jazzwise, stated, "this fine live set certainly confirms the hipness, but [with] a captivating capacity to veer on and off the beaten track as well." Additionally, Paddy Kehoe of RTÉ described the album as "an energetic, if not cerebral post-Bop set, with occasional relief from the frenzy, in quiet and wistful moments on tracks like 'Body and Soul' and the pianist-composer's own 'Envisionings'." Finally, Thomas Conrad for JazzTimes, added, "It is not piano-centric. [...] Clayton's piano contributions, in their wild, free-spilling, lyrical aspiration, are consistently stunning."

== Track listing ==
All tracks are written by Gerald Clayton except where noted.

No.	Title	Writer(s)	Length
1.	"Patience Patients"		10:59
2.	"A Light"		9:21
3.	"Celia"	Bud Powell	10:34
4.	"Rejuvenation Agenda"		7:21
5.	"Envisionings"		11:03
6.	"Body and Soul"	Johnny Green; Edward Heyman; Robert Sour; Frank Eyton	11:47
7.	"Take the Coltrane"	Duke Ellington	14:01
Total length:			75:06

== Personnel ==
- Gerald Clayton – piano
- Logan Richardson – alto saxophone (1, 2, 4, 5, 7)
- Walter Smith III – tenor saxophone (1, 2, 4, 5, 7)
- Joe Sanders – bass
- Marcus Gilmore – drums
