= Tributary Tales =

Studio album by Gerald Clayton
- Released: April 21, 2017
- Genre: Jazz
- Length: 64:26
- Label: Motéma Music

Gerald Clayton chronology
Life Forum (2013)	Tributary Tales (2017)	Happening: Live at the Village Vanguard (2020)

Tributary Tales is a studio album by American jazz pianist Gerald Clayton, released on April 21, 2017, by Motéma Music.

== Reception ==
Professional ratings
Review scores
Source	Rating
All About Jazz	4/5 stars
DownBeat	4.5/5 stars

Niccolò Lucarelli, writing for All About Jazz, stated: "[It] is an album capable of engaging and surprising at every moment, of conveying the beauty of a musical genre that knows no boundaries."

J. D. Considine of DownBeat wrote, "Like the waterways it evokes, Tributary Tales is nourishing, refreshing and full of great depths."

== Track listing ==
All tracks are written by Gerald Clayton except where noted.

No.	Title	Length
1.	"Unforeseen"	5:58
2.	"Patience Patients"	6:13
3.	"Search For"	1:07
4.	"A Light"	4:19
5.	"Reach For"	0:36
6.	"Envisionings"	6:43
7.	"Reflect On"	1:09
8.	"Lovers Reverie" (featuring Aja Monet & Carl Hancock Rux)	3:11
9.	"Wakeful"	5:54
10.	"Soul Stomp"	7:47
11.	"Are We"	7:00
12.	"Engage In"	1:29
13.	"Squinted"	7:10
14.	"Dimensions: Interwoven" (featuring Aja Monet & Carl Hancock Rux)	5:50
Total length:		64:26

Bonus track
No.	Title	Writer(s)	Length
15.	"Stella by Starlight" (featuring Dayna Stephens)	Victor Young	7:54
Total length:			72:20

== Personnel ==
- Gerald Clayton – piano, keyboards
- Logan Richardson – alto saxophone
- Ben Wendel – tenor saxophone, bassoon (8, 10)
- Dayna Stephens – baritone saxophone (9)
- Joe Sanders – bass
- Justin Brown – drums
- Aja Monet, Carl Hancock Rux – spoken word (8, 14)
- Sachal Vasandani – vocals (13)
- Henry Cole – percussion (1, 10, 12, 13)
- Gabriel Lugo – percussion (1, 10, 12–14), post-production
