= Dorismond =

Dorismond is a Haitian family name. It can refer to:

- Bigga Haitian (born 1964), the stage name of Haitian musician Charles Andre Dorismond
- Patrick Dorismond (1974–2000), American security guard who was killed by undercover police
- Shirley Dorismond, Canadian politician and former union leader and nurse
