= Joe Sanders (bassist) =

American jazz double bassist (born 1984)

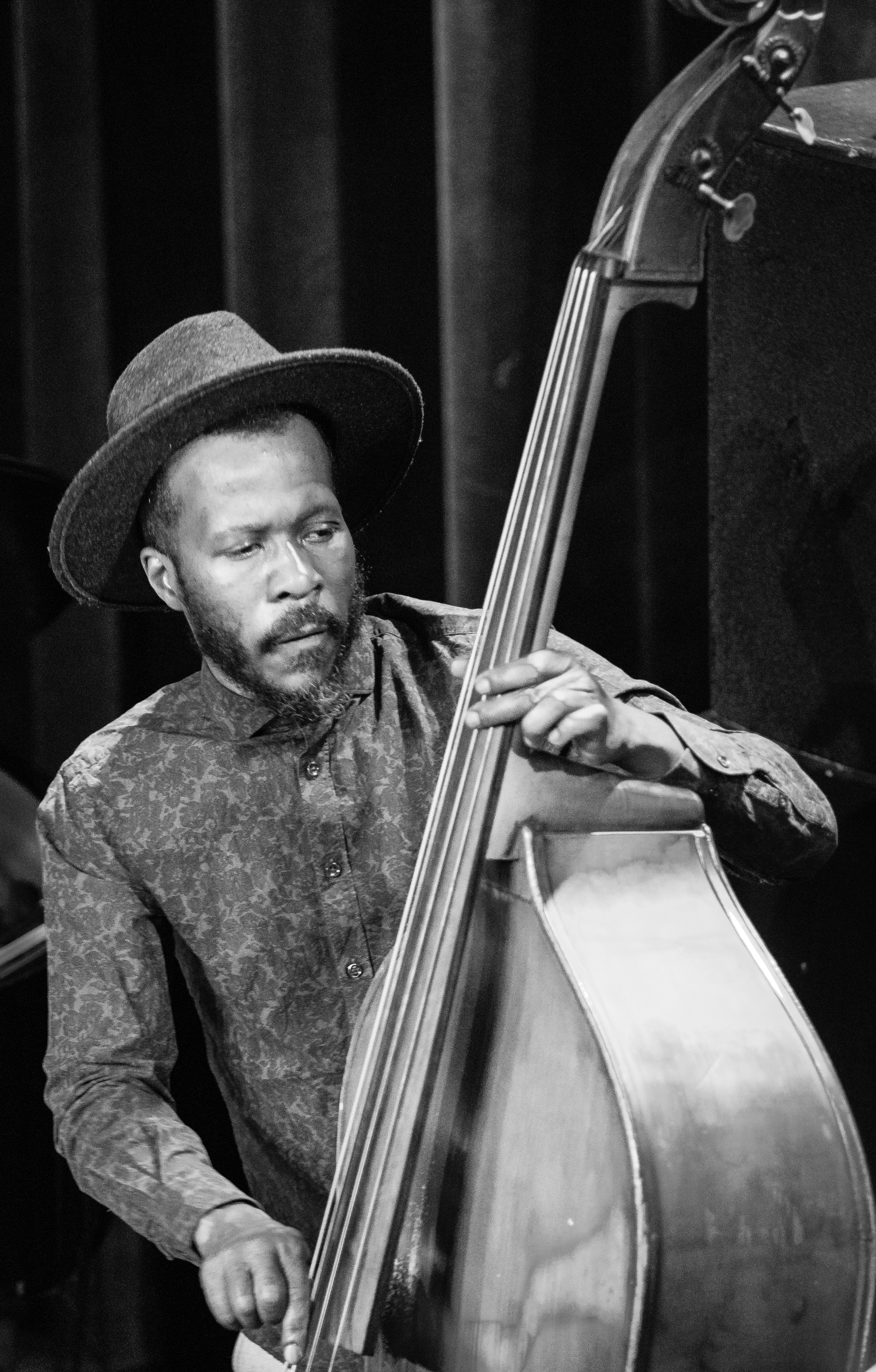
Joe Sanders in 2022

Joe Sanders (born 1984) is an American jazz double bassist from Milwaukee, Wisconsin. In 2023, saxophonist Joshua Redman described Sanders to the New York Times as among "the greats of [his] generation and [one] of the most active and emulated musicians on the scene today."

== Background ==
Sanders was born in Milwaukee in 1984 and grew up at the intersection of Ninth and Locust Streets. A 2002 Milwaukee High School of the Arts graduate, Sanders studied music at the Brubeck Institute at the University of the Pacific in California under bassist Christian McBride after winning a rare scholarship to the then-new program. Sanders additionally studied at the Thelonious Monk Institute. He studied under Terence Blanchard, learning from John Clayton and Bob Hurst, and moved to New York thereafter.

== Career ==
Sanders recorded the album Introducing Joe Sanders in 2011 with his New York band, featuring pianist Luis Perdomo, alto saxophonist Will Vinson, and drummer Rodney Green. The album was released by Criss Cross Jazz. Sanders has played bass on recordings by numerous notable modern-day jazz artists. Sanders has performed in Vietnam and India with Wayne Shorter and Herbie Hancock, and toured North America and Europe with the Roy Hargrove Quintet.

He collaborated with Justin Brown as a member of Gerald Clayton's trio, and toured with Charles Lloyd as part of his quartet in 2015.

In 2023, he performed on Joshua Redman's Where Are We.

== Personal life ==
As of 2022, Sanders lives outside Marseille, France with his family.

=== Awards ===
- Second Place, 2009 Thelonious Monk Institute of Jazz International Bass Competition.
- Second Prize Recipient, ISB Double Bass Competition, Jazz Division (2009).

== Selected discography ==
=== As leader ===
- Introducing Joe Sanders (Criss Cross Jazz 2011)
- Humanity (2017)

=== As sideman ===
- Joshua Redman ft. Gabrielle Cavassa, Where Are We (Blue Note 2023)
- Kendrick Scott Oracle, A Wall Becomes a Bridge (Blue Note 2019)
- Ben Wendel, What We Bring (Motéma, 2016)
- Dayna Stephens, That Nepenthetic Place (Sunnyside, 2013)
- Walter Smith III (with Ambrose Akinmusire, Jason Moran, Eric Harland, Logan Richardson) (Criss Cross 2010)
- Theo Croker, In the Tradition (Arbors Records 2009)
- Gerald Clayton, Two-Shade (2009)
- Oran Etkin, Kelenia (Motéma, 2009)
- Ambrose Akinmusire, Prelude... to Cora (Fresh Sound 2008)
