= Beauty Is Enough =

Studio album by Ambrose Akinmusire
- Released: June 23, 2023
- Studios: Saint-Eustache church, Paris, France
- Genre: Free jazz
- Length: 47:41
- Label: Origami Harvest

Ambrose Akinmusire chronology
| On the Tender Spot of Every Calloused Moment (2020) | Beauty Is Enough (2023) | Owl Song (2023) |

Beauty Is Enough is a 2023 studio album by American jazz trumpeter Ambrose Akinmusire. It has received positive reviews from critics.

== Reception ==
At Jazzwise, Kevin Le Gendre gave this album four out of five stars, stating that the brief songs are "akin to involving short stories or portraits that balance exploratory texture with fraught, concise melody to create a form of blues, which is not reduced to strategies such as the tried and tested 'moan and groan". Phil Freeman of Stereogum asked jazz musicians to list their best jazz albums of the year and Sylvie Courvoisier and Steve Lehman included this album. Giovanni Russonello of The New York Times gave a spotlight to "Cora Campbell", writing that the album is "something of a rite of passage" and on this track, "you'll hear him squeeze his notes tightly, letting them tremor and wriggle a bit" that is "not overloaded, but he's never at rest".

== Track listing ==
1. "To: Taymoor" – 4:54
2. "2->1<-" – 2:13
3. "Carvin." – 4:34
4. "Turns" – 1:48
5. "Launchpad" – 2:54
6. "Olusiji SR" – 3:12
7. "Off the ledge" – 3:44
8. "To: Shabnam" – 4:11
9. "Achilles" – 2:18
10. "Boots and Jewels" – 1:18
11. "Wallace" – 2:03
12. "-Ann_" – 2:34
13. "Rio" – 2:47
14. "Self-Portrait" – 3:30
15. "Sunknees" – 2:53
16. "To: Cora Campbell" – 3:41

== Personnel ==
- Ambrose Akinmusire – trumpet
- Julien Basseres – recording
- Dave Darlington – mixing, mastering
- Mike Dyer – artwork
- Remake Design – artwork

== See also ==
- 2023 in American music
- 2023 in jazz
- List of 2023 albums
