= Bond: The Paris Sessions =

Studio album by Gerald Clayton
- Released: May 10, 2011
- Studio: Studio de Meudon, Meudon, France
- Genre: Jazz
- Length: 70:50
- Label: EmArcy

Gerald Clayton chronology
Two-Shade (2009)	Bond: The Paris Sessions (2011)	Life Forum (2013)

Bond: The Paris Sessions is a 2011 studio album by American jazz pianist Gerald Clayton released on the EmArcy label, his second release.

== Reception ==
Professional ratings
Review scores
Source	Rating
AllMusic	4.5/5 stars

Ken Dryden, writing for AllMusic, stated, "His interpretations of standards are remarkably fresh, considering how often they have been recorded in a jazz setting. [...] He shows a surprising maturity for his age, as his pieces display a wealth of stylistic influences yet retain memorable themes that hold one's interest as well." Nate Chinen of The New York Times wrote regarding the album, "Clayton hasn't abandoned his core impulses as he evolves; another is that he doesn't seem remotely done evolving." Thomas Conrad for JazzTimes, added "His compositions are like graceful, evocative melodic and harmonic gestures that start in the middle and break off before you expect."

== Track listing ==
All tracks are written by Gerald Clayton except where noted.

No.	Title	Writer(s)	Length
1.	"If I Were a Bell"	Frank Loesser	7:46
2.	"Bond: The Cast"		3:45
3.	"Bootleg Bruise"		5:07
4.	"Major Hope"		6:14
5.	"Bond: Fresh Squeeze"		4:02
6.	"Snake Bite"		3:51
7.	"Sun Glimpse"		6:34
8.	"Which Persons?"		1:21
9.	"3D"		6:39
10.	"Nobody Else But Me"	Jerome Kern; Oscar Hammerstein II	4:37
11.	"All the Things You Are"	Kern; Hammerstein II	3:43
12.	"Bond: The Release"		3:45
13.	"Shout and Cry"		3:30
14.	"Round Come Round"		4:51
15.	"Hank"		5:05
Total length:			70:50

== Personnel ==
- Gerald Clayton – piano, organ
- Joe Sanders – double bass
- Justin Brown – drums
