= The Imagined Savior Is Far Easier to Paint =

Studio album by Ambrose Akinmusire
- Released: March 10, 2014
- Recorded: 2013
- Studio: Brooklyn Recording, Brooklyn; Revolution Recording Inc., Toronto
- Genre: Jazz
- Length: 78:38
- Label: Blue Note/Capitol/Universal
- Producer: Ambrose Akinmusire

Ambrose Akinmusire chronology
When the Heart Emerges Glistening (2011)	The Imagined Savior Is Far Easier to Paint (2014)	A Rift in Decorum (2017)

Professional ratings
Aggregate scores
Source	Rating
Metacritic	86/100
Review scores
Source	Rating
AllMusic	4/5 stars
All About Jazz	5/5 stars
Jazz Forum	3/5 stars
Jazzwise	3/5 stars
PopMatters	9/10 stars
Tom Hull	B−

The Imagined Savior Is Far Easier to Paint is the third studio album by American jazz trumpeter Ambrose Akinmusire. The album was released on March 10, 2014 by Blue Note, Capitol, and Universal labels.

== Background ==
This is his second album for Blue Note. Akinmusire wrote 12 of the 13 tracks and produced the album. Composition "Rollcall for Those Absent" is similar to "My Name is Oscar" from his 2011 album When the Heart Emerges Glistening as it adds social context to music, this time through reading the names of young people killed from gunfire, including Patrick Dorismond and Trayvon Martin). "Ceaseless Inexhaustible Child (cyntoia brown)" explores a theme of a woman serving a life sentence for a murder that she committed as a teenager. "Our Basement (ed)" suggests the interior monologue of a homeless man.

== Reception ==
Will Layman of PopMatters stated: "The virtues of The Imagined Savior Is Far Easier to Paint are, finally, so varied and many that some readers of this review may wonder if it sounds disjointed. And the answer is no. Even though Akinmusire cycles his music through four different vocal performances, several different combinations of instruments, mixing genres with abandon along the way, the result is unified in the best sense. Akinmusire's voice on trumpet is a clear through-line that brings one very interesting voice to every song. The variations in tone, form, and emotion make Imagined Savior a satisfying journey rather than an immersion in a single mood, such that listening to this album as it was conceived and put together by a great artist is a whole, marvelous experience. Ambrose Akinmusire, with his two most recent recordings, stakes a claim as one of the very best musicians in jazz – or any other style of music. He won't be contained. Neither will your emotions as you soak up this daring, fulfilling, perfectly crafted 80 minutes of music."

Thom Jurek of Allmusic wrote: "Akinmusire self-produced this set and showcases a diverse range of carefully scripted, genre-blurring compositions—modern classical, vanguard pop, spoken word—in addition to jazz... The Imagined Savior Is Far Easier to Paint is provocative: its moodiness, myriad musical directions, and 79-minute length may be initially off-putting. What is revealed with repeated listening, however, is that this set's achievement is commensurate with its ambition."

== Track listing ==
All tracks are written by Ambrose Akinmusire except where noted.

No.	Title	Writer(s)	Length
1.	"Marie Christie"		3:17
2.	"As We Fight (Willie Penrose)"		6:25
3.	"Our Basement (Ed)" (featuring Becca Stevens)	Becca Stevens	6:28
4.	"Vartha"		7:48
5.	"Memo (G. Learson)"		5:53
6.	"The Beauty of Dissolving Portraits"		4:14
7.	"Asiam (Joan)" (featuring Theo Bleckmann)	Akinmusire, Theo Bleckmann	6:03
8.	"Bubbles (John William Sublett)"		3:55
9.	"Ceaseless Inexhaustible Child (Cyntoia Brown)" (featuring Cold Specks)	Akinmusire, Cold Specks	6:12
10.	"Rollcall for Those Absent"		3:39
11.	"J.E. Nilmah (Ecclesiastes 6:10)"		5:13
12.	"Inflatedbyspinning"		3:03
13.	"Richard (Conduit)"		16:28
Total length:			78:38

== Personnel ==
- Ambrose Akinmusire – trumpet, songwriter, producer
- Walter Smith III – saxophone
- Elena Pinderhughes – flute
- Sam Harris – piano
- Charles Altura – guitar
- Harish Raghavan – bass
- Justin Brown – drums
- OSSO String Quartet – strings
- Becca Stevens – vocals, songwriter, lyricist (track 3)
- Theo Bleckmann – vocals, lyricist (track 7)
- Cold Specks – vocals, lyricist (track 9)
