= Patrick Dorismond =

Victim of a police shooting

- Born: Patrick Moses Dorismond; February 28, 1974; New York City, New York, U.S.
- Died: March 16, 2000 (aged 26); New York City, New York, U.S.
- Cause of death: Gunshot wound
- Occupation: Security guard
- Known for: Being killed by an undercover NYPD officer
- Children: Two

Patrick Moses Dorismond (February 28, 1974 – March 16, 2000) was an American security guard and father of two children who was killed by undercover New York City Police Department officers during the early morning of March 16, 2000. He was the younger brother of Bigga Haitian.

== Death ==
The undercover police officer who moonlighted as a paid detail for businesses inside the NYC Port Authority under the supervision of the P.A.P.D approached Dorismond and his friend as they were standing outside the "Distinguished Wakamba Cocktail Lounge" and asked Dorismond where he and his partners could purchase marijuana.

The officers say the scuffle began when Dorismond became angry after they propositioned him, loudly declaring he was not a drug dealer. They state he threw a punch at a second officer and with his friend, Kevin Kaiser, began attacking him. Officer Vasquez said he came to his partner's aid, hearing one of the men yelling "Get his gun!", drew his weapon and identified himself as a police officer. He said Dorismond grabbed the gun, causing it to discharge into his chest.

Dorismond's friend, Kevin Kaiser, says that neither of the officers identified themselves. He says he attempted unsuccessfully to pull Dorismond back from the confrontation. He described the first undercover cop who had approached Dorismond as aggressive and "in their face". Kaiser said it was one of the cops who initiated the fight, hitting Dorismond first.

An ambulance arrived on the scene within minutes of the shooting and Dorismond was transported to St. Clare's Hospital where attempts to resuscitate him proved futile. The single bullet from Vasquez's 9mm pistol had struck Dorismond's aorta and his right lung, and he rapidly bled to death.

== Aftermath ==
Much of the controversy over the Dorismond shooting revolved around then-Mayor Rudy Giuliani, who was then in the midst of an abortive United States Senate campaign. His release of Dorismond's sealed juvenile delinquency record immediately after the shooting raised the ire of the African-American community as well as critics of the Mayor, whose office defended the release using the rationale that the right to privacy does not survive an individual's death. Giuliani also said that he only wanted to show that Dorismond was "no altar boy". Ironically, Dorismond had attended the same Catholic school as Giuliani and had indeed been an altar boy. Giuliani's actions became a hot-button issue in his Senate campaign against Hillary Clinton and cost him several points in the polls.

Dorismond's funeral, a Catholic Mass in Brooklyn, was a highly emotional affair marred by clashes between thousands of protestors and the NYPD. A total of 23 police officers were injured, and several protesters were arrested.

On July 27, 2000, a grand jury declined to indict Officer Vasquez in the death of Dorismond, announcing that they had found the shooting to be accidental.

On March 12, 2003, the City of New York agreed to pay the Dorismond family $2.25 million to settle a suit filed on behalf of the family.

== In popular culture ==
In 2000, the New York City feminist band Le Tigre released the song "Bang! Bang!" on their EP From the Desk of Mr. Lady as a critique of the incident. The song calls the police out on racial profiling. Kathleen Hanna sings: "Wrong fucking time / Wrong fucking place / There is no fucking way / This is not about race".

Immortal Technique commented on the incident in the song "The Other White Meat":

Cops don't stop and search us, cause they think we a threat
They making money for the prison industrial complex
Extorting hookers for sex and then arresting them
And murdering people of color instead of protecting them
You killed Patrick Dorismond and then disrespected him
Now most cops disagree with the shit that I spit,
But I got 41 reasons to tell you to suck a dick

Dorismond is the first name mentioned in the recitation "Rollcall for Those Absent", from the album The Imagined Savior Is Far Easier to Paint (Blue Note, 2014) by jazz trumpeter Ambrose Akinmusire.

== See also ==
- List of unarmed African Americans killed by law enforcement officers in the United States
