= Where Are We =

Studio album by Joshua Redman
- Released: September 15, 2023
- Studio: Esplanade Studios, New Orleans
- Genre: Jazz
- Length: 60:30
- Label: Blue Note
- Producer: Joshua Redman

Joshua Redman chronology
LongGone (2022)	Where Are We (2023)	Words Fall Short (2025)

Professional ratings
Review scores
Source	Rating
All About Jazz	3/5 stars
AllMusic	4/5 stars
The Arts Desk	2/5 stars
DownBeat	5/5 stars
Financial Times	4/5 stars
Jazzwise	4/5 stars
Mojo	4/5 stars
The Times	3/5 stars
Tom Hull	B+
Winnipeg Free Press	4.5/5 stars

Where Are We is a studio album by American jazz saxophonist Joshua Redman recorded with vocalist Gabrielle Cavassa. Blue Note released the album on September 15, 2023. This is his first studio album for Blue Note label and the 16th release as a leader overall. This is also his first album to feature vocal parts.

== Reception ==
Steve Baltin of Forbes wrote, "Thirty years into his career, acclaimed jazz saxophonist/composer Joshua Redman is continuing to chart new territory. On his stunning new album, Where Are We, Redman marks a few firsts. For starters it's his debut on iconic jazz label Blue Note. And, much more importantly, it marks his first album working with a featured vocalist, as rising star Gabrielle Cavassa takes the vocal lead throughout the collection." Mike Hobart of Financial Times stated, "Technical levels are high, stylistic references broad and moods are subtle and bittersweet — the album’s theme is both the joy of gathering and the angst suffered when people are unjustly separated."

== Track listing ==
Where Are We track listing
No.	Title	Writer(s)	Length
1.	"After Minneapolis (face toward mo[u]rning)"	Woody Guthrie	7:44
2.	"Streets of Philadelphia"	Bruce Springsteen	5:20
3.	"Chicago Blues"	Count Basie, James Rushing, Sufjan Stevens	4:53
4.	"Baltimore"	Gabriel Kahane	5:37
5.	"By the Time I Get to Phoenix"	Jimmy Webb	4:41
6.	"Do You Know What It Means to Miss New Orleans?"	Louis Alter, Eddie De Lange	5:05
7.	"Manhattan"	Lorenz Hart, Richard Rodgers	3:55
8.	"My Heart in San Francisco (Holiday)"	George C. Cory, Douglass Cross, Thelonious Monk	3:13
9.	"That's New England"	Charles Ives, James Sinclair	4:47
10.	"Alabama (intro)"	John Coltrane	0:17
11.	"Stars Fell on Alabama"	Frank S. Perkins, Mitchell Parish	1:55
12.	"Alabama"	John Coltrane	7:54
13.	"Where Are You?"	Harold Adamson, Jimmy McHugh	5:10
Total length:			60:30

Japanese edition bonus track
No.	Title	Writer(s)	Length
14.	"Bright Mississippi"	Monk	3:55
Total length:			64:36

== Personnel ==
- Joshua Redman – saxophone
- Peter Bernstein – guitar
- Brian Blade – drums
- Gabrielle Cavassa – vocals
- Aaron Parks – piano
- Nicholas Payton – trumpet
- Kurt Rosenwinkel – guitar
- Joel Ross – vibraphone
- Joe Sanders – bass

== Charts ==
Chart performance for Where Are We
Chart (2023)	Peak position
Austrian Albums (Ö3 Austria)	49
