= Words Fall Short =

2025 studio album by Joshua Redman

Studio album by Joshua Redman
- Released: June 20, 2025
- Recorded: November 30, 2024 – December 2, 2024
- Studios: Oktaven Audio, Mount Vernon, NY
- Genre: Jazz
- Length: 45:29
- Label: Blue Note
- Producer: Joshua Redman

Joshua Redman chronology
Where Are We (2023)	Words Fall Short (2025)

Words Fall Short is a studio album by American jazz saxophonist Joshua Redman, debuting a quartet including himself, pianist Paul Cornish, bassist Philip Norris, and drummer Nazir Ebo. Redman's second album for Blue Note, it was released on June 20, 2025.

== Background ==
This release follows his prior album, Where Are We, made with singer Gabrielle Cavassa. Her presence remains on the final piece, "Era's End". Redman has shifted his focus to a new group of musicians: bassist Philip Norris, drummer Nazir Ebo, and pianist Paul Cornish. Each of them performs on the album without altering its overall unity.

== Reception ==
Professional ratings
Review scores
Source	Rating
All About Jazz	4.5/5 stars
AllMusic	4.5/5 stars
The Guardian	4/5 stars
Jazzwise	4/5 stars
Tom Hull	B+

Selwyn Harris of Jazzwise wrote, "As with the previous Where Are We, regardless of the diverse subgenre-mix or format, Redman is playing his best self these days." Matt Collar of AllMusic stated, "While it doesn't feel like Redman is looking to completely redefine his sound here, he sounds engaged and encouraged to explore new sonic areas. He's never been one to sit still creatively, and his work on Words Fall Short speaks to his ability to both draw from his idols and from his quartet while pushing himself beyond his comfort zone." John Fordham of The Guardian added, "The result is an album that feels more like an ideal balance of Redman’s own ingenuity and his ensemble rapport."

== Track listing ==
All tracks are written by Joshua Redman.

No.	Title	Guest artist	Length
1.	"A Message to Unsend"		5:07
2.	"So It Goes"	Melissa Aldana	6:59
3.	"Words Fall Short"		4:48
4.	"Borrowed Eyes"		5:51
5.	"Icarus"	Skylar Tang	6:24
6.	"Over the Jelly-Green Sea"		4:44
7.	"She Knows"		5:20
8.	"Era's End"	Gabrielle Cavassa	6:12
Total length:			45:29

== Personnel ==
- Joshua Redman – saxophone
- Paul Cornish – piano
- Philip Norris – bass
- Nazir Ebo – drums
- Gabrielle Cavassa – vocals (8)
- Melissa Aldana – saxophone (2)
- Skylar Tang – trumpet (5)

== Charts ==
Weekly chart performance for Words Fall Short
Chart (2025)	Peak position
Croatian International Albums (HDU)	28
