= Wolfgang Muthspiel =

Austrian jazz guitarist

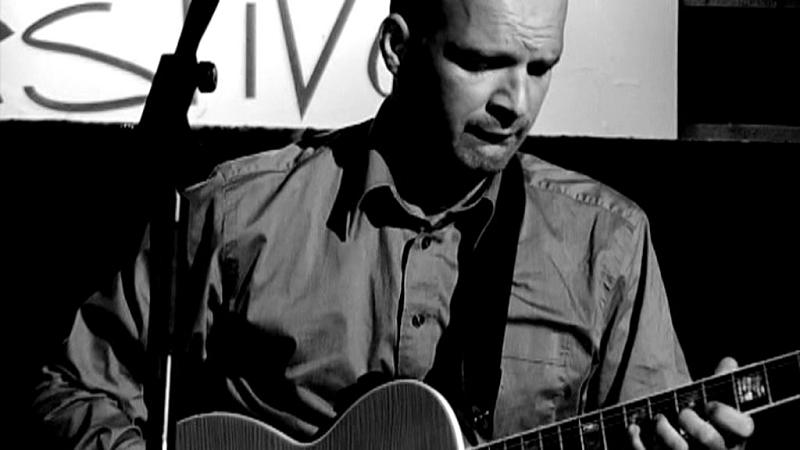
- Muthspiel at INNtöne Jazzfestival, 2006

Background information
- Born: 2 March 1965; Judenburg, Austria
- Genres: Jazz, contemporary classical
- Occupations: Musician, composer
- Instrument: Guitar
- Years active: 1985–present
- Labels: Polygram, Material, ECM
- Formerly of: Quintron
- Website: www.materialrecords.com

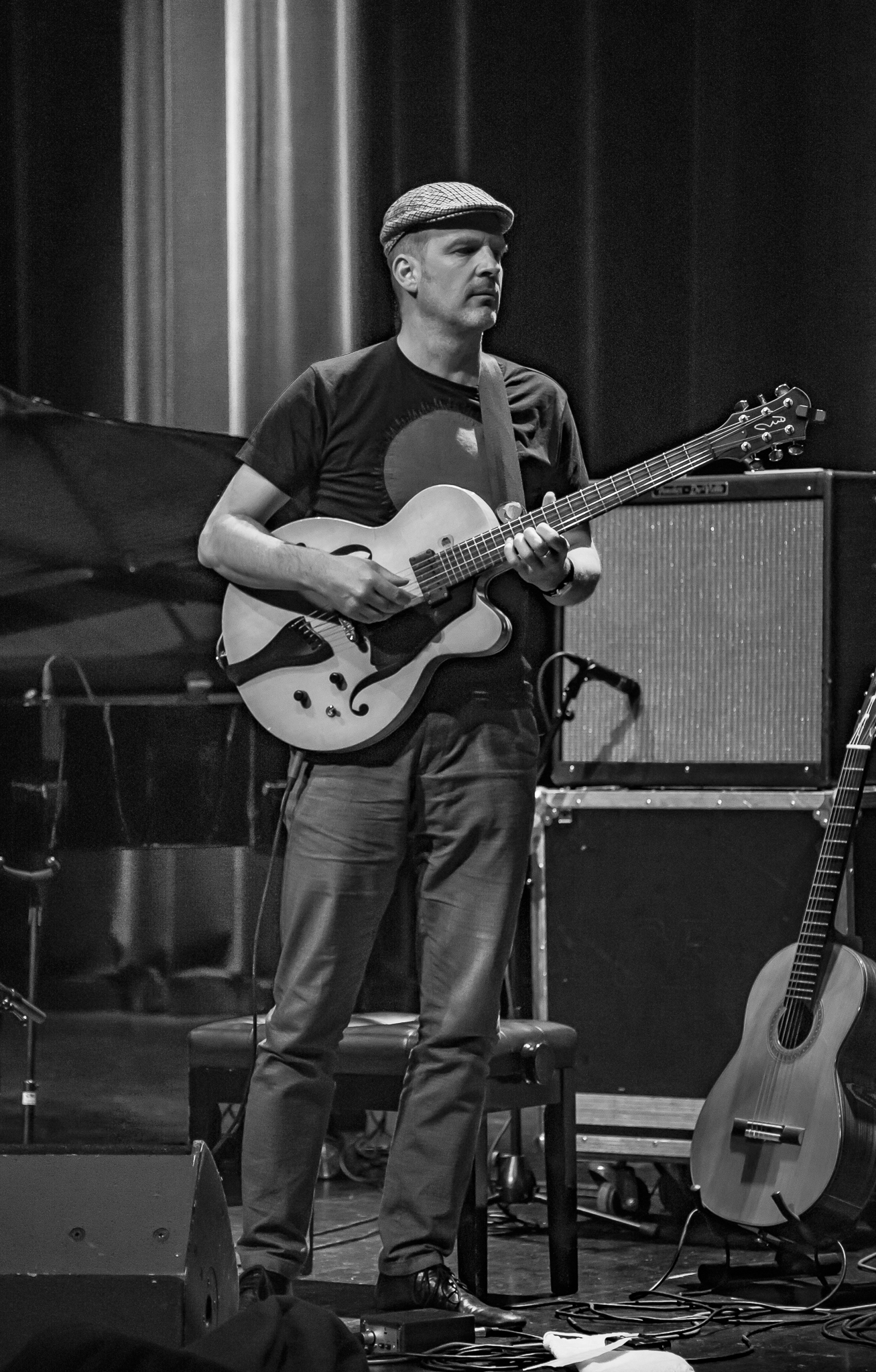
Wolfgang Muthspiel at Norwegian Music Festival, Canal Street, 2015

Wolfgang Muthspiel (born 2 March 1965) is an Austrian jazz guitarist and record label owner. He is the brother of musician Christian Muthspiel.

== Music career ==
When he was six, he began playing violin, and at fourteen he moved on to classical guitar. He went to the Berklee College of Music on a scholarship. Beginning in 1985, he recorded three albums with his brother Christian. He released his first solo album, Timezones, in 1989. For two years, he toured with Gary Burton and guitarist Mick Goodrick, one of his teachers at Berklee.

During the 1990s, Muthspiel lived in New York City and recorded more solo albums. His sidemen included Don Alias, Larry Grenadier, Tom Harrell, and Kenny Wollesen. He appeared as a guest on albums by Patricia Barber, Marc Johnson, Paul Motian, and Gary Peacock. He was the given the award for Austrian Jazz Musician of the Year in 1997. He founded his own label, Material Records, in 2000, and recorded again with his brother Christian and with Norwegian singer Rebekka Bakken.

He formed the MGT trio with Slava Grigoryan and Ralph Towner, another trio with Larry Grenadier and Brian Blade, and one with Brad Mehldau and Ambrose Akinmusire.

He has composed for the Austrian Esterházy Foundation, the Austrian Ministry of Arts, Benjamin Schmid, the Hugo Wolf Quartet, and the Klangforum Wien.

== Discography ==
=== As leader ===
- Timezones (Amadeo, 1989)
- The Promise (Amadeo, 1990)
- Black & Blue (Amadeo, 1992)
- In & Out (Amadeo, 1993)
- Loaded Like New (Amadeo, 1995)
- Perspective (Amadeo, 1996)
- Real Book Stories (Quinton, 2001)
- Bearing Fruit (Material, 2003)
- Steinhaus (Material, 2003)
- Solo (Material, 2004)
- Air, Love & Vitamins (Quinton, 2004)
- Bright Side (Material, 2005)
- Friendly Travelers (Material, 2006)
- Friendly Travelers Live (Material, 2008)
- Earth Mountain (Material, 2008)
- From a Dream (Which Way Music, 2008)
- Live at the Jazz Standard (Material, 2010)
- Drumfree (Material, 2011)
- Vienna Naked (Material, 2012)
- Driftwood (ECM, 2014)
- Rising Grace (ECM, 2016)
- Where the River Goes (ECM, 2018)
- Angular Blues (ECM, 2020)
- Dance of the Elders (ECM, 2023)
- Etudes, Quietudes (Clap Your Hands, 2024)
- Tokyo (ECM, 2025)
- Wolfgang Muthspiel Chamber Trio, Atlas (CYH, 2026)

=== As sideman ===
With Christian Muthspiel

- Muthspiel/Peacock/Muthspiel/Motian (Amadeo, 1993)
- CY (Lotus, 1998)
- Play Parts of a Shattered Love Story (Lotus, 1999)
- Echoes of Techno (Material, 2001)

With Vienna Art Orchestra

- American Rhapsody (RCA Victor, 1998)
- Duke Ellington's Sound of Love (TCB, 1999)
- Artistry in Rhythm: A European Suite (TCB, 2000)

With others

- L'Arpeggiata & Christina Pluhar, Music for a While (Erato/Warner, 2014)
- Rebekka Bakken, Daily Mirror (Material, 2000)
- Rebekka Bakken, Beloved (Material, 2002)
- Patricia Barber, A Distortion of Love (Antilles, 1992)
- Gary Burton, Cool Nights (GRP, 1991)
- Corin Curschellas, Goodbye Gary Cooper (Make Up, 1999)
- Aydin Esen, Dialogo (Material, 2005)
- Gil Goldstein, Zebracoast (EAU, 1992)
- Gabrielle Goodman, Travelin' Light (JMT, 1993)
- Gabrielle Goodman, Until We Love (JMT, 1994)
- Mick Goodrick, In the Same Breath (CMP, 1996)
- Mike Holober, Canyon (Sons of Sound, 2003)
- Mike Holober, Wish List (Sons of Sound, 2006)
- Dieter Ilg, Folk Songs (Jazzline, 1997)
- Dieter Ilg, Fieldwork (Jazzline, 1998)
- Marc Johnson, Magic Labyrinth (JMT, 1995)
- Paul Motian, Reincarnation of a Love Bird (JMT, 1994)
- Ralph Towner, Travel Guide (ECM, 2013)
- Dhafer Youssef, Electric Sufi (Enja, 2001)
