= In Tense =

Studio album by Harish Raghavan
- Released: July 29, 2022
- Recorded: December 10–11, 2021
- Studio: GSI Studios
- Genre: Jazz
- Length: 33:28
- Label: Whirlwind Recordings
- Producer: Harish Raghavan

Harish Raghavan chronology
Calls for Action (2019)	In Tense (2022)

In Tense is a 2022 studio album by Harish Raghavan released through Whirlwind Recordings. Its compositions were written during the COVID-19 pandemic.

== Critical reception ==
Professional ratings
Review scores
Source	Rating
AllMusic	4.5/5 stars
DownBeat	4/5 stars

Timothy Monger, writing for AllMusic, praised the album in a 4.5 star review, stating that "...In Tense is an altogether heavier record, with a reassuring earthbound heft and a number of sturdy low motifs that anchor its floor plan...It was a period of global separateness and fear to the extent that, when these five souls came together in a room, a palpable sense of both relief and heightened intensity spilled into the proceedings." Howard Mandel gave the album four stars in DownBeat magazine, and described the tracks on the album as "richly orchestrated for drama and lyricism, often using repetition, timbre distinctions, and their affinities and dynamic nuances to underscore and frame individual or dueting players’ efforts."

== Track listing ==
All tracks written by Harish Raghavan

1. AMA – 06:16
2. Circus Music – 04:24
3. In Tense – 06:07
4. Eight-Thirteen – 06:13
5. S2020 – 04:38
6. Prayer – 05:50

== Personnel ==
- Harish Raghavan - double bass
- Eric Harland - drums
- Charles Altura - guitar
- Joel Ross - vibraphone/marimba
- Morgan Guerin - tenor saxophone, electric wind instrument, bass clarinet
