= Where the River Goes =

Studio album by Wolfgang Muthspiel
- Released: October 5, 2018
- Recorded: February 2018
- Studio: Studios La Buissonne, Pernes-les-Fontaines
- Genre: Jazz
- Label: ECM

Wolfgang Muthspiel chronology
Rising Grace (2016)	Where the River Goes (2018)

Where the River Goes is an album by guitarist Wolfgang Muthspiel. It was recorded in 2018 and released by ECM Records later that year.

== Background ==
Guitarist Wolfgang Muthspiel's first album for ECM Records was Driftwood in 2014, a trio recording with bassist Larry Grenadier and drummer Brian Blade. For the following Rising Grace, trumpeter Ambrose Akinmusire and pianist Brad Mehldau were added. For Where the River Goes, Eric Harland replaced Blade on drums in the quintet.

== Music and recording ==
The album was recorded in February 2018, at the same studio used for Rising Grace. Six of the eight tracks are Muthspiel compositions; Mehldau contributed "Blueshead".

== Release and reception ==
Professional ratings
Review scores
Source	Rating
AllMusic	4/5 stars
Down Beat	4/5 stars

Where the River Goes was released by ECM on October 5, 2018. The AllMusic reviewer wrote: "Where the River Goes is more speculative than its predecessor, but it's so kinetic in its group engagement, it doesn't feel that way. Its seemingly effortless conversation sets a new bar for this group going forward."

== Track listing ==
1. "Where the River Goes"
2. "For Django"
3. "Descendants"
4. "Clearing"
5. "Buenos Aires"
6. "One Day My Prince Was Gone"
7. "Blueshead"
8. "Panorama"

== Personnel ==
- Wolfgang Muthspiel – guitar
- Ambrose Akinmusire – trumpet
- Brad Mehldau – piano
- Larry Grenadier – bass
- Eric Harland – drums
