= Ones & Twos =

2025 studio album by Gerald Clayton

Studio album by Gerald Clayton
- Released: April 11, 2025
- Genre: Jazz
- Length: 44:32
- Labels: Blue Note: 7547258 LP; 7547255 CD

Gerald Clayton chronology
Bells On Sand (2022)	Ones & Twos (2025)

Ones & Twos: Expanded Edition

Ones & Twos is a studio album by American jazz pianist Gerald Clayton, released on April 11, 2025, his third album on the Blue Note label.

== Reception ==
Professional ratings
Review scores
Source	Rating
AllMusic	4.5/5 stars

Matt Collar, writing for AllMusic, said, "Clayton's sonically textural compositions... find him drawing upon a cohesive blend of modal post-bop, modern classical, soul, and Afro-Latin sounds. [...] While the DJ-spinning concept works nicely, the album also flows just as well from start to finish."

Selwyn Harris of Jazzwise wrote, "Clayton's beguiling themes are full of elegant twists and turns while the combo of performances, arrangements and production draw in the listener at a deeper level."

== Track listing ==
All tracks are written by Gerald Clayton.

No.	Title	Length
1.	"Angels Speak"	3:55
2.	"Cinnamon Sugar"	4:15
3.	"Sacrifice Culture"	2:35
4.	"How Much Love?"	3:44
5.	"Count M"	2:25
6.	"Just Above"	5:22
7.	"Lovingly"	3:55
8.	"Rush"	4:15
9.	"For Peace"	2:35
10.	"More Always"	3:44
11.	"Space Seas"	2:25
12.	"Endless Tubes"	5:22
Total length:		44:32

== Personnel ==
- Gerald Clayton – piano, Rhodes piano, organ, synths, vocals
- Joel Ross – vibraphone
- Elena Pinderhughes – flute
- Marquis Hill – trumpet
- Kendrick Scott – drums
- Kassa Overall – percussion, post-production

== Ones & Twos: Expanded Edition ==
Ones & Twos: Expanded Edition

Studio album by Gerald Clayton
- Released: May 30, 2025
- Genre: Jazz
- Length: 81:51
- Label: Blue Note

Clayton released Ones & Twos: Expanded Edition digitally on May 30, 2025, a culmination of his Ones & Twos project. The expanded edition features two bonus tracks—"Glass Half Warm" and "Glass Half Cool"—plus a second disc comprising the tracks combined and overlayed.

=== Track listing ===
All tracks are written by Gerald Clayton.

Disc one
No.	Title	Length
1.	"Angels Speak"	3:55
2.	"Cinnamon Sugar"	4:15
3.	"Sacrifice Culture"	2:35
4.	"How Much Love?"	3:44
5.	"Count M"	2:25
6.	"Glass Half Warm"	5:01
7.	"Just Above"	5:22
8.	"Lovingly"	3:55
9.	"Rush"	4:15
10.	"For Peace"	2:35
11.	"More Always"	3:44
12.	"Space Seas"	2:25
13.	"Glass Half Cool"	5:01
14.	"Endless Tubes"	5:22
Total length:		54:34

Disc two
No.	Title	Length
1.	"Angels Speak / Lovingly"	3:55
2.	"Cinnamon Sugar / Rush"	4:15
3.	"Sacrifice Culture / For Peace"	2:35
4.	"How Much Love? / More Always"	3:44
5.	"Count M / Space Seas"	2:25
6.	"Glass Half Warm / Glass Half Cool"	5:01
7.	"Just Above / Endless Tubes"	5:22
Total length:		27:17 81:51
