= Two-Shade =

Studio album by Gerald Clayton
- Released: July 1, 2009
- Genre: Jazz
- Length: 68:27
- Label: ArtistShare

Gerald Clayton chronology
Two-Shade (2009)	Bond: The Paris Sessions (2011)

Two-Shade is a studio album by American jazz pianist Gerald Clayton, featuring a jazz trio comprising long-time friends and collaborators Joe Sanders on double bass and Justin Brown on drums. His discographic debut as a leader, the project was fan-funded and released by the ArtistShare label on July 1, 2009.

== Concept ==
In an interview with Nextbop, Clayton explained that the album's musical concept is "about taking two opposite ideas and putting them together in order to create a new sound... [featuring] jazz, some hip hop and a lot of improvisation." However, he prefaced, "people become close minded towards music that they've never even listened to, because it's classified under a certain genre".

== Reception ==
Professional ratings
Review scores
Source	Rating
All About Jazz	4/5 stars
AllMusic	4/5 stars
The Guardian	4/5 stars

According to All About Jazz, "Clayton has not only learned from the great Jazz masters before him but he embodies [their] spirit and the language", with the review characterizing the results as "not only stunning but fresh, original and distinctly the music of today". A review by Ben Ratliff for The New York Times, found it a "wide-ranging, self-confident album, and a fluent, bobbing-and-weaving relationship with the bassist... and the drummer". Additionally, Michael Nastos of AllMusic wrote, "There's a lyrical and ethereal approach to all of the selections – elusive, lithe, quicksilver, Zen-like, very articulate, and always intriguing to the point where it tempts, pull you in, and envelops your soul."

A 90% rating was awarded by specialist website Jazz.com for this "must-hear debut release" on which "Clayton's apparent skills as a composer foreshadow the impact that he will have on jazz in the years to come". JazzWeek Radio, which determines national airplay for the top-fifty jazz and smooth-jazz recordings in the US and Canada, listed Two-Shade as 12th on its chart for August 10, 2009, debuting at 25th on its July 1 release.

== Track listing ==
All tracks are written by Gerald Clayton except where noted.

No.	Title	Writer(s)	Length
1.	"Boogablues"		6:05
2.	"Trapped In a Dream"		6:32
3.	"Two Heads One Pillow"		6:24
4.	"Peace for the Moment"		7:30
5.	"All of You"	Cole Porter	5:29
6.	"Love All Around" (interlude)		2:13
7.	"Casiotone Pothole"		7:16
8.	"One Two You"		6:24
9.	"Sunny Day Go"		6:44
10.	"Scrimmage"		6:33
11.	"You're Out" (interlude)		1:04
12.	"Con Alma"	Dizzy Gillespie	6:13
Total length:			68:27

== Personnel ==
- Gerald Clayton – piano
- Joe Sanders – double bass
- Justin Brown – drums
