= Owl Song =

Studio album by Ambrose Akinmusire
- Released: December 15, 2023
- Genre: Jazz; minimalist music
- Length: 42:02
- Label: Nonesuch
- Producer: Ambrose Akinmusire

Ambrose Akinmusire chronology
Beauty Is Enough (2023)	Owl Song (2023)

Owl Song is a 2023 studio album by American jazz trumpeter Ambrose Akinmusire, with Bill Frisell and Herlin Riley. It has received positive reviews from critics.

== Reception ==
Editors at AllMusic rated this album 4.5 out of 5 stars, with critic Matt Collar writing that "Akinmusire enters into a warm, intentionally spare collaboration with veteran icons guitarist Bill Frisell and drummer Herlin Riley" that blends the musicians' signature styles with an "intense intimacy [that] feels intentional". DownBeat's Frank Alkyer rated this release 5 out of 5 stars, characterizing it as "nothing short of stunning" and "one of the most interesting recordings to come along in a very long time by one of the most interesting artists of our time". Mike Hobart of Financial Times rated this release 4 out of 5 stars for the ensemble's minimalism and having "tempi [that] are unhurried, textures [that are] nuanced and melodies clearly stated, though somewhat oblique". Owl Song was the jazz album of the month in The Guardian, where John Fordham gave it 4 out of 5 stars, ending "as befits the title, Owl Song doesn’t raise its voice much, but what it quietly says is joyously vivid, even spine-tingling". Phillip Watson declared this one of the jazz albums of the year in The Irish Times, where he gave it 4.5 out of 5 stars and stated that "this triumvirate do so much with seemingly so little". Larry Blumenfeld of The Wall Street Journal called the "unlikely" trio "three musicians confident enough of their standing to resist urges to flash technique, and humble enough to listen intently to one another as they shape music along emotional lines" whose collaboration resulted in "an alluring calm throughout the album and an unrestrained flow that defies style".

== Track listing ==
All tracks are written by Ambrose Akinmusire.

1. "Owl Song 1" – 5:52
2. "Weighted Corners" – 4:24
3. "Flux Fuelings" – 5:03
4. "Owl Song 2" – 6:28
5. "Grace" – 6:26
6. "Mr. Frisell" – 3:15
7. "Mr. Riley" – 3:27
8. "Henya" – 7:07

== Personnel ==
- Ambrose Akinmusire – trumpet, production
- David Darlington – mixing, mastering
- Bill Frisell – guitar on "Owl Song 1", "Weighted Corners", "Flux Fuelings", "Owl Song 2", "Grace", "Mr. Frisell", and "Henya"
- John Gall – design
- Adam Muñoz – engineering
- Herlin Riley – drums on "Owl Song 1", "Weighted Corners", "Flux Fuelings", "Owl Song 2", "Grace", "Mr. Riley", and "Henya"

== Charts ==
Weekly chart performance for Owl Song
Chart (2024)	Peak position
Hungarian Physical Albums (MAHASZ)	19

== See also ==
- 2023 in American music
- 2023 in jazz
- List of 2023 albums
