= A Rift in Decorum =

A Rift in Decorum: Live at the Village Vanguard

Live album by Ambrose Akinmusire
- Released: June 9, 2017
- Venue: Village Vanguard, New York City, New York, U.S.
- Genre: Jazz
- Length: 1:56:30
- Label: Blue Note
- Producer: Ambrose Akinmusire

Ambrose Akinmusire chronology
The Imagined Savior is Far Easier to Paint (2014)	A Rift in Decorum: Live at the Village Vanguard (2017)	Origami Harvest (2018)

Professional ratings
Review scores
Source	Rating
AllMusic	4/5 stars
All About Jazz	4/5 stars
Jazz Forum	4.5/5 stars
Jazz Trail	B+
Jazzwise	3/5 stars
PopMatters	8/10 stars
Tom Hull	B+

A Rift in Decorum: Live at the Village Vanguard is a live double album by American jazz trumpeter Ambrose Akinmusire. The album was released on June 9, 2017 by Blue Note.

== Reception ==
Michael J. West of JazzTimes wrote: "Like many live jazz albums, A Rift in Decorum amplifies Ambrose Akinmusire's best qualities (his beautiful, penetrating trumpet sound and postbop melodies) as well as his worst (his proneness to being too hip for the room). It's hard to say which is more powerful. But given that the album stretches over two discs, Akinmusire's excesses may have the edge. Its high points are as good as anything the trumpeter has ever done."

Matt Collar of Allmusic observed: "An expansive two-disc concert album, Ambrose Akinmusire's 2017 effort, A Rift in Decorum: Live at the Village Vanguard, is a sophisticated production on par with his previous studio recordings. Rather than returning to those familiar surroundings for his fourth album, Akinmusire instead brought his quartet to the Vanguard along with a set of newly penned original compositions. It's a purposeful choice that resonates with the long history of albums recorded at the storied Greenwich Village institution, most notably John Coltrane's classic, and at the time divisive, 1962 contribution, 'Live' at the Village Vanguard. While Akinmusire has made a very different album from Coltrane's, A Rift in Decorum does find the trumpeter in a similarly challenging mood, balancing the highly introspective and cerebral nature of his studio albums with the unpredictable and often explosive nature of his live shows."

Frank Alkyer of DownBeat wrote: "It's music that sneaks into your soul because whether fiery or quiet, nothing is ever rushed by these musicians; everything is thought out and purposeful... That depth of self-reflection makes Akinmusire an amazingly effective composer—one who should be heard, studied and enjoyed."

== Track listing ==
Disc 1

All tracks are written by Ambrose Akinmusire.

No.	Title	Length
1.	"Maurice & Michael (Sorry I Didn't Say Hello)"	12:29
2.	"Response"	5:37
3.	"Moment in Between the Rest (To Curve an Ache)"	9:42
4.	"Brooklyn (ODB)"	9:45
5.	"A Song to Exale To (Diver Song)"	6:41
6.	"Purple (Intermezzo)"	2:03
7.	"Trumpet Sketch (Milky Pete)"	14:20

Disc 2

All tracks are written by Ambrose Akinmusire.

No.	Title	Length
1.	"Taymoor's World"	10:31
2.	"First Page (Shabnam's Poem)"	7:46
3.	"H.A.M.S (In the Spirit of Honesty)"	5:12
4.	"Piano Sketch (Sam Intro)"	3:31
5.	"Piano Sketch (Beyond Enclosure)"	4:48
6.	"Condor (Harish Intro)"	2:14
7.	"Condor"	5:48
8.	"Withered"	8:26
9.	"Umteyo"	7:37

== Personnel ==
- Ambrose Akinmusire – trumpet
- Sam Harris – piano
- Harish Raghavan – bass
- Justin Brown – drums

Production

- Jaeyeol Han – artwork
- Sydney Nichols – design
- Dave Darlington – mixing, mastering
- Geoffrey Countryman – recording
- Tyler McDiarmid – recording
