= Origami Harvest =

Studio album by Ambrose Akinmusire
- Released: October 12, 2018
- Recorded: February 16, 2017
- Studio: Brooklyn Recording Studio
- Genres: Jazz, avant-garde
- Length: 59:48
- Label: Blue Note B002866202
- Producer: Ambrose Akinmusire

Ambrose Akinmusire chronology
A Rift in Decorum: Live at the Village Vanguard (2017)	Origami Harvest (2018)	On the Tender Spot of Every Calloused Moment (2020)

Professional ratings
Aggregate scores
Source	Rating
Metacritic	77/100
Review scores
Source	Rating
AllMusic	4/5 stars
DownBeat	5/5 stars
Financial Times	4/5 stars
Glide Magazine	8/10
The Guardian	4/5 stars
Mojo	4/5 stars
Pitchfork	7.6/10
Tom Hull	B+

Origami Harvest is a studio album by American jazz trumpeter Ambrose Akinmusire. The album was released on October 12, 2018 by Blue Note.

== Background ==
This is Akinmusire's fourth studio album and the fifth overall as a leader. The title Origami Harvest has a certain symbolic significance. He mentioned that "Origami" refers to "the different ways black people, especially men, have to fold, whether in failure or to fit a mold", whereas "Harvest," on the other hand, refers to the repeating cycles that recreate these hierarchical structures in society. The record was commissioned for curators Judd Greenstein of Manhattan's Ecstatic Music Festival and Kate Nordstrum of St. Paul's Liquid Music Series. The release text explains that the project was initiated with Greenstein asking Akinmusire "What's the craziest idea you have?", and Akinmusire replying "I wanted to do a project about extremes and putting things that are seemingly opposite right next to each other."

Origami Harvest consists of six lengthy tracks adding up to a full hour of interplay between the classical strings of the Mivos Quartet, Akinmusire on trumpet and keyboards, Marcus Gilmore on drums, and Sam Harris on piano. The band also includes the poet and rapper Victor Vazquez, a former member of Das Racist known by his stage name Kool A.D. The songs explore such themes as a response to societal divides, the way our politics hold us emotionally hostage, and the ever-growing list of black lives ended by structural racism. The lyrics for penultimate track "Free, White and 21" consists of the names of African American people slain in recent years by members of law enforcement or the neighborhood watch. The album unites three different genres of music: small-group jazz, hip-hop, and chamber music.

== Reception ==
At Metacritic, that assigns a normalized rating out of 100 to reviews from mainstream critics, the album received an average score of 77, based on five reviews, which indicates "generally positive reviews".

John Lewis of The Guardian stated: "Origami Harvest is his most adventurous work to date... Sometimes the self-conscious collisions of free improv and composition, of high and low art, are so discordant that they are almost unlistenable. The result is a voyage through America that is both dreamlike and dystopian, exhausting but oddly compelling". Matt Collar of AllMusic added: "Origami Harvest, is an ambitious work that finds the trumpeter blending seemingly disparate elements -- including spoken word, classical chamber music, free improvisation, and hip-hop rhythms -- into a textured if often laborious mix... Origami Harvest may not work for everybody, but for those who take the time to explore the unexpected bends and folds in Akinmusire's construction, a wealth of discoveries can be found". Davis Whiteis of JazzTimes commented: "It’s become relatively common for jazz artists to incorporate elements of hip-hop into their work, but the fourth studio outing by trumpeter Ambrose Akinmusire is one of the more provocative of these mash-up projects to have emerged thus far... Vocabularies, syntaxes, and aesthetic conceits that heretofore might have been considered incompatible meld together in a true “freedom jazz dance” for a new age". Martin Johnson of The Wall Street Journal stated: "With the music on Origami Harvest, Mr Akinmusire joins a growing number of young jazz musicians who are successfully melding the string-quartet format with intimate jazz settings. David Hajdu of The Nation wrote "It brings together three distinct schools of music: small-group jazz, hip-hop, and chamber music. Akinmusire allows each of the three to work on its own terms—the jazz impulsive and complex, the hip-hop fierce and allusive, the chamber music nuanced and lyrical—and each has roughly equal weight in the music as a whole. The result is an album that sounds like nothing other than itself. If it’s not exactly ideal jazz by traditional standards, it’s the jazz ideal carried triumphantly into 2018".

Los Angeles Times included Origami Harvest in its list of best 2018 jazz albums as #1.

== Track listing ==
Origami Harvest track listing
No.	Title	Writer(s)	Length
1.	"A Blooming Bloodfruit in a Hoodie"	Akinmusire	12:57
2.	"Miracle and Streetfight"	Akinmusire, Victor Vásquez	15:05
3.	"Americana / The Garden Waits for You to Match Her Wilderness"	Akinmusire, Victor Vásquez	10:40
4.	"Particle / Spectra"	Akinmusire, Terrard Robinson, LmbrJck_t	8:04
5.	"Free, White and 21"	Akinmusire	3:06
6.	"The Lingering Velocity of the Dead's Ambitions"	Akinmusire	9:54
Total length:			59:48

== Personnel ==
- Ambrose Akinmusire – trumpet, keyboards, whistle, words
- Kool A.D. – vocals
- LmbrJck_t – vocals (track 4)
- MIVOS Quartet – strings
  - Olivia De Prato – violin
  - Joshua Modney – violin
  - Victor Lowrie – viola
  - Isabel Castellvi – cello
- Walter Smith III – saxophone (track 2)
- Sam Harris – piano, keyboards
- Michael Aaberg – keyboards
- Marcus Gilmore – drums, computer
