= Bells On Sand =

Studio album by Gerald Clayton
- Released: April 1, 2022
- Studio: Sam First, Los Angeles; Santa Barbara Sound Design, California
- Length: 43:01
- Label: Blue Note

Gerald Clayton chronology
Happening: Live at the Village Vanguard (2020)	Bells On Sand (2022)	Ones & Twos (2025)

Bells On Sand is a studio album by American jazz pianist Gerald Clayton, released on April 1, 2022, his second for the Blue Note label.

== Critical reception ==
Professional ratings
Review scores
Source	Rating
All About Jazz	4/5 stars
AllMusic	4.5/5 stars
DownBeat	4.5/5 stars
Jazzwise	3/5 stars

Matt Collar of AllMusic wrote, "Clayton conjures a richly soulful and dreamlike atmosphere... crafting songs that straddle the line between classical chamber music and flowing modal post-bop. [...] There's a spiritual, imagistic quality to much of the album that has the feel of a '70s ECM recording."

John Fordham, for Jazzwise, described the album as "a smoothly romantic choice that might not endear itself to the jazz hardcore, but will undoubtedly make plenty of friends elsewhere".

== Track listing ==
All tracks are written by Gerald Clayton except where noted.

No.	Title	Writer(s)	Length
1.	"Water's Edge" (featuring John Clayton & Justin Brown)		6:39
2.	"Elegia"	Federico Mompou	1:17
3.	"Damunt de tu Només les Flors" (featuring John Clayton, Justin Brown & Maro)	Mompou	3:50
4.	"My Ideal 1"	Richard Whiting; Newell Chase; Leo Robin	3:39
5.	"That Roy" (featuring Justin Brown)		2:16
6.	"Rip" (featuring Justin Brown)		3:07
7.	"Just a Dream" (featuring Maro)		5:29
8.	"My Ideal 2"	Whiting; Chase; Robin	5:25
9.	"Peace Invocation" (featuring Charles Lloyd)		8:00
10.	"There Is Music Where You're Going My Friends"	Jeff Clayton	3:19
Total length:			43:01

== Personnel ==
- Gerald Clayton – piano, Rhodes piano, organ, vibraphone
- John Clayton – double bass (1, 2, 3)
- Charles Lloyd – tenor saxophone (9)
- Maro – vocals (3, 7)
- Justin Brown – drums (1, 3, 5, 6)
