= Prelude... to Cora =

Studio album by Ambrose Akinmusire
- Released: April 21, 2008
- Recorded: 2007 in Brooklyn, New York City.
- Genre: Jazz
- Length: 1:00:55
- Label: Fresh Sound New Talent
- Producer: Ambrose Akinmusire

Ambrose Akinmusire chronology
Prelude... to Cora (2008)	When the Heart Emerges Glistening (2011)

Professional ratings
Review scores
Source	Rating
All About Jazz	4/5 stars
Tom Hull	B+

Prelude... to Cora is the debut studio album by American jazz trumpeter Ambrose Akinmusire. It was released by Fresh Sound New Talent. Akinmusire composed all but three tracks, including jazz standard "Stablemates" by saxophonist Benny Golson. The album is dedicated to Akinmusire's mother, Cora.

== Reception ==
John Barron of All About Jazz stated: "On Prelude: to Cora, trumpeter Ambrose Akinmusire offers a wide-open musical perspective, inviting a wealth of influences to shape a personalized approach to improvisation and composition. Akinmusire seems content with allowing the music to fall where it may; eschewing trends and any pre-conceived notions about what is expected from a debut recording."

== Track listing ==
All tracks are written by Ambrose Akinmusire except where noted.

No.	Title	Length
1.	"Dreams of the Manbahsniese"	7:38
2.	"Vibe Solo/Intro"	1:05
3.	"Aroca"	8:46
4.	"Humsong"	6:04
5.	"M.I.S.T.A.G."	5:23
6.	"Trumpet Intro/Dedication to Ruby"	2:21
7.	"Ruby"	9:27
8.	"Trapped in a Dream" (Aaron Parks)	5:36
9.	"Dingmandingo" (Walter Smith III)	9:18
10.	"Stablemates" (Benny Golson)	5:17
Total length:		1:00:55

== Personnel ==
- Ambrose Akinmusire – trumpet
- Walter Smith III – tenor saxophone
- Aaron Parks – piano
- Chris Dingman – vibraphone
- Joe Sanders– bass
- Justin Brown – drums

Guests

- Junko Watanabe – vocals (tracks: 1 5 7)
- Logan Richardson – alto sax (tracks: 5 9)

Production

- Andy Taub – engineer
- Dave Darlington – mastering, mixing
- Alicia Vergel De Dios – artwork, design
- Jordi Pujol – executive producer
