= Rising Grace =

Studio album by Wolfgang Muthspiel
- Released: 28 October 2016
- Recorded: January 2016
- Studio: Studios la Buissonne; Pernes-les-Fontaines
- Genre: Jazz
- Length: 1:08:33
- Label: ECM 2515
- Producer: Manfred Eicher

Wolfgang Muthspiel chronology
Vienna, World (2015)	Rising Grace (2016)	Where the River Goes (2018)

Rising Grace is a studio album by guitarist Wolfgang Muthspiel, recorded in January 2016 and released by ECM in October that year. His quintet contained trumpeter Ambrose Akinmusire, pianist Brad Mehldau, bassist Larry Grenadier, and drummer Brian Blade.

== Background ==
Muthspiel's first album for ECM was Driftwood in 2014, a trio recording with bassist Larry Grenadier and drummer Brian Blade. For Rising Grace, trumpeter Ambrose Akinmusire and pianist Brad Mehldau were added.

== Music and recording ==
Muthspiel wrote all of the tracks, except for "Wolfgang's Waltz", which was composed by Mehldau. The recordings were made over three days in south-eastern France.

The music does not follow the typical rhythm section plus soloists division, and "while some songs feature a conventional sequence of soloists, it's also common for Muthspiel, Akinmusire and Mehldau to share the soloing space as they weave melodies together."

The album was released by ECM on CD and two LPs on 28 October 2016.

== Reception ==
Professional ratings
Review scores
Source	Rating
All About Jazz	4.5/5 stars
AllMusic	4/5 stars
Down Beat	5/5 stars
The Guardian	4/5 stars
Jazz Forum	5/5 stars
Musica Jazz	5/5 stars
Rondo	5/5 stars
RTÉ	4/5 stars
The Times	3/5 stars

Critic John Fordham suggested that "the music mingles echoes of Kenny Wheeler, the classical guitar sound of Ralph Towner and the songlike one of Pat Metheny, plus the quickwittedness of the mid-60s Miles Davis group". The Ottawa Citizen reviewer wrote: "Sonically ravishing and filled with profound, singular music that speaks beautifully of communion, Rising Grace will reward your full attention, over and over."

== Track listing ==
All tracks are written by Wolfgang Muthspiel, except where noted

No.	Title	Writer(s)	Length
1.	"Rising Grace"		5:56
2.	"Intensive Care""		10:17
3.	"Triad Song"		8:04
4.	"Father and Sun"		8:14
5.	"Wolfgang's Waltz"	Brad Mehldau	8:01
6.	"Superonny"		6:44
7.	"Boogaloo"		7:33
8.	"Den Wheeler, Den Kenny"		7:50
9.	"Ending Music"		1:23
10.	"Oak"		4:34

== Personnel ==
- Wolfgang Muthspiel – guitar
- Ambrose Akinmusire – trumpet
- Brad Mehldau – piano
- Larry Grenadier – double bass
- Brian Blade – drums
