= Jazz Baltica 2009 =

The theme for Jazz Baltica 2009 was "Big Band Battle".

== Bands and events ==
Event/Band	Participants/Musicians
Gabriel Coburger Band – Quintet Jean-Paul	Gabriel Coburger, Ken Norris, Matthäus Winnitzki, Sven Kerschek, Derek Scherzer
Opening Session with the JazzBaltica Ensemble and Nils Landgren (special guest)	Joakim Milder, Johannes Enders, Niels Lyhne Løkkegaard, Axel Schlosser, Karin Hammar, Christopher Dell, Michael Wollny, Martin Wind, Andi Haberl
"70 Years Blue Note Records" – Roundtable discussion	Rainer Haarmann, Moderator, Rainer Placke, Jazzprezzo, Ashley Kahn, Jimmy Katz, Sarah Seidel, Fred Cohen
China Moses "This One's for Dinah"	China Moses, Daniel Huck, Raphael Lemonnier, Fabien Marcoz, Jean-Pierre Derouard
Karin Hammar Quartet	Karin Hammar, Jonas Östholm, Tony Overwater, Anders Kjellberg
JazzBaltica Ensemble "Treasures - Remembering Esbjörn" directed by Joakim Milder	Joakim Milder, Johannes Enders, Niels Lyhne Løkkegaard, Axel Schlosser, Karin Hammar, Christopher Dell, Michael Wollny, Martin Wind, Andi Haberl
Joe Locke Force of Four	Joe Locke, Robert Rodriguez, Ricardo Rodriguez, Johnathan Blake
Jazz Bigband Graz "Electric Poetry & Lo-Fi Cookies"	Horst-Michael Schaffer, Bernhard Nolf, Axel Mayer, David Jarh, Reinhard Summerer, Robert Bachner, Philip Yaeger, Wolfgang Tischhart, Heinrich von Kalnein, Robert Friedl, Johannes Enders, Herb Berger, Martin Harms, Uli Rennert, Oliver Kent, Henning Sieverts, Gregor Hilbe, special guest Barbara Buchholz
Mayra Andrade	Mayra Andrade, Munir Hossn, Mathias Duplessy, Etienne Mbappe, Fabrice Thompson, Zé Luis Nascimento
Arne Jansen Trio	Arne Jansen, Eva Kruse, Eric Schaefer
Karin Hammar Quartet with Mike Rodriguez	Karin Hammar, Jonas Östholm, Tony Overwater, Anders Kjellberg, Mike Rodriguez
Sinne Eeg	Sinne Eeg, Lars Jansson, Mads Vinding, Morten Lund
Gabriel Coburger – Quintet Jean-Paul	Gabriel Coburger, Ken Norris, Matthäus Winnitzki, Sven Kerschek, Derek Scherzer
Steve Swallow & Bohuslän Big Band "Swallow Songs"	Steve Swallow, Lennart Grahn, Samuel Olsson, Jan Eliasson, Karin Hammar, Björn Samuelsson, Christer Olofsson, Ralph Soovik, Niclas Rydh, Johan Borgström, Joakim Rolandsson, Ove Ingemarsson, Mikael Karlsson, Alberto Pinton, Tommy Kotter, Yasuhito Mori, Göran Kroon,
Joachim Kuhn & Michael Wollny	Michael Wollny, Joachim Kuhn
Claudia Quintet feat. John Hollenbeck	John Hollenbeck, Matt Moran, Ted Reichman, Chris Speed, Drew Gress
NDR Big Band directed by Maria Schneider	Maria Schneider, Thorsten Benkenstein, Ingolf Burkhardt, Claus Stötter, Reiner Winterschladen, Dan Gottshall, Klaus Heidenreich, Stefan Lottermann, Ingo Lahme, Fiete Felsch, Peter Bolte, Cristof Lauer, Lutz Büchner, Frank Delle, Stefan Diez, Vladislav Sendecki, James Genus, Gary Husband, Marcio Doctor
Ida Sand	Ida Sand, Ola Gustafsson, Anders Hedlund, Peter Forss
Percussion discussion – Maurice Chestnut & Joe Locke and others	Maurice Chestnut, tap dance, Joe Locke, Nils Wülker, Martin Wind, Johnathan Blake, Daniel Sadownick
max.bab	Max von Mosch, Benedikt Jahnel, Benny Schäfer, Andi Haberl
The Rodriguez Brothers "Conversations"	Robert Rodriguez Michael Rodriguez Ricardo Rodriguez Ernesto Simpson
Don Friedman "The Composer"	Don Friedman, Martin Wind, Joe LaBarbera, Rich Shemaria, Gerður Gunnarsdóttir, Elfa Run Kristinsdóttir, Martin Stupka, Stephan Braun,
Nasheet Waits Equality feat. Stanley Cowell	Nasheet Waits, Stanley Cowell, Tarus Mateen, Logan Richardson,
Peter Liljeqvist "Like Papillon"	Peter Liljeqvist, Maike Koch, Eric Schaefer,
SOAP feat. Magnum Coltrane Price	Magnum Coltrane Price, Lars Dieterich, Peter Liljeqvist, Eva Kruse, Hendrik Stiller, Hannes Dullinger,
Hank Jones The New York Trio, special guest James Moody	Hank Jones, George Mraz, Willie Jones III, special guest James Moody
Andromeda Mega Express Orchestra	Daniel Glatzel, Oliver Roth, Laure Mourot, Sebastian Hägele, Johannes Schleiermacher, Aki Sebastian Ruhl, Magnus Schriefl, Gerhard Gschlössl, Karl Ivar Refseth, Andi Haberl, Anna Viechtl, Kalle Zeier, Andi Waelti, Matthew Lonson, Josa Gerhard, Mokkapan Phongphit, Magdalena Brune, Martin Stupka, Charlotte Jacke, Isabelle Klemt
Edmar Castaneda Group	Edmar Castaneda, Andrea Tierra, Marshall Gilkes, Dave Silliman
OddJob New Sounds from Sweden	Goran Kajfeš Per Ruskträsk Johansson Daniel Karlsson, Peter Forss, Janne Robertson
Vanguard Jazz Orchestra, special guest Hank Jones	Nick Marchione, Frank Greene, Terell Stafford, Scott Wendholt, John Mosca, Luis Bonilla, Jason Jackson, Douglas Purviance, Dick Oatts, Billy Drewes, Rich Perry, Ralph LaLama, Gary Smulyan, Michael Weiss, Doug Weiss, John Riley, special guest Hank Jones
Bunky Green Salzau Quartet – Celebrating Bunky Green	Bunky Green, Carsten Daerr, Eva Kruse, Nasheet Waits, special guest James Moody, special guest Donny McCaslin, special guest Miguel Zenón
Torben Waldorff Afterburn feat. Donny McCaslin	Torben Waldorff, Donny McCaslin, Maggi Olin, Matt Clohesy, Jon Wikan
Miguel Zenon Quartet	Miguel Zenon, Luis Perdomo, Hans Glawischnig, Henry Cole
