= Gabrielle Cavassa =

American jazz singer (born 1994)

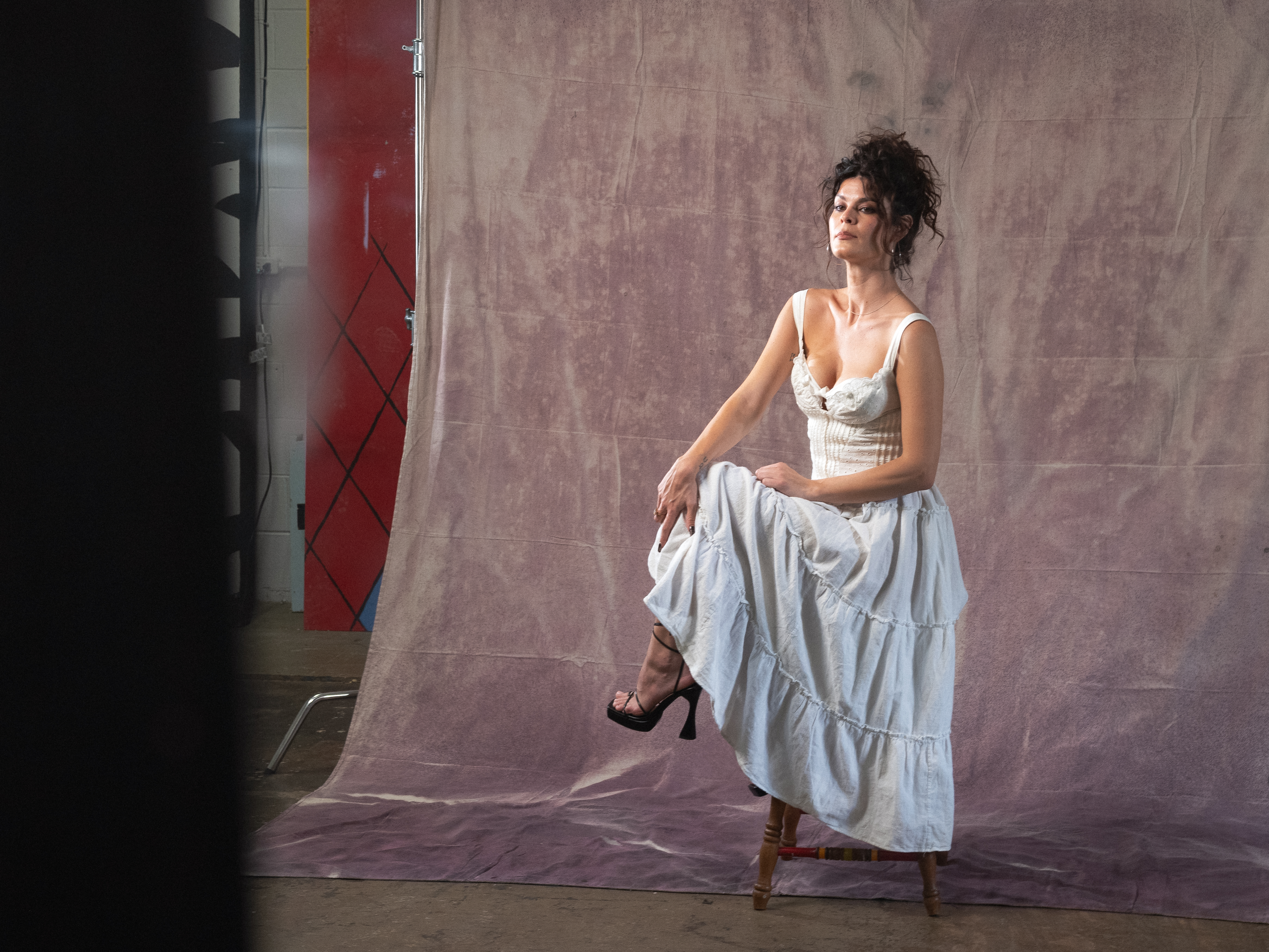
- Cavassa in 2024

Background information
- Born: July 5, 1994 (age 32); Escondido, California, U.S.
- Genre: Jazz
- Occupation: Singer-songwriter
- Years active: 2018–present
- Label: Blue Note
- Education: San Francisco State University
- Website: gabriellecavassa.com

Gabrielle Cavassa (born July 5, 1994) is an American jazz vocalist.

== Life and career ==
Cavassa was born and raised in Escondido, California, and is of Italian descent. She graduated with a Bachelor of Arts in Music from San Francisco State University. In 2012, she was a contestant on the 11th season of American Idol, where she performed in the Hollywood rounds before being eliminated.

In 2017, Cavassa moved to New Orleans, integrating herself into the city's music scene. She soon toured with Adonis Rose and the New Orleans Jazz Orchestra, trumpeter Irvin Mayfield, and collaborated with drummer/singer Jamison Ross, who would co-produce her debut album.

After releasing her self-titled debut album, Cavassa won the Sarah Vaughan International Jazz Vocal Competition at the James Moody Jazz Festival in 2021. Her first, self-titled album was released and self-published on August 21, 2020. Cavassa cites Billie Holiday, Phyllis Hyman, Ornella Vanoni, and Jeff Buckley as musical influences.

Cavassa performed on Where Are We, a 2023 studio album by jazz saxophonist Joshua Redman and his first to feature vocals. She appeared on Redman's subsequent 2025 album, Words Fall Short, on the track titled "Era's End".

In August, 2024, Cavassa signed to Blue Note Records, and entered the studio to record her label debut.

== Discography ==
Cavassa performing with Joshua Redman's quartet at The Sheldon in 2024

=== Albums ===
- Gabrielle Cavassa (self-released, 2020)
- Diavola (Blue Note, 2026)

=== Singles ===
- Inside My Arms (self-released, 2020)

=== Appearances ===
- Ryan Hanseler, Live at Snug (independent, 2021)
- Calvin Martin, Lovesongs (2022)
- Al Strong and Sullivan Fortner, Love Stronger (Al Strong Music / Lightyear, 2022)
- Strivers' Row, Aaron Green, and Dion Kerr; A Sneaky Link Love Song (Strivers' Row Productions, 2022)
- Michelle Welchons, Anna Moss, and Sabine McCalla; Flickering Lights (EP; self-released, 2023)
- Joshua Redman, Where Are We (Blue Note, 2023)
- Bria Skonberg, What It Means (Cellar Music Group, 2024)
- Joshua Redman, Words Fall Short (Blue Note, 2025)
