= Bigga Haitian =

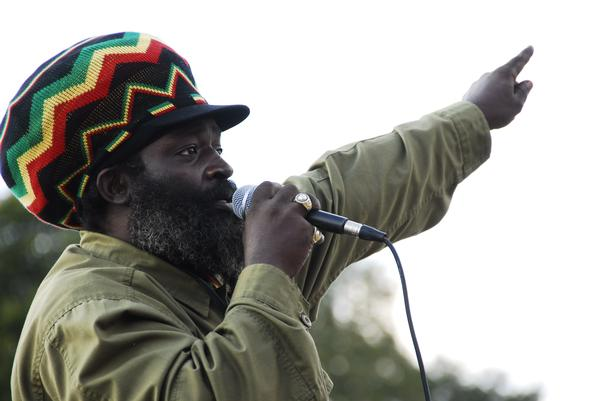
- Bigga Haitian performing at McCarren Park Pool

Background information
- Born: Charles Andre Dorismond; November 4, 1964 (age 61); Port-au-Prince, Haiti
- Origin: Flatbush, New York
- Genres: Reggae, hip hop, compas, R&B
- Occupations: Musician, singer
- Instrument: Vocals
- Years active: 1982–present
- Labels: Walkup Records, BH Records, Big Ship, RAS, Flames
- Website: www.biggahaitian.com

Charles Andre Dorismond (born November 4, 1964), better known by his stage name Bigga Haitian, is a Haitian musician and singer who rose to fame in the 1990s. He is known as "the first Haitian singer to break into the Jamaican reggae scene", tearing down national and cultural walls and paving the way for the next generation of Haitian artists. Today's most talented Haitian artists, such as Wyclef Jean and Mecca aka Grimo, credit Bigga as an influence.

== Early life ==
Born Charles Dorismond in Port-au-Prince, Haiti, Bigga hails from a musical family. His father, Andre Dorismond, was the lead singer of The Webert Sicot Group, pioneers of Haitian dance music known as compas (kompa). Bigga immigrated to New York City at the age of 8 and grew up amidst the pulsating rhythms of reggae music in the vibrant Jamaican community of Flatbush, Brooklyn. Bigga knew that he was destined to become a reggae singer after seeing Admiral Bailey perform his hit tune "Big Belly Man" at Manhattan's Reggae Lounge in 1987.

== Musical career ==
Bigga released his first single, "Haiti A Weh Mi From" (Flames Records), in 1989. The track reached #1 on the Haitian charts, and is still a staple of Haitian radio to this day. Bigga's first full album, 1997's I Am Back (Royal Productions/Jomino/Roots International), features a remix of this dancehall anthem.

In 2002, Bigga released his second album, Binghi Mon. The title track was inspired by racial profiling of Rastafarians and other groups following the terrorist attacks of September 11, 2001. Also called "The Osama Tune," the song rails against violence, denouncing the Taliban and Osama bin Laden.

Over the next few years, Bigga performed with notable reggae musicians including Shabba Ranks, Cocoa Tea and Junior Reid. Bigga's unique brand of toasting enabled him to cross over into hip-hop, opening for Lil' Kim and Jay-Z.

In 2006, Bigga signed with his current label, New York-based independent, Walkup Records. Several years earlier, Walkup co-founder Marc Lawrence had signed Bigga to a publishing deal with another company. In February 2006, Lawrence brought Bigga to Walkup's other co-founder Brett Smith's home studio to demo some new songs. Smith and Lawrence recognized the potential in the reggae veteran's material and signed him immediately. In an interview with Skope Magazine, Bigga offered high praise for his new label, "After twenty years of making reggae music, just now, I feel that I'm in the music business because of these guys' professionalism."

Later that year, Bigga's first track for Walkup, "Gi Me Da Weed" was released as a digital single to "monster downloads from iTunes, Rhapsody and eMusic" and "heavy airplay on reggae radio stations." A full album, Sak Pasé was released online in 2009 and was released on CD in early 2010.

On August 12, 2009, "King of Glory" from 2003's Binghi Mon and "London Massive" from 2009's Sak Pasé were featured in the series finale of NBC's The Philanthropist.

== Patrick Dorismond ==
Bigga's brother Patrick Dorismond was killed by members of the New York Police Department on March 16, 2000. Bigga honored the memory of his late brother with "Tribute to Patrick Dorismond" a track released as a 7" single by Jah Life Int'l Records and later included on Bigga's 2003 album, Binghi Mon. Revered reggae artist Barrington Levy donated his anthem "Murderer" to serve as the basis for the track. "Tribute" was produced by Jah Life, who also produced the original Barrington Levy recording.

== Discography ==
=== Albums ===
- 2009: Sak Pasé (Walkup Records)
- 2003: Binghi Mon (BH Records Dorismond Enterprises inc )
- 1997: I Am Back (Royal Productions/Jomino/Roots International/BH RECORDS )
- 2021: Money Time ( Blaza music Group/ dorismond enterprises inc)

=== Singles ===
- 2006: Gi Me Da Weed (Walkup Records)
- 2006: Hail Up the King (Etaste Music)
- 2003: Tribute to Patrick Dorismond (Jah Life Int'l Records)
- 1994: Red Carpet (Big Ship)
- 1994: Sexy Body (Big Ship)
- 1992: Mad Over Jah (Justice)
- 1990: Gimme Mi Country (Flames Records)
- 1989: Haiti A Weh Mi From (Flames Records)
- 2012: Jah Children Arise (dorismond Enterprises inc)
- 2012: Mama Kush (Dorismond Enterprises inc)
- 2012: Coming Home (Dorismond Enterprises inc)

=== Compilations ===
- 2009: Focus Riddim (Raw Moon/Top Tier)
- 2009: Tribe of Kings Presents: Bigga Fiyah Mix (Strictly Vibes Vol. 3) Mixed by Dash Eye and Hosted by Bigga Haitian (Tribe of Kings)
- 2008: Ragga Kreyol (Chevry Records)
- 2006: Love Roots & Culture (Gyasi)
- 1995: Best of the Best, Vol. 5 (RAS Records)
- 2012: My Best Girl (Allan Kurfew ft. Bigga Haitian)
