= When the Heart Emerges Glistening =

Studio album by Ambrose Akinmusire
- Released: April 5, 2011
- Recorded: September 20–22, 2010
- Studio: Brooklyn Studios, NYC
- Genre: Jazz
- Length: 53:37
- Label: Blue Note; 5099907061229
- Producer: Ambrose Akinmusire, Jason Moran

Ambrose Akinmusire chronology
Prelude... to Cora (2008)	When the Heart Emerges Glistening (2011)	The Imagined Savior is Far Easier to Paint (2014)

Professional ratings
Aggregate scores
Source	Rating
Metacritic	85/100
Review scores
Source	Rating
AllMusic	4/5 stars
All About Jazz	4.5/5 stars
The Daily Telegraph	4/5 stars
The Guardian	4/5 stars
Jazzwise	4/5 stars
PopMatters	9/10 stars
Tom Hull	B+

When the Heart Emerges Glistening is the second studio album by American jazz trumpeter Ambrose Akinmusire. The album was released on 5 April 2011. The album booklet includes a letter from Blue Note CEO Bruce Lundvall expressing his praises.

== Reception ==
John Fordham of The Guardian stated: "or his octave-vaulting lines and incandescent high-end tones, 28-year-old California-born trumpeter Ambrose Akinmusire suggests connections with Norwegian ambient-brass virtuoso Arve Henriksen. But this is American jazz, and the newcomer already sounds like a redefining force in that sphere. Akinmusire honed his craft with sax trailblazer Steve Coleman, and this music echoes that, and also the work of the album's producer, Jason Moran... Passages of minimally accompanied trumpet are masterpieces of patient development, as is the ensemble ballad Henya, with its deliberate, slow-blown dissonance in an otherwise mellifluous theme. Akinmusire's empathy with tenorist Smith gives an updated Miles Davis/Wayne Shorter atmosphere to jolting faster pieces such as 'Jaya', and the bass and drums pairing nails everything with steely relish."

Will Layman of PopMatters observed: "Kudos to Blue Note president Bruce Lundvall for getting Ambrose Akinmusire and his band into the studio. And kudos to pianist Jason Moran for not only suggesting this but also producing the recording (and playing Rhodes, subtly and beautifully, on a couple of tracks). When the Heart Emerges Glistening is a gem. It’s a jazz record to rave about and to push on your friends. It’s the product of a talent that should send shivers up every jazz fan’s spine. Ambrose Akinmusire has been holding back, finding his voice, developing his band, and now he is here in full bloom. Spring has arrived. You can feel it in your bones, and now you can hear it with your ears."

== Track listing ==
No.	Title	Writer(s)	Length
1.	"Confessions to My Unborn Daughter"	Akinmusire	8:35
2.	"Jaya"	Harish Raghavan	5:27
3.	"Henya Bass Intro"	Akinmusire	0:48
4.	"Henya"	Akinmusire	5:21
5.	"Far But Few Between"	Akinmusire	1:56
6.	"With Love"	Akinmusire	6:52
7.	"Regret (No More)"	Akinmusire	4:36
8.	"Ayneh (Cora)"	Akinmusire	1:09
9.	"My Name Is Oscar"	Akinmusire	3:49
10.	"The Walls of Lechuguilla"	Akinmusire	5:29
11.	"What's New?"	Johnny Burke, Bob Haggart	3:04
12.	"Tear Stained Suicide Manifesto"	Akinmusire	4:55
13.	"Ayneh (Campbell)"	Akinmusire	1:36
Total length:			53:37

== Personnel ==
- Ambrose Akinmusire – trumpet (tracks: 1 2 4 5 6 7 10 11 12 13), celesta (track: 8), voice (track: 9), producer
- Walter Smith III – tenor saxophone (tracks: 1 2 4 6 10 12)
- Gerald Clayton – piano (tracks: 1 2 4 6 7 8 10 11 13)
- Jason Moran – producer, concert grand piano (tracks: 4 12)
- Harish Raghavan – bass (tracks: 1 2 3 4 5 6 10 12)
- Justin Brown – drums (tracks: 1 2 4 5 6 9 10 12)
