= Gerald Clayton =

Jazz pianist and composer (born 1984)

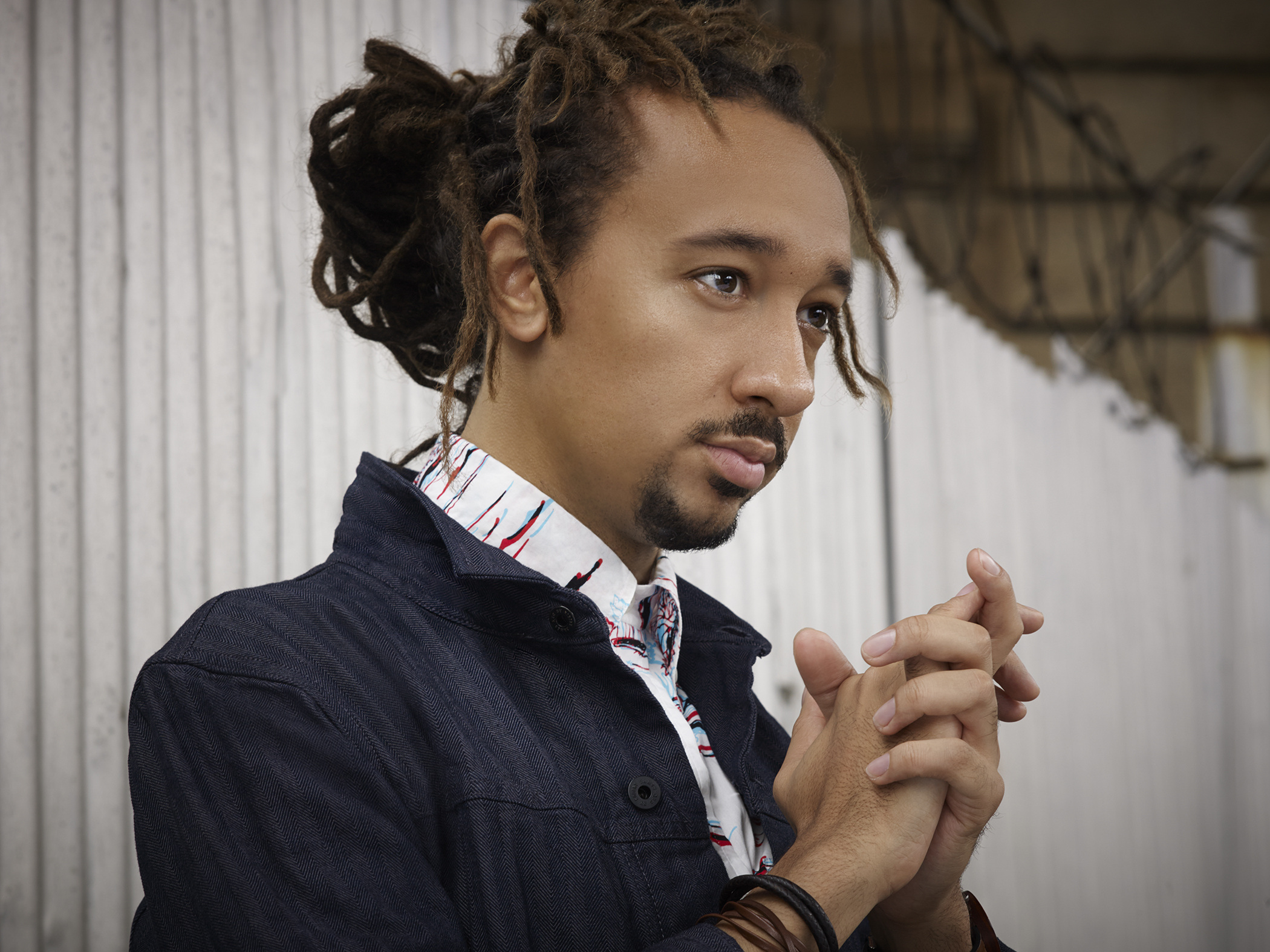

Background information
- Born: May 11, 1984 (age 42); Utrecht, Netherlands
- Origin: Los Angeles, California, United States
- Genre: Jazz
- Occupation: Musician
- Instrument: Piano
- Years active: 2003–present
- Labels: ArtistShare; EmArcy; Concord; Motéma; Verve; Blue Note
- Member of: The Clayton Brothers
- Website: www.geraldclayton.com

Gerald William Clayton (born May 11, 1984) is a Dutch-born American jazz pianist and composer.

== Biography ==
Clayton attended the Los Angeles County High School for the Arts, USC's Thornton School of Music - where he studied piano with Billy Childs, and the Manhattan School of Music - where he studied with Kenny Barron.

He has performed and recorded with Roy Hargrove, Diana Krall, Ben Wendel, Dianne Reeves, Terri Lyne Carrington, Ambrose Akinmusire, Dayna Stephens, Kendrick Scott, Ben Williams, Terell Stafford & Dick Oatts, Michael Rodriguez, Avishai Cohen, Sachal Vasandani, Gretchen Parlato, and the Clayton Brothers Quintet. Clayton has also enjoyed an extended association with saxophone legend, Charles Lloyd, both touring and recording with Lloyd since early 2013.

Clayton's work has received numerous Grammy nominations. In 2012 and 2013, he received Grammy nominations for The Paris Sessions (Concord) and Life Forum (Concord). In 2010, he was nominated for Best Instrumental Composition for "Battle Circle", which is featured on the Clayton Brothers album, New Song and Dance. In 2009, he was nominated for Best Improvised Jazz Solo for his solo on Cole Porter's "All of You" from his debut album, Two-Shade.

Clayton plays piano with his father, John Clayton, and uncle, Jeff Clayton, on the Clayton Brothers' 2009 album Brother to Brother, which received a Grammy nomination in the Best Jazz Instrumental Album category. The album holds loosely to a theme of songs that were made famous by Thad, Hank and Elvin Jones and other brother groups in jazz. Clayton's piano playing on this album was described by Ben Ratliff of The New York Times as "[filling] up the available space" with Clayton "busying himself with prettiness and authority...If you've listened to much hard bop or mainstream jazz of the early '60s, you might find some easygoing clichés in his playing – or maybe even an awful lot of them – but they are smoothly rendered. More important, the friendly rhetoric of this music allows them."

Clayton has served as musical director of the Monterey Jazz Festival On Tour, and as director of the Monterey Jazz Next Generation Jazz Orchestra.

== Discography ==
=== Studio albums ===
List of studio albums with details and chart positions
Title	Details	Peak chart positions	
Title	Details	US Jazz	US Trad. Jazz
Two-Shade	Released: 2009; Label: ArtistShare; Format: CD, digital download, streaming	—	—
Bond: The Paris Sessions	Released: 2011; Label: EmArcy; Format: CD, digital download, streaming	25	12
Life Forum	Released: 2013; Label: Concord; Format: CD, digital download, streaming	13	9
Tributary Tales	Released: April 21, 2017; Label: Motéma; Format: LP, CD, digital download, streaming		
Bells On Sand	Released: April 1, 2022; Label: Blue Note; Format: LP, CD, digital download, streaming		
Ones & Twos	Released: April 11, 2025; Label: Blue Note; Format: LP, CD, digital download, streaming		
Ones & Twos: Expanded Edition	Released: May 30, 2025; Label: Blue Note; Format: LP, CD, digital download, streaming		

=== Collaborative albums ===
List of collaborative albums with details and chart positions
Title	Details	Peak chart positions	
Title	Details	US Jazz	US Trad. Jazz
Reverence (Kendrick Scott featuring Walter Smith, Gerald Clayton, Mike Moreno, and Derrick Hodge)	Released: August 13, 2009; Label: Criss Cross; Format: CD, digital download, streaming	—	—
While We're Still Young (Patrick Cornelius featuring Gerald Clayton, Jason Palmer, John Ellis, Kendrick Scott, Miles Okazaki, Nick Vayenas, and Peter Slavov)	Released: February 12, 2016; Label: Whirlwind; Format: CD, digital download, streaming	—	—
Let Loose (Peter Bernstein featuring Gerald Clayton, Doug Weiss, and Bill Stewart)	Released: May 6, 2016; Label: Smoke Sessions; Format: CD, digital download, streaming	20	10
Songs and Photographs (Anthony Wilson featuring Gerald Clayton, Jay Bellerose, Joshua Crumbly, and Patrick Warren)	Released: December 7, 2018; Label: Goat Hill; Format: CD, digital download, streaming	—	—
Sanctuary (with Matt Slocum and Larry Grenadier)	Released: May 31, 2019; Label: Sunnyside; Format: CD, digital download, streaming	—	—
Short Stories (Vincente Archer featuring Gerald Clayton and Bill Stewart)	Released: June 9, 2023; Label: Cellar Music; Format: CD, digital download, streaming		
Motion I (Out Of/Into featuring Matt Brewer, Gerald Clayton, Joel Ross, Kendrick Scott, and Immanuel Wilkins)	Released: December 6, 2024; Label: Blue Note; Format: LP, CD, digital download, streaming		

=== Live albums ===
List of live albums with details and chart positions
Title	Details
Happening: Live at The Village Vanguard	Released: July 10, 2020; Label: Blue Note; Format: CD, digital download, streaming

=== Singles ===
==== As lead artist ====
List of singles as lead artist with year and album name
Title	Year	Album
"Lift Every Voice and Sing" (with Preservation Hall Jazz Band)	2021	Music from the Movie MLK/FBI
"Theme from MLK/FBI" (with Preservation Hall Jazz Band)	2021	Music from the Movie MLK/FBI
"If It Was" (with Gretchen Parlato, Alan Hampton, & John Clayton)	2025	—

==== As featured artist ====
List of singles as featured artist with year and album name
Title	Year	Album
"Smooth and You" (Ralph Johnson featuring Gerald Clayton)	2020	—N/a
"Hourglass Sea" (Sachal Vasandani featuring Gerald Clayton)	2020	—N/a

=== Guest appearances ===
List of non-single guest appearances, showing year released, other artist(s) featured, and album name
Title	Year	Other artist(s)	Album
"Listen Here"	2013	Jackie Ryan	Listen Here

=== Piano credits ===
Year	Artist	Title
2023	Vicente Archer	Short Stories
2020	Charles Lloyd	8: Kindred Spirits (Live from the Lobero)
2018	John Scofield	Combo 66
2016	Peter Bernstein	Let Loose
2016	Ben Wendel	What We Bring
2015	Matthew Stevens	Woodwork
2013	Terri Lyne Carrington	Money Jungle: Provocative in Blue
2011	Ambrose Akinmusire	When the Heart Emerges Glistening
2010	Dick Oatts & Terell Stafford Quintet	Bridging the Gap
2009	Melissa Morgan	Until I Met You
2009	Roy Hargrove	Emergence
2008	Roy Hargrove	Earfood
2006	Diana Krall	From This Moment On
2006	Diana Krall	Christmas Songs
2006	Roberta Gambarini	Easy to Love
2005	Laura Welland	Dissertation on the State of Bliss
2004	Teedra Moses	Complex Simplicity
2003	Bobby Rodriguez	Trumpet Talk

== Awards and nominations ==
Year	Association	Category	Work	Result	Reference
2011	Edison Awards	Best International Jazz Album	Bond: The Paris Sessions	Won	
2009	Grammy Awards	Best Improvised Jazz Solo	"All of You" (Cole Porter)	Nominated	
2010	Grammy Awards	Best Instrumental Composition	"Battle Circle"	Nominated	
2011	Grammy Awards	Best Jazz Instrumental Album	Bond: The Paris Sessions	Nominated	
2013	Grammy Awards	Best Jazz Instrumental Album	Life Forum	Nominated	
2020	Grammy Awards	Best Jazz Instrumental Album	Happening: Live at the Village Vanguard	Nominated	
2020	Grammy Awards	Best Improvised Jazz Solo	"Celia" (Bud Powell)	Nominated	
2026		Best Contemporary Instrumental Album	Ones & Twos	Pending	
