= Sachal Vasandani =

- Born: Chicago, Illinois, U.S.
- Genres: Vocal jazz, pop
- Occupations: Singer, songwriter, composer
- Years active: 2000s–present
- Labels: Okeh, Mack Avenue, Edition Records, Patron Saint
- Website: www.sachalsings.com

Sachal Vasandani, sometimes known professionally as Sachal, is an American jazz singer. He released two albums in 2025 on the Patron Saint label: "Best Life Now", and "Best Life Now- Acoustic Sessions". On Edition Records, he released Midnight Shelter (2021) and Still Life (2022). Vasandani released Slow Motion Miracles on the Okeh label in 2015. He previously released three albums on Mack Avenue Records, Eyes Wide Open in 2007, We Move in 2009, and Hi-Fly in 2011. He is known for his unique interpretations of jazz standards and instrumental music, and is also a songwriter, composer and improvisor.

A native of Chicago, Vasandani attracted attention in 1999 when he was named Down Beat magazine's Collegiate Jazz Vocalist of the Year. He has worked with Wynton Marsalis and the Lincoln Center Jazz Orchestra. His debut album was Eyes Wide Open. He has performed consistently worldwide since his first release on Mack Avenue Records in 2007. His second album, We Move (2009), was a New York Times Critics' Pick. He has collaborated with many of the prominent jazz artists of his generation and those of earlier generations, including: Jon Hendricks, Wynton Marsalis, Bill Charlap, Bobby McFerrin, John Clayton, Stefon Harris, Gerald Clayton, Taylor Eigsti, Gretchen Parlato, Becca Stevens, Camila Meza, and others.

He is a graduate of the University of Michigan, where he studied jazz and classical music.

== Reception ==
2015's "Slow Motion Miracles" was described as "Profoundly beautiful.. wide-eyed wonder that subtly threads its sway through much of the album" in a 4-star review by Jazzwise magazine.

In 2010, Vasandani received the Downbeat Magazine Critic's Poll for "Rising Star Jazz Vocalist"

In a September 20, 2009, review in The New York Times, Nate Chinen called Vasandani "a jazz singer with good ideas, including some about what a jazz singer can be."

In a review of Eyes Wide Open, The Boston Globe suggested that Vasandani is "mature in sound and rich in texture but also possesses enough youthful angst in its lyrical themes to ward off the fogeyism that male vocalists so easily slip into before their time."

In an NPR interview that aired in 2011, anchor Michele Norris said, "Every now and again you hear a special voice that makes you sit up and take notice. Sachal Vasandani has that voice".

Slow Motion Miracles (2015) features original compositions, incorporating "an almost undefinable fusion of the best of pop, electronic, and jazz." The album was produced by Michael Leonhart.

== Discography ==
=== Albums ===
Titles	Year	Label
Eyes Wide Open	2007	Mack Avenue
We Move	2009	Mack Avenue
Hi-Fly	2011	Mack Avenue
Slow Motion Miracles	2015	Okeh
Shadow train	2018	GSI
Midnight Shelter	2021	Edition Records

=== Singles ===
- Use somebody, with Gerald Clayton and Harish Raghavan (GSI, 2020).

=== Compilations ===
- It's Christmas on Mack Avenue (Mack Avenue, 2014)
