= Ambrose Akinmusire =

American jazz trumpeter (born 1982)

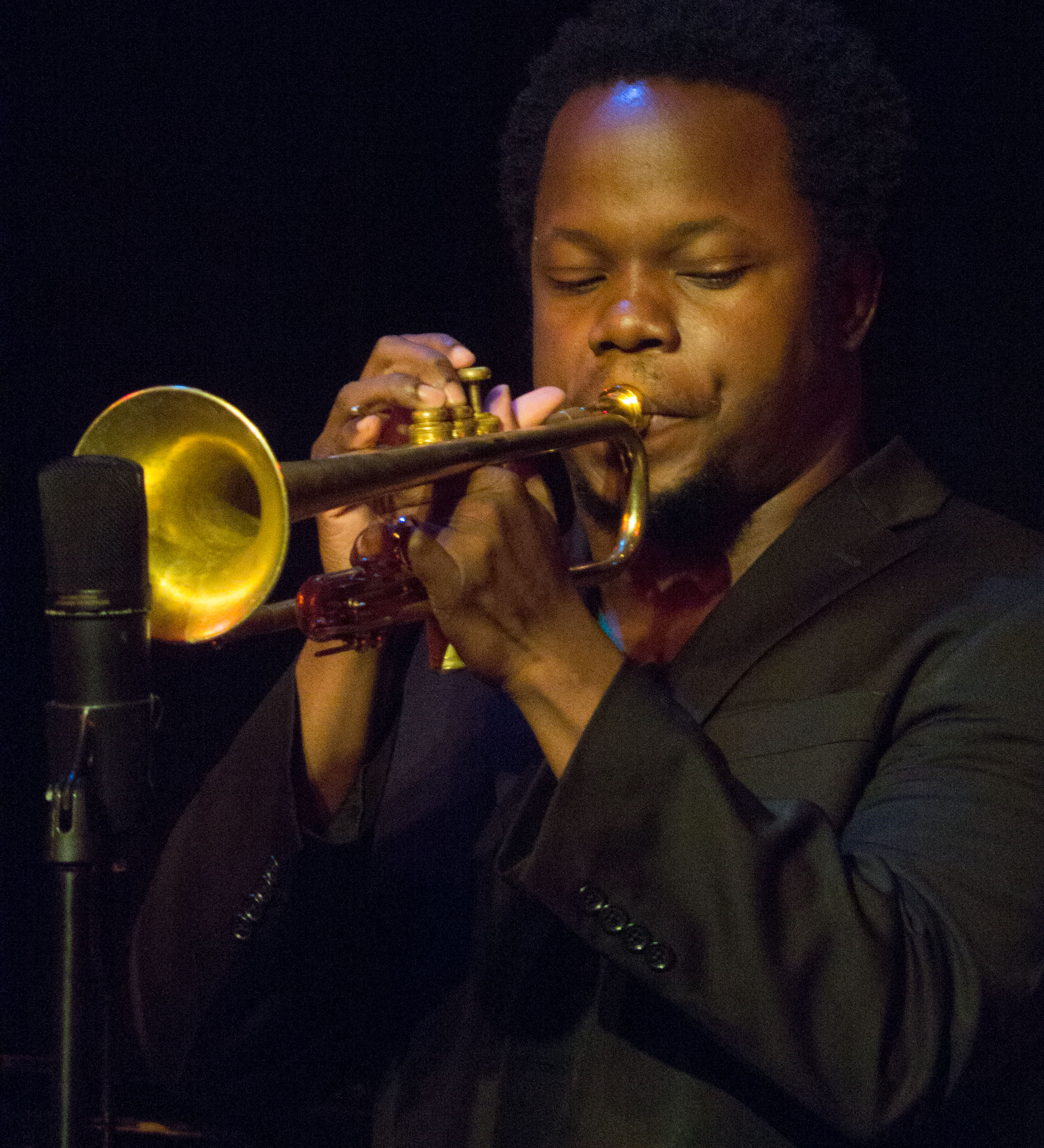
- Akinmusire in Oakland, California, 2014

Background information
- Born: Ambrose Olusiji Akinmusire; May 1, 1982 (age 44); Oakland, California, U.S.
- Genres: Jazz; avant-garde jazz
- Occupations: Composer; musician
- Instrument: Trumpet
- Years active: 2007–present
- Labels: Blue Note / Capitol / Universal; Fresh Sound; EMI; Nonesuch
- Website: www.ambroseakinmusire.com

Ambrose Olusiji Akinmusire (/ˌækɪnˈmuːsəri/ born May 1, 1982) is an American avant-garde jazz trumpeter and composer.

== Biography ==
Born and raised in Oakland, California, Akinmusire was a member of the Berkeley High School Jazz Ensemble, where he caught the attention of saxophonist Steve Coleman, who was visiting the school to lead a workshop. Coleman hired him as a member of his Five Elements band for a European tour. Akinmusire was also a member of the Monterey Jazz Festival's Next Generation Jazz Orchestra.

Akinmusire studied at the Manhattan School of Music before returning to the West Coast to take a master's degree at the University of Southern California and attend the Thelonious Monk Institute of Jazz (now the Herbie Hancock Institute of Jazz) in Los Angeles.

In 2007, Akinmusire won the Thelonious Monk International Jazz Competition and the Carmine Caruso International Jazz Trumpet Solo Competition, two of the most prestigious jazz competitions in the world. The same year, he released his debut recording, Prelude... to Cora, on the Fresh Sound New Talent label. He moved back to New York City and began performing with Vijay Iyer, Aaron Parks, Esperanza Spalding, and Jason Moran, taking part in Moran's innovative multimedia concert event, In My Mind: Monk at Town Hall, 1957. It was also during this time that he caught the attention of Bruce Lundvall, then president of Blue Note Records.

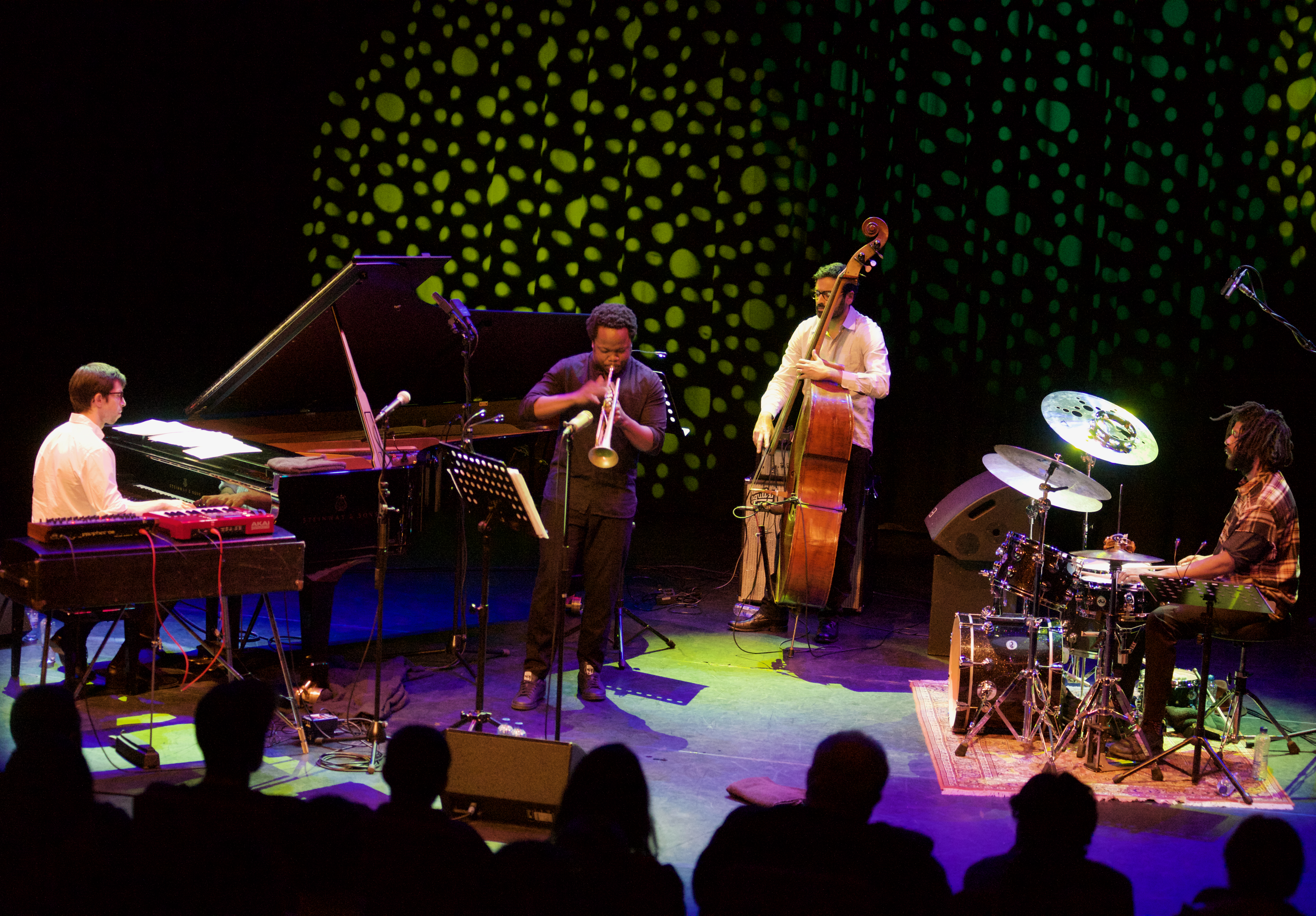
Akinmusire's quartet in Rotterdam, November 2017. From left: Sam Harris, Akinmusire, Harish Raghavan, and Justin Brown.

Akinmusire made his debut on the Blue Note label in 2011 with the album When the Heart Emerges Glistening, featuring his quintet of tenor saxophonist Walter Smith III, pianist Gerald Clayton, bassist Harish Raghavan, and drummer Justin Brown. Akinmusire's third album, entitled The Imagined Savior Is Far Easier to Paint, was released in 2014. His album Origami Harvest was included in The New York Times' Best Jazz of 2018. His sixth studio album, On the Tender Spot of Every Calloused Moment, again with his quartet of longtime bandmates – Sam Harris (piano), Harish Raghavan (bass), and Justin Brown (drums) – was released in spring 2020 and received a Grammy nomination for Best Jazz Instrumental Album.

Akinmusire is featured on the last track of Kendrick Lamar's 2015 release To Pimp a Butterfly.

He has received awards including the 2014 North Sea Jazz Festival's Paul Acket Award and both the Doris Duke Artist and Doris Duke Impact Awards; recognition in the DownBeat Critics' Poll has included Jazz Artist of the Year (2011) and winning the trumpet category every year from 2013 to 2020.

In the 2026 Grammy Awards, he received a nomination for the album Honey from a Winter Stone in the Best Alternative Jazz Album category.

On August 20, 2026, Akinmusire performed at London's Royal Albert Hall, in the BBC Proms for the Miles Davis Centenary, with the BBC Concert Orchestra and Miho Hazama.

== Selected discography ==
=== As leader ===
Year	Title	Label	Personnel
2008	Prelude... to Cora	Fresh Sound	Ambrose Akinmusire (trumpet), Aaron Parks (piano), Chris Dingman, Walter Smith III (tenor saxophone), Joe Sanders (bass), Justin Brown (drums), Logan Richardson (alto saxophone), Junko Watanabe (vocals)
2011	When the Heart Emerges Glistening	Blue Note / EMI Records	Ambrose Akinmusire (trumpet, celeste, voice), Smith (tenor saxophone), Gerald Clayton (piano), Jason Moran (Rhodes), Harish Raghavan (bass), Justin Brown (drums)
2014	The Imagined Savior Is Far Easier to Paint	Blue Note / Capitol / Universal Records	Akinmusire (trumpet, percussion), Walter Smith III (tenor saxophone), Harish Raghavan (bass), Justin Brown (drums), Sam Harris (mellotron, piano), Charles Altura (guitar), Theo Bleckmann (vocals), Cold Specks (vocals), Becca Stevens (vocals), Elena Pinderhughes (flute) and OSSO String Quartet: Maria Im (violin), Brooke Quiggins Saulnier (violin), Kallie Ciechomski (viola), Maria Jeffers (cello)
2017	A Rift in Decorum: Live at the Village Vanguard (2CDs)	Blue Note / Capitol / Universal Records	Ambrose Akinmusire (trumpet), Sam Harris (piano), Harish Raghavan (bass), Justin Brown (drums)
2018	Origami Harvest	Blue Note / Capitol / Universal Records	Ambrose Akinmusire (trumpet, synthesizer, voice), Kool A.D. (vocals), LmbrJck_t (vocals), Sam Harris (piano, keyboards), Michael Aaberg (keyboards), Marcus Gilmore (drums), Olivia De Prato (violin), Lauren Cauley Kalal (violin), Victor Lowrie Tafoya (viola), Mariel Roberts (cello), Walter Smith III (tenor saxophone)
2020	On the Tender Spot of Every Calloused Moment	Blue Note	Ambrose Akinmusire (trumpet, Rhodes), Sam Harris (piano), Harish Raghavan (bass), Justin Brown (drums)
2023	Beauty Is Enough	Origami Harvest	Ambrose Akinmusire (trumpet)
2023	Owl Song	Nonesuch Records	Ambrose Akinmusire (trumpet), Bill Frisell (guitar), Herlin Riley (drums)
2025	Honey from a Winter Stone	Nonesuch Records	Ambrose Akinmusire (trumpet), Kokayi (vocals), Sam Harris (piano), Chiquita (synthesizer), Justin Brown (drums), Mivos Quartet: Olivia Deprato (violin), Maya Bennardo (violin), Victor Lowrie Tafoya (viola), Tyler Borden (cello)

=== Collaborations ===
Year	Artist	Title	Label
2026	Ambrose Akinmusire & Mary Halvorson	Slo-Mo Neon Luminate Hoverings	Nonesuch Records

=== As sideman ===
Year	Artist	Title	Label
2001	Steve Coleman	Resistance Is Futile	Label Bleu
2002	Aaron Parks	Shadows	Keynote
2003	Vijay Iyer & Mike Ladd	In What Language?	Pi Recordings
2006	Walter Smith III	Casually Introducing	New Talent Spain
2007	Alan Pasqua	Anti Social Club	Cryptogramophone
2007	Sara Gazarek	Return to You	Native Language
2007	Josh Roseman	New Constellations: Live in Vienna	Accurate
2008	John Escreet	Consequences	Posi-Tone
2008	Esperanza Spalding	Esperanza	Heads Up
2008	Danny Grissett	Form	Criss Cross Jazz
2009	Le Boeuf Brothers	House Without a Door	lbjazz
2009	Roy Hargrove Big Band	Emergence	EmArcy
2010	John Escreet	Don't Fight the Inevitable	Mythology
2010	Walter Smith III	III	Criss Cross Jazz
2010	David Binney	Barefooted Town	Criss Cross Jazz
2011	David Binney	Graylen Epicenter	Mythology
2011	Vince Mendoza	Nights on Earth	Horizontal Jazz
2011	Chris Dingman	Waking Dreams	Between Worlds
2012	Mette Juul	Moon on my Shoulder	
2012	Jack DeJohnette	Sound Travels	Golden Beams / eOne
2013	Dayna Stephens	That Nepenthentic Place	Sunnyside
2013	Gerald Clayton	Life Forum	Concord Jazz
2013	Yellowjackets	A Rise in the Road	Mack Avenue
2015	Marcus Miller	Afrodeezia	Blue Note
2016	Wolfgang Muthspiel	Rising Grace	ECM
2017	Blue Note All-Stars	Our Point of View	Blue Note
2018	Camilla Battaglia	EMIT: Rotator Tenet	Dodicilune
2018	Allison Miller & Carmen Staaf	Science Fair	Sunnyside
2018	Roscoe Mitchell Quartet	Come and See What There Is to See	The Lab
2018	Laila Biali	Laila Biali	ACT
2018	Raymond Angry	One	JMI
2018	Mary Halvorson	Code Girl	Firehouse 12
2018	Wolfgang Muthspiel	Where the River Goes	ECM
2019	Brad Mehldau	Finding Gabriel	Nonesuch
2023	Dhafer Youssef	Street of Minarets	Beat Back Edition
2023	Billy Childs	The Winds of Change	Mack Avenue
