= Logan Richardson =

American alto saxophonist (born 1980)

- Logan Richardson self portrait

Background information
- Born: July 29, 1980; Kansas City, Missouri, United States
- Genre: Jazz
- Occupations: Musician, bandleader, composer
- Instruments: Alto saxophone, flute
- Years active: 1996–present
- Labels: Blue Note, Inner Circle Music, Fresh Sound, Ropeadope
- Member of: NEXT Collective
- Website: www.loganrichardson.global

Logan Richardson (born July 29, 1980, Kansas City, Missouri) is an alto saxophonist, composer, bandleader, and producer.

Richardson debuted as a bandleader with his 2007 album Cerebral Flow. He is also a member of the band NEXT Collective. In 2015, Richardson released his label recording debut entitled SHIFT on Blue Note Records featuring Pat Metheny, Jason Moran, Harish Raghavan, and Nasheet Waits.

== Childhood ==
Richardson grew up surrounded by the numerous LPs and 45s of his parents. He was constantly immersed in R&B, pop, rock, funk, soul, Motown, and gospel from an early age. His first musical memories include artists such as The Temptations, Stevie Wonder, Prince (musician), Mahalia Jackson, Phil Collins, James Ingram, Hall & Oates, and Michael Jackson.

== Early career ==
While attending Paseo Academy of Fine and Performing Arts, Richardson was exposed to jazz personalities who would have a profound impact on his future. Max Roach was the first jazz musician Richardson can remember seeing live. The American Jazz Museum brought Roach to Kansas City frequently in the mid 1990s as a clinician. Richardson also had the opportunity to perform with legendary Kansas City bandleader Jay McShann in the 1990s, in addition to studying with Kansas City Saxophone great, and educator Ahmad Alaadeen. In 1996 Richardson began leading his own groups in Kansas City while in high school.

Richardson performed with the Kansas City Symphony in concert February 27, 1997 at the age of 16, when he was invited by then conductor of the Kansas City Symphony Orchestra Bill McGlaughlin, a performance that changed his life.

== New York years ==
Moving to New York City in August 2001, Richardson witnessed the September 11th attacks first hand. He was enrolled at the New School University where he met, befriended, and performed with young musicians Frank Locrasto, Tommy Crane, Jamire Williams, Joe Sanders, Burniss Earl Travis, Dekel Bor, and teachers Greg Tardy, Carl Allen, Joe Chambers, Billy Hart, and many others including Stefon Harris, JD Allen, Butch Morris, Mulgrew Miller, and more.....

Since 2005, Richardson has led his own group, SHIFT. Featuring Richardson's soloing & compositions, as well as the creative and genre-bending playing of his compatriots, SHIFT attempts to answer the question, "Can there be new music in jazz?"

Richardson has also been a member of drummer Nasheet Waits (son of jazz drummer Freddie Waits) group Equality, a band that has played many top international festivals such as "North Sea Jazz Festival", and "Jazz Baltica" with pianists Jason Moran, Stanley Cowell, and bassist Tarus Mateen.

On February 27, 2009, Richardson was a member of the much-lauded Monk at Town Hall performance with Jason Moran & Big Bandwagon, culminating in the historic performance at Town Hall celebrating a reshaping of Monk's music by Moran.

== Discography ==
As leader

- Sacred Garden (WAX Industry, 2024)
- Holy Water (WAX Industry, 2023)
- Afrofuturism (Whirlwind Recordings, 2021)
- blues PEOPLE (Ropeadope, 2018)
- Shift (Blue Note, 2015) (featuring Pat Metheny)
- Ethos (Inner Circle Music, 2008)
- Cerebral Flow (Fresh Sound, 2007)

As sideman

- Modes of Communication: Letters from the Underworlds (2020), Nduduzo Makhathini
- Ancestral Recall (2019), Christian Scott
- Tributary Tales (2017), Gerald Clayton
- Cover Art (2013), NEXT Collective
- Life Forum (2013), Gerald Clayton
- Dream Pursuit (2012), Tony Tixier
- Morgan Rewind: A Tribute to Lee Morgan Vol. 1, (JMood Records, 2012) Roberto Magris
- III (2010), Walter Smith III
- Sixty-Eight, (2011) Billy Hart
- Equality (2009), Nasheet Waits
- The Winding Shell (2009) Jesse Elder
- Prelude... to Cora (2008) Ambrose Akinmusire
- Steps of Faith (2006), Greg Tardy
- The Outlaw (2005), Joe Chambers
- The Golden Republic (2005), The Golden Republic
