= Walter Smith III =

American jazz saxophonist and composer (born 1980)

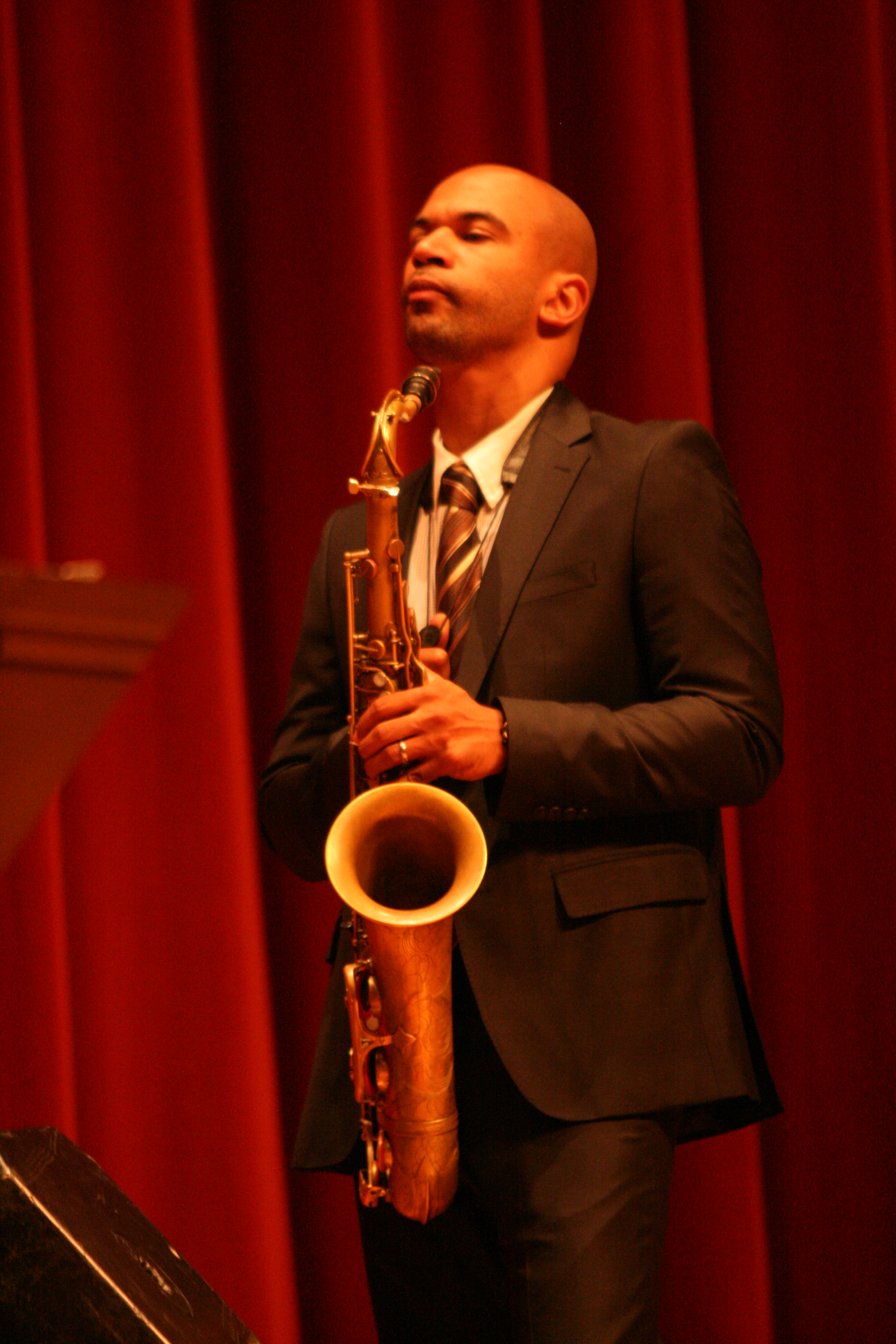
- Walter Smith III with the Ambrose Akinmusire Quintet

Background information
- Born: September 24, 1980 (age 45); Houston, Texas, U.S.
- Genres: Jazz, post-bop
- Occupation: Musician
- Instrument: Tenor saxophone
- Website: www.waltersmith3.com

Walter Smith III (born September 24, 1980) is an American jazz saxophonist and composer. He is the Chair of the Woodwind Department at the Berklee College of Music.

In addition to performing with his own group, Smith is a member of the Ambrose Akinmusire Quintet and Eric Harland's Voyager. He regularly plays and records with Taylor Eigsti, Christian Scott, Logan Richardson, Kendrick Scott, Aaron Parks, Warren Wolf, and others.

== Biography ==
Smith began playing the saxophone at the age of seven in his hometown of Houston, Texas. His father was an elementary music teacher. His first gig was at a McDonald's. While at Houston's High School for the Performing and Visual Arts, he received a Clifford Brown/Stan Getz Fellowship from the International Association for Jazz Education (IAJE) and the National Foundation for Advancement in the Arts (NFAA); the NFAA Young Talent Award; a full-tuition scholarship to attend Berklee College of Music; and a United States Presidential Scholar in the Arts medal. He graduated from Berklee College of Music in 2003 with a Bachelor of Fine Arts degree in Music Education. He later earned a Graduate Diploma at the Thelonious Monk Institute of Jazz. Smith earned his Master of Music degree in Jazz Studies from Manhattan School of Music.

Smith has performed in numerous national and international festivals and on stages in the U.S. such as Carnegie Hall and the Kennedy Center. He has performed and recorded with many jazz notables, including Terence Blanchard, Roy Haynes, Christian McBride, Eric Reed, Mulgrew Miller, Joe Lovano, Bob Hurst, Myron Walden, Walter Beasley, Lewis Nash, Terri Lyne Carrington, and others. To date, he has made more than 37 recordings.

Smith's debut recording as a leader was released in March 2006 on the Fresh Sound New Talent label and features Ambrose Akinmusire, Aaron Parks, Reuben Rogers, Eric Harland, and Kendrick Scott, and others. His sophomore release, entitled Live in Paris, was released in October 2009 featuring Ambrose Akinmusire, Aaron Goldberg, Matt Brewer, and Marcus Gilmore.

Smith is currently signed to Blue Note Records.

== Discography ==
=== As leader ===
- Casually Introducing (with Reuben Rogers, Vicente Archer, Eric Harland, Kendrick Scott, Robert Glasper, Lionel Loueke, Aaron Parks, Ambrose Akinmusire) (2006) (Fresh Sound)
- Live In Paris (with Matt Brewer, Marcus Gilmore, Aaron Goldberg, Ambrose Akinmusire) (2009) (Space Time)
- Bronze (with Alan Hampton, Bill Campbell, Mark Small) (2010) (Fresh Sound New Talent)
- III (with Ambrose Akinmusire, Jason Moran, Joe Sanders, Eric Harland, Logan Richardson) (2010) (Criss Cross)
- Still Casual (with Harish Raghavan, Kendrick Scott, Taylor Eigsti, Ambrose Akinmusire, Matthew Stevens) (2014) (Space Time)
- TWIO (with Harish Raghavan, Eric Harland, Joshua Redman, Christian McBride) (2018) (Whirlwind)
- In Common (with Matthew Stevens, Harish Raghavan, Marcus Gilmore, Joel Ross) (2018) (Whirlwind)
- In Common 2 (with Matthew Stevens, Micah Thomas, Linda May Han Oh, Nate Smith) (2020) (Whirlwind)
- In Common III (with Matthew Stevens, Kris Davis, Dave Holland, Terri Lyne Carrington) (2022) (Whirlwind)
- Return to Casual (with Taylor Eigsti, Matt Stevens, Harish Raghavan, Kendrick Scott) (2023) (Blue Note)
- Three of Us Are From Houston and Reuben Is Not (with Jason Moran, Reuben Rogers, Eric Harland) (2024) (Blue Note)

=== As sideman ===
With Ambrose Akinmusire

- Prelude... to Cora (Fresh Sound New Talent, 2008)
- When the Heart Emerges Glistening (Blue Note, 2011)
- Origami Harvest (Blue Note, 2018)

With Eric Harland

- Voyager: Live by Night (2010)
- Vipassana (2014)

With Christian Scott

- Rewind That (2006)
- Anthem (2007)
- Live at Newport (2008)

With Kendrick Scott

- The Source (World Culture Music, 2007)
- Reverence (2009)
- Corridors (2023)

With others

- Terence Blanchard, Choices (2009)
- Matt Slocum, With Love and Sadness (2022)
- Dayna Stephens, Reminiscent (2015)
- Dave Stryker, Baker's Circle (2021)
- Danny Grissett, The In-Between (2015)
