= ACT (album) =

Studio album by Ben Wendel, Harish Raghavan & Nate Wood
- Released: 2009
- Genre: Jazz; post-bop
- Length: 52:26
- Label: Brooklyn Jazz Underground; BJUR 011 CD

Ben Wendel chronology
Simple Song (2009)	ACT (2009)	Frame (2012)

ACT is a studio album by the jazz trio ACT, consisting of saxophonist Ben Wendel, bassist Harish Raghavan, and drummer Nate Wood, released by Brooklyn Jazz Underground Records in 2009.

About making the album, Wendel explained,

The three of us have known each other for quite some time – we've played in a lot of different groups together but always gravitated towards the trio format. Making this album has been something we've wanted to do for a while. We ended up with two free days last year and tracked the music down at Steve Wood's private studio (Steve is Nate's father and one of the best engineers on the West Coast).

The standards we chose came naturally out of a few warm up gigs leading to the recording. The originals were written with the trio in mind, and a few (like "Act") were written quickly just before tracking. "News" was loosely inspired by a blues that my friend Walter Smith III wrote off of his first album. "What Was" is based on a sketch that has eventually turned into a movement of a jazz suite I'm writing for the Chamber Music of America "New Works Grant." Although this is mostly a trio format, I added piano and bassoon on a few tracks to change the soundscape up a bit.

== Reception ==
Ottawa Citizen's Peter Hum called the album "predominantly tumultuous and dark-hued, brashly syncopated and intense", continuing that "Wendel's capable of long, dizzying lines, sounding at times like a more slippery Branford Marsalis. Raghavan is hugely propulsive and Wood is a fine rough-and-tumble drummer. As they play with all the energy and focus they're capable of, they're also tremendously attuned to each other and to the overall shape of each song."

== Track listing ==
All tracks are written by Ben Wendel except where noted.

No.	Title	Writer(s)	Length
1.	"News"		7:00
2.	"Act"		6:25
3.	"Title"	Harish Raghavan	4:52
4.	"Oldworld"		4:48
5.	"Pentup House"	Sonny Rollins	7:06
6.	"Shamed into Love"	Elvis Costello; Rubén Blades	7:38
7.	"Break"	Raghavan	8:01
8.	"What Was"		6:36
Total length:			52:26

== Personnel ==
Musicians

- Ben Wendel – tenor saxophone, bassoon, piano
- Harish Raghavan – double bass
- Nate Wood – drums

Technical

- Nate Wood – recording engineer, mixing, mastering
- Steve Wood – recording engineer
