= Barcode (album) =

Studio album by Ben Wendel
- Released: March 13, 2026
- Recorded: January 16–17, 2025
- Studio: The Bunker (Brooklyn)
- Genre: Jazz
- Length: 41:38
- Label: Edition
- Producer: Ben Wendel

Ben Wendel chronology
Understory: Live at the Village Vanguard (2024)	Barcode (2026)

Barcode (stylized as BaRcoDe) is a studio album by Canadian-American saxophonist Ben Wendel, recorded on January 16 and 17, 2025, and released by Edition Records on March 13, 2026. It features Wendel in an ensemble with four vibraphonists and percussionists: Joel Ross, Simon Moullier, Patricia Brennan, and Juan Diego Villalobos. The album is named for the quintet, Barcode, which developed during residencies the musicians had at the Jazz Gallery, in New York City, in 2023 and 2025. It features aspects of chamber music, modern jazz, and electronic experimentation.

== Critical reception ==
Modern Jazz Today noted, "Barcode often favors linear development over sectional contrast. [...] Rather than returning to familiar landmarks, the music moves steadily forward, with improvisation embedded into the ensemble fabric, [...] shaped by momentum, contour, and collective precision rather than overt display."

PostGenre called it "a blend of sound, in an approach perhaps never heard on record before. [...] Wendel does what he does best: produce a truly unique piece of music."

Presto Music's review stated, "Barcode stands as a singular work. The soundscape created by the mallet‑driven group provides a spacious yet firm foundation for Wendel's pliant, probing saxophone. [...] [It] gestures towards an evolving blueprint, one showing how acoustic improvisers might thrive within a technologically saturated landscape while maintaining a delicate balance between emotional depth and cerebral design."

UK Jazz News wrote, "Wendel is on tenor throughout, and makes full use of the contrast with his chosen accompanists. [...] [It is] a very refreshing album, then, making great use of the talents of all involved, and an object lesson in thoughtful use of decidedly non-routine resources to create music that is distinctive and often has great beauty."

== Track listing ==
All tracks are written by Ben Wendel, except "Olha Maria" (written by Antônio Carlos Jobim).

Barcode track listing
No.	Title	Length
1.	"Clouds"	6:51
2.	"Mimo"	6:35
3.	"Olha Maria"	10:29
4.	"Repeat After Me"	4:38
5.	"Birds Ascend"	3:40
6.	"Lonely One"	9:25
Total length:		41:38

Exclusive digital bonus track
No.	Title	Length
7.	"Floating"	6:29
Total length:		48:07

== Personnel ==
Credits are adapted from the album's liner notes, Edition Records, and Tidal.

- Ben Wendel – tenor saxophone, electronic effects, production
- Joel Ross – vibraphone, marimba
- Simon Moullier – vibraphone, chromatic balafon, electronic effects
- Patricia Brennan – vibraphone, electronic effects
- Juan Diego Villalobos – vibraphone, electric marimba, percussion, electronic effects, MalletStation
- Alex Conroy – recording
- Steve Wood – mixing
- Nate Wood – mastering
- Oli Bentley – artwork
- Gilad Hekselman – split photography
