= Small Constructions =

2013 studio album by Ben Wendel and Dan Tepfer

Studio album by Ben Wendel & Dan Tepfer
- Released: March 12, 2013
- Recorded: October 7–10, 2011
- Studio: Yamaha Artist Services, New York
- Genre: Jazz
- Length: 51:20
- Label: Sunnyside; SSC 4013
- Producer: Ben Wendel; Dan Tepfer

Ben Wendel chronology
Frame (2012)	Small Constructions (2013)	Act II (2015)

Dan Tepfer chronology
Goldberg Variations/Variations (2011)	Small Constructions (2013)	First Meeting: Live in London, Volume 1 (2014)

Small Constructions is a studio album by saxophonist Ben Wendel and pianist Dan Tepfer, released on March 12, 2023, by Sunnyside Records.

== Reception ==
The All About Jazz review stated: "The use of overdubbing on several tracks, the multiplication of instruments, and even daring combinations... helps greatly expand the tonal palette available to the musicians, who nevertheless maintain restraint, good taste, a respect for form, and, why not, elegance." Chris Barton of the Los Angeles Times commended the album for its "restless invention", writing: "While still a duet, the album lives up to its name with some judicious multi-tracking, [...] proving again that even with only two voices, there are seemingly endless avenues to harmony." Adding to this, Nate Chinen of The New York Times called the album a "breakthrough for both its musicians".

Professional ratings
Review scores
Source	Rating
All About Jazz	3.5/5 stars

== Track listing ==
All tracks are written by Ben Wendel except where noted.

No.	Title	Writer(s)	Length
1.	"Still Play"		5:24
2.	"Pannonica"	Thelonious Monk	4:02
3.	"Jean and Renata"		5:39
4.	"Line up"	Lennie Tristano	4:21
5.	"Line"		2:00
6.	"Nines"	Tepfer	6:23
7.	"Gratitude"	Tepfer	6:04
8.	"Ask Me Now"	Monk	5:54
9.	"Rygabag"	Tepfer	2:02
10.	"Darn That Dream"	Jimmy Van Heusen; Eddie DeLange	3:04
11.	"Variation 1 In D Minor"	George Frideric Handel	3:59
12.	"Oblique Strategy"	Wendel; Tepfer	2:28
Total length:			51:20

== Personnel ==
Music

- Ben Wendel – saxophone, bassoon, melodica, piano (12)
- Dan Tepfer – piano, Rhodes piano, alto saxophone (12)

Production

- Christopher Drukker – graphic design
- Nate Wood – mastering, mixing
- Vincent Soyez – photography
