= Dan Tepfer =

French-American pianist and composer (born 1982)

- Tepfer performing in Madrid, Spain

Background information
- Born: 8 January 1982 (age 44); Paris, France
- Genres: Jazz; classical
- Occupation: Musician
- Instrument: Piano
- Years active: 2005–present
- Labels: Sunnyside, Verve, StorySound
- Website: www.dantepfer.com

Dan Tepfer (born 8 January 1982, in Paris, France) is a French-American jazz pianist and composer. He is best known for his 2011 album Goldberg Variations/Variations and his 2019 multimedia project Natural Machines.

== Biography ==
Dan Tepfer grew up in Paris, France, in a musical and scientific family. He received a bachelor's degree in astrophysics from the University of Edinburgh and a master's degree in jazz piano performance from the New England Conservatory of Music in Boston. He currently lives in Brooklyn, New York, where he works as a pianist and composer. He tours around the world, with frequent appearances in Europe in particular. Since 2009, he has released a series of critically acclaimed recordings on the labels Sunnyside and Verve, working in trio, duo, and solo formats.

One of his most frequent musical collaborations are duos with saxophonists, including his mentor Lee Konitz, as well as Miguel Zenón and Ben Wendel. Tepfer's project, Natural Machines, which combines video and audio technology with improvised piano playing, debuted at Carnegie Hall in 2025 with an update that allows him to "play" an entire orchestra in real time. He has become a fixture in the New York live jazz scene, at jazz clubs and house concerts.

== Awards and honors ==
- 2006: First Prize and Audience Prize, Montreux Jazz Festival Bösendorfer Solo Piano Competition
- 2007: Winner of American Piano Awards and Cole Porter Fellowship in Jazz, American Piano Awards
- 2011: CHOC Jazz Magazine (France) for Goldberg Variations / Variations
- 2011–2013: Rising Star Pianist, DownBeat
- 2012–2013: Rising Star Pianist, JazzTimes
- 2014: Charles Ives Fellowship, American Academy of Arts and Letters
- 2016: MacDowell Fellowship, MacDowell Colony
- 2017: CHOC Jazz Magazine (France) for Eleven Cages
- 2018: Fondation BNP-Paribas 3-year artistic development award

== Discography ==
- 2005: Before the Storm – with Richie Barshay and Jorge Roeder (DIZ)
- 2007: Oxygen – with Richie Barshay and Jorge Roeder (DIZ)
- 2009: Twelve Free Improvisations in Twelve Keys (DIZ)
- 2009: Duos with Lee – duo with Lee Konitz (Sunnyside)
- 2010: Five Pedals Deep – with Thomas Morgan and Ted Poor (Sunnyside)
- 2011: Goldberg Variations/Variations (Sunnyside)
- 2013: Small Constructions – with Ben Wendel (Sunnyside)
- 2014: First Meeting: Live in London, Volume 1 – live, with Lee Konitz, Michael Janisch & Jeff Williams (Whirlwind)
- 2017: Eleven Cages – with Thomas Morgan and Nate Wood (Sunnyside)
- 2018: Decade – duo with Lee Konitz (Verve)
- 2019: Natural Machines – with real-time musical and visual algorithmic response (Sunnyside)
- 2023: Inventions / Reinventions (StorySound Records)
- 2023: Internal Melodies – with Miguel Zenón (Main Door Music)

With Billy Hart

- Sixty-Eight (SteepleChase, 2011)

Film Score

- Movement+Location
