= Frame (Ben Wendel album) =

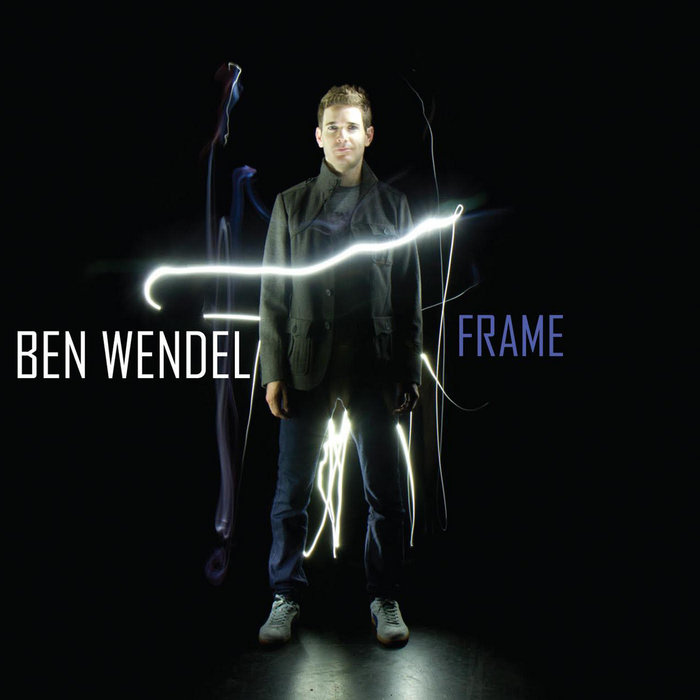

Studio album by Ben Wendel
- Released: February 28, 2012
- Recorded: January 19 & 20, 2011
- Genre: Contemporary jazz
- Length: 61:16
- Label: Sunnyside; SSC 1308

Ben Wendel chronology
Act (2009)	Frame (2012)	Small Constructions (2013)

Frame is an album by saxophonist and composer Ben Wendel, released on February 28, 2012, on the Sunnyside label. It features a mix of contemporary styles, with configurations ranging from a duo to a full sextet. The album was recorded on January 19 and 20, 2011, in Brooklyn, New York.

Frame features multireedist Ben Wendel, primarily on tenor saxophone, with keyboards played by Gerald Clayton, Tigran Hamasyan (piano), Adam Benjamin, guitarist Nir Felder, bassist Ben Street, and drummer Nate Wood.

== Reception ==
Frame received positive reviews upon its release, with critics praising the musicians' virtuosity and the album's diverse yet cohesive nature. Michael J. West, in his review dated April 14, 2012, commended the album's masterful centerpiece, "Jean and Renata," as well as Wendel's saxophone skills and the band's tight chemistry.

== Track listing ==
All tracks are written by Ben Wendel except where noted.

No.	Title	Writer(s)	Length
1.	"Chorale"		5:38
2.	"Clayland"		7:25
3.	"Con Alma"	Dizzy Gillespie	7:06
4.	"Backbou"		5:05
5.	"Jean and Renata"		5:56
6.	"Blocks"		8:09
7.	"Frame"		8:20
8.	"Leaving"		8:08
9.	"Julia"		5:29
Total length:			61:16

== Personnel ==
- Ben Wendel – saxophone, bassoon, melodica
- Gerald Clayton – piano (1–3)
- Tigran Hamasyan – piano (4, 6, 7)
- Adam Benjamin – piano (1, 4, 6, 7), Rhodes piano (8, 9)
- Nir Felder – guitar
- Ben Street – bass
- Nate Wood – drums

== Production ==
- Michael Perez-Cisneros – tracking engineer
- Nate Wood – mixing, mastering
- Christopher Drukker – graphic design
- Dan Kitchens, Leah Chun – photography
