= Michael Janisch =

Michael Janisch may refer to:

- Michael Janisch (actor) (1927–2004), Austrian actor
- Michael Janisch (musician) (born 1979), American bassist, producer and composer
