= Adam Forkelid =

Swedish jazz musician (born 1979)

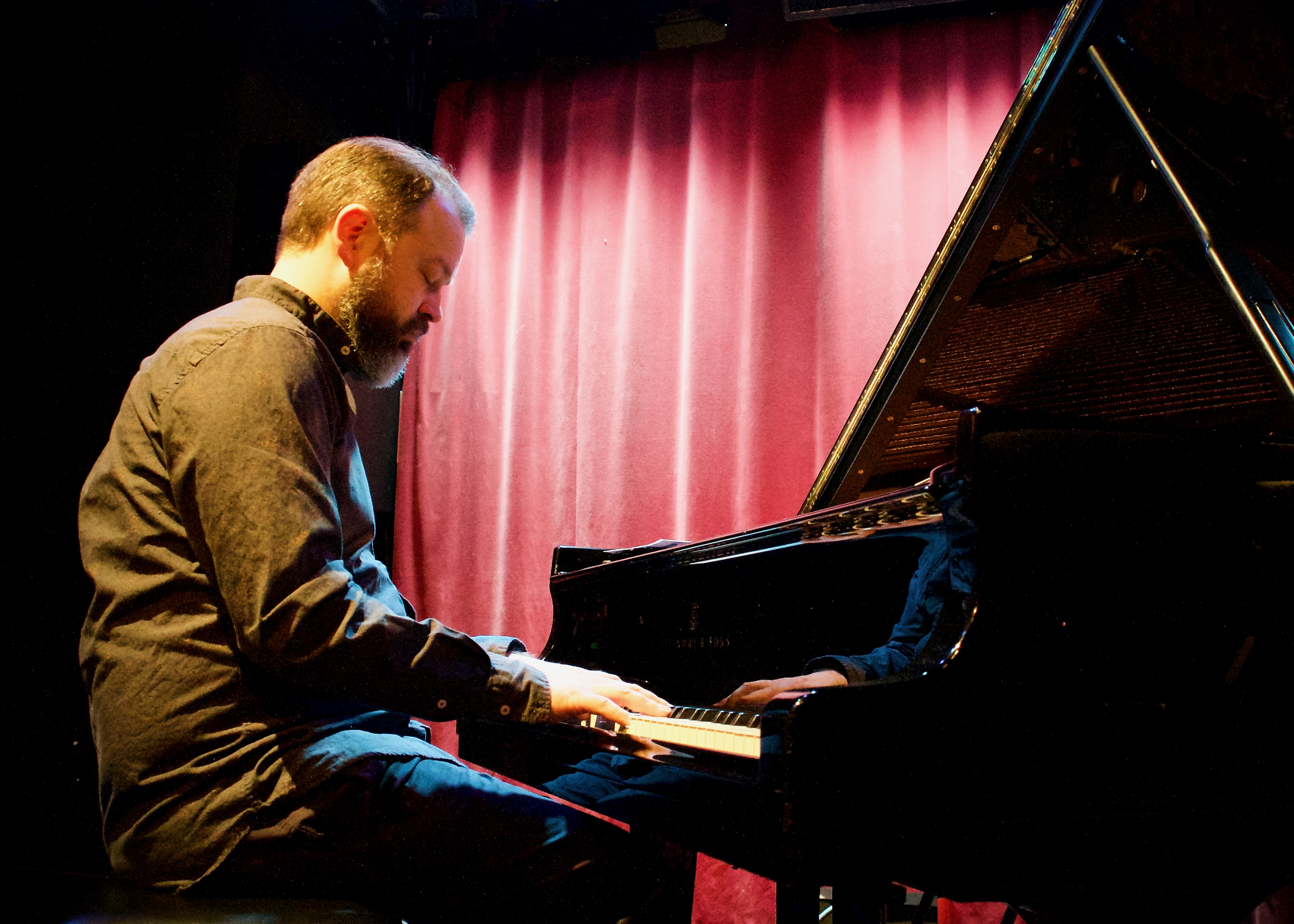
- Adam Forkelid in 2020.

Background information
- Born: 6 September 1979 (age 46); Sweden
- Genres: Jazz
- Occupation: Pianist
- Instrument: Piano
- Years active: 2005–

Adam Forkelid (born September 6, 1979) is a Swedish jazz musician (piano, composition).

== Early life and education ==
Adam Forkelid was born in Sweden and developed an interest in music at an early age. At the age of five, he started taking drum lessons from the renowned drummer and educator Petúr Östlund, while his father simultaneously introduced him to playing the piano. He pursued his studies in jazz piano at the Royal College of Music in Stockholm, where he refined his technical skills and compositional techniques.

== Career ==
Forkelid leads several groups interpreting his own compositions, including the trio Lekverk, the quartet Pace, the electroacoustic quintet Soundscape Orchestra, the Brazilian-influenced Nórdico. Since 2021 he has led the Adam Forkelid 1st Movement, a quartet featuring Carl Mörner Ringström on guitar, Niklas Fernqvist on bass and Daniel Fredriksson on drums.

He has collaborated and recorded with many renowned Swedish jazz musicians, such as Karl-Martin Almquist, Magnus Lindgren, Peter Asplund, Jan Allan, Karin Hammar, Magnus Öström, Rigmor Gustafsson, Sarah Riedel, Viktoria Tolstoy, and Christina Gustafsson. Adam has also performed on tour with the renowned Brazilian guitarist Pedro Martins, collaborated with British composer Gavin Bryars, and worked with the Cullberg Ballet.

As of 2012, Forkelid was a member of the Norrbotten Big Band in Luleå. He participated in productions with Maria Schneider, Tim Hagans, Angélique Kidjo, Anne Mette Iversen, Marilyn Mazur, Knower, Louis Cole, and E. J. Strickland.

He also was head teacher of jazz piano at the Royal College of Music in Stockholm 2017–2021. He is married to saxophonist Elin Larsson, with whom he also plays in the quartet Pace.

== Awards and recognition ==
Forkelid has received several jazz awards and scholarships in recognition of his work as a pianist and composer. Some of these accolades include grants and honors from Fasching, the Bert Levins Foundation, STIM, and SKAP.

With the trio Lekverk he won the 2011 Swedish indie label award Manifest in the Best Jazz category for "Everyday" (Parallell 2010). He was also nominated for the same award in 2019 with his album "Reminiscence" (Moserobie 2018).

== Discography (selected) ==
As a leader

- Turning Point (Prophone 2024, with Carl Mörner Ringström, Niklas Fernqvist, Daniel Fredriksson)
- 1st Movement (Prophone 2021, with Carl Mörner Ringström, Niklas Fernqvist, Daniel Fredriksson)
- Adam Forkelid, Georg Riedel, Jon Fält: Reminiscence (Moserobie 2018)
- Cirkel (Apart Records 2005, with Joakim Milder, Pär-Ola Landin, Jon Fält)

With Lekverk:

- Everyday (Parallell 2010, with Putte Johander, Jon Fält)
- 21st Century Jump (Parallell 2008, with Putte Johander, Jon Fält)

With Soundscape Orchestra:

- Dream Drone (Jazz-O-Tech 2022, with Thomas Wingren, Calle Rasmusson, Peter Fredman, Anders Åstrand, Hux Nettermalm)
- Nexus (DO Music 2018, Dream Drone (Jazz-O-Tech 2022, with Thomas Wingren, Calle Rasmusson, Peter Fredman, Anders Åstrand)

With Erratic:

- Point Nemo (Elektramusic 2024, with Thomas Wingren)

With PACE:

- Searchlight (Playing With Music 2013, with Elin Larsson, Pär-Ola Landin, Christopher Cantillo)

With Svante Söderqvist Trio:

- The Rocket (Caprice 2023, with Svante Söderqvist, Calle Rasmusson, Tuulikki Bartosik, Klas Lindquist)
- I Loves You Porgy (single, Prophone 2021, with Svante Söderqvist, Calle Rasmusson)
- Arrival (Prophone 2020, with Svante Söderqvist, Calle Rasmusson, Adam Baldych, Maria Winther)

With Örjan Hultén:

- Avant-garde Mélodique (OP 111 Productions 2024)
- Örjan Hultén Orion – Fältrapport (Artogrush 2016, with Örjan Hultén, Peter Danemo, Filip Augustsson)
- Örjan Hultén Orion – Mr. Nobody (Artogrush 2013, with Örjan Hultén, Peter Danemo, Filip Augustsson)
- Örjan Hultén Orion – Radio In My Head (Artogrush 2010, with Örjan Hultén, Peter Danemo, Filip Augustsson)

With Georg Riedel:

- Secret Song (Diesel Music 2018, with Fredrik Ljungkvist, Mattias Ståhl, Pär-Ola Landin, Jon Fält)

With Calle Rasmusson:

- One (Prophone 2017, with Calle Rasmusson, Kristian Lind, Dalasinfoniettan)

With Gavin Bryars:

- 11th Floor (After Film Noir) (GB Records 2024, with Lisa Långbacka, Nils Berg, Dan Berglund)

With the Norrbotten Big Band:

- Göran Strandberg & NBB – Going North (Prophone 2019)
- Anne-Mette Iversen & NBB – Everything In Between (Prophone 2018, with E.J. Strickland)
- Josefin Lindstrand & NBB – While We Sleep (Antfarm Records 2016)
- Peter Danemo & NBB – Hedvigsnäs (Prophone 2016)
- Håkan Broström & NBB feat. Marilyn Mazur – Episodes From The Future And The Past (Art Of Life Records, 2014)
- Jan Allan & NBB – Jan Allan 80 (Prophone 2014)
- Georg Riedel & NBB – Emil, Pippi, Karlsson & Co. (Naxos, 2013, with Sarah Riedel)
- Outi Tarkiainen & NBB – Into The Woodland Silence (Fredriksson Music 2013, with Aili Ilkonen)
