= Mike Gibbs + Twelve play Gil Evans =

Mike Gibbs + 12 Play Gil Evans

Studio album by Mike Gibbs
- Released: 12 August 2013
- Genre: Jazz
- Label: Whirlwind Recordings
- Producer: Mike Gibbs, Hans Koller, Michael Janisch & Alex Bonney

Mike Gibbs + Twelve play Gil Evans is an album by composer Mike Gibbs. It was released on 12 August 2013 on Whirlwind Recordings.

== Track listing ==
1. "Bilbao Song" (Kurt Weill) (as arranged by Gil Evans)
2. "Las Vegas Tango" (Gil Evans)
3. "Ida Lupino" (Carla Bley)
4. "Feelings & Things" (Michael Gibbs)
5. "Sister Sadie" (Horace Silver) (as arranged by Gil Evans)
6. "Spring is Here" (Richard Rodgers, Lorenz Hart) (as arranged by Gil Evans)
7. "Ramblin’" (Ornette Coleman)
8. "St. Louis Blues" (W.C. Handy) (as arranged by Gil Evans)
9. "Tennis, Anyone?" (Michael Gibbs)
10. "Wait till You See Her" (Richard Rodgers, Lorenz Hart) (as arranged by Gil Evans)

== Personnel ==
- Mike Gibbs - Arranger and conductor
- Finn Peters - Alto Saxophone, Flutes
- Julian Siegel - Tenor & Soprano Saxophones, Bass Clarinet
- Lluis Mather - Tenor Saxophone, Clarinets
- Percy Pursglove, Robbie Robson, Joe Aukland - Trumpet
- Jim Rattigan - French horn
- Mark Nightingale - Trombone
- Sarah Williams - Bass trombone, tuba
- Hans Koller - Piano
- Michael Janisch - Double bass
- Jeff Williams - Drums

== Production ==
- Produced by Mike Gibbs, Hans Koller, Michael Janisch & Alex Bonney
- Engineer: Alex Bonney
- Edited by Alex Bonney, March 2013
- Mixed & Mastered by Tyler McDiarmid, NYC March 2013
- Executive Producer - Michael Janisch
