= Oscar Peñas =

Spanish jazz composer and guitarist

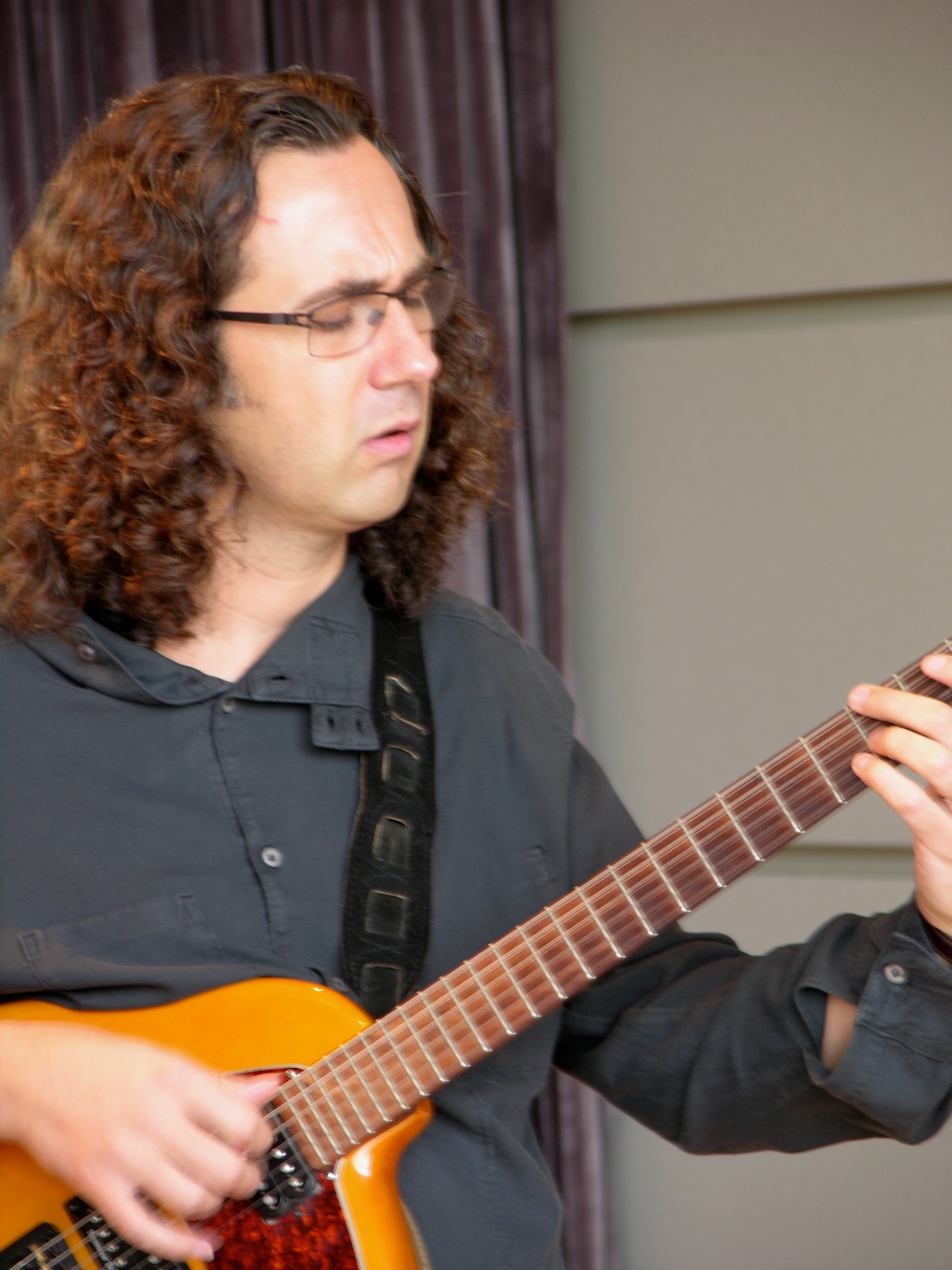
- BAM performance on September 6, 2012.

Background information
- Born: Oscar Peñas Cambray; August 13, 1972 (age 53); Barcelona, Spain
- Genres: Jazz, classical, crossover, minimalist
- Occupations: guitarist, composer, producer
- Instruments: electric and nylon guitar
- Years active: 1994–present
- Labels: Fresh Sound, Brooklyn Jazz Underground, Musikoz
- Website: Official website

Oscar Peñas Cambray (born August 13, 1972) is a jazz bandleader and composer-guitarist. He has been living in New York since 2007.

== Biography ==
Oscar Peñas is a composer and guitarist born in Barcelona, Spain. He is known for leading small ensembles, composing, and organic fingerpicking. Peñas began his musical journey at eight, receiving training in classical guitar. He later attended the Taller de Músics and swapped to jazz while studying law at seventeen. During a visit to the USA 1997, he dropped out of law school in Barcelona and enrolled in a Professional Music program at Berklee College of Music. After graduating in 1999, he returned to his native Barcelona, Spain, where he led the Oscar Peñas Group (a.k.a. Astronautus). He recorded Astronautus (2003) and The Return of Astronautus (2005) with this group, both under the same label, Fresh Sound New Talent, and toured in Europe. In 2005, Peñas was awarded a scholarship to pursue a Master's degree in Music, Jazz Studies Performance at New England Conservatory. In 2007, he completed his musical education in Boston and moved to New York City. Oscar Peñas is an independent artist known for his innovative and organic style, no-flashing finger-picking. Peñas produces and arranges his music work and releases his music through his record label, Musikoz. He has received grants from Mid Atlantic USAI [2021], South Arts Jazz Road [2022], and New York State Council on the Arts [2024], which speak to his exceptional talent and dedication to his craft. In 2018, he debuted his innovative jazz-classical suite with an eight-piece ensemble at the BAM Next Wave Festival. Oscar's suite "Almadraba" receive a successful concert review for his performance at Aaron Davis Hall, City College Center for the Arts.

== Discography ==
- Chicken or Pasta [Musikoz, 2023] features, Mike Stern Greg Leisz
- Almadraba [Musikoz, 2022] features, Ron Carter
- Music of Departures and Returns [Musikoz, 2014] features, Esperanza Spalding, Paquito D'Rivera, Gil Goldstein
- From Now On [Brooklyn Jazz Underground, 2011] features, Gil Goldstein
- The Return of Astronautus [Fresh Sound New Talent, 2005]
- Astronautus [Fresh Sound New Talent, 2003]

== See also ==
- List of people from Harlem
