= All One =

2023 studio album by Ben Wendel

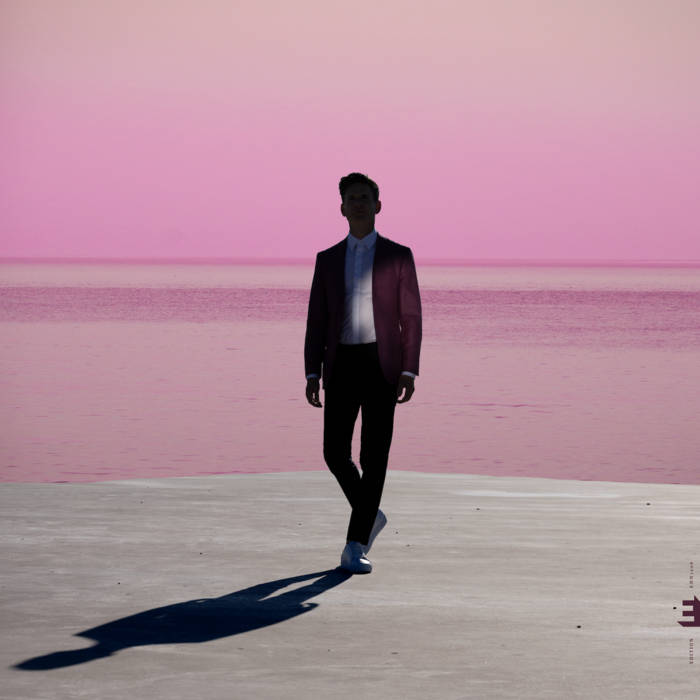

Studio album by Ben Wendel
- Released: April 21, 2023
- Recorded: Fall 2020 – March 2022
- Studio: Various locations
- Genre: Jazz
- Length: 42:18
- Label: Edition; EDN 1206 LP/CD
- Producer: Ben Wendel

Ben Wendel chronology
High Heart (2020)	All One (2023)	Understory: Live at the Village Vanguard (2024)

All One is a 2023 studio album by saxophonist and composer Ben Wendel. The album, released under the Edition label, features various artists on each track, including Bill Frisell, Cécile McLorin Salvant, Terence Blanchard, José James, Elena Pinderhughes, and Tigran Hamasyan. It was nominated for Best Contemporary Instrumental Album at the 66th Grammy Awards.

== Reception ==
Jerome Wilson, writing for All About Jazz, said about the album, "Wendel has shown his ability as a player before but the concept and arranging of this ambitious project is new territory for him. He creates a lot of stimulating settings for his collaborators to work with and emerges with lovely and distinctive music." Josef Woodard of DownBeat magazine called it "a prime case of a highly technology-enabled project that also breathes and feels organic".

Professional ratings
Review scores
Source	Rating
All About Jazz	3.5/5 stars

== Track listing ==
All tracks are written by Ben Wendel except where noted.

No.	Title	Writer(s)	Length
1.	"I Loves You Porgy" (feat. Cécile McLorin Salvant)	George Gershwin; Ira Gershwin	5:40
2.	"Wanderers" (feat. Terence Blanchard)		7:33
3.	"Throughout" (feat. Bill Frisell)	Bill Frisell	6:48
4.	"Speak Joy" (feat. Elena Pinderhughes)		7:45
5.	"Tenderly" (feat. José James)	Walter Gross; Jack Lawrence	6:30
6.	"In Anima" (feat. Tigran Hamasyan)		8:02
Total length:			42:18

== Personnel ==
- Ben Wendel – tenor and soprano saxophones, bassoon, hand percussion, effects
- Cécile McLorin Salvant – vocals (1)
- Terence Blanchard – trumpet (2)
- Bill Frisell – electric and acoustic guitars (3), effects
- Elena Pinderhughes – flute and alto flute (4)
- José James – vocals (5)
- Tigran Hamasyan – piano (6)
- Steve and Beth Wood – hand percussion

== Production ==
All One was produced by Wendel and mastered by Nate Wood at Kerseboom Mastering in Queens, New York, on June 16, 2022. Steve Wood mixed the album at Benaji Studio in Laguna Beach, California, November 16–20, 2021 and March 27–31, 2022. The album's cover artwork was designed by Oli Bentley and Split, with photography by Anouk van Kalmthout.
