= Understory: Live at the Village Vanguard =

2024 live album by Ben Wendel

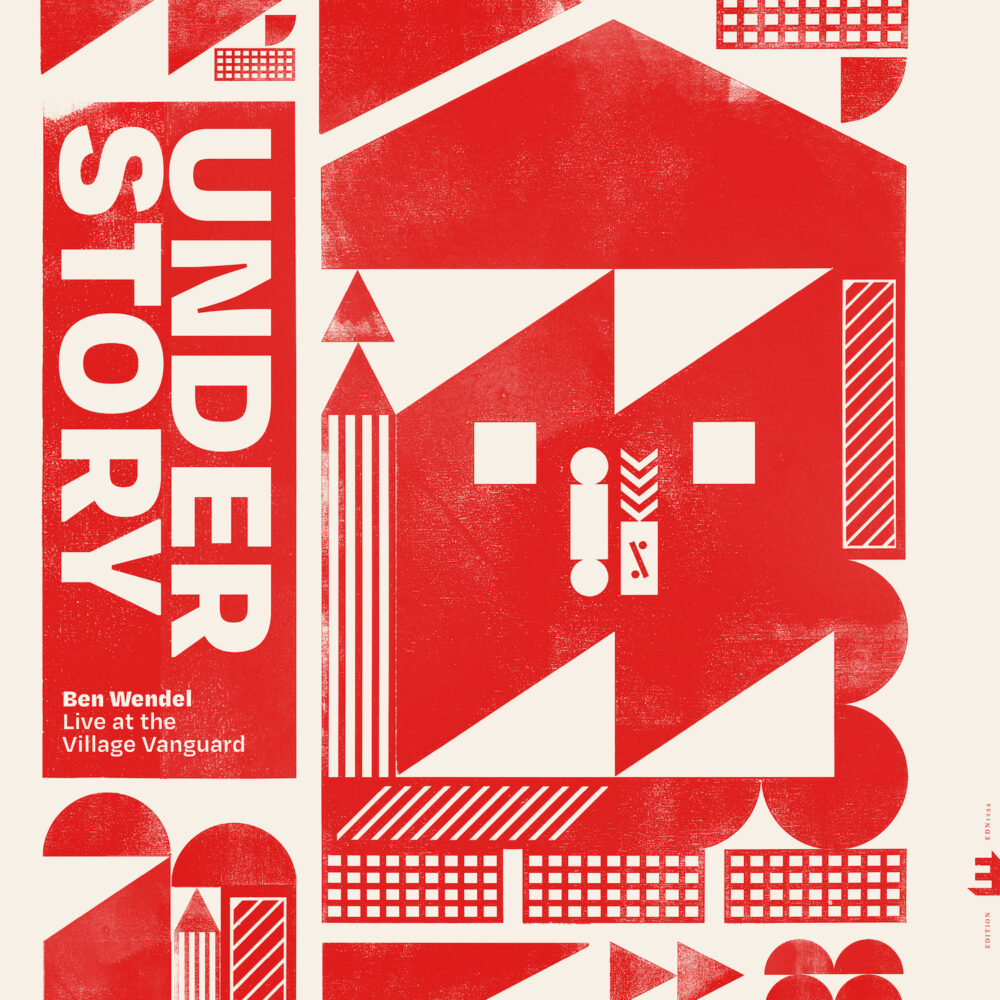

Live album by Ben Wendel
- Released: October 4, 2024
- Recorded: November 4–6, 2022
- Venue: Village Vanguard, New York City
- Genre: Neo-bop
- Length: 72:06
- Label: Edition Records; EDN 1254 LP/CD
- Producer: Ben Wendel

Ben Wendel chronology
All One (2023)	Understory: Live at the Village Vanguard (2024)	Barcode (2026)

Understory: Live at the Village Vanguard is a live album by saxophonist Ben Wendel, featuring pianist Gerald Clayton, bassist and vocalist Linda May Han Oh, and drummer Obed Calvaire, released on October 4, 2024. It was recorded at the Village Vanguard in New York City, a historically significant venue in jazz. The album documents a live performance showcasing the quartet's collaborative approach and musical interaction. Wendel described the recording as "something that really acknowledges the history of the room". This album is Ben Wendel's first live album, following his studio release All One.

== Reception ==
Mike Hobart of the Financial Times praised it at release, stating that the ensemble's "playing is inspired".

== Track listing ==
All tracks are written by Ben Wendel except where noted.

No.	Title	Writer(s)	Length
1.	"Lu"		10:25
2.	"Proof"		11:01
3.	"On the Trail"	Ferde Grofé	9:56
4.	"Scosh"		10:26
5.	"Jean & Renata"		7:54
6.	"I Saw You Say"		8:00
7.	"Tao"		8:18
8.	"Song Song" (only available on vinyl)		7:26
Total length:			72:06

== Personnel ==
Musicians

- Ben Wendel – saxophone, effects
- Gerald Clayton – piano
- Linda May Han Oh – bass, vocals
- Obed Calvaire – drums

Technical personnel

- Ben Wendel – producer
- Dave Stapleton & Tom Korkidis – executive producers
- Chris Allen – recording, mixing
- Andre Kochinka – assistant engineer
- Nate Wood at Kerseboom Mastering – mastering
- Oli Bentley, Split – album artwork
- Josh Goleman – photographer
