= The Seasons (album) =

2018 studio album by Ben Wendel

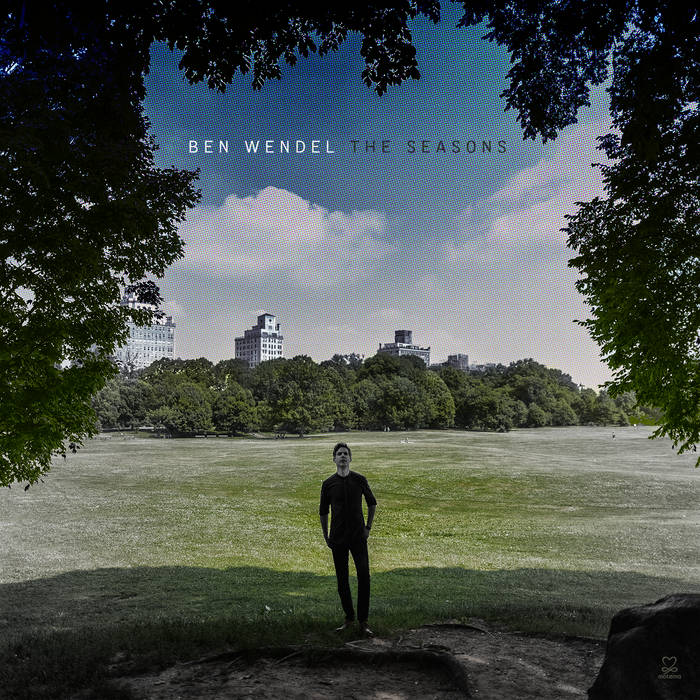

Studio album by Ben Wendel
- Released: October 12, 2018
- Recorded: March 5–7, 2018
- Studio: Bunker Studios, Brooklyn, New York
- Genre: Jazz
- Length: 78:39
- Label: Motéma Music; MTM 0288
- Producer: Ben Wendel

Ben Wendel chronology
| What We Bring (2016) | The Seasons (2018) | High Heart (2020) |

The Seasons is a studio album by saxophonist Ben Wendel, released on October 12, 2018 for the label Motéma Music. It is a project based on the YouTube video series "The Seasons", which Wendel modeled after Tchaikovsky's solo piano suite The Seasons. Each track on the album was inspired by a specific month and a different artist who has influenced Wendel's vision.

== Concept ==
The Seasons references Tchaikovsky's 1875–1876 solo piano compositions of the same name and serves as a commentary on the concept of time, technology and the way artists communicate.

Wendel began writing music for this record in 2015. He set about writing and performing twelve duets and videos featuring musicians he admired, including Shai Maestro, Joshua Redman, Julian Lage, Matt Brewer, Eric Harland, and vocalist Luciana Souza. Each track has a different video posted in a unique setting. Wendel released a different YouTube video for each month of the year, and later released this video project as a full album.

== Reception ==
Professional ratings
Review scores
| Source | Rating |
|---|---|
| All About Jazz | 4/5 stars |

Nate Chinen for The New York Times stated: "What's most impressive about the suite is how mindfully he set the table for each duet: 'November' captures the lyrical ease in Mr. Parks's pianism, while 'August' is an étude distilled from the intervallic language of the tenor saxophonist Mark Turner." Mike Jurkovic of All About Jazz, wrote: "With this new imagining, Wendel assembles a pulse-quickening quintet backed by the rhythmic muscle of Brewer and Harland as well as two more of his duet partners, Gilad Hekselman and Aaron Parks. Together, they're gale force."

== Track listing ==
All tracks are written by Ben Wendel.

| No. | Title | Length |
|---|---|---|
| 1. | "January" | 6:47 |
| 2. | "February" | 6:48 |
| 3. | "March" | 6:15 |
| 4. | "April" | 6:39 |
| 5. | "May" | 6:36 |
| 6. | "June" | 5:00 |
| 7. | "July" | 6:07 |
| 8. | "August" | 6:51 |
| 9. | "September" | 3:59 |
| 10. | "October" | 6:16 |
| 11. | "November" | 6:34 |
| 12. | "December" | 10:47 |
| Total length: | | 78:39 |

== Personnel ==
Music

- Ben Wendel – saxophone, bassoon (1, 3, 7, 12), effects
- Aaron Parks – piano
- Gilad Hekselman – guitar
- Matt Brewer – bass
- Eric Harland – drums

Production

- Aaron Nevezie – house engineer
- Todd Burke – mixing engineer
- Nate Wood at Kerseboom Mastering, NY – mastering
- James Carney – piano tuning
- Josh Goleman – photography
- Rebecca Meek – package design
- Rachel Silton – project manager
- Jason Byrne – publicity
- Tom Korkidis – management
- Alycia Mack – booking North America
- Holly Brennock – booking Europe/international
- Alex Chaloff – videography (for original video format)
