= Ben Wendel =

Canadian jazz musician (born 1976)

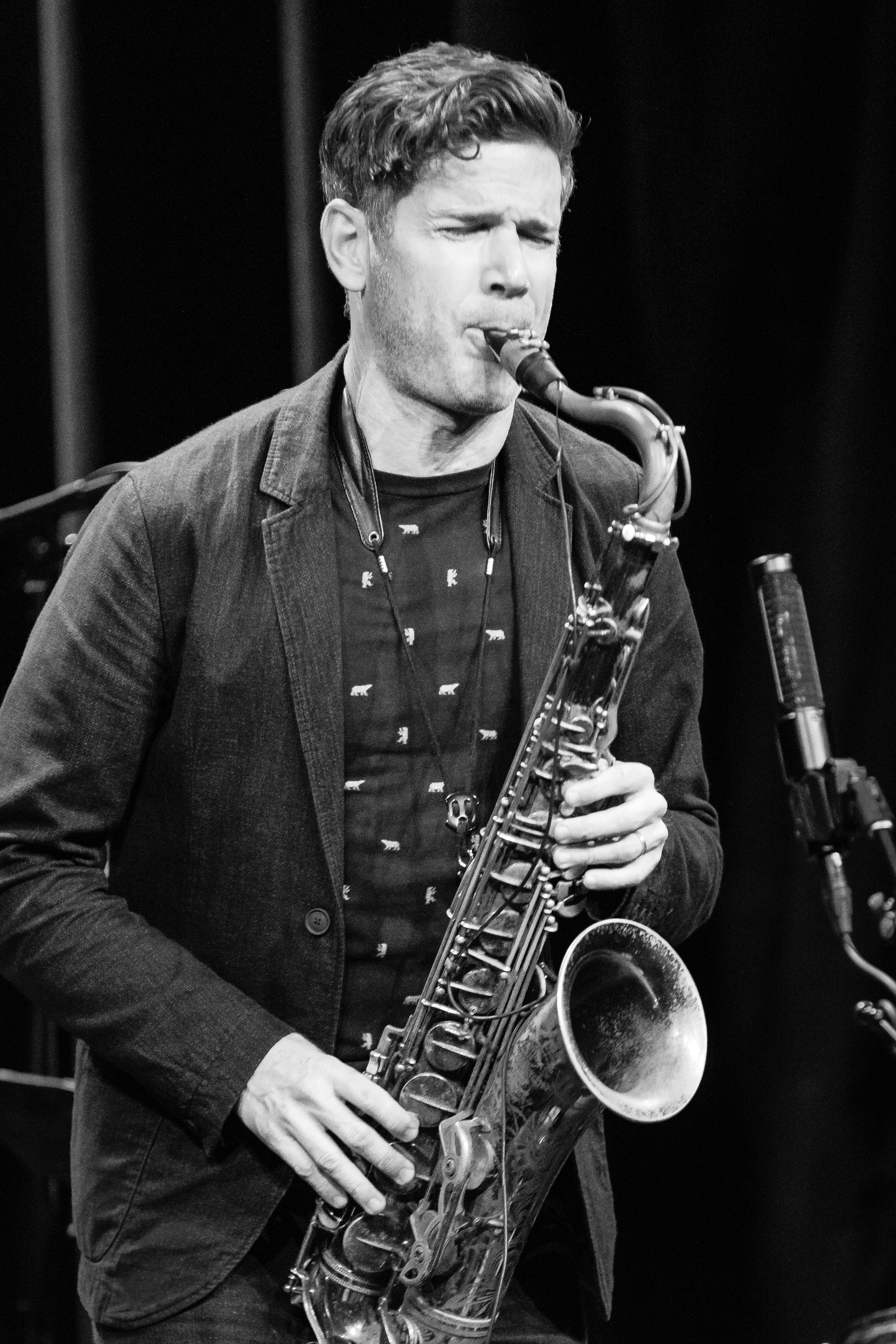
- Wendel performing in 2022

Background information
- Born: February 20, 1976 (age 50); Vancouver, British Columbia, Canada
- Genre: Jazz
- Occupation: Musician
- Instruments: Saxophone; bassoon; piano
- Years active: 2000s–present
- Labels: Sunnyside; Motéma; Edition; Brainfeeder; Concord
- Member of: Kneebody
- Website: benwendel.com

Ben Wendel (born February 20, 1976) is a Canadian-American jazz saxophonist, bassoonist, and pianist who is a founding member of the band Kneebody. He has worked with Ignacio Berroa, Tigran Hamasyan, Bill Frisell, Terence Blanchard, Antonio Sanchez, Gerald Clayton, Taylor Eigsti, Linda May Han Oh, Eric Harland, Moonchild, Louis Cole, Daedelus, Snoop Dogg, and Prince.

== Career ==
Wendel was born in Vancouver, British Columbia, Canada and raised in Los Angeles. Highlights include multiple domestic and international tours with artists such as Ignacio Berroa, Tigran Hamasyan, Bill Frisell, Terence Blanchard, Antonio Sanchez, Gerald Clayton, Taylor Eigsti, Linda May Han Oh, Eric Harland, Moonchild, Louis Cole, Daedelus, Snoop Dogg and Prince. Ben is a founding member of the Grammy nominated jazz-fusion group Kneebody. As a composer, he has received an ASCAP Jazz Composer Award, the 2008 and 2011 Chamber Music America New Works Grant, and the Victor Lynch-Staunton award by the Canada Council for the Arts. He co-wrote the score for John Krasinski's adaptation of David Foster Wallace's Brief Interviews with Hideous Men. He worked with conductor Kent Nagano in producing concerts for the Festspiel Plus in Munich, Germany. From 2008 to 2015, he produced a multi-genre performance series at the Broad Stage in Santa Monica, California. During that time he was appointed the head of their Jazz and Blues initiative. As part of this appointment, he helped to create an artistic council which included Quincy Jones, Herb Alpert, and Luciana Souza. Wendel has taught jazz at the University of Southern California and The New School in New York City.

In 2024, Wendel received a Grammy Award nomination of Best Contemporary Instrumental Album for his 2023 album entitled All One.

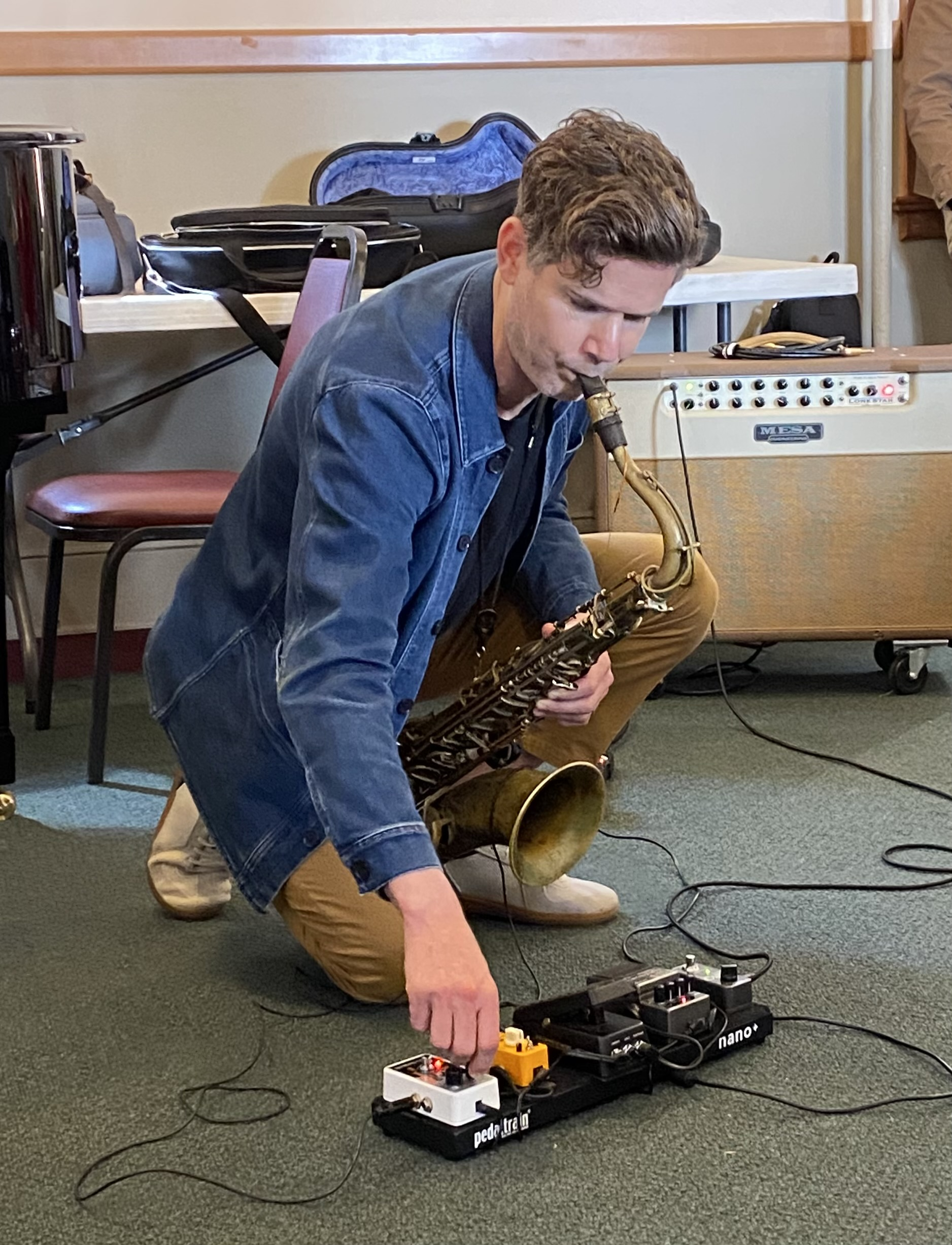
Wendel demonstrating effects pedals in a masterclass at Centrum Jazz Port Townsend workshop, July 26, 2024

== Discography ==
=== As leader or co-leader ===
- Simple Song (Sunnyside, 2009)
- Frame (Sunnyside, 2012)
- Small Constructions (Sunnyside, 2013)
- What We Bring (Motéma, 2016)
- The Seasons (Motéma, 2018)
- High Heart (Edition, 2020)
- All One (Edition, 2023)
- Understory: Live at the Village Vanguard (Edition, 2024)
- Barcode (Edition, 2026)

With Kneebody

- Kneebody (Koch, 2005)
- Low Electrical Worker (Jazz Engine, 2007)
- Kneebody Live: Volume One (2007)
- Twelve Songs by Charles Ives (w/ Theo Bleckmann) (2009)
- Kneebody Live: Volume Two/Italy (2009)
- You Can Have Your Moment (Winter & Winter, 2010)
- Kneebody Live: Volume Three/Paris (2011)
- The Line (Concord, 2013) – recorded in 2012
- Kneedelus (Brainfeeder, 2016)
- Anti-Hero (Motéma, 2017)
- By Fire (2019)
- Chapters (Edition, 2019)
- Live at Le Crescent (2022)
- Reach (2025)

With ACT (Wendel, Harish Raghavan, and Nate Wood)

- ACT (2009)
- ACT II (2015)

=== As producer ===
With Darryl Holter

- 2018: Roots and Branches
- 2015: Radio Songs
- 2012: Crooked Hearts
- 2010: West Bank Gone
- 2009: Darryl Holter

With Kneebody + Daedelus

- 2015: Kneedelus

With David Cook

- 2023: Loyal Returns
- 2015: Scenic Design

With Dan Tepfer

- 2011: Goldberg Variations/Variations

=== As sideman ===
With Jeremy Dutton

- 2023: Anyone is Better Than Here

With Daedelus

- 2003: Meanwhile
- 2003: Live Airplane Food
- 2003: Invention (Plug Research)
- 2003: Tigerbeasts6 Inc.
- 2003: Adventure Time
- 2002: Spacesettings

With Next.Ape

- 2023: The Fourth Wall

With Tom Ollendorff

- 2023: Open House

With Terrace Martin

- 2023: Mind Your Business
- 2020: Terrace Martin's Gray Area

With Nabate Isles

- 2023: En Motion

With Fabia Mantwill Orchestra

- 2021: EM.PERIENCE

With Bruno Schorp

- 2021: The Depths

With Gerald Clayton

- Tributary Tales (Motéma, 2017)

With Matt Brewer

- 2016: Unspoken

With Romain Pilon

- 2015: The Magic Eye

With Guilhem Flouzat

- 2015: Portraits

With Phil Donkin

- 2015: The Gate

With Linda May Han Oh

- 2017: Walk Against Wind (Biophilia)
- 2013: Sun Pictures (Greenleaf Music)

With Philip Dizack

- 2013: Single Soul

With Moonchild

- 2012: Be Free

With Todd Sickafoose

- 2008: Tiny Resistors (Cryptogramophone)
- 2006: Blood Orange (Secret Hatch)

With Tigran Hamasyan

- 2015: Mockroot (Nonesuch)
- 2014: Shadow Theater (Verve)
- 2008: Arrata Rebirth
- 2006: Word Passion

With Taylor Eigstei

- 2024: Bucket of F's
- 2008: Let It Come To You
- 2006: Lucky To Be Me (Concord Jazz)

With Otmaro Ruíz

- 2014: A Jazz Life

With Dakah Hip-Hop Orchestra

- 2023: Unfinished Symphony
- 2004: Dakah Live @ Grand Performances
- 2002: Scion Sampler
- 2002: Live @ The North Beach Jazz Festival

With Adam Rudolph

- 2004: Go Orchestra Web of Light (Meta)
- 2002: Go: Organic Orcehstra Vol. 01

With Good Charlotte:

- 2007: Good Morning Revival

With Marco Antonio Solís

- 2003: Trozos De Mi Alma

With Michael Whittaker

- 2006: Modern World

With Atlantiquity

- 2005: Kleeer

With Jason Mraz

- 2002: Waiting For My Rocket To Come

With Evgeny Pobozhiy

- 2022: Elements For Peace

With others

- Christina Aguilera & Cher, Burlesque (RCA, 2010)
- Busdriver, Perfect Hair (Big Dada, 2014)
- Shane Endsley, 2nd Guess (Endsley Music, 2002)
- Joel Harrison, Infinite Possibility (Sunnyside, 2013)
- The Long Lost, The Long Lost (Ninja Tune, 2009)
- Ross McHenry, Nothing Remains Unchanged (First Word, 2020)
- Melissa Morgan, Until I Met You (Telarc, 2009)
- Jason Mraz, Waiting for My Rocket to Come (Elektra, 2002)
- Josh Nelson, I Hear a Rhapsody (Steel Bird Music, 2009)
- Austin Peralta, Endless Planets (Brainfeeder, 2011)
