= Simple Song (album) =

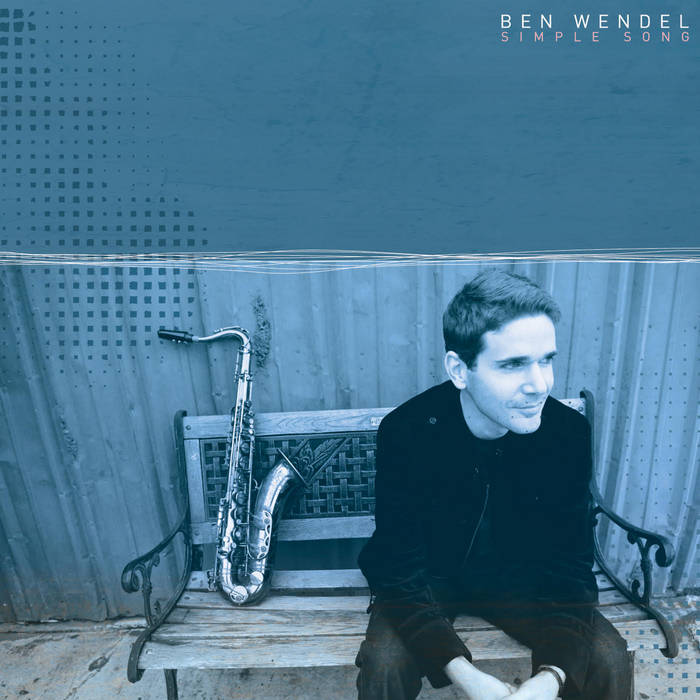

Studio album by Ben Wendel
- Released: March 24, 2009
- Recorded: June, 2007
- Studio: Castle Oaks Studio, Los Angeles
- Genre: Contemporary jazz; neo-bop
- Length: 67:40
- Label: Sunnyside Records; SSC 1216
- Producer: François Zalacain

Ben Wendel chronology
Simple Song (2009)	Act (2009)

Simple Song is a contemporary jazz album by Canadian saxophonist Ben Wendel, released on March 24, 2009. His debut as leader, it features a collection of neo-bop jazz compositions.

Guest musicians on the album include pianists Tigran Hamasyan, Taylor Eigsti, and Adam Benjamin, with guitarist Larry Koonse, bassist Darek Oleszkiewicz, and drummer Nate Wood.

== Reception ==
Professional ratings
Review scores
Source	Rating
All About Jazz	4.5/5 stars
AllMusic	4/5 stars

Michael Nastos of AllMusic wrote, "these are complex, intricate composed pieces requiring a good deal of rehearsal, and it sounds like they got them right for the recording session. With a combined sense of ease interacting and a great sense of teamwork, this band brings to life a set of heady compositions perfectly suited for the time period at the end of the 2000s."

Raul d'Gama Rose of All About Jazz described the album as "anything but simple in its approach to the idiom of jazz, [with] Wendel sweep[ing] across a sonic landscape with invention [...] thus [having] been able to create a tonal palette of seemingly epic proportions as he pushes his reeds on an endless, dancing journey."

== Track listing ==
All tracks are written by Ben Wendel except where noted.

No.	Title	Writer(s)	Length
1.	"Breath"		4:43
2.	"Simple Song"		6:58
3.	"Not Yet"		5:53
4.	"Chorale"		1:30
5.	"No Thank You Mr. West"		7:07
6.	"Lonnie's Lament"	John Coltrane	8:45
7.	"Maupin"		5:43
8.	"Ralph"		8:16
9.	"A Flower Is a Lovesome Thing"	Billy Strayhorn	5:47
10.	"Trust Fall"		6:05
11.	"She Never Had"		6:53
Total length:			67:40

== Personnel ==
- Ben Wendel – tenor saxophone, bassoon, melodica
- Tigran Hamasyan (5, 6), Taylor Eigsti (1, 2, 7, 10) – piano
- Adam Benjamin – piano (3, 4, 8, 11), Rhodes piano
- Larry Koonse – guitar
- Darek Oleszkiewicz – bass
- Nate Wood – drums

== Production ==
- François Zalacain – executive producer
- Mike Aarvold – recording engineer, tracking
- Joe Gastwirt – mastering
- Steve Wood – mixing
- Paul R. Rivera Design – layout design
- Kim Fox – photography
