= What We Bring =

2016 studio album by Ben Wendel

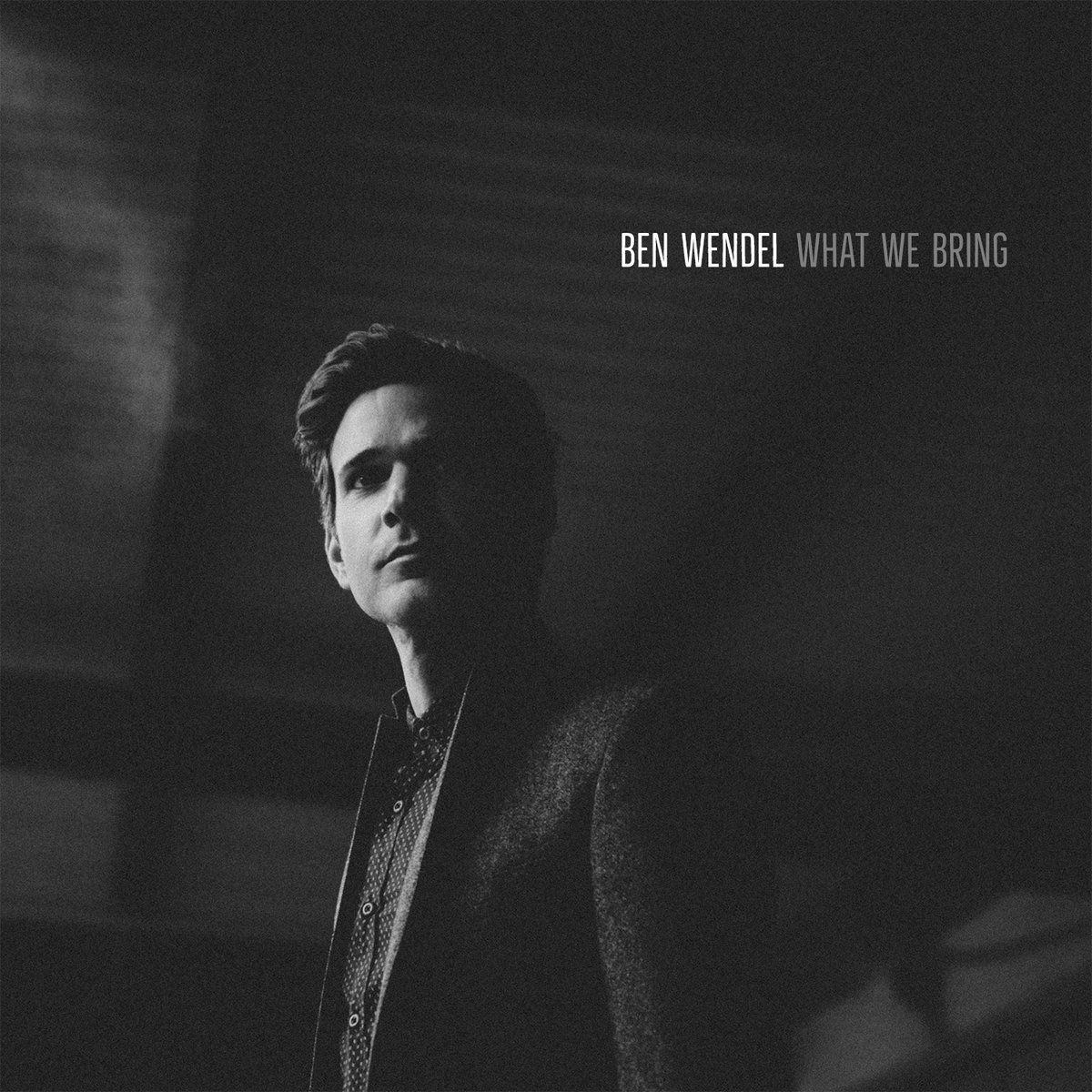

Studio album by Ben Wendel
- Released: September 9, 2016
- Recorded: June 8 & 9, 2014
- Studio: Bunker Studios, Brooklyn, New York
- Genre: Jazz
- Length: 46:26
- Label: Motéma Music; MTM 190

Ben Wendel chronology
Act II (2015)	What We Bring (2016)	The Seasons (2018)

What We Bring is the third album of saxophonist and composer Ben Wendel. Released by Motéma Music on September 9, 2016, it marks his debut with the label.

Wendel explained that the album's title "refers to the experience, inspiration and shared wisdom that musicians collect and absorb throughout their lives".

== Reception ==
Professional ratings
Review scores
Source	Rating
All About Jazz	3.5/5 stars

Britt Robson of JazzTimes stated: "What We Bring may be the most accessible record Wendel has ever made for straight-ahead jazz buffs. ...he has recruited seasoned and resourceful stylists... [who] fulfill his desire to create an emotional kinship with melodic songs he cherishes." Patrick Jarenwattananon, writing for NPR Music, complimented Wendel's rendition of Jenn Wasner's "Doubt", writing that it "adds vibrant, saturated color" while "preserv[ing] that devastating melody". Vincenzo Roggero of All About Jazz commented, "Wendel offers his personal perspective on the jazz that was and the jazz that will be, without fuss or revolution, with the brilliance and good taste that distinguish him".

== Track listing ==
All tracks are written by Ben Wendel except where noted.

No.	Title	Writer(s)	Length
1.	"Amian"		6:08
2.	"Fall"		4:31
3.	"Spring"		5:17
4.	"Doubt"	Jenn Wasner	4:55
5.	"Song Song"		6:23
6.	"Soli"		6:43
7.	"Austin"		5:50
8.	"Solar"	Chuck Wayne; Miles Davis	6:39
Total length:			46:26

== Personnel ==
- Ben Wendel – tenor saxophone, bassoon (1, 7)
- Gerald Clayton – piano
- Joe Sanders – bass
- Henry Cole – drums
- Nate Wood – percussion (1, 4)
