= High Heart =

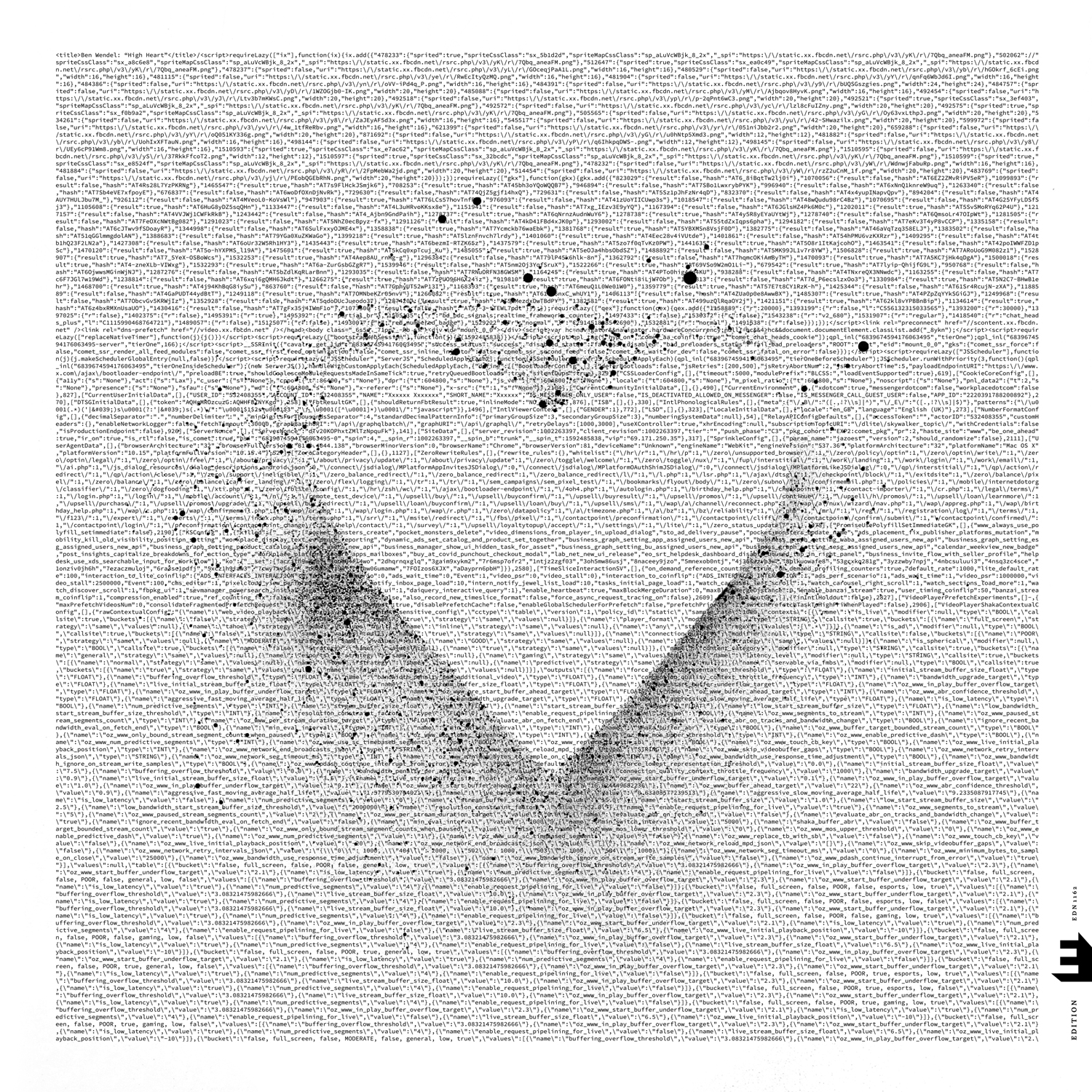

Studio album by Ben Wendel
- Released: October 30, 2020
- Recorded: January 7 & 8, 2019; Brooklyn, New York
- Genre: Jazz
- Length: 45:06
- Label: Edition; EDN 1162 LP/CD

Ben Wendel chronology
The Seasons (2018)	High Heart (2020)	All One (2023)

High Heart is the fifth studio album of saxophonist and composer Ben Wendel. It was released on October 30, 2020, under the Edition label.

The album is described as a personal statement and reflection of Wendel's journey "in a society of increasing complexity, oversaturation, and social imbalance [and one] that opens discussion and raises questions about how artists create art that is personal and meaningful in an increasingly impersonal time."

The album's cover artwork was designed by British designer, Oli Bentley. Every sleeve of the limited-edition colored vinyl run was individually hand painted before distribution.

Most recently, Wendel has toured with the High Heart Project, collaborating and featuring film maker, pianist, and new media artist, XUAN.

== Reception ==
Professional ratings
Review scores
Source	Rating
All About Jazz	4/5 stars
DownBeat	4/5 stars

Mike Jacobs, writing for All About Jazz, described it as a "standout album that is at once challenging, inspiring, and an advance—but most importantly, one that lives up to its title". James Hale of DownBeat added, "Wendel most often strikes a tone of uncertainty, if not outright anxiety. Call it brooding music for our times."

== Track listing ==
All tracks are written by Ben Wendel.

No.	Title	Length
1.	"High Heart"	6:38
2.	"Burning Bright"	6:08
3.	"Kindly"	7:08
4.	"Less"	3:51
5.	"Drawn Away"	7:14
6.	"Fearsome"	4:58
7.	"Darling"	5:52
8.	"Traveler"	3:17
Total length:		45:06

== Personnel ==
- Ben Wendel – tenor saxophone, bassoon, effects
- Michael Mayo – vocals, effects
- Shai Maestro – piano, Rhodes piano
- Gerald Clayton – piano, Rhodes piano
- Joe Sanders – upright bass
- Nate Wood – drums

== Production ==
- Oli Bentley – artwork design
- Nate Wood – tracking and mixing
- Nate Wood at Kerseboom Mastering, NY – mastering
