= Sunny Jain =

American drummer

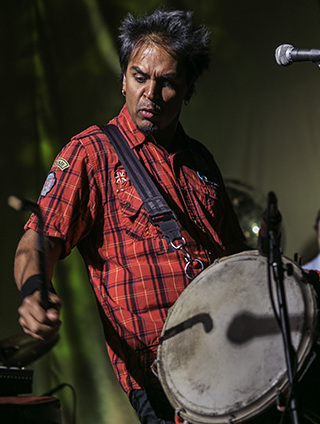
- Jain in 2012

Background information
- Born: 1975 (age 50–51); Rochester, New York, U.S.
- Genres: Jazz, world, bhangra, drum and bass
- Occupations: Musician, record producer
- Instruments: Dhol, drums, percussion
- Years active: 1993–present
- Label: Sinj
- Website: www.sunnyjain.com

Sunny Jain (born 1975) is an Indian American dhol player, drummer, and Indo jazz composer. He is recognized as a leading voice in the burgeoning movement of South Asian-American jazz musicians. His albums have received international acclaim for their "groundbreaking synthesis" (Coda Magazine), as he brings together the ancient sounds of his cultural heritage, jazz and a host of other sounds.

== Career ==
Jain has performed/recorded with Kiran Ahluwalia, Asphalt Orchestra, Joey Baron, Kenny Barron, Marc Cary, Samir Chatterjee, DJ Rekha, Kyle Eastwood, Peter Gabriel, Grupo Fantasma, Norah Jones, Junoon, Andres Levin, Rudresh Mahanthappa, MarchFourth Marching Band, Q-Tip, Soul Rebels, Martha Wainwright, Kenny Wollesen, and Himanshu Suri.

Jain has been a recipient of composition and performance grants from the Aaron Copland Music Fund, Chamber Music America, Meet the Composer, Mid-Atlantic Arts Foundation, and globalFEST, and received the Arts International Award in both 2003 and 2005 to enable touring India with his jazz group, Sunny Jain Collective. In 2002, Jain was designated a jazz ambassador by the U.S. Department of State and the Kennedy Center, for which he toured West Africa. Jain is the author of two instructional drum books for Alfred Publishing: The Total Jazz Drummer and Drum Atlas: India.

In 2007 Jain became the first artist endorser for India's largest and oldest musical manufacturer, Bina Music.

== Red Baraat ==
In 2008, Jain founded the Brooklyn bhangra band Red Baraat. In 2011 Red Baraat performed over 100 club shows and festivals across the world, including Bonnaroo Music Festival, High Sierra Music Festival, and a performance at the White House and the Paralympics closing ceremony in London. The band consists of dhol, drums, percussion, sousaphone, and horns, melding North Indian rhythm of bhangra with funk, go-go, Afro-Cuban, Brazilian, and jazz.

The group's debut album, Chaal Baby, was voted a top world-music album of 2010 by The Boston Globe. The group's 2011 follow-up album, Bootleg Bhangra, was recorded at Brooklyn's Southpaw concert on the band's second anniversary.

Red Baraat has performed at globalFEST, Montreal Jazz Festival, Sunfest, Festival De Louisiane, Quebec City Summer Festival, Chicago World Music Festival, Lincoln Center, The Kennedy Center, Madison World Music Festival, New Orleans Jazz Festival, SXSW Music Festival, Pori Jazz Festival (Finland), Molde Jazz Festival (Norway) and Chicago Folks & Roots Festival.

Red Baraat appeared on John Schaefer's Soundcheck WNYC-FM 93.9, an NPR affiliate, in which they were picked as a top live radio performance of 2009. They also recorded the credit roll theme song for the movie The Yes Men Fix the World and performed for the 2009 Mercedes-Benz Fashion Week (NYC) for Ports 1961 runway models. The group has been featured in National Geographic, The Wall Street Journal, The New Yorker, Relix, PopMatters, and Songlines.

The band has performed two Tiny Desk Concerts, one in 2012 and one in 2017.

== Junoon ==
Jain is also the drummer and dhol player for Junoon, the biggest rock band to emerge from South Asia. In 2011, they recorded the single "Open Your Eyes" featuring Peter Gabriel to raise awareness and funds for Pakistani flood victims. In 2010, Junoon delivered a Concert for Pakistan at the United Nations in NYC, for displaced refugees in the Swat Valley. The band closed out 2007 with a milestone performance at the Nobel Peace Prize concert in Oslo, Norway, playing for Nobel Laureates Al Gore and Rajendra Paucharia. Jain played dhol/percussion in the first Indian Broadway show, Bombay Dreams (2004), and made his Hollywood debut playing dhol in the movie The Accidental Husband, starring Uma Thurman, Colin Firth, and Isabella Rossellini.

== Wild Wild East ==
Jain is the band leader and drummer for the group Wild Wild East. Their first album was released in 2020 by Smithsonian Folkways. The group performed a Tiny Desk Concert for NPR in 2024.

== Discography ==
=== As leader ===
- As Is (NCM East, 2002)
- Mango Festival (Zoho 2004)
- Avaaz (SinJ, 2006)
- Taboo (Brooklyn Jazz Underground, 2010)
- Asphalt Orchestra with Asphalt Orchestra (Cantaloupe Music, 2010)

with Red Baraat

- Chaal Baby (SinJ, 2010)
- Bootleg Bhangra (SinJ, 2012)
- Shruggy Ji (SinJ, 2013)
- Bhangra Pirates (Rhyme & Reason, 2017)
- Sound The People (Rhyme & Reason, 2018)

with Wild Wild East

- Wild Wild East (Smithsonian Folkways, 2020)

=== As sideman ===
- Grupo Fantasma, American Music Vol. VII (Blue Corn Music, 2019)
- J. C. Hopkins, Underneath a Brooklyn Moon (Tigerlily, 2005)
- Michael Leonhart, Seahorse and the Storyteller (Truth & Soul, 2010)

== Written works ==
- Drum Atlas: India (Alfred Publishing)
- The Total Jazz Drummer (Alfred Publishing)
