= Taylor Eigsti =

American jazz pianist and composer (born 1984)

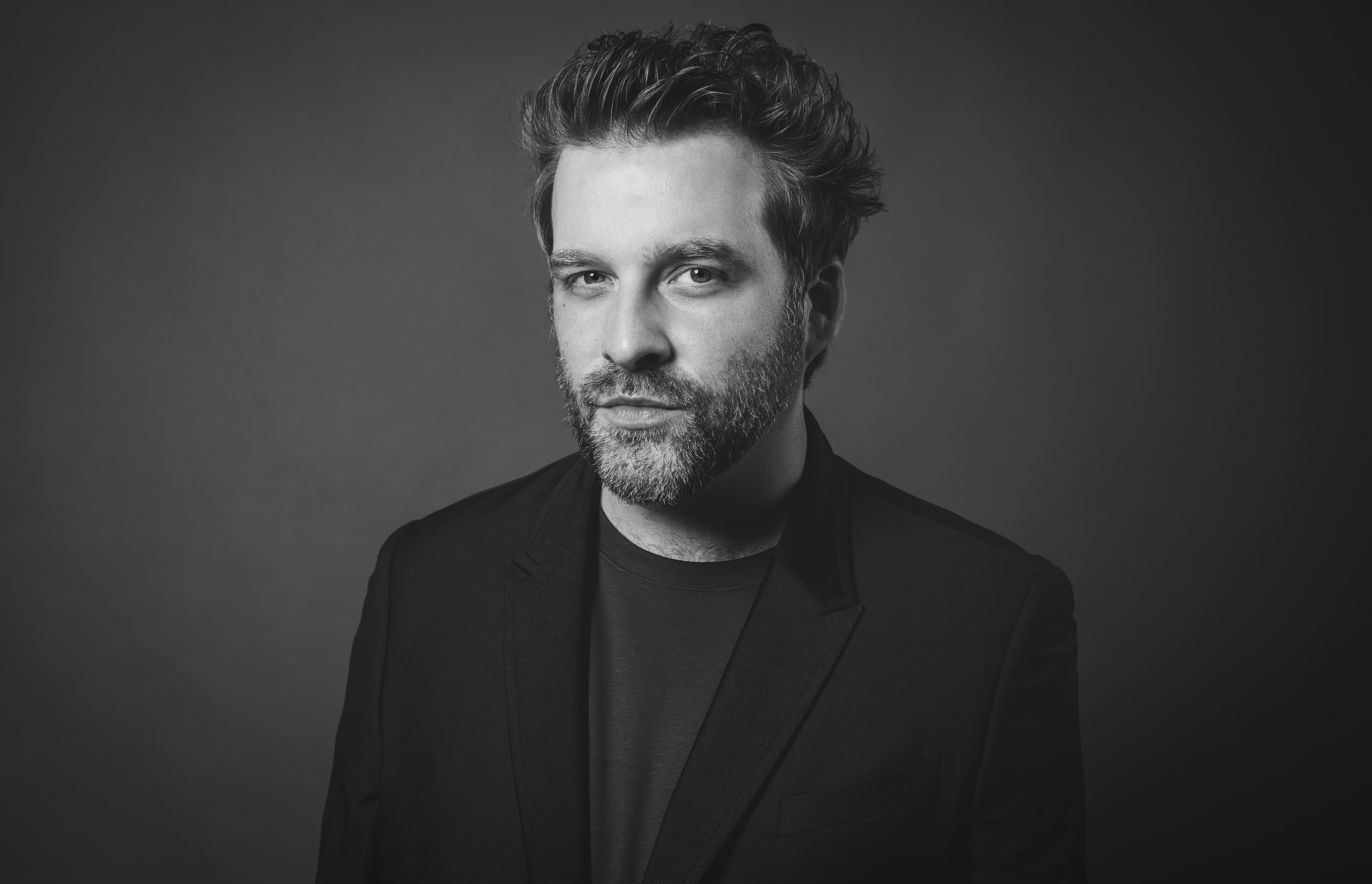
- Eigsti in 2020

Background information
- Born: September 24, 1984 (age 42); Menlo Park, California,
- Genre: Jazz
- Occupation: Musician
- Instrument: Piano
- Years active: 1993–present
- Labels: Concord, GSI
- Website: tayloreigsti.com

Taylor Eigsti (born September 24, 1984) is an American jazz pianist and composer. Eigsti's trio features bassist Harish Raghavan and drummer Eric Harland. He is also a member of Eric Harland's Voyager, Kendrick Scott's Oracle, and Gretchen Parlato's group.

A child prodigy, Eigsti has been a faculty member at the Stanford Jazz Workshop at Stanford University since age 15. Eigsti has twice won the Grammy Award for Best Contemporary Instrumental Album, for Tree Falls in 2023 and Plot Armor in 2025.

== Early life ==
Eigsti was born to Nancy and Steve Eigsti on September 24, 1984, and grew up in Menlo Park, California. When he was three, his 17-year-old sister, Shannon, died of cancer. Her death made a lasting impression and continued to influence Eigsti's musical development. Inspired by a memory of his sister playing music, Eigsti's study of piano began at age four. He graduated salutatorian of his high school class at Woodside Priory School, where he returned to give the commencement address in 2010. He then had a brief stint at the University of Southern California's Thornton School of Music before dropping out, midway through his sophomore year, to pursue his musical career.

== Musical career ==
Eigsti was quickly labeled a prodigy, and has since released 7 albums as a bandleader, in addition to appearing on over 50 albums as a sideman. Eigsti has garnered multiple individual GRAMMY Award nominations over the years for his work as a recording artist and composer, including Best Instrumental Composition, and Best Jazz Instrumental Solo. Eigsti also co-wrote a featured composition with Don Cheadle for the 2017 GRAMMY-winning soundtrack to the motion picture Miles Ahead.

Eigsti has traveled internationally with his trio and quartet, and has frequently performed as a sideman since moving to New York City in 2008. Eigsti has performed at the Hollywood Bowl, Carnegie Hall, Salle Pleyel, Red Rocks Amphitheatre, Royal Festival Hall, Konzerthaus, Vienna, Olympia Hall, Massey Hall, Lincoln Center for the Performing Arts, Louise M. Davies Symphony Hall, and many festivals including Montreal International Jazz Festival, North Sea Jazz Festival, Mosaic Music Festival (Singapore), Monterey Jazz Festival, Stockholm Jazz Festival, Istanbul International Jazz Festival, Quito Jazz Festival, Jakarta International Java Jazz Festival, Sydney Jazz Festival, Newport Jazz Festival, Chicago Jazz Festival, and the Toronto Jazz Festival.

Eigsti has also been featured numerous times in various television specials, NPR appearances, commercials, and composed the theme music to the motion picture Detachment, starring Oscar-winner Adrien Brody collaborating on the score with the Newton Brothers. In 2018, Eigsti was featured on a television special with Chris Botti for PBS's Great Performances.

Eigsti has performed, toured, or recorded with Dave Brubeck, Chris Botti, Joshua Redman, Julian Lage, David Benoit, Terence Blanchard, Becca Stevens, James Moody, Esperanza Spalding, Lisa Fischer, Ernestine Anderson, Red Holloway, Kurt Rosenwinkel, Diane Schuur, Ambrose Akinmusire, Ben Wendel, Marian McPartland, Christian McBride, Nicholas Payton, Joshua Bell, Chris Potter, Stefon Harris, Sting, John Mayer, Hank Jones, Chick Corea, Snarky Puppy, Vanessa Williams, McCoy Tyner, Joey DeFrancesco, Charles McPherson, Geoffrey Keezer, Eldar Djangirov, Joe Lovano, The Doobie Brothers, and Frederica von Stade, among many others.

In addition to leading and performing with various small ensembles, Eigsti frequently has had the opportunity to work with, compose for and orchestrate music for various symphony orchestras, and has written music for orchestra and jazz ensemble. Various soloist and compositional features include the San José Chamber Orchestra, Oakland Symphony, New York Philharmonic, the New York Pops, Chicago Symphony Orchestra, Colorado Symphony, Buffalo Philharmonic Orchestra, Naples Philharmonic, Nashville Symphony, Sacramento Philharmonic Orchestra, Boston Youth Symphony Orchestras, Pittsburgh Symphony Orchestra, Indianapolis Symphony Orchestra, San Jose Youth Symphony, Golden State Youth Orchestra, Bear Valley Music Festival Orchestra, Tassajara Symphony, Reno Philharmonic and multiple featured collaborations with the Peninsula Symphony Orchestra.

== Albums as a bandleader ==
Eigsti released his first album Tay's Groove at age 14. It featured Seward McCain on bass and Dan Brubeck on drums. Eigsti's second album, Live At Filoli, with John Shifflett on bass and Jason Lewis on drums, was recorded at a concert at Filoli Gardens on September 16, 2000. The trio played this concert as a last minute replacement for a Marian McPartland show. His third album, Taylor's Dream, was released in 2001 on DIW Records. Eigsti's first nationally released album was Resonance, recorded in 2003 and released on Bop City Records. It was the trio's third album together and peaked at number five in national jazz radio airplay.

Eigsti's first major label debut was titled Lucky To Be Me. It was released on Concord Records in 2006. Lucky To Be Me features Julian Lage on guitar, Christian McBride on bass, and Lewis Nash on drums. The album received two Grammy Award nominations – one for Best Instrumental Composition on for his song "Argument", and the other for Best Jazz Solo Performance on "Freedom Jazz Dance". The album met with critical acclaim, but it was also criticized for being uneven. In 2008 Eigsti released Let It Come To You, his second release with the Concord label. This album featured Julian Lage on guitar, Reuben Rogers on bass, Eric Harland on drums, Harish Raghavan on bass and Aaron McLendon on drums. Additionally, Joshua Redman, Edmar Castañeda, Dayna Stephens, Ben Wendel, and Evan Francis are featured as guests. Eigsti's next Concord album, Daylight at Midnight, was released on September 21, 2010. This album features vocalist Becca Stevens and several arrangements of contemporary popular artists like Rufus Wainwright, Imogen Heap, and Elliott Smith.

On May 21, 2021, Eigsti released Tree Falls through GSI records. The album features drummer Eric Harland, who co-owns the GSI label, vocalists Becca Stevens, Casey Abrams, and Gretchen Parlato, and bass guitarist David "DJ" Ginyard. The album won a Grammy for Best Contemporary Instrumental Album.

== Discography ==
=== As leader ===
Year recorded	Title	Label	Year released	Personnel/Notes
1998	Tay's Groove	DIW	1999	With Seward McCain (bass), Dan Brubeck (drums)
2000	Live at Filoli	DIW	2001	With John Shifflett (bass), Jason Lewis (drums); in concert
2001?	Taylor's Dream	DIW	2001	With John Shifflett (bass), Jason Lewis (drums)
2003?	Resonance	Bop City	2003	With John Shifflett (bass), Jason Lewis (drums)
2006	Lucky to Be Me	Concord	2006	With Julian Lage (guitar), Christian McBride (bass), Lewis Nash (drums), Billy Kilson (drums), James Genus (bass), Ben Wendel (sax), Eric Marienthal (sax), Adam Schroeder (sax), Garrett Smith (trombone), Greg Adams (trumpet)
2008	Let It Come to You	Concord	2008	With Julian Lage (guitar), Reuben Rogers (bass), Eric Harland (drums), Harish Raghavan (bass), Aaron McLendon (drums); plus Joshua Redman, Edmar Castaneda, Dayna Stephens, Ben Wendel, and Evan Francis as guests
2010	Daylight at Midnight	Concord	2010	With Becca Stevens (vocals), Harish Raghavan (bass, electric bass), Eric Harland (drums); plus Julian Lage (guitar) as guest
2020	Tree Falls	GSI	2021	With Casey Abrams (vocals), Gretchen Parlato (vocals), Becca Stevens (vocals), Charles Altura (guitar), Ben Wendel (woodwinds), Sam Sadigursky (woodwinds), David Ginyard (bass), Nathan Schram (viola), Hamilton Berry (cello), Emilie Gendron (violin), Eric Harland (drums)
2023	Plot Armor	GroundUP	2024	With Lisa Fischer (vocals), Gretchen Parlato (vocals), Becca Stephens (vocals), Terence Blanchard (trumpet), Ben Wendel (sax), Dayna Stephens (sax), Charles Altura (guitar), Julian Lage (guitar), Maya Kronfeld (piano), David "DJ" Ginyard (bass), Harish Raghavan (bass), Oscar Jeaton, Jr. (drums), Kendrick Scott (drums)

=== As sideman ===
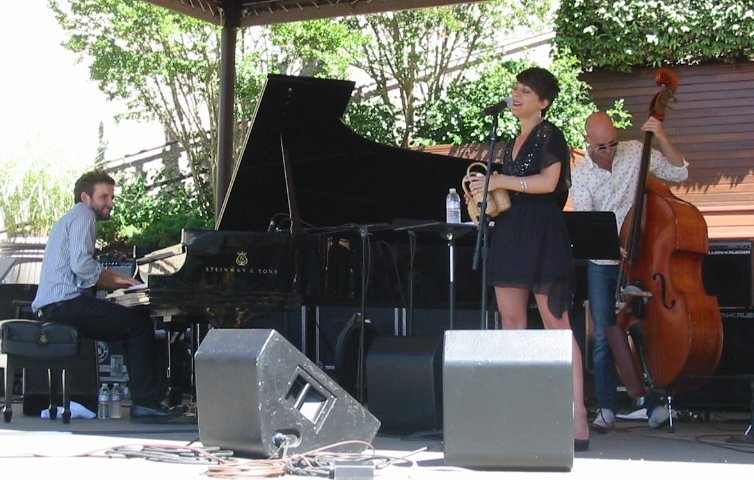
Eigsti in 2010 backing Gretchen Parlato on vocals, Alan Hampton on bass, and Kendrick Scott on drums

With Eric Harland

- Voyager: Live by Night (Space Time, 2011) – rec. 2008
- Vipassana (GSI, 2014)

With Gretchen Parlato

- The Lost and Found (ObliqSound, 2011)
- Live in NYC (Obliqsound, 2013)[CD, DVD-Video] – live

With Anton Schwartz

- Radiant Blue (Anton Jazz, 2006)
- Flash Mob (Anton Jazz, 2014)

With Kendrick Scott

- Conviction (Concord Jazz, 2013)
- We Are the Drum (Blue Note, 2015)
- A Wall Becomes a Bridge (Blue Note, 2019)

With Dayna Stephens

- The Timeless Now (CTA, 2007)
- That Nepenthetic Place (Sunnyside, 2013)

With others

- David Benoit, Jazz for Peanuts (Peak/Concord, 2008)
- Julian Lage, Sounding Point (EmArcy, 2009)
- Bongwool Lee, My Singing Fingers (Origin, 2018)
- Matt Slocum, With Love And Sadness (Sunnyside, 2022)
- J. D. Walter, Dressed in a Song (JWALREC, 2020)
- Ben Wendel, Simple Song (Sunnyside, 2009)
- Dann Zinn, Day of Reckoning (Origin, 2019)
