= Anne Mette Iversen =

Danish jazz bassist and composer (born 1972)

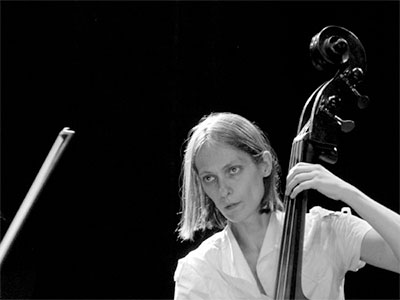
Anne Mette Iversen in Aarhus 2013

Anne Mette Iversen (born 1972) is a Danish jazz bassist and composer. She leads and composes for the Anne Mette Iversen Quartet / Quartet +1 as well as the groups Double Life, Poetry of Earth, and the Ternion Quartet. She has released 9 albums as a leader.

Iversen was Composer in Residence for the Norrbotten Big Band (Sweden) in 2016.

Iversen co-founded the Brooklyn Jazz Underground in 2006 and is co-owner of the related record label Brooklyn Jazz Underground Records, which was formed in 2008. She works as sideman in various settings and as freelance composer.

Iversen lived in New York City from 1998 to 2012 and is currently based in Berlin, Germany. She studied classical piano at the Royal Academy of Music in Aarhus, Denmark and bass at the Rhythmic Conservatory of Music in Copenhagen, and The New School University in New York City.

Iversen's composing is recognized for her ability to integrate classical music with jazz ensembles, and she is influenced by major classical composers as well as jazz and Brazilian artists and composers.

== Discography ==
=== As leader or co-leader ===
- Arabian Underground with Arabian Underground (Zona/EMI, 1998)
- This Is My House (Okapi, 2006)
- A Portrait of Brooklyn with Brooklyn Jazz Underground (BJU, 2012)
- 7 x 7 with Brooklyn Jazz Underground (BJU, 2014)
- So Many Roads (BJU, 2014)
- Round Trip (BJU, 2016)
- Ternion Quartet (BJU, 2017)
- Everything in Between with Norrbotten Big Band (Prophone, 2018)
- Invincible Nimbus (BJU, 2019)
- Racing a Butterfly (BJU, 2020)
