= Patricia Brennan (musician) =

Mexican-American jazz vibraphonist

Patricia Brennan (born 1984 or 1985) is a Mexican-born American jazz composer, vibraphonist and marimbist. She is in the faculty of Jazz Arts program at Manhattan School of Music, the New School for Jazz and Contemporary Music and at the Jazz Studies program at NYU Steinhardt.

== Early life ==
Brennan was raised in Port of Veracruz, Mexico. As a child, she played percussion and piano, and at 15 was studying jazz composition. She moved to New York City in 2005.

== Career ==
Brennan's debut album Maquishti was released in 2021, followed by More Touch in 2022. Her third album Breaking Stretch was selected as Album of the Year by DownBeat critics in 2025. Of the Near and Far, her fourth album, was released in October of the same year and also was selected as Album of the Year by DownBeat critics, becoming only the fourth artist, along with Joe Henderson, Ornette Coleman, and Duke Ellington, to win that award two years in a row.
