= Brooklyn Jazz Underground =

American record label

Brooklyn Jazz Underground Records
- Founded: 2008
- Founder: Anne Mette Iversen, Alexis Cuadrado
- Genre: Jazz
- Country of origin: U.S.
- Location: New York City
- Official website: www.bjurecords.com

Brooklyn Jazz Underground is a jazz association founded in Brooklyn, New York, in 2007. The association was formed by ten musicians to promote their work. In 2008, Anne Mette Iversen and Alexis Cuadrado of the Brooklyn Jazz Underground started the sister company, the record label Brooklyn Jazz Underground Records.

Founding members of the association include Tanya Kalmanovitch, Alan Ferber, Alexis Cuadrado, Shane Endsley, Benny Lackner, Dan Pratt, Jerome Sabbagh, Anne Mette Iversen, Sunny Jain, and Ted Poor. In 2006, Kalmanovitch talked about the idea with Ferber and Cuadrado. They began their venture with performances at Smalls Jazz Club. Other activities that the BJU established and has hosted are weekly concert series at the Sycamore Bar & Flowershop and at The Tea Lounge, both in Brooklyn; a series of podcasts about the band members; benefits for schools; five CD samplers; the annual Brooklyn Jazz Underground Jazz Festival; and two albums as the Brooklyn Jazz Underground Ensemble, the CDs A Portrait of Brooklyn and 7x7.

The record label was founded in 2008 with the intent to give musicians more control over their work. Early albums included Puzzles by Alexis Cuadrado, Night for Day by Bernard Emer Lackner, and the double album Best of the West and Many Places by Anne Mette Iversen. Brooklyn Jazz Underground Records continued releasing albums steadily over the years, and by the beginning of 2019 they had 68 albums in their catalog.
