= First Meeting: Live in London, Volume 1 =

2014 live album by Lee Konitz, Dan Tepfer, Michael Janisch & Jeff Wiliams

Live album by Lee Konitz, Dan Tepfer, Michael Janisch & Jeff Williams
- Released: June 10, 2014
- Recorded: May 19 & 20, 2010
- Venue: PizzaExpress Jazz Club in Soho, London
- Genre: Jazz
- Length: 68:08
- Label: Whirlwind
- Producer: Michael Janisch; Lee Konitz

Lee Konitz chronology
Costumes Are Mandatory (2013)	First Meeting: Live in London, Volume 1 (2014)	Standards Live ~ At The Village Vanguard (2014)

First Meeting: Live in London, Volume 1 is a live album by saxophonist Lee Konitz, pianist Dan Tepfer, bassist Michael Janisch, and drummer Jeff Williams. It was released by Whirlwind Recordings on 10 June 2014.

== Reception ==
Professional ratings
Review scores
Source	Rating
DownBeat	4/5 stars
The Guardian	4/5 stars

John Fordham of The Guardian described Konitz's playing, with the words of composer John Zorn, as "brilliant, adventurous and original", explaining that on the album, "They use standard songs to get their bearings, but choose which and when and who plays what on the fly. [...] Tepfer, Janisch and Williams add up to a superb piano trio in their own right, and Konitz picks up their suggestions and supplies his own with his characteristically wispy, falling-leaves phrases, sly bebop figures and wincing, sweet-sour treble tone." James Hale, writing for DownBeat, stated: "this is a live recording that captures the essence of improvisational musical dialogue—dull spots and all."

== Track listing ==
No.	Title	Writer(s)	Length
1.	"Billie's Bounce"	Charlie Parker	9:20
2.	"All The Things You Are"	Jerome Kern; Oscar Hammerstein II	10:00
3.	"Stella by Starlight"	Victor Young	9:57
4.	"Giant Steps"	John Coltrane	11:37
5.	"Body & Soul"	Johnny Green	5:03
6.	"Alone Together"	Arthur Schwartz; Howard Dietz	14:08
7.	"Subconscious Lee"		6:08
8.	"Outro (Sweet & Lovely)"		1:55
Total length:			68:08

== Personnel ==
Music

- Lee Konitz – alto (1, 3, 7, 8) and soprano (2, 5, 6) saxophones
- Dan Tepfer – piano
- Michael Janisch – double bass
- Jeff Williams – drums

Production

- Michael Janisch – executive producer
- Lee Konitz – production
- Luc Saint-Martin – recording
- Tyler McDiarmid (NYC, January 2014) – mixing, mastering
