= Shane Endsley =

American drummer (born 1975)

Shane Endsley (born 1975) is an American trumpeter, drummer, and composer. He is a founding member of Kneebody, as well as an active leader and sideman with other New York City jazz musicians, as well as with pop and rock musicians such as Ani DiFranco and Pearl Jam.

== Background ==
Endsley was born in 1975 in Denver, Colorado, and studied trumpet, percussion, and composition at the Eastman School of Music, where he met the other members of Kneebody. Since then, he has toured and recorded with Ani DiFranco and Steve Coleman and has done work with Slavic Soul Party, Ralph Alessi, Tim Berne, Ravi Coltrane, John Hollenbeck and others in the downtown music and jazz scenes. He resides in Brooklyn.

== Discography ==
=== As leader ===
- 2nd Guess (Endsley Music, 2002)
- The Other (Low Electrical Records, 2011)

=== As co-leader ===
With Kneebody

- Kneebody (Koch, 2005)
- Low Electrical Worker (Jazz Engine, 2007)
- Kneebody Live: Volume One (2007)
- Twelve Songs by Charles Ives (w/ Theo Bleckmann) (2009)
- Kneebody Live: Volume Two/Italy (2009)
- You Can Have Your Moment (Winter & Winter, 2010)
- Kneebody Live: Volume Three/Paris (2011)
- The Line (Concord, 2013) – recorded in 2012
- Kneedelus (Brainfeeder, 2016)
- Anti-Hero (Motema, 2017)
- By Fire (2019)
- Chapters (Edition, 2019)
- Live at Le Crescent (2022)
- Reach (2025)

=== As sideman ===
With Ralph Alessi

- Hissy Fit (Love Slave, 1999)
- Vice & Virtue (RKM Music, 2003)
- Anastomosi (Abeat, 2006)

With Steve Coleman

- Genesis & the Opening of the Way (RCA Victor, 1997)
- The Sonic Language of Myth (RCA Victor, 1999)
- The Ascension to Light (BMG, 2001)

With Ani DiFranco

- Revelling/Reckoning (Righteous Babe, 2001)
- So Much Shouting So Much Laughter (Righteous Babe, 2002)
- Evolve (Righteous Babe, 2003)

With others

- Ben Allison, Think Free (Palmetto, 2009)
- Asphalt Orchestra, Asphalt Orchestra (Cantaloupe Music, 2010)
- Au Revoir Simone, The Bird of Music (Our Secret, 2007)
- Jamie Baum, Solace (Sunnyside, 2008)
- David Binney, Oceanos (Criss Cross, 2007)
- Theo Bleckmann, Kneebody, Twelve Songs by Charles Ives (Winter & Winter, 2008)
- Michael Cain, Indira (ONOFF, 2005)
- Steve Cardenas, Melody in a Dream (Sunnyside, 2013)
- Ana Egge, Out Past the Lights (Grace, 2004)
- Ana Egge, Road to My Love (Grace, 2009)
- John Ellis, Mobro (Parade Light, 2014)
- John Escreet, Sabotage and Celebration (Whirlwind, 2013)
- Michael Formanek, The Distance (ECM, 2016)
- Joel Harrison, Passing Train (Tuition, 2008)
- Matt Keating, Wrong Way Home (Sojourn, 2011)
- Donny McCaslin, Soar (Sunnyside, 2006)
- Michael McGinnis, Tangents (RKM Music, 2001)
- Jason Mraz, Waiting for My Rocket to Come (Elektra, 2002)
- Todd Sickafoose, Tiny Resistors (Cryptogramophone 2008)
- Ohad Talmor, Newsreel (Auand, 2011)
- Ohad Talmor, Long Forms (Intakt, 2020)
- Kate Schutt, Telephone Game (ArtistShare, 2008)
- Slavic Soul Party!, Bigger (Barbes, 2005)
- Slavic Soul Party!, Taketron (Barbes, 2009)
- Denin Slage-Koch, It Comes in Waves (2023)
