= Michael Janisch (musician) =

American bassist, producer, and composer

- Born: February 2, 1979 (age 47); Ellsworth, Wisconsin, US
- Genres: Avant-garde jazz, experimental, soul, funk
- Occupations: Musician, record label owner, producer, composer
- Instruments: Double bass, electric bass
- Years active: 1999-present
- Label: Whirlwind
- Website: www.michaeljanisch.com

Michael Janisch (born February 2, 1979) is an American bassist, producer, composer and the owner of the record label Whirlwind Recordings. He was nominated for a MOBO Award in 2016 in the category Best Jazz Act.

== Life and career ==
Born in Red Wing, Minnesota and raised in Ellsworth, Wisconsin, Janisch started playing piano at age four and electric bass at age 10. He was equally active in sports throughout his teenage years, mainly American football and track and field, and after high school received a scholarship to attend Minnesota State University, Mankato where he majored in history and played football (running back) and ran track and field (sprinter).

An injury in his third season prompted his return to music and a transfer to University of Wisconsin–La Crosse, where he concentrated on double bass. In 2000, he accepted a scholarship to the Berklee College of Music in Boston. After earning a degree, Janisch relocated to New York City and soon after London, England, the result of meeting his English wife Sarah.

In November 2008, Janisch, along with co-leader and alto saxophonist Patrick Cornelius released Traveling Song the debut and only album from the TransAtlantic Collective (TAC), a contemporary jazz ensemble that operated on the international scene during the years 2005-2009, and in that time performed concerts across the US, UK and Europe. During their tours, the TAC featured many notable musicians from both the US and Europe, including pianists Kristjan Randalu, John Escreet, Dan Tepfer, Jason Rebello, trumpeters Quentin Collins, Jay Phelps, Ambrose Akinmusire, Avishai Cohen, and drummers Colin Stranahan and Paul Wiltgen.

Janisch released his debut solo album Purpose Built in January 2010 featuring Walter Smith III, Patrick Cornelius, Jason Palmer, Johnathan Blake, Aaron Goldberg, Phil Robson, Mike Moreno, Jim Hart, and Paul Booth. His debut album also prompted him to create his own record label, Whirlwind Recordings. In January 2013 Janisch released Banned in London along with co-leader and Cuban-born pianist Aruán Ortiz, also featuring Greg Osby, Raynald Colom and Rudy Royston. In June 2014 Janisch released a collaborative album First Meeting: Live in London, Volume 1 with Lee Konitz, Dan Tepfer and Jeff Williams.

On October 2, 2015, Janisch released his second solo album, a double-disc titled Paradigm Shift featuring Leonardo Genovese (piano, keyboards), Paul Booth (tenor sax), Jason Palmer (trumpet), Alex Bonney (electronics) and Colin Stranahan (drums). The album features a live recording with post production electronics and led to the formation of a sextet band of the same name.

Janisch was nominated for a Parliamentary Jazz Award and MOBO Award for the Best Jazz Act in 2016.

Other musicians with whom Janisch have performed or recorded with include Joe Lovano, Dianne Reeves, Seamus Blake, George Garzone, Aaron Parks, Kurt Rosenwinkel, Will Vinson, Mark Turner, Kenny Wheeler, Quincy Jones, Evan Parker, Gary Husband, Shirley Horn, Gary Burton, Ingrid Jensen, Wynton Marsalis, Kurt Elling, Sir John Dankworth, Roy Hargrove and Clarence Penn.

In addition to performing, Janisch teaches jazz double/electric bass at the Royal Academy of Music in London.

== Whirlwind Recordings ==
Janisch founded the label in 2010 to release his debut solo album Purpose Built and has subsequently produced more than forty records for other musicians. The label releases albums from musicians mainly based in the UK, USA, and Mainland Europe. In October 2013, Janisch curated the first Whirlwind Festival at Kings Place in London featuring 18 bands and 86 musicians from the label across three days.

== Discography as a leader or co-leader ==
Year	Artist	Title	Genre	Label
2008	The TransAtlantic Collective (with Patrick Cornelius)	Traveling Song	Jazz	Woodville, reissued by Whirlwind
2010	Michael Janisch	Purpose Built	Jazz	Whirlwind
2012	Michael Janisch & Aruán Ortiz	Banned in London	Jazz	Whirlwind
2014	Lee Konitz, Dan Tepfer, Michael Janisch, Jeff Williams	First Meeting: Live in London, Volume 1	Jazz	Whirlwind
2015	Michael Janisch	Paradigm Shift	Jazz	Whirlwind
2019	Michael Janisch	Worlds Collide	Jazz	Whirlwind
