= Kneebody =

American jazz band

- Origin: New York City, New York; Los Angeles, California
- Genres: Jazz; jazz fusion; jazz-funk
- Years active: 2001–present
- Labels: Colortone; Greenleaf; Winter & Winter; Low Electrical
- Members: Adam Benjamin; Shane Endsley; Ben Wendel; Nate Wood
- Past members: Kaveh Rastegar
- Website: www.kneebody.com

Kneebody is an American jazz fusion band formed in 2001, consisting of Adam Benjamin on keyboards, Shane Endsley on trumpet, Ben Wendel on tenor saxophone, and Nate Wood on bass guitar and drums.

== History ==
Ben Wendel, Shane Endsley, Adam Benjamin, and Kaveh Rastegar met in the late 1990s as students at the Eastman School of Music. Benjamin later transferred to CalArts, where he met Nate Wood. After graduating Eastman, Wendel and Rastegar moved to Los Angeles, and the band got its start at the Temple Bar and The Vic in Santa Monica, California, where they played a weekly residency. The name of the band was a nonsense word invented by Wendel's girlfriend, so that the band had no clear leader and no clear musical connotations.

In 2005, the band's self-titled debut album was released on Dave Douglas' Greenleaf Music label. In 2007, they released their next album, Low Electrical Worker, to further critical acclaim (Joshua Redman declared it one of his favorite albums of 2007).

In February 2019, it was announced that Rastegar would be leaving the group to focus on other projects, with Wood taking on bass along with playing drums.

In May 2019 the band released the EP By Fire, consisting of covers and guest-vocalists via the label Edition Records.

== Style and influences ==
According to Nate Chinen, writing in The New York Times, Kneebody is "a resolutely un-pindownable band" acclaimed for their eclectic style, which "uses a common jazz instrumentation to make a somewhat less common amalgam of urban-signifying genres, from electro-pop to punk-rock to hip-hop."

== Members ==
=== Current ===
- Adam Benjamin – keyboards
- Shane Endsley – trumpet
- Ben Wendel – tenor saxophone
- Nate Wood – bass guitar, drums

=== Former ===
- Kaveh Rastegar – bass

== Discography ==
=== Studio albums ===
- Kneebody (Greenleaf, 2005)
- Low Electrical Worker (Colortone, 2007)
- Twelve Songs by Charles Ives with Theo Bleckmann (Winter & Winter, 2008)
- You Can Have Your Moment (Winter & Winter, 2010)
- The Line (Concord, 2013)
- Kneedelus with Daedelus (Brainfeeder, 2015)
- Anti-Hero (Motéma, 2017)
- Chapters (Edition, 2019)
- Reach (GroundUp, 2025)

=== Live albums ===
- Kneebody Live: Volume One (2007)
- Kneebody Live: Volume Two: Live in Italy (2009)
- Kneebody Live: Volume Three: Live in Paris (2011)
- Kneebody Live Fall Tour 2003 (2021)
- Live at Le Crescent (Edition, 2022)

=== EPs ===
- By Fire (2019)
