= Nate Wood =

American multi-instrumentalist (born 1979)

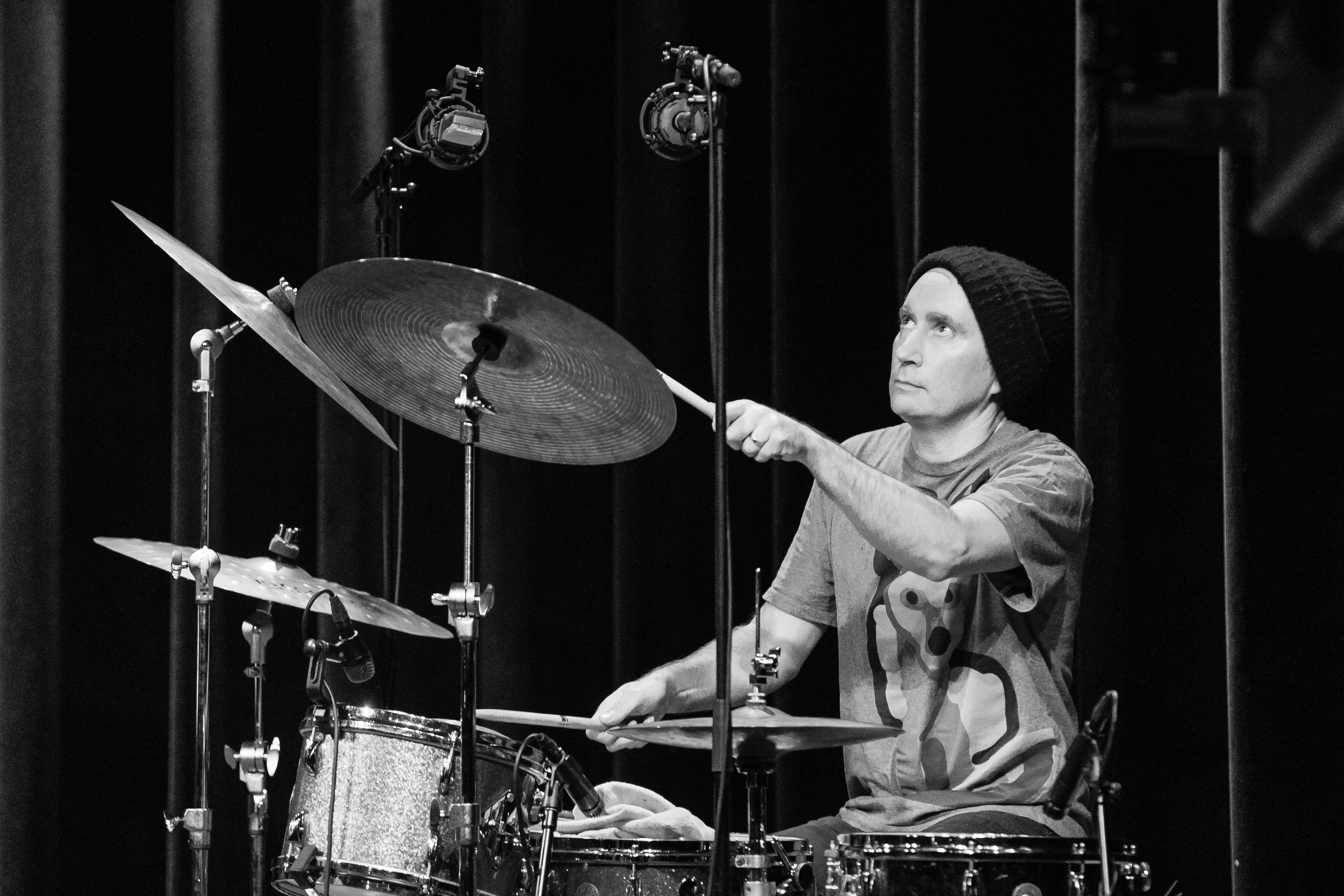

Background information
- Born: October 3, 1979 (age 46)
- Genres: Jazz; jazz fusion
- Occupations: Musician; songwriter; engineer
- Instruments: Drums; bass guitar; guitar; vocals
- Years active: 2000s–present
- Member of: Kneebody
- Website: natewoodmusic.net

Nate Wood (born October 3, 1979) is an American jazz multi-instrumentalist. He has performed with Wayne Krantz, Kneebody, Tigran Hamasyan, Louis Cole, The Calling, and Taylor Hawkins and the Coattail Riders.

== Background ==
Nate learned to play drums, bass, guitar, and saxophone, and attended the California Institute of the Arts for bass and drums, studying with Charlie Haden and Joe LaBarbera. He also attended Los Angeles College for Music for drums, where he studied under Ralph Humphrey and Joe Porcaro. After graduating, he played with Kneebody on their first gigs, and then toured with The Calling in support of their debut album. Afterwards, he recorded and played every instrument on his debut album, and in addition to his work with Kneebody, toured and performed with artists such as George Harrison, Chaka Khan, Sting, Wayne Krantz, Donny McCaslin, Taylor Hawkins and the Coattail Riders, the Ed Fry Band, and Snarky Puppy.

== Discography ==
=== As leader or co-leader ===
Solo albums

- Reliving (2003)
- Fall (2007)
- Another Time (2014)
- fOUR - X.it (2018)
- fOUR - Step Aside (2023)

With Kneebody

- Wendel (2002)
- Kneebody (2005)
- Low Electrical Worker (2007)
- Kneebody Live: Volume One (2007)
- Twelve Songs By Charles Ives (2009) – with Theo Bleckmann
- Kneebody Live: Volume Two: Live in Italy (2009)
- You Can Have Your Moment (2010)
- Kneebody Live: Volume Three: Live in Paris (2011)
- The Line (2013)
- Kneedelus (2015) – with Daedelus
- Anti-Hero (2017)
- By Fire (2019)
- Chapters (2019)
- Live at Le Crescent (2022)
- Reach (2025)

With ACT (Wood, Ben Wendel, and Harish Raghavan)

- ACT (2009)
- ACT II (2015)

=== As sideman ===
With Wayne Krantz

- Good Piranha / Bad Piranha (Abstract Logix, 2014)

With Tigran Hamasyan

- Red Hail (2009)
- Shadow Theater (Verve/Universal, 2012)
- The Bird of a Thousand Voices (2024)

With Taylor Hawkins and the Coattail Riders

- Taylor Hawkins and the Coattail Riders (Thrive, 2006)
- Red Light Fever (Shanabelle/RCA, 2010)

With The Calling

- Camino Palmero (RCA, 2001)
