= 2026 in jazz =

- Decade: 2020s in jazz
- Music: 2026 in music
- Standards: List of jazz standards
- See also: 2025 in jazz – 2027 in jazz

This is a timeline documenting the events of jazz in the year 2026.

== Events ==
- January 15 – Westdeutscher Rundfunk (WDR) announces Hanno Busch as the recipient of the WDR Jazzpreis 2026, and the Big Band der Humanwissenschaftlichen Fakultät der Universität zu Köln ('Big Band of the Faculty of Human Sciences at the University of Cologne) as the recipient of the 2026 Nachwuchspreis ('Young Talent Award').
- January 28 – The Melbourne International Jazz Festival announces the appointment of Xani Kolac as its 2026 Take Note programme leader.
- January 29 – Jazz at Lincoln Center announces that Wynton Marsalis is to stand down as its artistic director in July 2027.
- February 1 - The 68th Annual Grammy Awards occur, with the best recordings, compositions, and artists from August 31, 2024, to August 30, 2025 being eligible.
- February 27 – Jazz St. Louis announces that Victor Goines has stood down as its president and chief executive officer.
- April 23–25 – The Jazzahead festival takes place in Bremen, Germany.
- May 29–31 – The Java Jazz Festival takes place in its new venue, the Nusantara International Convention Exhibition, PIK 2.

== Albums ==
Month	Day	Artist	Album	Label	Subgenres	Notes	Ref.
January	9	Dave Stryker	Blue Fire: The Van Gelder Session	Strikezone Records			
January	16	Craig Taborn, with Tomeka Reid and Ches Smith	Dream Archives	ECM Records			
January	16	Richard Marx	After Hours	Richard Marx Inc.			
January	23	Julian Lage, with John Medeski, Jorge Roeder, and Kenny Wollesen	Scenes From Above	Blue Note Records	Chamber jazz		
January	30	Dave Douglas	Four Freedoms	Greenleaf Music			
January	30	Joel Ross	Gospel Music	Blue Note Records	Post-Bop; Spiritual jazz		
February	13	Melissa Aldana	Filin	Blue Note			
February	13	Julie Campiche	Unspoken	Ronin Rhythm Records			
March	3	John Pizzarelli	Dear Mr. Bennett	Green Hill Music			
March	3	Tomeka Reid	Dance! Skip! Hop!	Out Of Your Head Records			
March	6	Shabaka	Of the Earth	Shabaka Records			
March	6	Okkyung Lee	Signals	Flung Records			
June	5	Anna Lola	TIEMPO				
July	3	Ralph Alessi	A Sun That Never Sets	ECM			
July	31	Isaiah Collier	Joy	Brownswood			
September	25	Audrey Powne	Bodies of Water	BBE Music			

== Awards ==
=== Grammy Awards ===
The 68th Annual Grammy Awards were held on February 1, 2026, honoring the best recordings, compositions, and artists from August 31, 2024, to August 30, 2025, as chosen by the members of the Recording Academy.

Jazz
Best Jazz Performance: "Windows – Live" – Chick Corea, Christian McBride & Brian Blade; "Noble Rise" – Lakecia Benjamin featuring Immanuel Wilkins & Mark Whitfield; "Peace of Mind / Dreams Come True" – Samara Joy; "Four" – Michael Mayo; "All Stars Lead to You – Live" – Nicole Zuraitis, Dan Pugach, Tom Scott, Idan Morim, Keyon Harrold, Rachel Eckroth & Sam Weber	Best Jazz Vocal Album: Portrait – Samara Joy; Elemental – Dee Dee Bridgewater & Bill Charlap; We Insist 2025! – Terri Lyne Carrington & Christie Dashiell; Fly – Michael Mayo; Live at Vic's Las Vegas – Nicole Zuraitis, Dan Pugach, Tom Scott, Idan Morim, Keyon Harrold, Rachel Eckroth & Sam Weber
Best Jazz Instrumental Album: Southern Nights – Sullivan Fortner featuring Peter Washington & Marcus Gilmore; Trilogy 3 – Live – Chick Corea, Christian McBride & Brian Blade; Belonging – Branford Marsalis Quartet; Spirit Fall – John Patitucci featuring Chris Potter & Brian Blade; Fasten Up – Yellowjackets	Best Large Jazz Ensemble Album: Without Further Ado, Vol 1 – Christian McBride Big Band; Orchestrator Emulator – The 8-Bit Big Band; Lumen – Danilo Pérez & Bohuslän Big Band; Basie Rocks – Deborah Silver & The Count Basie Orchestra; Lights on a Satellite – Sun Ra Arkestra; Some Days Are Better: The Lost Scores – Kenny Wheeler Legacy featuring The Royal Academy of Music Jazz Orchestra & Frost Jazz Orchestra
Best Latin Jazz Album: A Tribute to Benny Moré and Nat King Cole – Gonzalo Rubalcaba, Yainer Horta & Joey Calveiro; La Fleur de Cayenne – Paquito D'Rivera & Madrid-New York Connection Band; The Original Influencers: Dizzy, Chano & Chico – Arturo O'Farrill & The Afro Latin Jazz Orchestra featuring Pedrito Martinez, Daymé Arocena, Jon Faddis, Donald Harrison & Melvis Santa; Mundoagua – Celebrating Carla Bley – Arturo O'Farrill & The Afro Latin Jazz Orchestra; Vanguardia Subterránea: Live at the Village Vanguard – Miguel Zenón Quartet	Best Alternative Jazz Album: Live-Action – Nate Smith; Honey from a Winter Stone – Ambrose Akinmusire; Keys to the City Volume One – Robert Glasper; Ride into the Sun – Brad Mehldau; Blues Blood – Immanuel Wilkins
Best Traditional Pop Vocal Album: A Matter of Time – Laufey; Wintersongs – Laila Biali; The Gift of Love – Jennifer Hudson; Who Believes in Angels? – Elton John & Brandi Carlile; Harlequin – Lady Gaga; The Secret of Life: Partners, Volume 2 – Barbra Streisand

== All critically reviewed albums ranked ==
=== Metacritic ===
Number	Artist	Album	Average score	Number of reviews	Reference
1	Shabaka	Of The Earth	85	6	
2	The Messthetics and James Brandon Lewis	Deface The Currency	83	4	
3	Pat Metheny	Side-Eye III+	83	5	
4	Bill Frisell	In My Dreams	78	6	
5	Julian Lage	Scenes From Above	76	5	

=== AnyDecentMusic? ===
Number	Artist	Album	Average score	Number of reviews	Reference
1	Shabaka	Of The Earth	7.9	6 reviews	

== Deaths ==
- January 26
  - Richie Beirach, American jazz pianist and composer, 78
  - Ian McDougall, Canadian jazz trombonist and academic, 87
- February 2 – Ken Peplowski, American jazz clarinetist and tenor saxophonist, 66
- February 7 – Kåre Grøttum, Norwegian jazz pianist and composer, 92
- February 9 – Michel Portal, French jazz clarinetist, saxophonist, and composer, 90
- March 12 – Keith Ingham, English jazz pianist, 88
- March 21 – Steve Houben, Belgian jazz saxophonist and flutist, 76
- May 19 – Gunter Hampel, German jazz multi-instrumentalist and composer, 88
- May 20 – Ron Escheté, American jazz guitarist, 77
- May 25 – Sonny Rollins, American jazz tenor saxophonist, 95

== See also ==
- List of 2026 albums
- List of jazz festivals
- List of years in jazz
- 2026 in music
