= Deciphering the Message =

Studio album by Makaya McCraven
- Released: November 19, 2021
- Genre: Jazz
- Length: 42:14
- Label: Blue Note
- Producer: Makaya McCraven

Makaya McCraven chronology
| Universal Beings E&F Sides (2020) | Deciphering the Message (2021) | In These Times (2022) |

Deciphering the Message is a studio album by American drummer, composer, and record producer Makaya McCraven. It was released on November 19, 2021, through Blue Note Records. It received generally favorable reviews from critics.

== Background ==
Makaya McCraven is an American drummer, composer, and record producer based in Chicago. Deciphering the Message is a 13-track album, containing his rework of classics from the Blue Note Records catalog. It features contributions from Joel Ross, De'Sean Jones, Jeff Parker, Matt Gold, Junius Paul, Marquis Hill, and Greg Ward. It was released on November 19, 2021, through Blue Note Records.

== Critical reception ==
Professional ratings
Aggregate scores
| Source | Rating |
|---|---|
| Metacritic | 78/100 |
Review scores
| Source | Rating |
| AllMusic | 4/5 stars |
| DownBeat | 3.5/5 stars |
| The Guardian | 4/5 stars |
| Loud and Quiet | 8/10 |
| Mojo | 4/5 stars |
| Pitchfork | 7.4/10 |
| PopMatters | 8/10 |
| Uncut | 6/10 |

According to the review aggregator Metacritic, Deciphering the Message received "generally favorable reviews" based on a weighted average score of 78 out of 100 from 7 critic scores.

John Fordham of The Guardian stated, "Jazzers who know every twitch of the originals won't abandon them now, and some, this writer included, will miss the fascinating long-form stories of resourceful improvisers on these barely two-minutes-plus tracks." He added, "But McCraven is balancing jazz's precious tradition and its present and future here, and that's a priceless contribution." Thom Jurek of AllMusic wrote, "His own hope for Deciphering the Message is to point new listeners toward the originals." He added, "As wonderful as that intention is, this album is a phenomenal listening experience in its own right."

Andrew Sacher of BrooklynVegan included the album in his list of the "12 Great Jazz Albums from 2021".

== Track listing ==
Deciphering the Message track listing
| No. | Title | Writer(s) | Length |
|---|---|---|---|
| 1. | "A Slice of the Top" | Hank Mobley | 3:11 |
| 2. | "Sunset" | Kenny Dorham | 3:48 |
| 3. | "When Your Lover Has Gone" | Einar Aaron Swan | 2:11 |
| 4. | "Ecaroh" | Horace Silver | 2:57 |
| 5. | "Tranquillity" | Robert Hutcherson | 3:39 |
| 6. | "Wail Bait" | Quincy Jones | 2:09 |
| 7. | "Coppin' the Haven" | Kenny Drew | 2:35 |
| 8. | "Frank's Tune" | Frank R Strozier | 3:37 |
| 9. | "Autumn in New York" | Vernon Duke | 5:55 |
| 10. | "Monaco" | Kenny Dorham | 2:24 |
| 11. | "Mr. Jin" | Wayne Shorter | 2:57 |
| 12. | "C.F.D." | Jack Wilson Jr. | 3:17 |
| 13. | "Black Rhythm Happening" | Eddie Gale Stevens | 3:34 |
| Total length: | | | 42:14 |

== Charts ==
Chart performance for Deciphering the Message
| Chart (2021) | Peak position |
|---|---|
| German Albums (Offizielle Top 100) | 97 |
| Swiss Albums (Schweizer Hitparade) | 98 |
| UK Jazz & Blues Albums (Official Charts) | 8 |
