= Dario Chiazzolino =

Italian guitarist

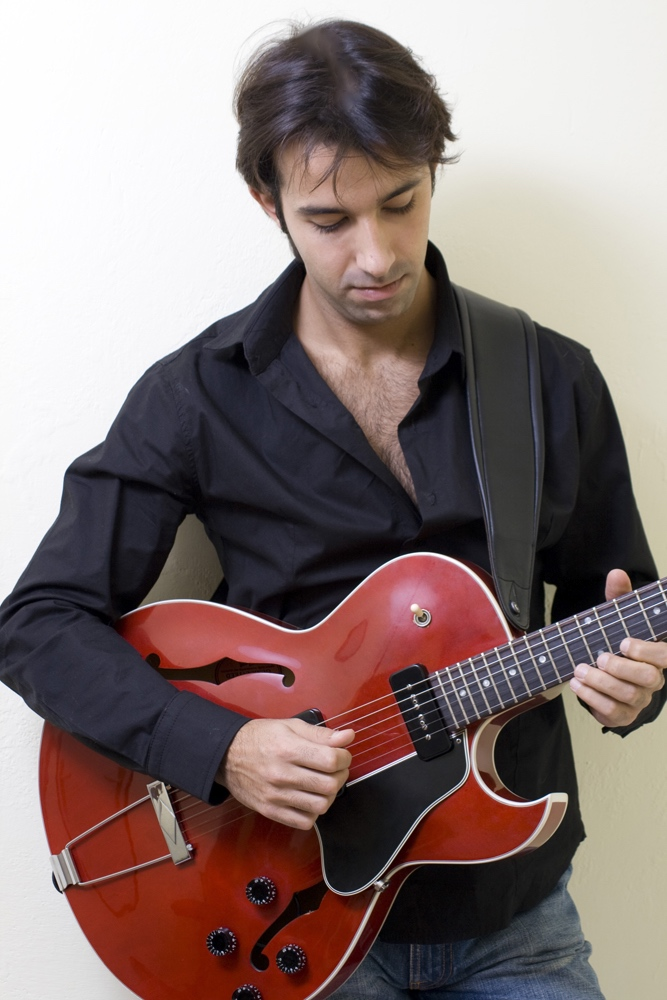

Background information
- Born: February 8, 1985 (age 41); Turin, Italy
- Genres: Jazz, world fusion
- Occupation: Musician
- Instrument: Guitar
- Years active: 1997–present
- Labels: Criss Cross
- Website: dariochiazzolino.com

Dario Chiazzolino (born February 8, 1985) is an Italian jazz guitarist based in New York City. He has played with Bob Mintzer, Billy Cobham, and the Yellowjackets.

== Career ==
In 2010, Chiazzolino collaborated with bassist Dany Noel, drummer Horacio "El Negro" Hernández, singer Concha Buika, and trumpeter Jerry González on a project blending Latin jazz and flamenco.

Chiazzolino recorded the album Paint Your Life with pianist Taylor Eigsti, bassist Marco Panascia, and drummer Willie Jones III, released by Tukool Records.

In 2012, Chiazzolino collaborated with Yellowjackets members Bob Mintzer, Russell Ferrante, and Jimmy Haslip, recording the album Lost in the Jungle.

Chiazzolino collaborated with Italian guitarist Nico Di Battista on the album Rewriting Songs, released in 2012, which reinterprets Italian traditional songs in a jazz style. In 2013, he worked with Cuban bassist Dany Noel Martinez to release Confidence, an album blending Italian and Cuban musical influences.

Chiazzolino recorded the album Red Cloud, released in 2016 by Tukool Records, featuring pianist Antonio Faraò, bassist Dominique Di Piazza, and drummer Manhu Roche.

In 2014, Chiazzolino toured with British saxophonist Andy Sheppard.

Chiazzolino has performed at notable jazz festivals, such as the Umbria Jazz Festival and NYC Winter Jazzfest, and at venues including Blue Note Milano and Ronnie Scott’s. In 2016, he released The Ninth Gig with the New Generation Trio. That year, he also collaborated with saxophonist Andy Sheppard. He later joined Spirit Fingers, a jazz-fusion band led by Greg Spero, with Hadrien Feraud and Mike Mitchell, contributing to their debut album Spirit Fingers released in 2018. In 2020, he worked with Spero on Piano & Guitar Improvisation and contributed to Spirit Fingers’ albums Goodbye and Peace.

== Discography ==
=== Albums as leader ===
- 2010: Bewitched – with Pit Linsky, Greg Miller.
- 2011: Paint your life – with Taylor Eigsti, Marco Panascia, Willie Jones III.
- 2011: The best thing for you – with Rick Stone.
- 2011: Very Early – with Dario Deidda, Gaetano Fasano.
- 2013: Rewriting Songs – with Nico Di Battista.
- 2013: Confidence – with Dany Noel Martinez.
- 2012: Lost in the jungle – with Bob Mintzer, Russel Ferrante, Jimmy Haslip.
- 2014: Red Cloud – with Antonio Faraò, Dominique Di Piazza, Manhu Roche.
- 2016: The Ninth Gig – New Generation Trio featuring Dario Chiazzolino
- 2022: I Am Ready – Dario Chiazzolino, Federico Malaman, Max Furian

=== Albums as sideman ===
- 2008: Six Strings – with Marc Didegrot, Emilie Elia, John Grael, Joe Kindman, Kirk Fairten, Joël Patrick
- 2008: Swing me – with CB Orchestra
- 2009: Six Strings – with Mathias Krüger, Vincent Körtig, Joël Patrick, Damien Werner, Joe Kindman, Joël Patrick
- 2009: Torino Jazz Lab – with Furio Di Castri, Bruno Tommaso, Torino Jazz Orchestra.
- 2010: Six Strings – with Antony Rives, Andrea Schmidt, Rian Fisher, Johan Mùller
- 2010: Proposcion – with Dany Noel Martinez, Horacio "El Negro" Hernandez, Ivan Bridon, Concha Buika
- 2009: Torino Jazz Lab – con Furio Di Castri, Javier Girotto, Torino Jazz Orchestra.
- 2010: Kabel – with Giovanni Falzone, Kabel Ensamble
- 2011: Virgen – with Ivan Bridon, Sofie Reinhardt
- 2011: Tinta Unida – with Dany Noel Martinez, Benjamin Santiago Molina, Juan Carlos González, Dani Morales, Diego Guerriero
- 2011: Nuovi Segnali Acustici – with Nico DI Battista, Roberto Taufic, Gino Evangelista, Giovanni Unterberger
- 2014: Untidiness – with Chiara Raggi, Aaron Goldberg, Ugonna Ogekwo, Lawrence Leathers.
- 2018: Polyrhythmic – with Greg Spero, Hadrien Feraud, Mike Mitchell.
- 2019: Blua Horizonto – Chiara Raggi
- 2020: Piano & Guitar Improvisation – Dario Chiazzolino & Greg Spero.
- 2020: Goodbye – Spirit Fingers feat. Judi Jackson – with Greg Spero, Dario Chiazzolino, Max Gerl, Mike Mitchell, Judi Jackson.
- 2020: Peace – Spirit Fingers with Greg Spero, Dario Chiazzolino, Max Gerl, Mike Mitchell.

== General references ==
- "Dario Chiazzolino – Credits – AllMusic". AllMusic.
- "Dario Chiazzolino – Award-Winning Artist". Dariochiazzolino.com.
- "Jazzitalia – Artisti: Dario Chiazzolino". Jazzitalia.net.
- "Master Music S.r.l. -Dario Chiazzolino". Master-music.it. Archived from the original on October 3, 2017.
- "Jazzitalia Eventi – Yellow Jackets al Blue Note / News – Dario Chiazzolino". Jazzitalia.net.
- "Dario Chiazzolino's Page". Thejazznetworkworldwide.com. Archived from the original on August 30, 2010.
- "chitarristi jazz italiani". Adgpa.it.
