= Off the Record (Makaya McCraven album) =

Compilation album by Makaya McCraven
- Released: October 17, 2025
- Genre: Jazz
- Length: 88:18
- Labels: International Anthem; Nonesuch; XL
- Producer: Makaya McCraven

Makaya McCraven chronology
In These Times (2022)	Off the Record (2025)

Off the Record is a compilation album by American drummer, composer, and record producer Makaya McCraven. It was released on October 17, 2025, through International Anthem Recording Company, Nonesuch Records, and XL Recordings. It received universal acclaim from critics.

== Background ==
Makaya McCraven is an American drummer, composer, and record producer. Off the Record is his first major project since In These Times (2022). It compiles four EPs: PopUp Shop, Hidden Out!, Techno Logic, and The People's Mixtape. It contains performances by McCraven, Jeff Parker, Benjamin J. Shepherd, Justefan, Junius Paul, Marquis Hill, Josh Johnson, Theon Cross, Ben LaMar Gay, Joel Ross, and Jeremiah Chiu.

The album was released on October 17, 2025, through International Anthem Recording Company, Nonesuch Records, and XL Recordings. The four EPs were later made available separately on October 31, 2025.

== Critical reception ==
Professional ratings
Aggregate scores
Source	Rating
Metacritic	83/100
Review scores
Source	Rating
AllMusic	4/5 stars
Clash	8/10
Jazzwise	3.5/5 stars
The Line of Best Fit	8/10
Pitchfork	7.8/10
Uncut	8/10

According to the review aggregator Metacritic, Off the Record received "universal acclaim" based on a weighted average score of 83 out of 100 from 7 critic scores.

Thom Jurek of AllMusic stated, "While each of these EPs stand on their own in quality, they create a rhythm orgy that is wildly musical and presented as a near symbiotic whole when combined." Tom Morgan of Clash called it "An essential listen for fans of jazz in all its adventurous modern forms and a broadly welcoming one for general listeners, despite its imposing exterior." Eddie Myer of Jazzwise wrote, "Fans of Can, J Dilla, DJ Shadow and similarly hip soundscapes will find much to enjoy here."

=== Accolades ===
Year-end lists for Off the Record
Publication	List	Rank	Ref.
AllMusic	Favorite Jazz Albums	—	
The Line of Best Fit	The Best Albums of 2025	33	

== Track listing ==
PopUp Shop track listing
No.	Title	Length
1.	"YoYoYo Intro"	0:30
2.	"Venice"	3:38
3.	"Imafan"	6:53
4.	"Los Gatos"	3:58
5.	"Sweet Stuff"	6:38

Hidden Out! track listing
No.	Title	Length
1.	"Battleships"	4:55
2.	"Away"	3:19
3.	"Dark Parks"	3:37
4.	"Awaze"	4:16
5.	"News Feed"	4:47
6.	"Braddas"	2:18

Techno Logic track listing
No.	Title	Length
1.	"Gnu Blue"	4:52
2.	"Technology"	3:48
3.	"Boom Bapped"	3:00
4.	"Prime"	4:30
5.	"Strikes Again"	6:07

The People's Mixtape track listing
No.	Title	Length
1.	"Choo Choo"	3:55
2.	"The Beat Up"	5:06
3.	"What a Life"	5:07
4.	"Lake Shore Drive Five"	7:02

== Charts ==
Chart performance for Off the Record
Chart (2025)	Peak position
UK Jazz & Blues Albums (Official Charts)	2
