= Universal Beings =

Studio album by Makaya McCraven
- Released: October 26, 2018
- Recorded: August 29, 2017; September 2, 2017; October 19, 2017; January 30, 2018
- Studios: H0l0 (Ridgewood, Queens, New York); Co-Prosperity Sphere (Bridgeport, Chicago, Illinois); Total Refreshment (Stoke Newington, London); Jeff Parker's house (Altadena, California)
- Genre: Jazz
- Length: 89:47
- Label: International Anthem
- Producer: Makaya McCraven

Makaya McCraven chronology
Where We Come From (Chicago x London Mixtape) (2018)	Universal Beings (2018)	Moving Cities (2019)

Universal Beings is a studio album by American drummer, composer, and record producer Makaya McCraven. It was released on October 26, 2018, through International Anthem Recording Company. It received universal acclaim from critics.

== Background ==
Makaya McCraven is an American drummer, composer, and record producer based in Chicago. Universal Beings is a double album, containing 22 tracks. It was recorded in New York, Chicago, London, and Los Angeles. It contains performances by McCraven, Brandee Younger, Joel Ross, Dezron Douglas, Tomeka Reid, Shabaka Hutchings, Junius Paul, Nubya Garcia, Ashley Henry, Daniel Casimir, Josh Johnson, Miguel Atwood-Ferguson, Jeff Parker, Anna Butterss, and Carlos Niño.

== Release ==
Universal Beings was released on October 26, 2018, through International Anthem Recording Company.

McCraven later released a companion album to Universal Beings, titled Universal Beings E&F Sides, in 2020. It contains 14 tracks recorded during the original album sessions. It was released digitally on July 31, 2020, and physically on September 25, 2020.

Mark Pallman directed a 26-minute documentary film, Universal Beings (2020), which features footage from McCraven's live performances, as well as interviews and studio scenes.

== Critical reception ==
Professional ratings
Aggregate scores
Source	Rating
Metacritic	86/100
Review scores
Source	Rating
AllMusic	5/5 stars
Exclaim!	8/10
Pitchfork	8.1/10

According to the review aggregator Metacritic, Universal Beings received "universal acclaim" based on a weighted average score of 86 out of 100 from 5 critic scores.

Thom Jurek of AllMusic commented that "Universal Beings is unique from any other jazz recording in 2018: It marries virtuoso musicianship, technological savvy, a keen editor's ear for creative inspiration, and a plethora of almighty grooves." Nate Chinen of Pitchfork wrote, "Informed by ambient and hip-hop protocols as well as state-of-the-art jazz hyperfluency, it suggests both the spark of discovery and the sheen of an obsessively sculptured art object." Scott A. Gray of Exclaim! stated, "While the music is clearly rooted in jazz, the influences on this ensemble's sound are vast and worldly, if not measurably universal."

At the 2019 JJA Jazz Awards, Universal Beings was nominated for the Record of the Year.

=== Accolades ===
Year-end lists for Universal Beings
Publication	List	Rank	Ref.
AllMusic	AllMusic Best of 2018	—	
Noisey	The 100 Best Albums of 2018	62	
NPR	The 50 Best Albums of 2018	30	
Spin	The 51 Best Albums of 2018	38	

== Track listing ==
New York Side
No.	Title	Length
1.	"A Queen's Intro"	0:32
2.	"Holy Lands"	5:14
3.	"Young Genius"	5:32
4.	"Black Lion"	2:56
5.	"Tall Tales"	4:16
6.	"Mantra"	3:48

Chicago Side
No.	Title	Length
7.	"Pharaoh's Intro"	1:58
8.	"Atlantic Black"	9:10
9.	"Inner Flight"	3:02
10.	"Wise Man, Wiser Woman"	3:13
11.	"Prosperity's Fear"	6:11

London Side
No.	Title	Length
12.	"Flipped Out"	2:40
13.	"Voila"	5:00
14.	"Suite Haus"	5:09
15.	"The Newbies Lift Off"	6:19
16.	"The Royal Outro"	1:44

Los Angeles Side
No.	Title	Length
17.	"The Count Off"	1:09
18.	"Butterss's"	2:59
19.	"Turtle Tricks"	4:15
20.	"The Fifth Monk"	8:01
21.	"Brighter Days Beginning"	2:32
22.	"Universal Beings"	4:08

== Personnel ==
Credits adapted from liner notes.

- Makaya McCraven – drums, production
- Brandee Younger – harp (1–6)
- Joel Ross – vibraphone (1–6)
- Dezron Douglas – double bass (1–6)
- Tomeka Reid – cello (1–11)
- Shabaka Hutchings – tenor saxophone (7–11)
- Junius Paul – double bass (7–11), percussion (7–11)
- Nubya Garcia – tenor saxophone (12–16)
- Ashley Henry – Rhodes piano (12–16)
- Daniel Casimir – double bass (12–16)
- Josh Johnson – alto saxophone (17–22)
- Miguel Atwood-Ferguson – violin (17–22)
- Jeff Parker – guitar (17–22)
- Anna Butterss – double bass (17–22)
- Carlos Niño – percussion (17–22)
- David Allen – recording, mixing
- Dave Vettraino – recording, mixing
- Scott McNiece – executive production
- Damon Locks – cover art
- Aaron Lowell Denton – design
- Craig Hansen – insert design
- Fabrice Bourgelle – insert cover photography

== Charts ==
Chart performance for Universal Beings
Chart (2018)	Peak position
US Jazz Albums (Billboard)	3
