= Booker T. Washington High School for the Performing and Visual Arts =

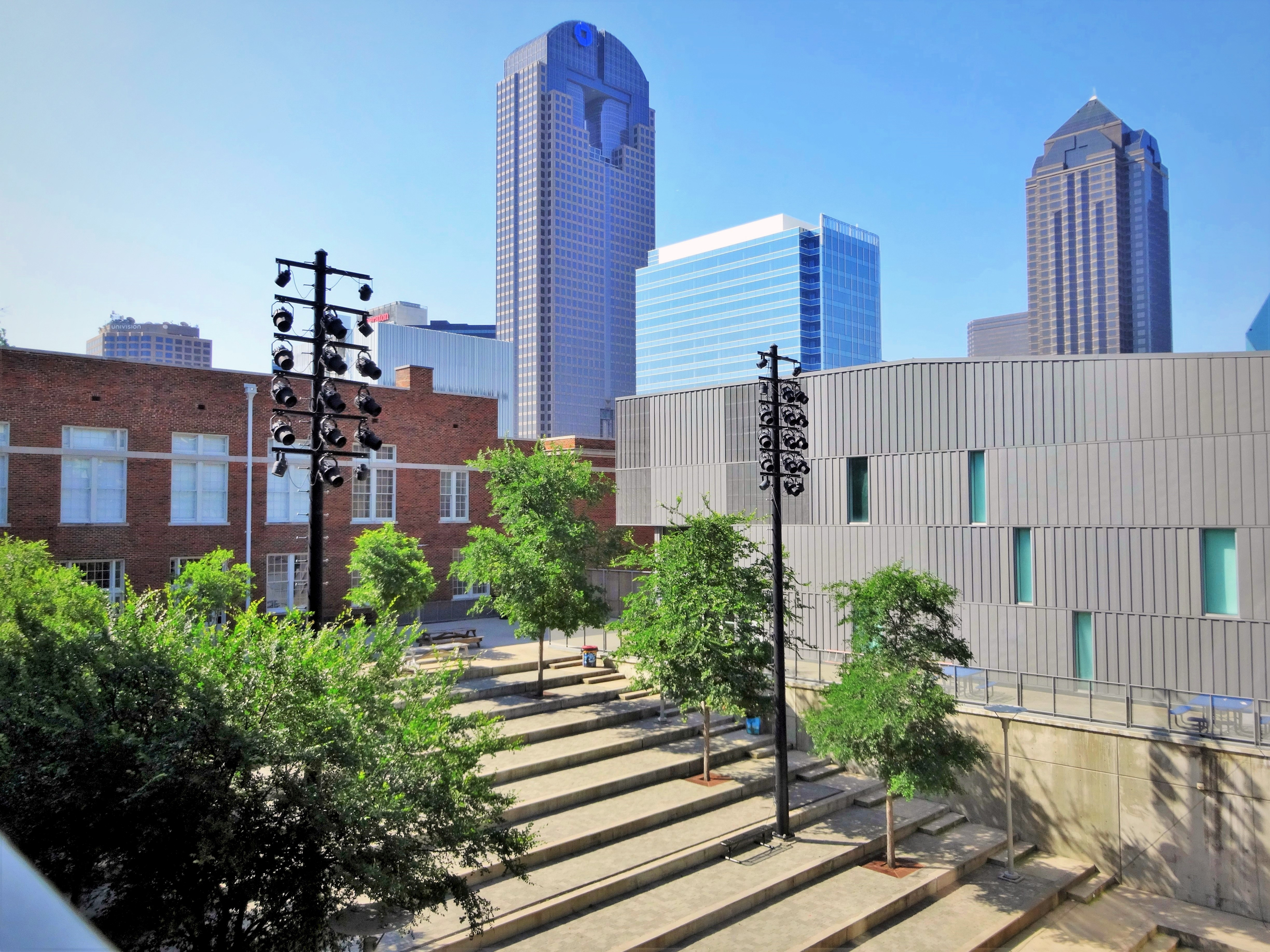
- Booker T. Washington HSPVA courtyard

Location
- 2501 Flora Street; Dallas, Texas 75201; United States; 32.791185°N 96.796564°W

Information
- Type: Secondary
- Motto: To provide intensive training in the arts and academics.
- School district: Dallas Independent School District
- Principal: Gary Williams
- Staff: 54.89 (FTE)
- Faculty: 79
- Grades: 9-12
- Enrollment: 1,002 (2017-18)
- Student to teacher ratio: 18.25
- Colors: Blue and Black
- Mascot: Pegasus
- Trustee dist.: 9
- Learning Community: Magnet Schools Learning Community, Tiffany Huitt
- Website: http://www.dallasisd.org/bookert

Dallas Landmark
- Designated: 24 April 2006

Booker T. Washington High School for the Performing and Visual Arts (BTWHSPVA), also known locally as Booker T, is a public secondary school located in the Arts District of downtown Dallas, Texas, United States. Booker T. Washington HSPVA enrolls students in grades 9-12 and is the Dallas Independent School District's arts magnet school (thus, it is often locally referred to simply as Arts Magnet). Many accomplished performers and artists have been educated in the school, including Norah Jones, Erykah Badu, Adario Strange, Valarie Rae Miller, Edie Brickell, Kennedy Davenport, Sandra St. Victor, Roy Hargrove, and Scott Westerfeld. Baseball Hall of Famer Ernie Banks is among the most notable graduates of the school previous to its conversion to the Arts Magnet.

== History ==
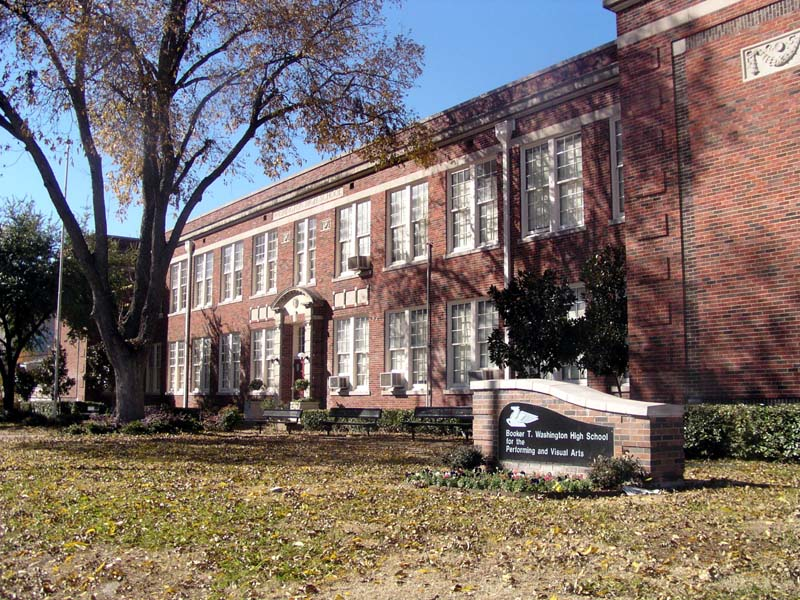
Booker T. Washington High School for the Performing and Visual Arts

In 1892, Dallas established its first high school for African-American pupils. In 1911, the school was enlarged and named the Dallas Colored High School. The school was moved in 1922 to larger quarters, designed by famed Dallas architects Lang and Witchell, and renamed Booker T. Washington High School, after the African-American education pioneer Booker T. Washington. For many years, it was the only Dallas high school that allowed students of color.

In 1939, Wilmer-Hutchins Colored High School of the Wilmer-Hutchins ISD burned down in a fire. Afterwards, African-American WHISD students were sent to DISD high schools for "colored" people such as Washington.

In 1942, teacher Thelma Paige Richardson sued the Dallas School District, demanding equalization of pay based upon tenure and merit; the school district denied that any discrimination was taking place. Richardson, with the help of the NAACP, won the case, increasing general awareness of discrimination in the public school system.

In 1952, it was enlarged yet again, and given the new name as Booker T. Washington Technical High School.

In 1976, the school was repurposed as the Arts Magnet at Booker T. Washington High School, inheriting and expanding the magnet-school curricula that had been in place in the Performing Arts and Visual Arts clusters of Skyline High School's Career Development Center since 1970. The Arts Magnet became a prototype for magnet schools across the country. The repurposing was part of the federal court desegregation orders that created the magnet school system in Dallas ISD (Tasby v. Estes). Paul Baker was selected by Superintendent Nolan Estes as founding director of the school.

The neighborhood surrounding Washington has evolved into the Dallas Arts District. The main school building was designated an official Dallas Landmark in 2006.

In 2008, the building was enlarged a third time when a new $65-million facility designed by Brad Cloepfil of Allied Works Architecture, was completed. The expansion preserved the historic main building.

== Statistics ==
The attendance rate for students at the school is 96%, equal with the state average; 32% of the students at Washington are economically disadvantaged, 2% enroll in special education, 31% enroll in gifted and talent programs, and 1% are considered "limited English proficient." The class of 2017 managed to receive over $60 million in offered scholarships and grants.

The ethnic makeup of the school is 39% White American, 23% African American, 32% Hispanic American, 3% Asian American/Pacific Islander American, 3% multiracial, and 1% American Indian/Alaskan Native.

The average class sizes at Washington are 20 students for English, 27 for foreign language, 19 for math, 22 for science, and 25 for social studies.

== Notable faculty ==
- J. Mason Brewer
- Julia Caldwell Frazier

== Notable alumni ==
Notable alumni include:

- Erykah Badu – musician
- Zac Baird – keyboardist for nu metal band Korn
- Ernie Banks – Hall of Fame baseball player
- Bill Blair – Negro leagues baseball player, newspaper publisher
- Edie Brickell – musician
- Miguel Cervantes – actor, Hamilton in Chicago and on Broadway
- Reed Easterwood – rock guitarist
- Laganja Estranja – RuPaul's Drag Race season six, top eight
- Kennedy Davenport – RuPaul's Drag Race season seven, top four
- Todd Duffey – actor, Office Space (1999), Waiter with "flair"
- Arlo Eisenberg – X Games in-line skate athlete and visual artist
- Shahine Ezell – actor, producer, DJ
- Max Gerl - jazz musician
- Froy Gutierrez – actor, singer, model
- Roy Hargrove – jazz musician
- Darius Holbert – film/television composer, record producer
- Jazzmeia Horn - jazz singer, composer
- Willie Hutch – singer, songwriter
- Norah Jones – musician
- Liv.e – musician
- Shaun Martin – jazz musician
- Bunny Michael – visual artist, musician, and rapper
- Elizabeth Mitchell – actress, known for her role as Dr. Juliet Burke on Lost
- Mike Mitchell - musician
- Sara Mokuria – activist and teacher
- Ephraim Owens – trumpeter
- Shawn Pittman – blues rock singer, multi-instrumentalist, songwriter, and record producer
- Marc Rebillet – electronic musician and YouTube performer
- Julia Scott Reed – journalist
- Don Sidle – NBA draft pick from the University of Oklahoma
- Erica Tazel – actress (Justified, Roots, Mafia III)
- Ptosha Storey- Actress

== See also ==
- History of the African Americans in Dallas-Fort Worth
- List of things named after Booker T. Washington
