= Hadrien Feraud =

French jazz bassist

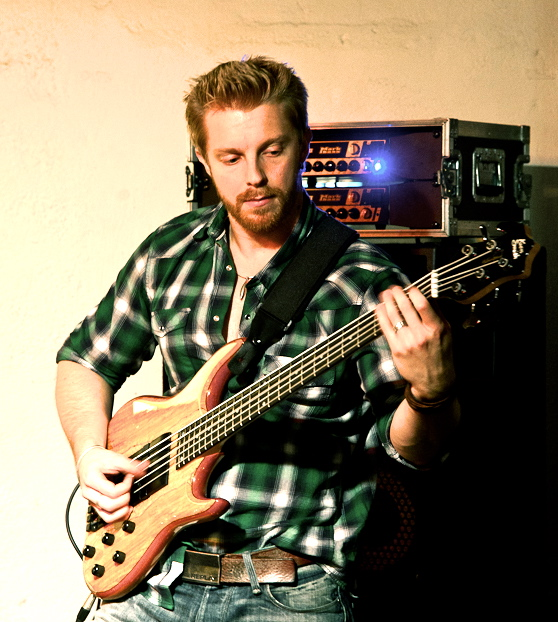
- Hadrien Feraud, Jazz-Club Minden/Germany 2012

Background information
- Born: Hadrien Feraud; August 16, 1984 (age 41); Paris, France

Hadrien Feraud (born August 16, 1984) is a French jazz bassist.

== Early life ==
Feraud was born August 16, 1984, in Paris. His parents were both musicians, and from a young age Feraud was immersed in rock and roll, blues, funk, R&B, new wave, and jazz. He also had a deep interest in film scores. Feraud began studying guitar at age 8, taking lessons from his father. At first, he was more interested in playing the drums, but this changed when he received a copy of The Birthday Concert by Jaco Pastorius at age 12, which sparked his interest in the electric bass, particularly Pastorius's techniques. Feraud immersed himself in studies of electric bass, analyzing the techniques of Pastorius, James Jamerson, Bernard Edwards, Nathan East, Christian McBride, Victor Bailey, Anthony Jackson, Skúli Sverrisson, Gary Willis, Matthew Garrison, Richard Bona, Linley Marthe and Jeff Berlin.

== Work ==
Toward the end of 2004, Feraud started composing works for his first solo project, while also playing at several clubs and jams in Paris. The album, Hadrien Feraud, was released in 2007 and featured guest musicians such as John McLaughlin, Biréli Lagrène, Flavio Boltro, Jean-Marie Ecay, Jean-Pierre Como, Marc Berthoumieux, Mokhtar Samba, Jim Grancamp, Jon Grancamp, Dominique Di Piazza, Thierry Eliez, and Linley Marthe.

In 2005, John McLaughlin invited Feraud to contribute on two tracks ("For Jaco" and "Senor C.S.") on his album Industrial Zen.

In 2007, he played on Chick Corea's album The Vigil. In 2009, he toured Europe as a member of John McLaughlin and the 4th dimension (with Gary Husband on keyboards and Mark Mondesir on drums).

Feraud arranged and produced Biréli Lagrène's album Electric Side.

== Basses and amps ==
In September 2009, Feraud and Ken Smith announced the creation of the "Hadrien Feraud Signature Burner", to be made in Japan by Hajime Hirose and SleekElite, under the direction of Smith. Hand built models were scheduled to be released before the end of 2009, with mass-produced simplified models (no exotic tops or woods) to be released in early 2010. Early photographs showed the bass with a buckeye burl top, maple neck, ebony fretboard and removable ebony ramp, and it features the Ken Smith 18v preamp, with a Mid Switch for different tones and volume boost.

Feraud has used Markbass amps.

== Awards ==
- Down Beat Critics Poll "Rising Star Electric Bassist of the year" 2008
- Down Beat Critics Poll 2nd position in "Rising Star Electric Bass" 2009
- Bass Player Magazine "Readers Choice Award" Most Exciting new Player 2009

== Discography ==
- Industrial Zen - John McLaughlin (2006)
- Hadrien Feraud - Hadrien Feraud (2007)
- Brooklyn, Paris to Clearwater - Chick Corea (2007)
- Official Pirate - John McLaughlin and the 4th Dimension (2007)
- Floating Point - John McLaughlin (2008)
- Bireli Electric Side - Biréli Lagrène (2008)
- Christophe et Tony Raymond - Christophe et Tony Raymond (2009)
- The Golden Age of Apocalypse - Thundercat (2011)
- The Vigil - Chick Corea (2013)
- Born in the 80's - Hadrien Feraud (2015)
- Spirit Fingers - Greg Spero, Mike Mitchell, Dario Chiazzolino (2018)
- Sonicwonderland - Hiromi Uehara (2023)
- A Soul in Time - Morgan-Husband-Feraud (2024)
- OUT THERE - Hiromi Uehara (2025)
