= Easterwood =

Easterwood may refer to:

- Easterwood (surname), a surname
- Easterwood Airport, an airport in Brazos County, Texas, United States
- 11691 Easterwood, a main-belt asteroid
