= Daniel Casimir =

English musician

Daniel Casimir is a London-based composer and bassist. Accolades he has won include 2021 Instrumentalist of the Year in the Jazz FM Awards, and in 2022 his album Boxed In was "Album of the Year" at the Parliamentary Jazz Awards.

== Early life and education ==
Casimir was raised in Greenford, a West London suburb. After first playing steel pan when he was 12 years old, he switched to bass guitar from the age of 15 and then to upright bass when studying jazz at Birmingham Conservatoire. After graduating in 2012, Casimir completed a master's degree at Trinity Laban Conservatoire in 2015. He is an alumnus of music education and artist development organisation Tomorrow's Warriors, which he says "played a key part" in his career.

== Career ==
Daniel Casimir has recorded and toured extensively in the band of saxophonist Nubya Garcia. He has performed also in the bands of Binker Golding, Moses Boyd, Camilla George, Ashley Henry, Makaya McCraven and Lonnie Liston Smith, among others. Casimir is also a composer, and his Balance album is performed by the Dan Casimir Big Band, leading figures of the new UK jazz scene, together with orchestral elements from the string section of the London Contemporary Orchestra.

== Discography ==
=== Albums ===
- These Days (2019, with Tess Hirst, Jazz re:freshed)
- Boxed In (2021, Jazz Refreshed|Jazz re:freshed)
- Balance (2024, Jazz Refreshed|Jazz re:freshed)

=== Singles and EPs ===
- "Escapee" (2017, Jazz re:freshed)

== Awards and nominations ==
Year	Award	Category	Nominee(s)	Result	Ref.
2016	The Musicians' Company	Young Jazz Musician Award	Daniel Casimir	Won	
2021	Jazz FM Awards	Instrumentalist of the Year	Daniel Casimir	Won	
2022	Parliamentary Jazz Awards	Jazz Album of the Year	Daniel Casimir Boxed In	Won	
2024	The Arts Foundation Futures Awards	Jazz Composition, Fellowship	Daniel Casimir	Won	
