= Cold Duck Complex =

American hip-hop and jazz band

- Origin: Amherst, Massachusetts, United States
- Genres: Hip hop, jazz
- Years active: 2000–2009
- Labels: Dozo Music M.I.T.E!
- Past members: Casey Hayman (Platypus Complex); Makaya McCraven; Joe Cardozo; Darby Wolf; Jeff D'Antona; Jesse Goldman

Cold Duck Complex was an American hip-hop and jazz band based in Western Massachusetts. Formed by students at Amherst Regional High School in 2000, the group began as Cold Duck Trio, named after the Les McCann song "Cold Duck Time," and were known for their energetic live performances. The initial lineup consisted of drummer Makaya McCraven, bassist Joe Cardozo, and keyboardist Jesse Goldman. Rapper Casey Hayman joined the group in 2001, using the name Platypus Complex, and Jeff D'Antona joined on keyboard in 2002.

The band often played venues in Northampton, Massachusetts and at the University of Massachusetts, which several band members attended as students. In 2003, after winning UMass' Battle of the Bands, they performed as an opening act for Rahzel and 50 Cent, and have also performed with Digable Planets, Mix Master Mike, and Pharcyde.

== Music and albums ==
Cold Duck Complex's music spanned a variety of genres, including hip-hop, jazz, funk, and rock; The New York Times, in an article about McCraven, described CDC as "a jam band-cum-hip-hop group that became popular on college campuses." McCraven cited The Roots and Rage Against the Machine as influences on the band, as well as his own background in jazz. Platypus Complex's lyrics were similarly varied, ranging from pointed social commentary to braggadocio, and from philosophical reflections to "story-time rap in the tradition of Slick Rick," in the words of one reviewer. One of Cold Duck Complex's best-known songs, "Wake Up," discussed the September 11 attacks and implored Americans to see the attacks as a consequence of U.S. foreign policy.

Their second album, Figureheads, reached #11 on CMJ's North American hip-hop charts. The album was described by one reviewer as "fit[ting] together heavy content, high intellect, [and] low humor," though critiqued the production quality of its opening track.

This was followed by Enough in 2006, characterized by a "resigned and reflective mood" and highbrow cultural references, in the words of Greg Saulmon. Cold Duck Complex released their final album, "Cold Duck Complex Presents Freshwater: Bad Love", in 2009, with Darby Wolf on keyboard.

== Discography ==
- Cold Duck Trio & Platypus Complex (2002)
- Figureheads (2003)
- Enough (2006)
- Cold Duck Complex Presents Freshwater: Bad Love (2009)
