= Pawn Shop from Heaven =

Studio album by Junky Southern
- Released: January 1996
- Genre: Rock, Indie
- Label: Parallax Records
- Producer: Reed Easterwood

Professional ratings
Review scores
Source	Rating
Dallas Observer	(?)
Dallas Observer	(?)

Pawn Shop from Heaven is a full-length album by Junky Southern released in 1996.

== Track listing ==
1. "All Things Manifest"
2. "True Love"
3. "Pawn Shop From Heaven"
4. "Untitled"
5. "Whisper Religion"
6. "Hurts So Bad"
7. "Paradise Lost"
8. "Girl of Our Pictures"
9. "Cry Like a Baby"
10. "Portable Idiot Man"
11. "Mr. Angry Song"
12. "Siegessaule "
