= Easterwood (surname) =

Easterwood is a surname. Notable people with the surname include:

- Hal Easterwood (1932–2005), American football player
- Reed Easterwood (born 1967), American guitarist, producer, and songwriter
- Roy Easterwood (1915–1984), American baseball player
