= Julia Scott Reed =

American journalist

Julia Scott Reed (July 17, 1917 – October 19, 2004) was a journalist, editor and radio broadcaster. She became the first African American columnist at the Dallas Morning News in 1967.

== Early life ==
Reed was born July 17, 1917, in Dallas, Texas. Her father, Johnnie McGee died when she was young. Julia grew up in an affluent white neighborhood where her mother worked as a maid. The family moved into one of the African American communities in Dallas where Julia attended Booker T. Washington High School. After she graduated in 1935 she attended Wiley College for two years, and went on to graduate from Phillip's Business School, where she accumulated her journalism skills.

== Career ==
Reed started her career as the Texas correspondent for the Kansas City Call. In 1951, she joined the black newspaper Dallas Express, where she used her own camera to take pictures for her articles. Among the historical topics covered, after experiencing it for herself, were the early years of desegregation in schools and in public transportation. She became the editor of the Dallas Express. Thereafter, she serviced KNOK Radio for eight years, covering the segment "News and Views." In 1967, she was the first black woman to report for The Dallas Morning News.

Reed's column in the Dallas Morning News, "The Open Line," contained important content that would have gone unnoticed in mass media. She emphasized achievements of the black community, and exposed injustices toward blacks, such as busing and segregation.: Among the diversity of topics brought to light by Mrs. Reed were medical breakthroughs by black doctors, the need of donated blood in Dallas, disease of alcoholism everywhere, the abundance of black infants and children in need of foster and adoptive homes, ebony fashion, encouragement to the black youth to enter nursing fields, and like stories in many industries. Her column brought on a flood of appreciation letters, by both her readers and her subjects.

Julia Scott Reed acquired many appreciation awards for valued services and prestigious awards through her intensive community service and commitment to her career. She received numerous of congratulatory letters from a range of people from the national and Texas House of Representatives to personnel of hotels she visited. To name a few: Woman of the Year honored by Iota Phi Lambda Psi Chapter 1970–71, Joseph B. Lockridge Award of Excellence, Extra Mile Award, Maura Award, honored by The Media Task Force of Women for Change, Inc., and commissioned assistant to the governor on April 28, 1973. Dallas Mayor Robert Folsom, proclaimed March 18, 1979 as "Julia Scott Reed Day" in the city. She retired in 1979.
