= Julia Caldwell Frazier =

American educator

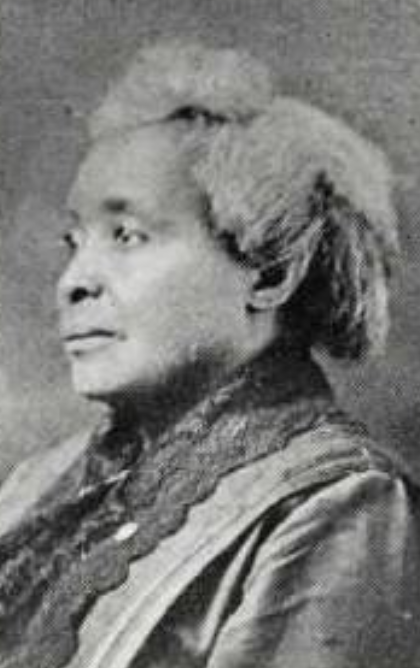
- Julia Caldwell Frazier, from the 1925 Howard University yearbook
- Born: October 10, 1863; Somerville, Alabama
- Died: March 26, 1929; Texas
- Occupation: Educator

Julia Caldwell Frazier (October 10, 1863 – March 26, 1929) was an American educator. One of the first women to graduate from Howard University, she taught at the Dallas Colored High School (later relocated and renamed as Booker T. Washington High School) from 1892 to 1924, and was the school's interim principal for the 1919–1920 school year.

== Early life and education ==
Julia L. Caldwell was born in Somerville, Alabama, the daughter of Joseph Caldwell and Matilda Caldwell, both of whom were born and raised in South Carolina. She was raised in Columbus, Georgia. According to the 1880 census, her family moved to Columbus, Georgia somewhere between 1870 and 1880. She was living at home with her three sisters and parents. At the time of her graduation from Howard University, she was the only woman in a class of six people. She graduated from Howard University in 1888, the third woman to earn a bachelor's degree at Howard, after Matilda Adams Nichols and Josephine Turpin. She pursued further studies throughout her life, at Tuskegee Institute, Clark University and Columbia University. She was awarded an honorary master's degree at Howard in 1925.

== Career ==
Caldwell taught at Morris Brown College in Atlanta after college. She moved to Dallas, Texas in 1892. She taught Latin, English, and German at Dallas Colored High School (later relocated and renamed as Booker T. Washington High School). She served as interim principal for the 1919–1920 school year. From 1922 to 1924, she was head of the school's Foreign Language department.

Outside of teaching, Caldwell was president and co-founder of the Ladies' Reading Circle, one of the city's first Black women's clubs, in 1892. She wrote for the A.M.E. Church Review and other publications. She was treasurer of the Colored Teachers State Association, and president of the Dallas chapter of the Howard Alumni Association. "She has probably sent more students to Howard than any other person," remarked the Howard yearbook in 1925.

== Personal life and legacy ==
Caldwell married fellow teacher Charles Wales Wellington (W. W.) Frazier in 1908. She helped to raise her husband's three children, was close to her niece, teacher Dollie Alice Caldwell, and escorted Miss Caldwell down the aisle at her wedding in 1920; she also hosted the wedding reception in her home. Julia Caldwell Frazier was widowed in February 1912, and died on March 26, 1929.

Dallas's Julia C. Frazier Elementary School was named for her in 1930. Frazier Hall, a women's dormitory at Howard University, was also named in her memory. In 1942 a public housing project in Dallas was named Frazier Courts after her.

In 1961, Sue Bailey Thurman shared her collection of dolls with Ebony magazine, including one made by Meta Vaux Warrick Fuller in Frazier's likeness. In 2018, Julia C. Frazier Elementary School was renamed Frazier House, and became a social service center.
