= Nublues =

Studio album by Joel Ross
- Released: February 9, 2024
- Studio: The Bunker Studio, Brooklyn, New York
- Genre: Jazz
- Length: 68:13
- Label: Blue Note
- Producer: Walter Smith III, Joel Ross

Joel Ross chronology
| The Parable of the Poet (2022) | Nublues (2024) | Gospel Music (2026) |

Nublues (stylized in all lowercase) is a 2024 album by American jazz vibraphonist Joel Ross, released on Blue Note Records. It is a collection of blues and ballad tracks, including original compositions, and three jazz standards written by Thelonious Monk and John Coltrane.

== Background ==
During the COVID-19 pandemic, Joel Ross re-enrolled in the New School to complete his degree, during which he took a class from Darius Jones about blues music. This inspired Ross to reconsider the blues as "a sort of spirit, an energy", rather than a specific form. Ross also wished to make music that was more accessible than his previous work.

== Critical reception ==
Professional ratings
Aggregate scores
| Source | Rating |
|---|---|
| Metacritic | 84/100 |
Review scores
| Source | Rating |
| AllMusic | 4/5 stars |
| Financial Times | 4/5 stars |
| The Observer | 4/5 stars |
| The Times | 4/5 stars |

The album was met with critical acclaim. Mike Hobart, writing for the Financial Times, gave the album four stars, stating that "Intense modal jazz and field-holler wails sit side by side, but only as signifiers in an intense and wide-ranging set...it is the intuitive interplay of a long-established band that most impresses." Will Layman of PopMatters highlighted the album on the site's JazzMatters column, declaring that it "continues a strong run [for Ross] on Blue Note", and praised pianist Jeremy Corren's playing on the track "ya know". Phil Freeman, writing in Stereogum's monthly Ugly Beauty column, said the album "arises out of an urge to explore ballads and blues, and in so doing find his way to the heart of jazz, to move it forward by examining its past and its roots".

== Track listing ==
All tracks written by Joel Ross unless otherwise indicated.

1. "Early" – 3:56
2. "Equinox" (John Coltrane) – 8:37
3. "Mellowdee" – 11:12
4. "Chant" (Gabrielle Garo, Ross) – 2:38
5. "What Am I Waiting For?" – 2:46
6. "Bach (God the Father in Eternity)" – 8:40
7. "Nublues" (Ross, Immanuel Wilkins, Jeremy Corren, Jeremy Dutton, Kanoa Mendenhall) – 8:12
8. "Ya Know?" – 9:37
9. "Evidence" (Thelonious Monk)– 8:02
10. "Central Park West" (Coltrane) – 4:28

Track titles are stylized in all lowercase.

== Personnel ==
- Joel Ross – vibraphone
- Immanuel Wilkins – alto saxophone
- Kanoa Mendenhall – bass
- Jeremy Dutton – drums
- Gabrielle Garo – flute (4–6)
- Jeremy Corren – piano

== Charts ==
Chart performance for Nublues
| Chart (2024) | Peak position |
|---|---|
| Croatian International Albums (HDU) | 27 |
