= Immanuel Wilkins =

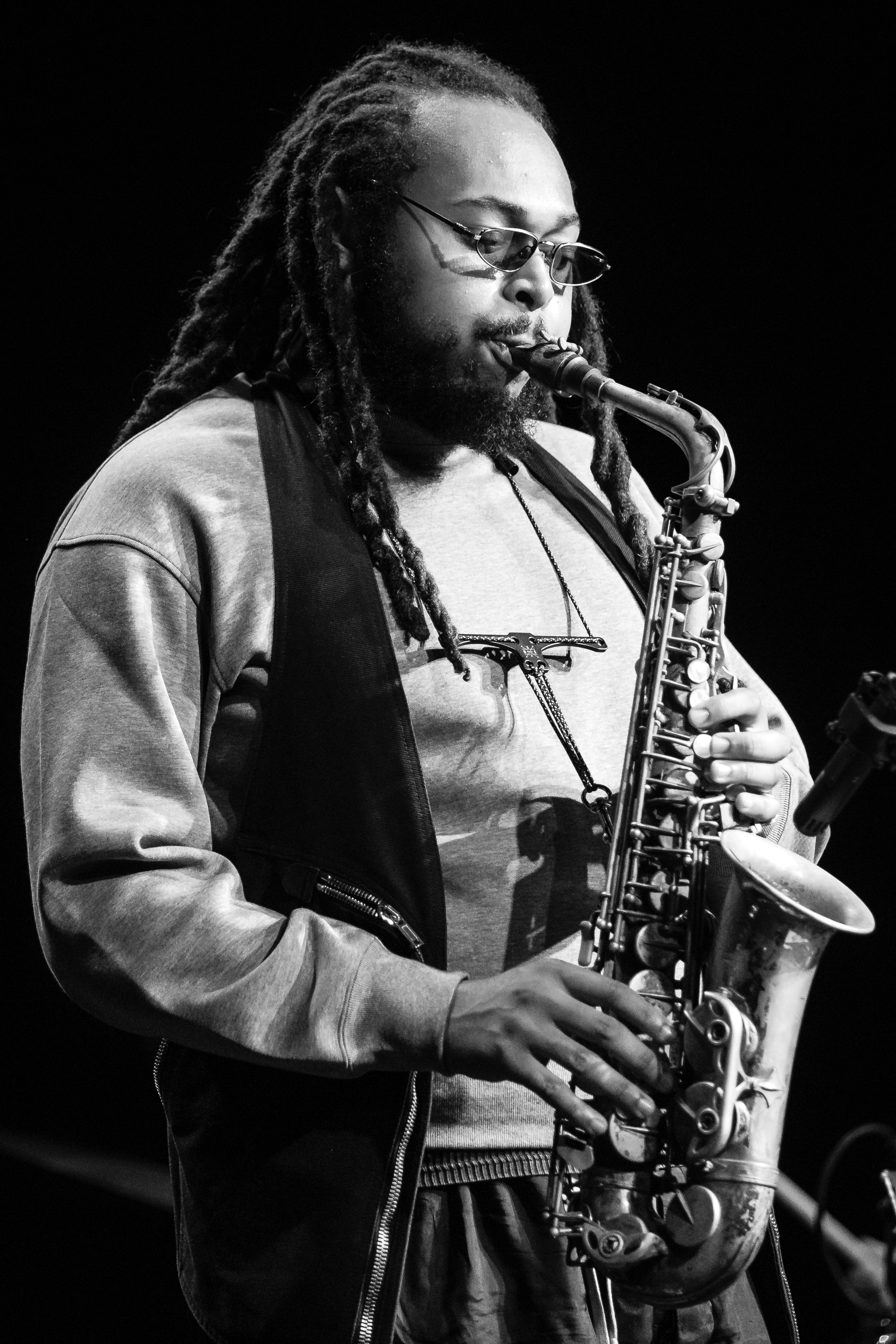

Background information
- Born: August 7, 1997 (age 29); Philadelphia, Pennsylvania, US
- Genre: Jazz
- Instruments: Alto saxophone
- Website: immanuelwilkins.com

Immanuel Wilkins (born August 7, 1997) is an American jazz saxophonist.

== Life and work ==
Wilkins, who is of African American heritage, grew up in the Upper Darby neighborhood of Delaware County, Pennsylvania. He gained his first musical experiences in his community church, which led him to attend jazz courses at the Clef Club of Jazz and Performing Arts.

In 2009, as a teenager, he had the opportunity to perform the national anthem before the Philadelphia Eagles game.

Wilkins studied at the Juilliard School under Bruce Williams, Steve Wilson, and Joe Temperley.

Wilkins led his own band in the late 2010s, performing his own compositions and performing at jazz clubs and venues such as The Jazz Gallery, Smoke, Jamaica Center of Arts and Smalls.

In 2020, he presented the debut album Omega, which he had recorded with Micah Thomas, Daryl Johns, and Kweku Sumbry.

Wilkins is a member of Johnathan Blake's quintet with Dezron Douglas, David Virelles, and Joel Ross. He also contributed to Good Vibes' first two albums KingMaker (2019) and Who Are You? (2020), as well as Johnathan Blake's 2021 album, Homeward Bound (2021) and Kalia Vandever's 2022 album, Regrowth.

Immanuel Wilkins and Sidra Bell received the 2023 Creative Capital Award in Performing Arts for Communion, a dance and jazz performance focusing on the ascendancy of community, compromise, effortfulness, support, simplicity, and love, which premiered in May 2024 at Gibney Dance Center, New York City.

Wilkins was featured on a cover of "Sleigh Ride" on the 2024 charity Christmas album A Philly Special Christmas Party by The Philly Specials.

For the 2026 Grammy Awards, he received a nomination for the album Blues Blood in the Best Alternative Jazz Album category.

In 2026 he was awarded a MacArthur Foundation Genius Grant.

== Discography ==
=== As leader ===
- Omega (Blue Note Records, 2020)
- The 7th Hand (Blue Note Records, 2022)
- Blues Blood (2024)
- Immanuel Wilkins Quartet: Live at the Village Vanguard Vol. 1 (Blue Note Records, 2026)
- Immanuel Wilkins Quartet: Live at the Village Vanguard Vol. 2 (Blue Note Records, 2026)
- Immanuel Wilkins Quartet: Live at the Village Vanguard Vol. 3 (Blue Note Records, 2026)

=== As a sideman ===
- Johnathan Blake, Homeward Bound (Blue Note Records, 2021)
- Johnathan Blake, Passage (Blue Note Records, 2023)
- Michael Dease, Father Figure (Posi-Tone Records, 2016)
- Orrin Evans, The Magic of Now (Smoke Sessions Records, 2021)
- Joe Farnsworth, In What Direction Are You Headed? (Smoke Sessions Records, 2023)
- James Francies, Purest Form (Blue Note Records, 2021)
- Giveton Gelin, True Design (2020)
- Harish Raghavan, Calls for Action (Whirlwind Recordings, 2019)
- Joel Ross, KingMaker (Blue Note Records, 2019)
- Joel Ross, Who Are You? (Blue Note Records, 2020)
- Joel Ross, The Parable of the Poet (Blue Note Records, 2022)
- Joel Ross, nublues (Blue Note Records, 2024)
- Kalia Vandever, Regrowth (New Amsterdam Records, 2022)
- Noam Wiesenberg, Roads Diverge (Brooklyn Jazz Underground, 2018)
- Dutch Williams, Maaj Paaj (EFFESS Records, 2023)
- Ben Wolfe, Fatherhood (Resident Arts Records, 2019)
- Ben Wolfe, Unjust (Resident Arts Records, 2023)
- Various Artists, Kimbrough (Newvelle Records, 2021)
- Kenny Barron, Beyond This Place (Artwork, 2024)
