= The 7th Hand =

Studio album by Immanuel Wilkins
- Released: January 28, 2022; 3 years ago
- Studio: Sear Sound, New York City
- Genre: Post Bop, Spiritual jazz
- Length: 58:46
- Label: Blue Note

Immanuel Wilkins chronology
Omega (2020)	The 7th Hand (2022)

The 7th Hand is the second studio album by American jazz bandleader Immanuel Wilkins. It was released on January 28, 2022, under Blue Note Records.

== Critical reception ==
Professional ratings
Aggregate scores
Source	Rating
Metacritic	87/100
Review scores
Source	Rating
AllMusic	4/5 stars
PopMatters	8/10

The 7th Hand was met with acclaim from critics. At Metacritic, which assigns a weighted average rating out of 100 to reviews from mainstream publications, this release received an average score of 87, based on 4 reviews. Giovanni Russonello writes in The New York Times, "The 7th Hand," Wilkins's newly released second album, confirms the quartet's commanding status on the scene. Another collection of all originals, it is just as unrelenting as "Omega." On tunes like "Don't Break" and "Shadow," Wilkins and Thomas play the melody in loosely locked unison, shifting in and out of keys, tilting and rocking the harmonic floor beneath them. Moving like this, Wilkins can switch emotional registers, even genres, with the flick of a wrist: A simple blues lick transposes into what sounds like a heart-tugging soul line, then scrambles up into something that's undeniably jazz"

Thom Jurek from AllMusic writes "The 7th Hand is a major work. It travels dazzlingly from tranquility and comfort to ambivalence, restlessness, and impatience before it engages re-entry, rebirth, and transcendence. This band understands that Wilkins' bold question may be unanswerable, but they play as if they know. They commit to asking it with music-making as compelling and inspired as it is exploratory and dazzling."

=== Accolades ===
Publications' year-end list appearances for The 7th Hand
Critic/Publication	List	Rank	Ref
AllMusic	AllMusic's Top Albums of 2022	NA	
The New York Times	New York Times' Best Jazz Albums of 2022	#2	
Jazzwise	The 20 Best Jazz Albums of 2022	#3	
JazzTimes	Top 40 Jazz Albums of 2022	#1	

== Track listing ==
The 7th Hand track listing
No.	Title	Length
1.	"Emanation"	7:23
2.	"Don't Break"	3:34
3.	"Fugitive Ritual, Selah"	5:47
4.	"Shadow"	4:44
5.	"Witness"	3:38
6.	"Lighthouse"	7:23
7.	"Lift"	26:17
