= New Gospel Revisited =

Live album by Marquis Hill

Live album by Marquis Hill
- Released: March 18, 2022
- Recorded: December 8, 2019
- Venue: Constellation, Chicago, Illinois
- Genre: Jazz
- Length: 1:16:19
- Label: Edition Records
- Producer: Marquis Hill

Marquis Hill chronology
Soul Sign (2020)	New Gospel Revisited (2022)	Rituals + Routines (2023)

New Gospel Revisited is a live album by American jazz trumpeter Marquis Hill, recorded at the Constellation in Chicago on December 8, 2019, and released by Edition Records March 18, 2022. It is a re-recording of the material on his 2011 debut album New Gospel, plus five other compositions by him.

== Critical reception ==
Professional ratings
Review scores
Source	Rating
AllMusic	4/5 stars

Phil Freeman, writing on Stereogum's "Ugly Beauty: The Month in Jazz" column, called the album "harmonically complex, melodically subtle hard bop in the spirit of the late ’80s/early ’90s Young Lions era, albeit more interested in collective virtuosity than skyrocketing fireworks displays by the leader." Thom Jurek, writing for AllMusic, gave the album four stars, stating that "New Gospel Revisited showcases Hill as a deeply committed jazzman leading an inspired band that fires on all cylinders."

== Track listing ==
All tracks written by Marquis Hill

1. Intro – 1:44
2. Law & Order – 14:11
3. Walter Speaks – 2:16
4. The Believer – 9:17
5. Oracle – 2:10
6. New Gospel – 6:04
7. Lullaby – 3:21
8. Autumn – 9:44
9. New Paths – 2:24
10. A Portrait of Fola – 10:42
11. Perpetual – 1:27
12. The Thump – 8:03
13. Farewell – 4:56

== Personnel ==
- Marquis Hill - trumpet
- Walter Smith III - tenor saxophone
- Joel Ross - vibraphone
- James Francies - piano
- Harish Raghavan - bass
- Kendrick Scott - drums
