= Theo Hill =

- Born: May 22, 1982 (age 43); Albany, New York, U.S.
- Genres: Jazz
- Occupation: Musician
- Instrument: Piano
- Years active: 2000s–present
- Label: Posi-Tone
- Website: www.theoshill.com

Theo Hill (born May 22, 1982) is an American jazz pianist. He has recorded four albums as a leader.

== Biography ==
Theo Hill was born and raised in Albany, New York, United States. He began playing piano at age five, and graduated from the Jazz Conservatory of the State University of New York at Purchase in 2004 with a Bachelor of Arts, cum laude.

Hill’s first CD, Theo Hill Quartet: Live at Smalls (SmallsLive), was released in January 2015 and features Dayna Stephens on saxophone, Mark Whitfield, Jr. on drums, Joe Sanders on bass, and Rodney Green on drums. In The New York Times, Nate Chinen described Live at Smalls as a fine album and characterized Hill as "a painterly young pianist with a chamber-like approach to composition".

His sophomore effort Promethean (Posi-Tone Records) was released in May 2017 featuring sidemen Yashushi Nakamura on bass and Mark Whitfield, Jr. on drums. Brian Zimmerman of DownBeat gave the album an Editors’ Choice review, commenting that Hill's “formidable piano chops and probing arrangements make [the] album such a winning statement.”

Hill's latest album, Interstellar Adventures (Posi-Tone Records), was released in June 2018 and features Rudy Royston on drums and Rashaan Carter on bass. It received a 4 1/2-star rating from DownBeat a four star review from All About Jazz which noted Hill's "steady, determined ascent into the contemporary ranks of vital and inspired jazz pianists", and the July 2018 issue of The New York City Jazz Record observed that "[t]here’s not a weak spot on the record", complimented Royston and Carter as a "phenomenal" rhythm section, and noted that Rashaan Carter is "a real under-the-radar master".

Hill is based in New York and frequently appears at popular jazz clubs, including Smalls Jazz Club, Mezzrow, and Fat Cat. He frequently appears with the Mingus Big Band, Frank Lacy, Bill Saxton, Josh Evans, and T. S. Monk.

== Discography ==
=== As leader ===
Year recorded	Title	Label	Personnel/Notes
2015	Theo Hill Quartet: Live at Smalls	SmallsLive Records	Dayna Stephens (saxophone), Mark Whtifield, Jr. (drums), and Rodney Green (drums)
2017	Promethean	Posi-Tone	Yasushi Nakamura (bass) and Mark Whitfield, Jr. (drums)
2018	Interstellar Adventures	Posi-Tone	Rashaan Carter (bass) and Rudy Royston (drums)
2020	Reality Check	Posi-Tone	Rashaan Carter (bass), Mark Whitfield, Jr. (drums), and Joel Ross (vibraphone)

=== As sideman ===
Year recorded	Leader	Title	Label
2015	David Gibson	BOOM	Posi-Tone Records
