= Marquis Hill =

American jazz trumpeter (born 1987)

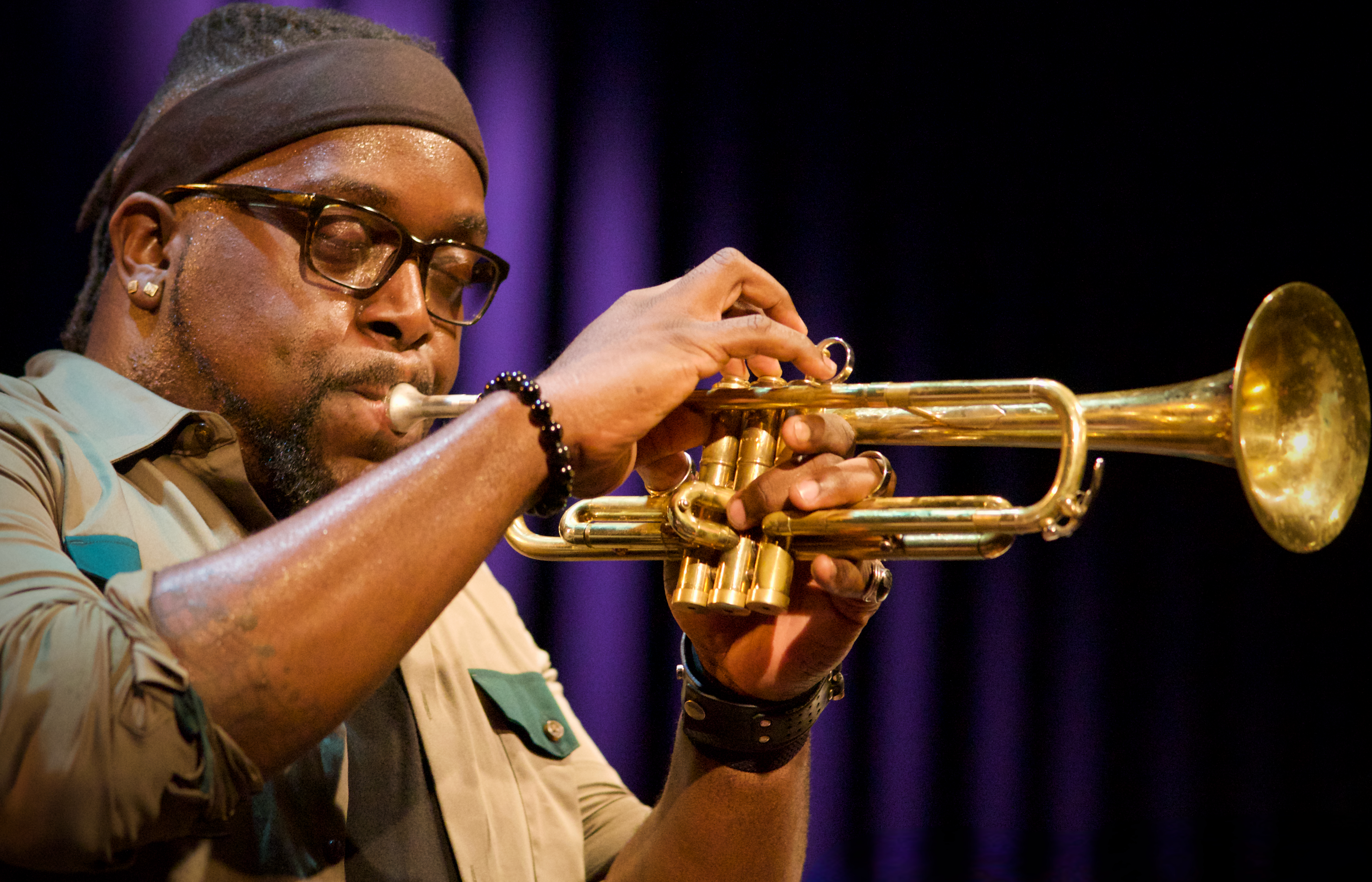
- Marquis Hill (2019)

Background information
- Born: April 15, 1987 (age 39); Chicago, Illinois, U.S.
- Genres: Jazz
- Occupation: Musician
- Instruments: Trumpet, flugelhorn
- Years active: 2011–present
- Labels: Black Unlimited Music Group, Black On Purpose, Concord Jazz, Edition
- Member of: Marquis Hill Blacktet
- Website: Official website

Marquis Hill (born April 15, 1987) is an American jazz trumpet player, composer, and bandleader from Chicago, Illinois. His musical style stems from African-American music, incorporating hip-hop, R&B, Chicago house, neo-soul, and jazz into his playing. In 2014 Hill won the Thelonious Monk Institute of Jazz International Trumpet Competition. He strongly advocates for the education of the next generation of musicians through active mentoring, treating the music he creates as a living art.

== Biography ==
Marquis Hill was born on the south side of Chicago in 1987. As a child, he began playing the drums in the 4th grade, however switched to trumpet in the 6th grade after hearing his older cousin practice her trumpet in the same building. After his band director, Diane Ellis, gave him a recording of Lee Morgan's Candy, he fell in love with jazz. Other early influences of Hill include Dizzy Gillespie, Donald Byrd, Woody Shaw, and Kenny Dorham.

In high school, Hill studied trumpet with Pharez Whitted as well as Tito Carrillo.

Hill attended Northern Illinois University to study music education for his undergraduate where he studied trumpet with Mark Ponzo and worked closely with Ron Carter. Hill was recruited to Northern Illinois University by Carter via the now defunct South Shore Youth Jazz Ensemble. After completing his undergraduate at Northern Illinois University, he received his master's degree in Jazz Education from DePaul University. Upon graduating from DePaul, Hill moved to New York City in 2014.

== Awards and honors ==
Hill is the winner of several prestigious music awards. In 2012, he won first place in the International Trumpet Guild's Jazz Improvisation Competition. In 2013, he won first in the Carmine Caruso International Jazz Trumpet Solo Competition and in 2014, he won the Thelonious Monk Institute of Jazz International Trumpet Competition (now known as the Herbie Hancock Institute of Jazz). Winning the Thelonious Monk competition also resulted in a recording contract with Concord Music from which Hill recorded his album The Way We Play (2016).

== Recent activity ==
Marquis Hill plays with his own group, the Marquis Hill Blacktet which formed in 2011. He has recently toured with Marcus Miller.

In 2022, Hill toured both North America and Europe in conjunction with the release of his album New Gospel Revisited. The album features new arrangements and conceptualizations of his first album, New Gospel, from a decade prior.

== Discography ==
=== As Leader ===
- 2011 – New Gospel (self-released)
- 2012 – Sounds of the City (self-released)
- 2013 – The Poet (Black Unlimited Music Group)
- 2014 – Modern Flows EP, Vol. 1 (MHillmusic)
- 2016 – The Way We Play (Concord Jazz)
- 2017 – Escape Lane with Jeff Parker, Joachim Florent, and Denis Fournier (The Bridge Sessions)
- 2017 – Meditation Tape (Black Unlimited Music Group)
- 2018 – Meditation Tape (King Legend/Mic West Takeover) (Black Unlimited Music Group)
- 2018 – Modern Flows Vol. 2 (Black Unlimited Music Group)
- 2019 – Love Tape (Black Unlimited Music Group)
- 2020 – Love Tape: With Voices (Black Unlimited Music Group)
- 2020 – Soul Sign (Black Unlimited Music Group)
- 2021 – Soul Sign Instrumental (Black Unlimited Music Group)
- 2021 – Everybody's Waltz with Helen Sung (JMI Recordings)
- 2022 – New Gospel Revisited (Edition)
- 2022 – The Chicago Experiment with Greg Spero, Makaya McCraven, Joel Ross, Irvin Pierce, Jeff Parker, and Darryl Jones (Ropeadope)
- 2023 – The Chicago Experiment: Revisited with Greg Spero, Makaya McCraven, Joel Ross, Irvin Pierce, Jeff Parker, and Darryl Jones (Ropeadope)
- 2023 – Rituals + Routines (Edition)
- 2024 – Composers Collective: Beyond the Jukebox (Black Unlimited Music Group)
- 2026 – Beautifulism (Sweet Surrender) (Black Unlimited Music Group)

=== Singles and EPs ===
- 2017 – "Fantasy" (Tiffany Gouche' cover) [feat. Harold Green III] (Skipstone)
- 2017 – "Coming out of the Universe" (feat. Marvin Bugulu Smith) (Black On Purpose)
- 2018 – "Ego vs. Spirit" (Black Unlimited Music Group)
- 2018 – "Kiss and Tell" (Black Unlimited Music Group)
- 2019 – "To You I Promise" (Black Unlimited Music Group)
- 2019 – "Wednesday Love" (Black Unlimited Music Group)
- 2020 – "They Say This is Love" (Black Unlimited Music Group)

=== As sideman ===
- 2014 — Chinchano by Juan Pastor Chinchano (eyes&ears Records)
- 2014 — Perdido by Dillard Center for the Arts Jazz Ensemble
- 2015 — Far From Home by Boney James (Concord Jazz)
- 2015 — A New Kind of Dance by Mike Reed's People, Places & Things
- 2015 — Foundation by Rajiv Halim
- 2015 — The Return of the Gentleman (feat. Marquis Hill) by LBJ
- 2017 — Rocket Love (feat. Marquis Hill & Morris Pleasure) by J.P. Floyd
- 2018 — Sin Sentido (feat. Ana Tijoux and Marquis Hill) by Stu Mindeman
- 2020 — Born To Die by Robin Mckelle (Doxie Records)
- 2020 — Endless Lawns (feat. Marquis Hill) by Kurt Elling (Kurt Elling Inc.)
- 2020 — EXHALE.als ZENG (Ropeadope)
- 2020 — Maxwell Street by Greg Spero (Tiny Records)
- 2020 — It's Sunny feat. Marquis Hill by G. Thomas Allen
- 2021 — I Want to Sing My Heart Out in Praise Of Life by Adi Meyerson (independent)
- 2025 – Nougayork Remixes by Claude Nougaro and Philippe Saisse (Parlophone France)
