= Gospel Music (album) =

2026 studio album by Joel Ross

Studio album by Joel Ross
- Released: January 30, 2026
- Genre: Jazz
- Label: Blue Note

Joel Ross chronology
Nublues (2024)	Gospel Music (2026)

Gospel Music is an album by American jazz vibraphonist Joel Ross, released on January 30, 2026, by Blue Note Records

== Critical reception ==
Professional ratings
Review scores
Source	Rating
AllMusic	4.5/5 stars
PopMatters	7/10

Kevin Le Grende of Jazzwise stated that, "His interpretation of both personal faith and black church traditions, specifically those of his hometown Chicago, is refreshing."

Lucinda Williams, writing in The Observer, stated that "Across 17 tracks, Ross displays the breadth of his arranging skill"

== Track listing ==
All tracks written by Joel Ross

1. Wisdom Is Eternal (For Barry Harris)
2. Trinity (Father, Son and Holy Spirit)
3. Protoevangelium (The First Gospel)
4. Hostile
5. The Shadowlands
6. Nevertheless
7. Word for Word
8. Repentance
9. The Sacred Place
10. A Little Love Goes A Long Way
11. Praise To You, Lord Jesus Christ
12. Calvary
13. The Giver
14. To The Throne (The Mercy Seat)
15. Be Patient
16. The New Man
17. Now & Forevermore

== Personnel ==
- Joel Ross – vibraphone
- Josh Johnson – alto saxophone
- María Grand – tenor saxophone
- Jeremy Corren – piano
- Kanoa Mendenhall - bass
- Jeremy Dutton – drums
