= In These Times (Makaya McCraven album) =

Studio album by Makaya McCraven
- Released: September 23, 2022
- Genre: Jazz
- Length: 41:12
- Label: International Anthem; Nonesuch; XL

Makaya McCraven chronology
Deciphering the Message (2021)	In These Times (2022)	Off the Record (2025)

Singles from In These Times
- 1. "Seventh String" Released: June 21, 2022; 2. "Dream Another" Released: July 19, 2022; 3. "The Fours" Released: September 13, 2022

In These Times is the sixth studio album by American musician Makaya McCraven. It was released on September 23, 2022, by International Anthem Recording Company, Nonesuch Records, and XL Recordings. The release features collaborations with Jeff Parker, Brandee Younger, Macie Stewart, Junius Paul, Marta Sofia Honer, and Lia Kohl.

== Production ==
The album tracks were completed over a period of seven years, and constructed in five different studios and four live performance spaces.

== Background ==
On June 23, 2022, Makaya McCraven announced the release of the new album. The first single "Seventh String" was released alongside the announcement.

The second single "Dream Another" was released on July 19, 2022. The music video for the single, which is directed by Nik Arthur, features photographic animations in the style of a zoopraxiscope.

McCraven released the third single "The Fours" on September 13, 2022.

== Critical reception ==
Professional ratings
Aggregate scores
Source	Rating
AnyDecentMusic?	7.9/10
Metacritic	87/100
Review scores
Source	Rating
AllMusic	4.5/5 stars
Clash	8/10
Exclaim!	9/10
The Line of Best Fit	8/10
Pitchfork	8/10
Sputnikmusic	4.1/5

In These Times was met with "universal acclaim" reviews from critics. At Metacritic, which assigns a weighted average rating out of 100 to reviews from mainstream publications, this release received an average score of 87, based on 11 reviews. Aggregator AnyDecentMusic? gave the release a 7.9 out of 10 based on a critical consensus of 7 reviews.

Thom Jurek of AllMusic described the album as its "own jazz labyrinth, and as such is destined for repeated listening and startling discovery." At Clash, Robin Murray wrote: "A challenging yet continually beautiful project, In These Times contains a terrific sense of unity, one that belies the lengthy manner of its gestation."

Stereogum made the album as their "Album of the Week" on September 20, 2022.

=== Accolades ===
Publications' year-end list appearances for In These Times
Critic/Publication	List	Rank	Ref
Loud and Quiet	Loud and Quiet's Top 40 Albums of 2022	14	
Norman Records	Norman Records' Top 50 Albums of 2022	12	
NPR Music	NPR Music's Top 50 Albums of 2022	7	
Passion of the Weiss	Passion of the Weiss' Top 50 Albums of 2022	3	
Stereogum	Stereogum's Top 50 Albums of 2022	37	
Stereogum	Stereogum's Top 10 Jazz Albums of 2022	1	

== Commercial performance ==
In These Times ranked at number 85 in Scotland, number 56 in Germany, and number 92 in Switzerland.

== Track listing ==
In These Times track listing
No.	Title	Length
1.	"In These Times"	7:09
2.	"The Fours"	3:26
3.	"High Fives"	3:39
4.	"Dream Another"	3:12
5.	"Lullaby"	3:33
6.	"This Place That Place"	3:56
7.	"The Calling"	1:47
8.	"Seventh String"	3:05
9.	"So Ubuji"	3:01
10.	"The Knew Untitled"	4:27
11.	"The Title"	3:57
Total length:		41:12

== Charts ==
Chart performance for In These Times
Chart (2022)	Peak position
Belgian Albums (Ultratop Flanders)	74
German Albums (Offizielle Top 100)	56
Portuguese Albums (AFP)	48
Scottish Albums (Official Charts)	85
Swiss Albums (Schweizer Hitparade)	92
UK Independent Albums (Official Charts)	23
