= Max Gerl =

American musician

- Born: 1992 (age 32–33); Dallas, Texas
- Genres: Jazz; Jazz fusion
- Occupation: Musician
- Instrument(s): double bass, electric bass
- Website: www.maxgerl.com

Max Gerl (born 1992) is an American bass player and jazz musician. Gerl has performed internationally at venues including the Monterey Jazz Festival, North Sea Jazz Festival, and Ronnie Scott's Jazz Club.

Gerl grew up in a family of musicians in Dallas, Texas. He first learned the piano and alto saxophone, and switched to the electric bass at the age of eleven under the influence of a Led Zeppelin DVD. He also took double bass lessons starting at the age of 15. After high school, he studied at the Berklee College of Music in Boston with John Patitucci, Steve Bailey, James Genus, Victor Bailey, Bruce Gertz, Tia Fuller and Hal Crook.

Gerl moved to New York City in 2017. From there he toured the United States and Europe with pianist Cameron Graves, and participated in the album Seven (2021). In 2019 he moved to Los Angeles, CA. He worked with Dan Kye, Makaya McCraven, James Francies, Stanley Clarke, Tia Fuller, Shaun Martin, Bernard Wright and Chris Cheek.

At the end of 2019, he released his debut album Tbilisi on Dolfin Records with saxophonist Aaron Shaw, pianist Paul Cornish and drummer Mike Mitchell. With Greg Spero's band Spirit Fingers he released Peace in 2020. Sasha Berliner brought him into her group, Tabula Rasa, for the SWR New Jazz Meeting 2021.

Gerl released his first solo album, Max Gerl, on July 28, 2023, with the New York jazz label JMI Recordings, which specializes in analog recording. Max Gerl was produced by bassist Stanley Clarke alongside associate producer Steven Mandel. The album includes five free improvisation tracks. JMI Recordings released Gerl's Max Gerl Trio, featuring Brian Richburg Jr. on drums and Yesseh Furaha-Ali on tenor saxophone in February, 2025.

== Discography ==
=== Studio albums ===
==== Solo albums ====
Title	Label	Release date	Personnel	Format
Max Gerl	JMI Recordings	July 28, 2023	Produced by Stanley Clarke. Associate Producer: Steven Mandel	LP, digital

==== As lead artist ====
Title	Label	Release date	Personnel	Format
Max Gerl Trio	JMI Recordings	2025	Brian Richburg Jr. (drums) and Yesseh Furaha-Ali (tenor saxophone)	LP, digital
Hard Pan	JMI Recordings	2024	Max Gerl & Mike Mitchell	LP, digital
Tbilisi	Dolfin Records	December 10, 2019	Max Gerl (Acoustic and Electric Bass), Aaron Shaw (Tenor Saxophone), Paul Cornish (Piano), Mike Mitchell (Drums)	CD, digital

==== As featured ====
Title	Label	Release date	Personnel	Format
Seven	Mack Avenue Records	February 19, 2021	Cameron Graves (piano, vocals). Featuring Max Gerl (bass), Mike Mitchell (drums), Colin Cook (guitar), and Kamasi Washington (tenor saxophone)	LP, CD, digital
Peace		2020	Greg Spero + Spirit Fingers (Max Gerl, Mike Mitchell, Dario Chiazzolino)	CD, digital
