= Reed Easterwood =

- Reed Easterwood at The Granada Theatre in Dallas, TX. (2007)

Background information
- Origin: Dallas, Texas, United States
- Genres: Rock, Indie
- Instruments: Guitar, Vocals
- Years active: 1990–present
- Member of: Junky Southern

Reed Easterwood (born February 27, 1967) is a guitarist, producer, and songwriter currently living in the Southwest United States.

His music has been included both on major motion picture and independent soundtracks. He has toured with MC 900 Ft. Jesus, Jack Ingram, Meredith Miller and 1100 Springs.

He has released an album on independent label Parallax Records, called Pawn Shop From Heaven. Additionally, Easterwood has distributed four albums independently under his own music company called 2 27 L'mtd. Music Productions. His own band is called Junky Southern, and when he plays, it is either under this name with a full group or by solo performance under his own name.

Reed Easterwood has produced albums and/or tracks for Jack Ingram, Eleven Hundred Springs, Meredith Miller, Cottonmouth Texas, Pleasant Grove, Bryan Wakeland, and Nick Brisco among others. He is affiliated with production team/artists Hydroponic Sound System and has also done session work as a multi-instrumentalist for Chuck Raney, Phil Pritchett and Milton Mapes to name a few.

== Discography ==
=== Solo ===
- Absolute Blue (1998)

=== Band ===
- Junky Southern, Pawn Shop from Heaven (1996, Parallax Records)
