= Greg Spero =

American musician

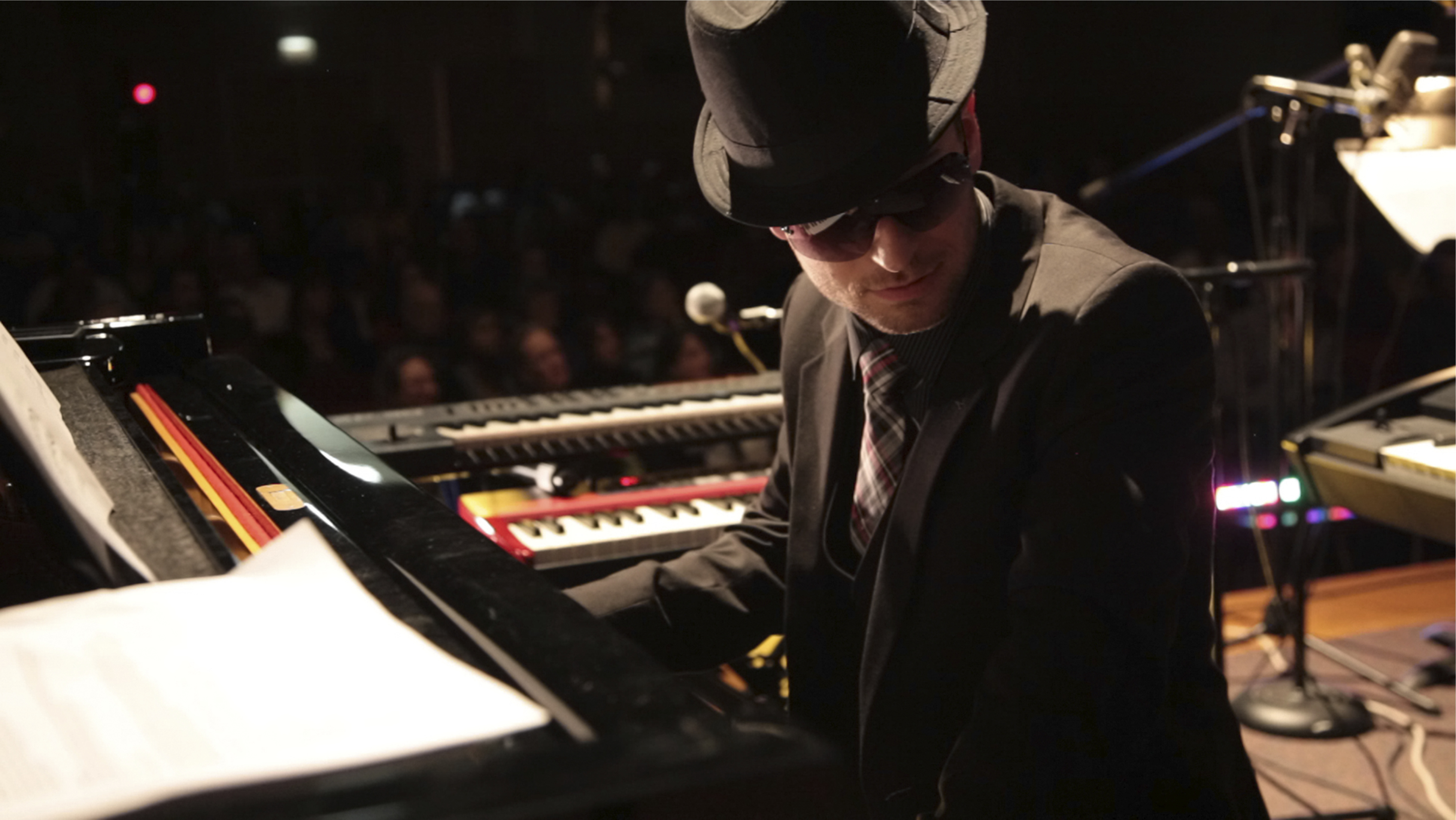
Greg Spero performing at the Ikeda Auditorium in Chicago, Illinois

Greg Spero (born February 22, 1985) is an American pianist from Highland Park, Illinois. He has toured with Halsey and the Miles Electric Band and has composed music for film and television. He leads the jazz band Spirit Fingers, (Max Gerl, Mike Mitchell, Dario Chiazzolino). He also runs a label called Tiny Room, which runs live streamed sessions from its studio in Los Angeles and has been featured on NPR Live Sessions. When the coronavirus pandemic caused live music to cease in 2020, he launched a startup called weeBID which is the first fan initiated crowd funding platform. Spero was described as "a new breed of record exec, at the vanguard of big changes in music industry". He outlined his vision for weeBID at the Center for Creative Entrepreneurship, Chicago in August 2021.

== Career ==
Spero's mother was a classical pianist and his father was a blues pianist. When he was fourteen, he joined his father's band. He also worked with Frank Catalano, Buddy Rich, and Robert Irving III. Spero became a devotee of Nichiren Buddhism through Herbie Hancock, whom he met at the Ravinia Festival.

In 2009, he launched a jazz piano masterclass channel on YouTube called weeklypiano.

His album Radio Over Miles (2010) is a combination of Miles Davis' and Radiohead's music. The album was nominated for Best Jazz Album at the Chicago Music Awards. Spero's album Live in Toronto is "sold" at a karmic price; the download is available for free in exchange for karma. "Purchasers" have to check a box agreeing to complete four karmic transactions to include giving "five random smiles to people on the street, regardless of age, sex, or looks." His album Acoustic (2011) is in a piano trio setting.

In 2014, Spero began performing with pop artist Halsey. Between 2014 and his leave in 2018, Spero designed and performed all the synthesizer and keyboard parts for her live shows, at such venues as Madison Square Garden, Allstate Arena, and The Forum. Spero and Halsey also performed on such late night TV shows as Jimmy Kimmel Live!, The Tonight Show Starring Jimmy Fallon, The Today Show, and The Late Show with Stephen Colbert. On January 19, 2018, Spero performed live on Saturday Night Live with Halsey. That day, he announced that he would be leaving the group to pursue his band Spirit Fingers full time, along with curating a video series called Tiny Room out of his Los Angeles studio.

In 2015, while on tour with Halsey, Spero began composing for his new project which would eventually be named Spirit Fingers. Spero accrued musicians Hadrien Feraud, Mike Mitchell, and Dario Chiazzolino to join the group. They recorded their debut record on Shanachie Records, released on March 16, 2018, and reached number 11 on the iTunes Jazz chart and number 20 on the Billboard Contemporary Jazz chart.

Although he has composed and performed jazz, his interest in other styles afforded him opportunities to record with Ski Beatz, Shock G, and American rapper Murs. Spero has also written songs with Darryl Jones. He composed music for the Feltre Theater performances of Eugène Ionesco's Exit the King, two Tennessee Williams one-act plays, and for the film The Perfect Breakup.

He has performed with Arturo Sandoval, Corey Wilkes, and co-produced tracks with Ski Beatz (of Jay Z) and Shock G.

In 2020, he founded a startup company called Weebid, which is a crowdfunded marketplace for artists to interact with their fans.

== Discography ==
- Fossil Fuels in the House that Mouse Built (Bucket Shop, 2002)
- Live in 25 (Greg Spero Trio, 2005)
- The Mighty Burner (Frank Catalano, 2006)
- GMG (Greg Spero, Makaya McCraven, Graham Czach), 2008
- Radio Over Miles (Greg Spero, 2010)
- Frank Russell (Frank Russell, 2011)
- Acoustic (Greg Spero, 2011)
- Electric (Greg Spero, 2014)
- PEACE (with Spirit Fingers, 2020)
