= Mike Mitchell (drummer) =

Jazz drummer

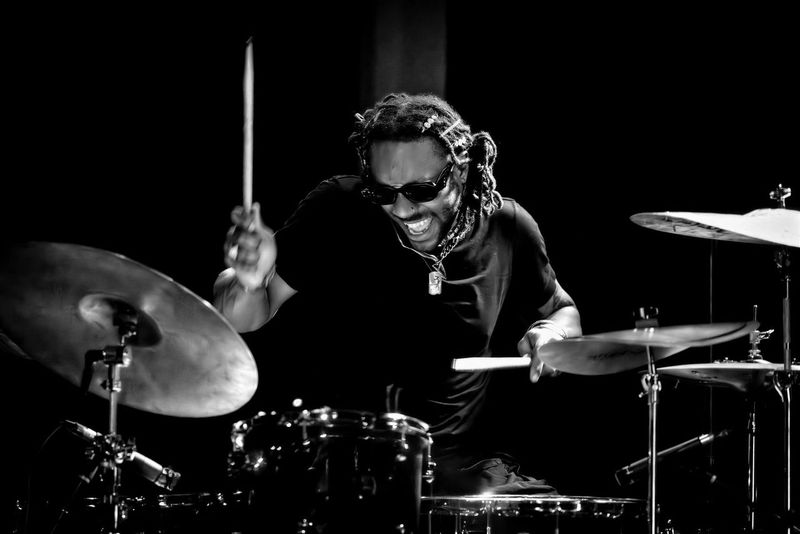
- Mike Mitchell at Missy Lanes in Durham, NC, 2025. Photo by Robert Birnbach

Background information
- Born: 1994 (age 31–32); Fort Worth, Texas
- Genres: Jazz, Jazz fusion, Hip-hop
- Website: blaquedynamite.com

Mike Mitchell (born 1994) also known as Blaque Dynamite, is an American drummer from Dallas, Texas, who plays across jazz, hip-hop, and jazz fusion. He is part of Greg Spero's group, Spirit Fingers. Mitchell has played with Erykah Badu, Herbie Hancock, Stanley Clarke, Willow Smith, Derrick Hodge, Christian McBride, Kamasi Washington and others.

Mitchell began touring with Stanley Clarke band before graduating from the Booker T. Washington High School for the Performing and Visual Arts in Dallas.

He also performed at the 2012 International Jazz Day performance with the Thelonious Monk Institute of Jazz and Herbie Hancock. Mike Mitchell cites influences from Tony Williams, Jack DeJohnette, and Lenny White to Mitch Mitchell, Keith Moon, and John Bonham.

== Studio albums ==
=== As lead artist ===
Title	Label	Release date	Personnel	Format
Hard Pan	JMI Recordings	2024	Max Gerl & Mike Mitchell	LP, digital
Blaque Dynamite	JMI Recordings	2023		LP, digital
Stop Calling Me	Dolfin Records	2023		
Blue Wig - Remixes	Dolfin Records	2023		EP
Time Out	Dolfin Records	2020		
Killing Bugs	Dolfin Records	November, 2017		
Wifi	Legends Way Ent	January, 2015		

=== As featured ===
Title	Label	Release date	Personnel	Format
Tbilisi	Dolfin Records	December 10, 2019	Max Gerl (acoustic and electric bass), Aaron Shaw (tenor saxophone), Paul Cornish (piano), Mike Mitchell (drums)	CD, digital

== See also ==
- List of jazz drummers
