= Joel Ross (vibraphonist) =

American jazz musician (born 1995)

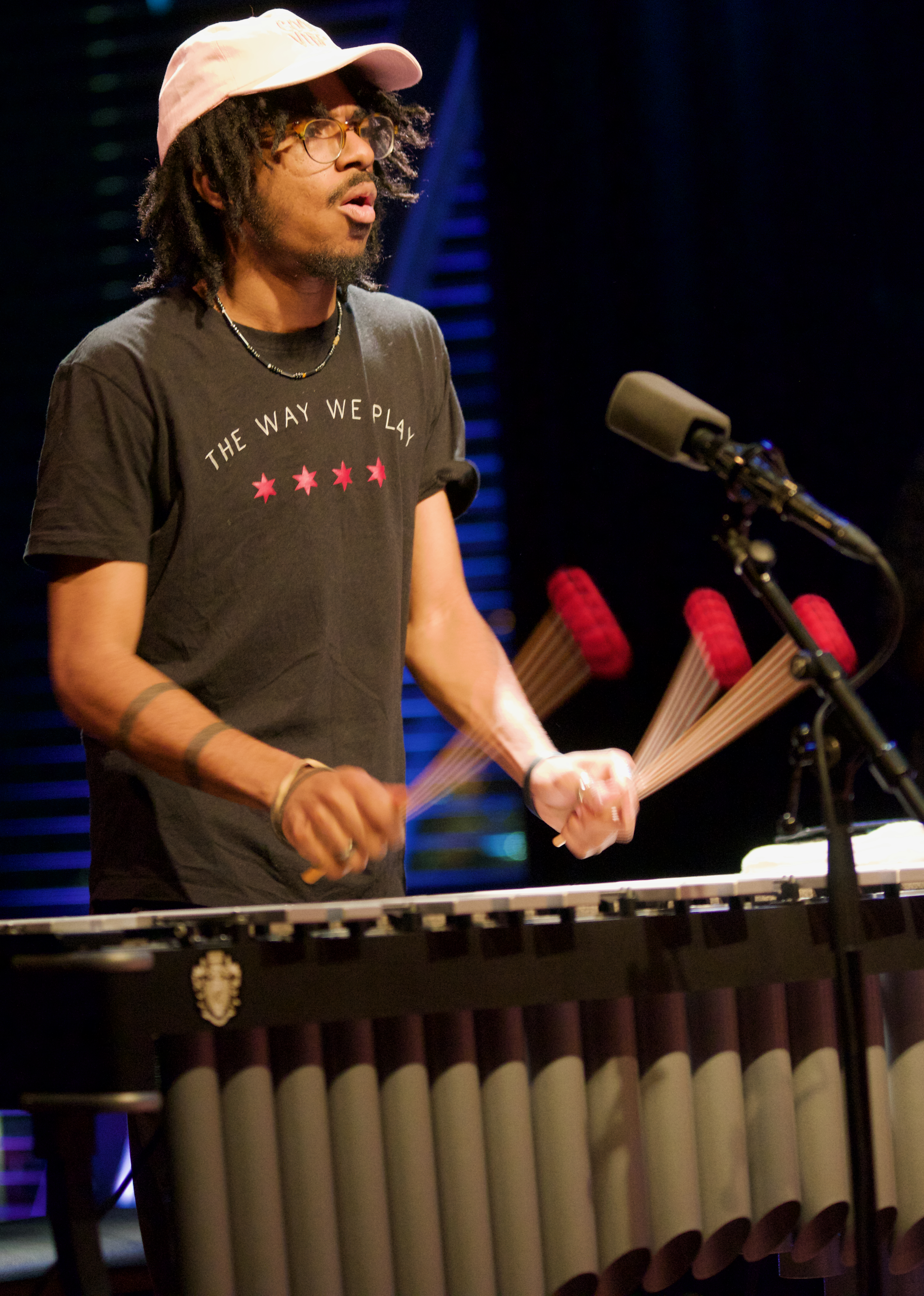
- Ross in 2017

Background information
- Born: 1995 (age 30–31); South Side, Chicago
- Genre: Jazz
- Instrument: Vibraphone
- Label: Blue Note
- Member of: Good Vibes
- Partner: Laura Bibbs
- Education: Chicago High School for the Arts; University of the Pacific; School of Jazz and Contemporary Music
- Website: iplayvibes.com

Joel Ross (born 1995) is an American jazz vibraphonist currently living in Brooklyn. Born and raised in Chicago, he was introduced to music by playing drums at his father's church, and got a musical education in high school and college. He later moved to New York City, where he developed into a professional jazz musician, signing with Blue Note Records.

== Biography ==
Ross, the child of two police officers, was born in 1995 in the South Side of Chicago. He, along with his twin brother, Josh, began learning drums at the age of three, playing at a Baptist church where their father was choir director. Growing up, Ross listened to gospel and R&B, as well as classic jazz records from Milt Jackson, Miles Davis, Thelonious Monk and John Coltrane, with Jackson being Ross's formative influence on vibraphone. He joined a middle school band at age ten, and switched to playing xylophone, as Josh got the drum slot. He also played in All City concert and jazz bands, comprising musicians from multiple schools, in addition to working with the Jazz Institute of Chicago.

Ross and his brother would later enroll at the Chicago High School for the Arts in 2009, the school's opening year, studying under flutist Nicole Mitchell. The school's partnership with the Jazz Institute of Chicago served as a conduit for Ross to meet older musicians such as Herbie Hancock, Gerald Clayton, and Stefon Harris, the latter of whom Ross met backstage at the Chicago Jazz Festival. Clayton, who visited Ross's high school as a guest artist, introduced Ross to other musicians of his generation, including Robert Glasper, Ambrose Akinmusire, and J Dilla.

At Harris's prompting, Ross auditioned for and won a spot in the Brubeck Institute Jazz Quintet. At the Institute, he studied under Harris for two years. In 2015, Ross moved to New York City to study music at The New School, where he formed his band Good Vibes. He dropped out of the university due to schedule constraints, but later took up virtual classes to complete his degree while in quarantine during the COVID-19 pandemic.

After Ross dropped out of college, he toured with the Marquis Hill Blacktet, in which his vibraphone was the primary comping instrument. Ross made his recording debut as a leader on his album KingMaker for in December 2016. It was released on Blue Note Records in 2019, after Ross was brought to the attention of label executive Don Was by his son, Sol Was. That same year, Ross recorded his second album as a leader, Who Are You?, wishing to showcase how his band had developed since KingMaker was recorded.

== Playing style ==
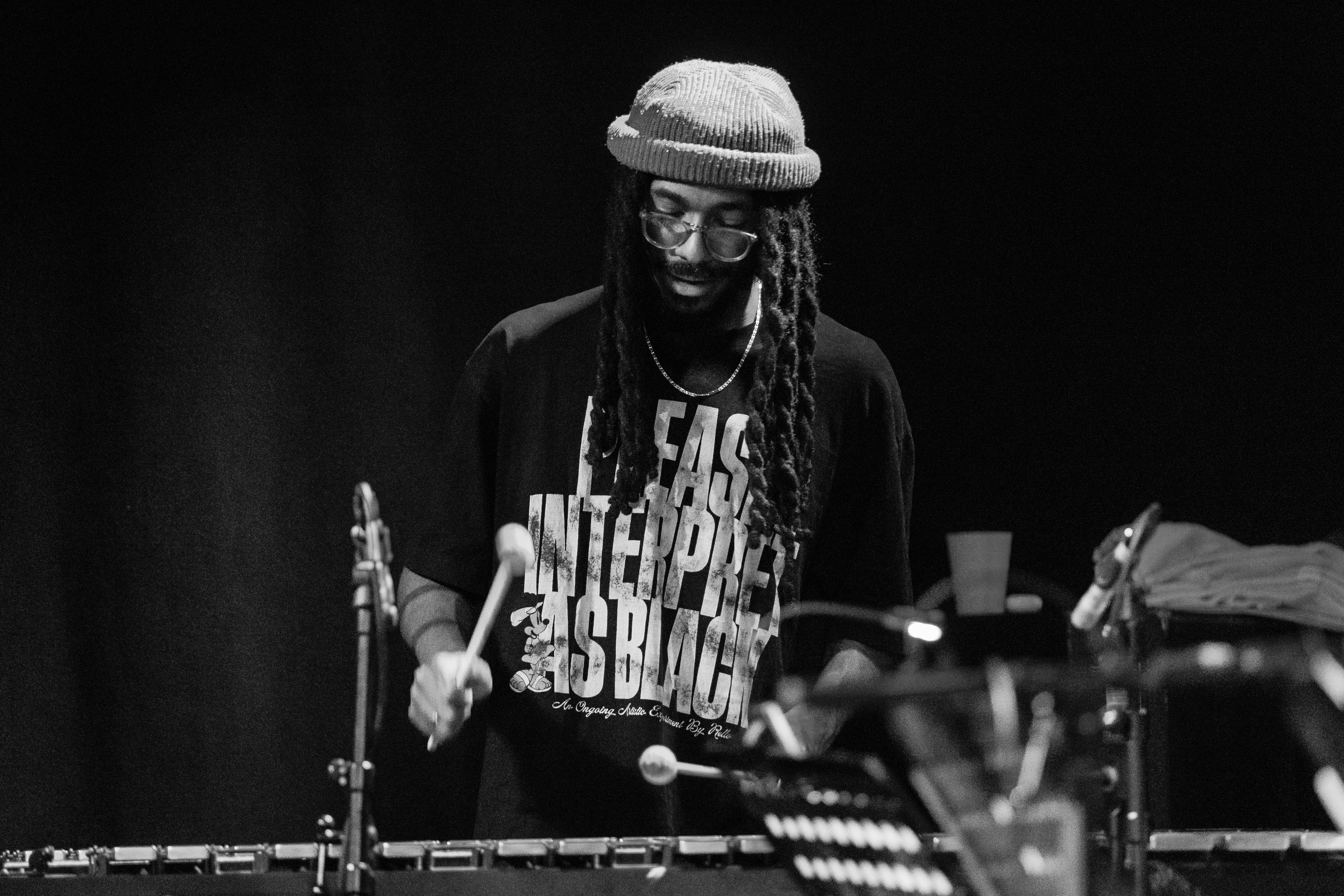
Ross at the Kongsberg Jazzfestival in 2023

Despite playing the vibraphone, Ross has called it his "least favorite instrument", stating "I have a love-hate relationship with the vibraphone ... it's cold metal bars. It's really hard to get expression out of it. That's the challenge. So that's how I come at it, as a challenge." Unlike many contemporary jazz vibraphonists, he plays with two mallets, not four, so as to avoid dictating harmony. To keep each note distinct, Ross avoids overusing the pedal on a vibraphone, which can blur them together.

Rhythm is given special weight in Ross's music. When he leads a group, the members do not all play with the same pulse, so as to allow them to "[talk] to each other with different forms of rhythm", an approach inspired by Miles Davis's Second Great Quintet. Ross's compositions often begin with a vamp and develop from that, and shift rhythms throughout.

== Awards ==
- Selected for the Thelonious Monk Institute All-Star Sextet in 2013.
- First place in the "Rising Star Vibraphone" category in the 67th Annual DownBeat Critics Poll
- First place in the "Vibraphone" category in the 69th, 70th, and 71st Annual DownBeat Critics Polls
- First place in 2020 and 2021 Jazz Journalists Association Critics Poll for Mallet Instrumentalist of the Year
- Winner of the 2020 Jazz International Edison Award for the album KingMaker.

== Discography ==
=== As leader ===
- KingMaker (Blue Note, 2019)
- Who Are You? (Blue Note, 2020)
- The Parable of the Poet (Blue Note, 2022)
- nublues (Blue Note, 2024)
- Gospel Music (Blue Note, 2026)

=== As sideman ===
==== With Makaya McCraven ====
- Universal Beings (International Anthem, 2018)
  - Universal Beings E&F Sides (International Anthem, 2020)
- (With Gil Scott-Heron, posthumously) We're New Again (XL, 2020)
- Deciphering the Message (Blue Note, 2021)
- In These Times (Nonesuch, 2022)

==== With others ====
- Ulysses Owens – Falling Forward (Spice of Life, 2017)
- James Francies – Flight (Blue Note, 2018)
- Marquis Hill – Modern Flows Vol. 2 (Black Unlimited Music Group, 2018)
- Walter Smith III & Matthew Stevens – In Common (Whirlwind, 2018)
- Harish Raghavan – Calls For Action (Whirlwind, 2019)
- Melissa Aldana – Visions (Motéma Music, 2019)
- Godwin Louis – Global (Blue Room, 2019)
- Jure Pukl – Broken Circles (Whirlwind, 2020)
- Peter Evans – Being & Becoming (More is More, 2020)
- Theo Hill – Reality Check (Posi-Tone, 2020)
- Rob Mazurek – Dimensional Stardust (International Anthem/Nonesuch, 2020)
- Marquis Hill – New Gospel Revisited (Edition, 2022)
- Harish Raghavan – In Tense (Whirlwind, 2022)
- Ant Law & Alex Hitchcock – Same Moon In The Same World (Outside in Music, 2022)
- Brandee Younger – Brand New Life (Impulse!, 2023)
- Greg Spero – The Chicago Experiment: Revisited (Ropeadope, 2023)
- Johnathan Blake – Passage (Blue Note, 2023)
- Ben Wolfe – Unjust (Resident Arts, 2023)
- Peter Evans – Ars Memoria (More is More, 2023)
