= Makaya McCraven =

American jazz drummer and bandleader (born 1983)

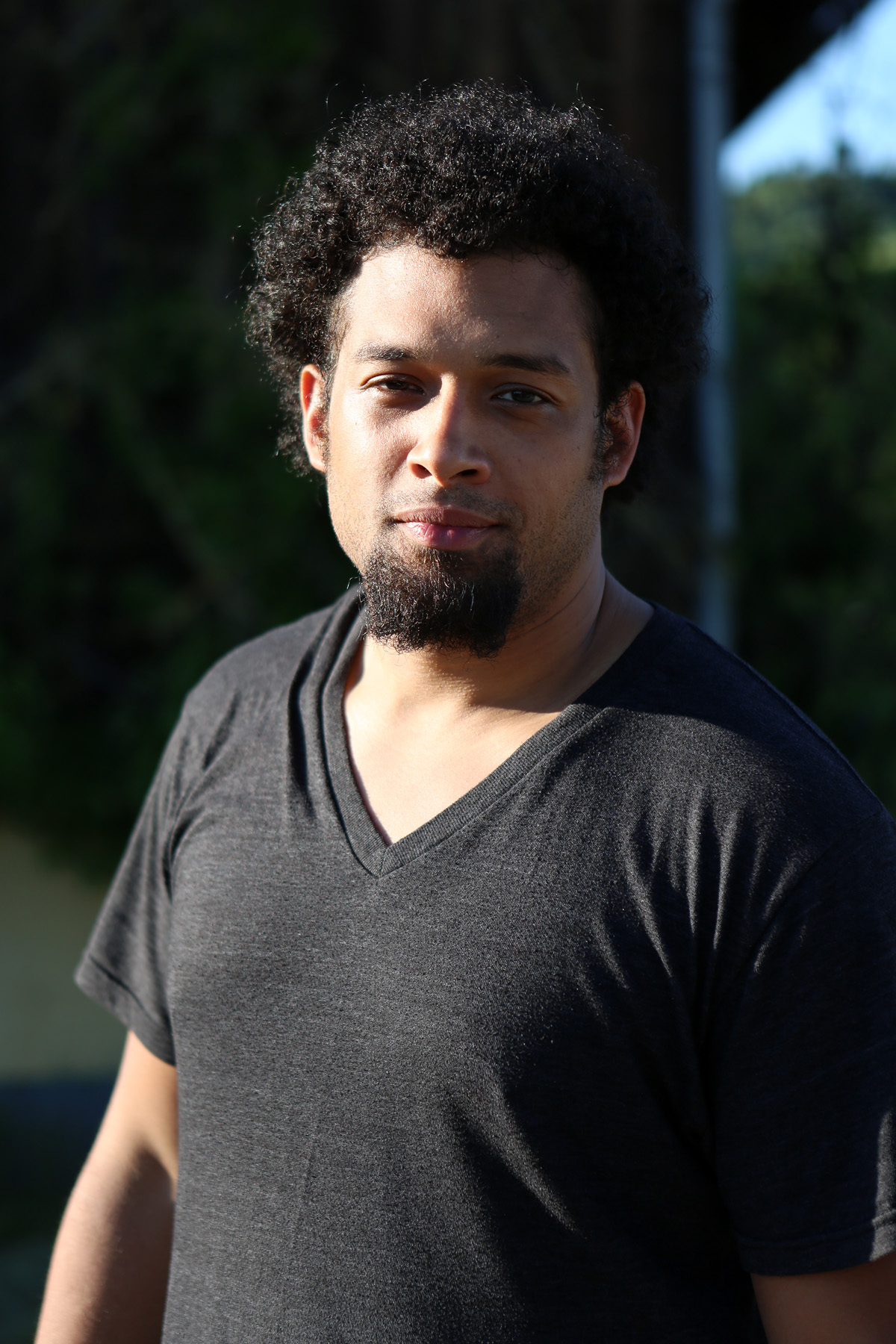
- McCraven in 2013

Background information
- Born: October 19, 1983 (age 42); Paris, France
- Genre: Jazz
- Occupation: Musician
- Instrument: Drums
- Years active: 2007–present
- Labels: Blue Note; International Anthem; Nonesuch; XL
- Formerly of: Cold Duck Complex
- Website: www.makayamccraven.com

Makaya McCraven (born October 19, 1983) is an American jazz drummer and bandleader.

== Life and career ==
McCraven was born in Paris, France, to jazz drummer Stephen McCraven and Hungarian singer Ágnes Zsigmondi (of the band Kolinda), and from the age of three was raised in and around Amherst and Northampton, Massachusetts. At the age of five, he played in his father's drum ensemble, the CMSS Bashers, along with some of his father's students. In middle school, he and friends formed a band to accompany his mother's folk singing. In high school, McCraven formed the jazz-hip hop Cold Duck Complex. He studied music at the University of Massachusetts Amherst, becoming part of the university's jazz orchestra and receiving various DownBeat student awards, but did not graduate.

In 2007, McCraven moved to Chicago, where he performed in the bands of Bobby Broom, Corey Wilkes, Willie Pickens, and with the Occidental Brothers, Marquis Hill, and Jeff Parker. He also worked as a studio musician for Apollo Sunshine and Kris Delmhorst. In 2012, he released his debut album, Split Decision, through Chicago Sessions, leading a trio. In the following years, he appeared weekly with other musicians, from which he developed concepts for his 2015 album, In the Moment. He also performed with Kamasi Washington. In 2016, he toured mostly in Europe.

After several mix tapes, in 2018 he released the double album Universal Beings, on which he was joined by musicians from New York City, London, and Los Angeles; the album was nominated for the Jazz Journalists Association Awards in 2019. In DownBeat's 2020 Critics Poll, he was the winner in the "Rising Star" categories of best producer and best drummer of the year. In 2022, McCraven released In These Times, an album that had been in development since 2015, through International Anthem.

McCraven is married to Nitasha Tamar Sharma, a professor of African-American and Asian-American Studies at Northwestern University as of 2018.

== Discography ==
=== Albums ===
- GMG (with Greg Spero and Graham Czach; 2008)
- Bassprint (with Marlene Rosenberg, Geoff Bradfield, and Scott Hesse, as Marlene Rosenberg Quartet; 2012)
- Split Decision (2012)
- In the Moment (International Anthem Recording Company, 2015)
- In the Moment Remix Tape (International Anthem Recording Company, 2015)
- Highly Rare (International Anthem Recording Company, 2017)
- Where We Come From (Chicago x London Mixtape) (International Anthem Recording Company, 2018)
- Universal Beings (International Anthem Recording Company, 2018)
- Moving Cities (with Antoine Berjeaut; I See Colors, 2019)
- We're New Again: A Reimagining by Makaya McCraven (with Gil Scott-Heron [posthumously]; XL Recordings, 2020)
- Universal Beings E&F Sides (International Anthem Recording Company, 2020)
- Deciphering the Message (Blue Note Records, 2021)
- In These Times (Nonesuch Records/XL Recordings, 2022)
- Off the Record (International Anthem Recording Company/Nonesuch Records/XL Recordings, 2025)
