= The Movement Revisited =

The Movement Revisited: A Musical Portrait of Four Icons

Studio album by Christian McBride
- Released: February 7, 2020
- Recorded: September 8–11, 2013
- Studio: Avatar, New York City
- Genre: Jazz
- Length: 64:43
- Label: Mack Avenue MAC1082
- Producer: Christian McBride

Christian McBride chronology
Christian McBride's New Jawn (2018)	The Movement Revisited: A Musical Portrait of Four Icons (2020)	For Jimmy, Wes and Oliver (2020)

The Movement Revisited: A Musical Portrait of Four Icons is a studio album by American jazz bassist Christian McBride. The album was recorded in September 2013 but released on February 7, 2020 via the Mack Avenue label.

== Background ==
This album is dedicated to African-American history and presents sonic portraits of such black civil icons as Rosa Parks, Malcolm X, Martin Luther King Jr., Muhammad Ali, and Barack Obama narrated by the voices of Sonia Sanchez, Vondie Curtis-Hall, Dion Graham, and Wendell Pierce. McBride explained, "When I was a kid, I used to spend hours looking at old copies of Ebony and Jet magazines that my grandmother saved. To read contemporaneous writings by black writers about events and people who were my history – our history – that was absolutely fascinating to me. It was the greatest gift my grandmother could have given to me." The initial version of The Movement was recorded in 1998 as a four-movement suit dedicated to the first four personalities. To celebrate its tenth anniversary, McBride expanded and rewrote the album, adding Barack Obama to the list of his icons. To record the new album, he invited an 18-piece big band as well as a gospel choir. The new album was premiered in the Walt Disney Concert Hall. This is his magnum opus that has been 20 years in the making; it explores social themes that are just as actual today as they were over 50 years ago.

== Reception ==
Professional ratings
Review scores
Source	Rating
All About Jazz	4/5 stars
AllMusic	4.5/5 stars
DownBeat	3.5/5 stars
Jazz Journal	3/5 stars
Jazz Forum	4/5 stars
Jazzwise	4/5 stars
Morning Star	4/5 stars
Winnipeg Free Press	4.5/5 stars
Tom Hull	B+

In his review for AllMusic, Matt Collar called the album "a powerful and deeply considered work that invokes not just the words, but also the ebullient spirit of the civil rights movement." by George W. Harris of Jazz Weekly stated, "The beauty of this album is that it allows the words of the cultural giants speak for themselves, woven into the musical tapestry to serve as an inspiration and not an anvil. McBride is put on the map for an album that is both relevant musically as well as meaningful for a statement for how far we have come as a United States. Bravo." Jim Hines of Glide Magazine commented, "This stunning opus and continually evolving project combines elements of small jazz combos, gospel choir, big band, theater and dramatic, often starkly riveting and compelling spoken word through the voices of Sonia Sanchez, Wendell Pierce, Vondie Curtis-Hall, and Dion Graham."

DownBeat's Giovanni Russonello commented, "When the suite soars, it follows the bandleader’s strengths. The leading upright bassist of his generation, McBride is known for his ebullient precision—his joy in the details—and for savoring the nectar inside swing rhythm. This comes through strongest in his small groups, though he ought to be more recognized for his broad-minded writing for jazz orchestra, too." Ian Sinclair in his review for Morning Star stated, "It’s a fascinating and stirring set, with the music full of the melancholy of the black experience in the US, as well as joyous ecstasy." In her review for Winnipeg Free Press Keith Black wrote, "The music is a perfect container for the words. The large ensemble offers the appropriate mode for the topic; a big sound with serious depth. The ensemble writing is solid, with choral or solo portions that make the listener sit up and take notice." Chris May of All About Jazz called the album "an epic work".

== Track listing ==
All tracks are written by Christian McBride.

The Movement Revisited track listing
No.	Title	Length
1.	"Overture / The Movement Revisited"	10:44
2.	"Sister Rosa – Prologue"	03:20
3.	"Sister Rosa"	06:25
4.	"Rosa Introduces Malcolm"	03:08
5.	"Brother Malcolm – Prologue"	02:49
6.	"Brother Malcolm"	07:35
7.	"Malcolm Introduces Ali"	01:03
8.	"Ali Speaks"	02:42
9.	"Rumble in the Jungle"	06:00
10.	"Rosa Introduces MLK"	00:40
11.	"Soldiers (I Have a Dream)"	05:38
12.	"A View from the Mountaintop"	04:14
13.	"Apotheosis: November 4th, 2008"	10:26
Total length:		64:43

== Personnel ==
- Christian McBride – bass
- Steve Wilson – alto saxophone, flute
- Todd Bashore – alto saxophone
- Ron Blake – saxophone (tenor, soprano)
- Loren Schoenberg – tenor saxophone
- Carl Maraghi – baritone saxophone
- Michael Dease, Steve Davis, James Burton – trombone
- Doug Purviance – bass trombone
- Lew Soloff, Ron Tooley, Frank Greene, Freddie Hendrix, Darryl Shaw – trumpet
- Warren Wolf – vibraphone, timpani, tambourine
- Geoffrey Keezer – piano
- Terreon Gully – drums
- Alicia Olatuja, J.D. Steele, Sonia Sanchez, Dion Graham, Vondie Curtis-Hall, Wendell Pierce, Voices of the Flame – vocals

== See also ==
- List of 2020 albums
