= For Jimmy, Wes and Oliver =

Studio album by Christian McBride
- Released: September 25, 2020
- Recorded: Early 2019
- Studios: Sound on Sound Studios, Montclair, New Jersey
- Genre: Jazz
- Length: 1:11:48
- Label: Mack Avenue 1152
- Producer: Christian McBride

Christian McBride chronology
The Movement Revisited (2020)	For Jimmy, Wes and Oliver (2020)	Live at the Village Vanguard (2021)

Professional ratings
Review scores
Source	Rating
AllMusic	4/5 stars
DownBeat	4/5 stars
Jazz Journal	3.5/5 stars
Jazzwise	4/5 stars
Tom Hull	B+

For Jimmy, Wes and Oliver is a studio album by American jazz bassist Christian McBride together with his big band. Mack Avenue Records released the album on September 25, 2020. This is the third release for McBride's big band; the band received Grammy Awards for its first two albums: The Good Feeling (2011) and Bringin' It (2017). The album also produced two singles: "Don Is" and "Medgar Evers Blues".

== Background ==
The album is dedicated to jazz musicians Jimmy Smith, Wes Montgomery, and Oliver Nelson. The release is a mix of big band and quartet titles. McBride interprets 1966 recordings by Wes Montgomery and Jimmy Smith that produced the albums The Dynamic Duo and Further Adventures of Jimmy and Wes. For the recordings in his hometown of Montclair, New Jersey, McBride invited guitarist Mark Whitfield and organist Joey DeFrancesco, who takes on the role of Smith. Ten tracks were recorded: cover versions of the 1966 sessions, the original compositions ("Medgar Evers Blues" by Whitfield and "Pie Blues" by McBride and DeFrancesco), jazz compositions by Freddie Hubbard and Miles Davis ("Miles" from the 1958 album Milestones), and standards (such as "The Very Thought of You", "Down by the Riverside" and "I Want to Talk About You"). Four tracks were recorded by a quartet consisting of McBride, Mark Whitfield, Joey DeFrancesco, and Quincy Philips; the other six tracks are big-band recordings that mostly interpret the originals by Oliver Nelson. McBride explained, "Joey [DeFrancesco] is, without question, my oldest friend in music... We met in middle school playing in the Settlement Music School Jazz Ensemble in Philadelphia. We've recorded a few things here and there over the years, but we've never recorded an entire album together until now. It seemed logical to salute the two albums that we listened to quite a bit as kids."

== Reception ==
JazzTimes review by Thomas Conrad stated, "This is not an album for adventurous listeners who require risk in their jazz. But this conservative, impeccably executed music is full of joie de vivre. In times like these, who can’t use more of that?" Matt Collar of AllMusic observed, "For Jimmy, Wes, and Oliver is an ebullient album that evokes the earthy, artful spirit of the trio who inspired it." John White of Jazz Journal mentioned, "This third release, if not quite up to the standards of the first two, and with a slightly misleading title, has much to recommend it." Matt Silver of WRTI wrote, "the fellas are so in their element here suggests that the boys will, indeed, always be boys." Gary Fukushima of DownBeat added, "More than 50 years ago, two musicians at the height of their careers met to make essential recordings. It's nice to know that sort of thing can still happen in 2020."

The album won Grammy Award for Best Large Jazz Ensemble Album at the 64th Annual Grammy Awards in 2022.

== Track listing ==
No.	Title	Writer(s)	Length
1.	"Night Train"	Jimmy Forrest, Oscar Washington	5:21
2.	"Road Song"	Wes Montgomery	6:39
3.	"Up Jumped Spring"	Freddie Hubbard	8:12
4.	"Milestones"	Miles Davis	3:47
5.	"The Very Thought of You"	Ray Noble	8:33
6.	"Down by the Riverside"	Traditional	8:20
7.	"I Want to Talk About You"	Billy Eckstine	7:18
8.	"Don Is"	Joey DeFrancesco	6:32
9.	"Medgar Evers Blues"	Mark Whitfield	7:13
10.	"Pie Blues"	Christian McBride, Joey DeFrancesco	9:53
Total length:			1:11:48

== Personnel ==
- Christian McBride – producer, bass
- Joey DeFrancesco – organ
- Mark Whitfield – guitar
- Quincy Phillips – drums
- Frank Greene, Freddie Hendrix, Brandon Lee, Nabate Isles, Anthony Hervey – trumpet
- Michael Dease, Steve Davis, James Burton, Douglas Purviance – trombone
- Steve Wilson – saxophone (alto, soprano)
- Todd Bashore – alto saxophone
- Ron Blake – tenor saxophone
- Dan Pratt – tenor saxophone
- Carl Maraghi – baritone saxophone
