= Live at the Village Vanguard (2021 Christian McBride album) =

2021 live album by Christian McBride

Live album by Christian McBride
- Released: November 26, 2021
- Recorded: December 5–7, 2014
- Venue: Village Vanguard
- Genre: Jazz
- Length: 69:45
- Label: Mack Avenue MAC 1192
- Producer: Christian McBride, Maria Ehrenreich

Christian McBride chronology
For Jimmy, Wes and Oliver (2020)	Live at the Village Vanguard (2021)	Prime (2023)

Professional ratings
Review scores
Source	Rating
All About Jazz	4.5/5 stars
AllMusic	4/5 stars
DownBeat	4.5/5 stars
Financial Times	4/5 stars
Jazzwise	4/5 stars

Live at the Village Vanguard is a live album recorded by American jazz bassist Christian McBride with his band Inside Straight. Mack Avenue released the album on November 26, 2021, mentioning that this is the companion album for his 2015 record of the same name. This is McBride's twelfth release with Mack Avenue Music Group.

== Background ==
McBride and his group Inside Straight of saxophonist Steve Wilson, pianists Eric Reed and Peter Martin, vibraphonist Warren Wolf, and drummer Carl Allen, have performed annually at the New York jazz club Village Vanguard starting from 2007 and been interrupted only by the lockdown as a result of the COVID-19 pandemic. McBride has recorded two studio albums with Inside Straight, Kind of Brown in 2009 and People Music in 2013; by this time Peter Martin had taken over the pianist position from Reed.

Recorded in December 2014, Live at the Village Vanguard contains seven tracks including versions of three tracks from each of their previous studio albums and a new track, "Sweet Bread". The album should not be confused with McBride's album of the same name, Live at the Village Vanguard, that he and his trio (featuring Christian Sands and Ulysses Owens, Jr.) recorded at the same venue a week earlier and released via Mack Avenue in 2015.

== Reception ==
Brian Priestley of Jazzwise wrote: "The excitement of the performance communicates to the audience (and vice versa), while the intensity of the mostly long tracks ensures that you don’t notice the length." Mike Jurkovic of All About Jazz noted: "McBride needs no further introduction save to say he has heightened fun into an art form. His playing, even at its most pensive and persuasive, proclaims that better times are here even if just for the immediate moment. The immediate gig. This immediate assemblage of keen minded, high flying musicians. And this is their last set of the three-night stand so they'd like to play for you now." Matt Collar of AllMusic commented: "Of course, pulling all of this together is McBride, whose robust and sinewy basslines remain as impressive as ever." David Whiteis of Jazz Journal added: "McBride, as always, is strong-fingered and nimble, attaining a remarkable variety of tonal colorations while maintaining his rhythmic sureness even as he bends, twists, and contorts the tunes’ metric structures to his own ends: a paradigm of unforced, unselfconscious virtuosity."

== Track listing ==
No.	Title	Writer(s)	Length
1.	"Sweet Bread"	Wolf	12:01
2.	"Fair Hope Theme"	McBride	13:41
3.	"Ms. Angelou"	Wilson	10:02
4.	"The Shade of the Cedar Tree"	McBride	8:18
5.	"Gang Gang"	Wolf	14:54
6.	"Uncle James"	McBride	10:57
7.	"Stick & Move"	McBride	9:52
Total length:			69:45

== Personnel ==
- Christian McBride – bass
- Steve Wilson – saxophone (alto, soprano)
- Carl Allen – drums
- Peter Martin – piano
- Warren Wolf – vibraphone
