= Mark Whitfield =

American jazz guitarist (born 1966)

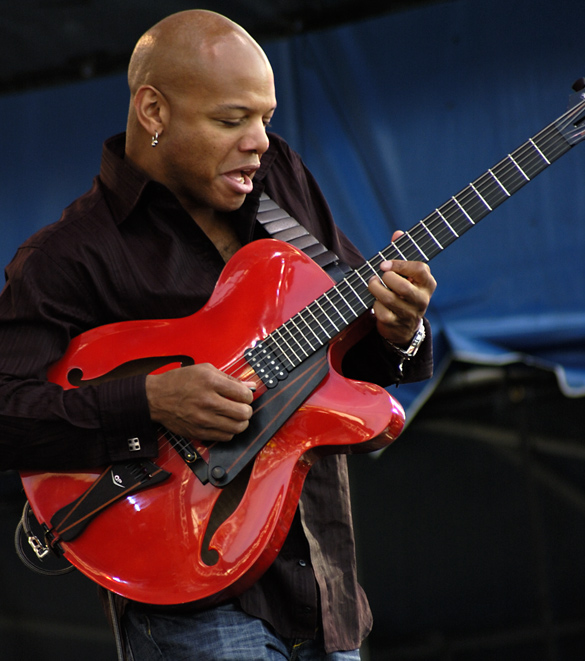
- Whitfield at the Newport Jazz Festival, 2006

Background information
- Born: Mark Adrian Whitfield; October 6, 1966 (age 59); Lindenhurst, New York, U.S.
- Genres: Jazz; soul jazz
- Occupation: Musician
- Instrument: Guitar
- Labels: Warner Bros.; Verve
- Website: www.markwhitfield.com

Mark Whitfield (born October 6, 1966) is an American jazz guitarist.

== Life and career ==
Whitfield was born in Lindenhurst, New York. He has worked with Jack McDuff, Jimmy Smith, Courtney Pine, Nicholas Payton, and Chris Botti.

In 2000, Whitfield released an instructional guitar video titled Mark Whitfield: Star Licks Master Sessions for Star Licks Productions. In 2017, he shot a series of instructional videos entitled Mark Whitfield: Land the Gig.

== Discography ==
=== As leader ===
Year released	Title	Label	Personnel / Notes
1990	The Marksman	Warner	With Marcus Roberts (piano), Reginald Veal (bass), Herlin Riley and Troy Davis (drums)
1991	Patrice	Warner	With Alvin Batiste (clarinet) Kenny Barron (piano), Ron Carter (bass), Jack DeJohnette (drums)
1993	Mark Whitfield	Columbia	With Greg Curtis (keyboards), Roland Guerin (bass), Troy Davis (drums), Daryl Burgee
1994	True Blue	Verve	With Nicholas Payton (trumpet), Branford Marsalis (sax), Kenny Kirkland (piano), Rodney Whitaker (bass), Jeff "Tain" Watts (drums)
1997	7th Ave. Stroll	Verve	With Tommy Flanagan and Stephen Scott (piano), Dave Holland and Christian McBride (bass), Al Foster and Gregory Hutchinson (drums)
1997	Forever Love	Verve	With Diana Krall (vocals), Jim Pryor (piano), Roland Guerin (bass), Donald Edwards (drums)
2000	Raw	Transparent Music	With Robert Glasper (piano), Brandon Owens (bass), Donald Edwards (drums)
2005	Mark Whitfield Featuring Panther	Diry Soap	With Antoine Drye (keyboard programming, producer, trumpet)George Fontenette (trumpet), Sy Smith (vocals, background vocals, keyboards), Gabriela Anders (background vocals), B.B. Moore (bass, vocals, background vocals), Chris E. Thomas (bass), Donald Edwards (art direction, drum programming, drums, keyboard bass, keyboards)
2009	Songs of Wonder	Marksman	With John Mayer and Chris Botti
2017	Grace	Marksman	With Sy Smith (vocal on track 3), Davis Whitfield (piano, producer), Yasushi Nakamura (bass), Mark Whitfield Jr. (drums, producer)
2017	Live & Uncut	Chesky	With Ben Allison (bass) and Billy Drummond (drums)

=== As sideman ===
With Javon Jackson

- Easy Does It (Palmetto, 2003)
- Have You Heard (Palmetto, 2005)

With Christian McBride

- Fingerpainting (Verve, 1997)
- For Jimmy, Wes and Oliver (Mack Avenue, 2020)

With Courtney Pine

- Modern Day Jazz Stories (Verve, 1995)
- Underground (Verve, 1997)

With Jimmy Smith

- Damn! (Verve, 1995)
- Angel Eyes: Ballads & Slow Jams (Verve, 1996)

With others

- Carl Allen, Testimonial (Atlantic, 1995)
- Sean Ardoin, Sean Ardoin 'n' ZydeKool (ZydeKool Records, 1999)
- Teodross Avery, My Generation (Impulse!, 1996)
- Beta Radio, Seven Sisters (Beta Radio, 2011)
- Pat Bianchi, East Coast Roots (Jazzed Media, 2006)
- Mary J. Blige, No More Drama (MCA, 2001)
- Chris Botti, In Boston (Decca, 2009)
- D'Angelo, Brown Sugar (EMI, 1995)
- Michael Dease, Grace (Jazz Legacy Productions, 2010)
- Russell Gunn, Blue On the D.L. (HighNote, 2002)
- Donald Harrison, Full Circle (Sweet Basil, 1990)
- Donald Harrison/Terence Blanchard, Black Pearl (Columbia, 1988)
- Conrad Herwig, Obligation (Criss Cross, 2005)
- Kirk Lightsey, Live at Smalls Jazz Club (Cellar Music, 2022)
- Hector Martignon, Refugee (Zoho, 2007)
- Peter Martin, New Stars from New Orleans (Paddle Wheel [Japan], 1994)
- Brother Jack McDuff, Bringin' It Home (Concord Jazz, 1999)
- Sarah McKenzie, Paris in the Rain (Impulse!, 2017)
- Jason Miles, To Grover with Love (ARTizen, 2006)
- Nicholas Payton, From This Moment (Verve, 1995)
- Special EFX, Here to Stay (JVC, 1997)
- Sy Smith, Sometimes a Rose Will Grow in Concrete (Psyko!, 2018)
- Camille Thurman, Inside the Moment (Chesky, 2017)
- Cedar Walton, Roots (Astor Place, 1999)
- Ernie Watts, The Long Road Home (JVC, 1996)
- James Williams, Classic Encounters! (DIW [Japan], 2000)
- Joe Zawinul Syndicate/Mark Whitfield Quartet/Wallace Roney Quartet, A-013 [live] (Jazz A Go-Go [Poland], 1995)
