= Without Further Ado, Vol 1 =

Studio album by Christian McBride Big Band
- Released: August 29, 2025
- Studios: Blue Engine Studios, NYC; Rocky Mountain Recorders, Denver; Sear Sound, NYC; The Power Station, NYC
- Genres: Neo-bop, post-bop, straight-ahead jazz
- Length: 37:10
- Label: Mack Avenue
- Producer: Christian McBride

Christian McBride chronology
But Who's Gonna Play the Melody? (2024)	Without Further Ado, Vol 1 (2025)

Professional ratings
Review scores
Source	Rating
The Absolute Sound	4/5 stars
Jazzwise	4/5 stars
Tom Hull	B+

Without Further Ado, Vol. 1 is a studio album by American jazz bassist, composer, and bandleader Christian McBride. Released on August 29, 2025, by Mack Avenue Records, the record is his 21st studio album and his first big band record in five years, following the Grammy-winning For Jimmy, Wes and Oliver (2020). The album features the Christian McBride Big Band and a roster of guest vocalists, including Sting, Andy Summers, Samara Joy, Cécile McLorin Salvant, and Dianne Reeves.

== Background ==
The album was produced by Christian McBride and was recorded at several studios in New York City, including the Power Station, Sear Sound, and Blue Engine Studios, with recording sessions taking place across 2022 and 2024. The album is the first volume in a planned series and is notable for its large ensemble and diverse array of guest artists.

The album's title and concept are partly inspired by McBride's role as the musical director for the New Jersey Performing Arts Center (NJPAC) in Newark, a position he has held since 2012. The guest vocalists and musicians featured on the record are artists who have performed at the venue, with the album effectively capturing the celebratory spirit of the center's gala evenings. In his acknowledgements, McBride paid tribute to Quincy Jones, citing him as an inspiration for his work on the album.

In an interview, McBride mentioned: "I really enjoy writing for big band, because it’s a particular art form, writing for large ensembles like that. I’ve been doing this now for a good 25-plus years, and so I enjoy writing for people to perform in my big band and writing my own music for the big band."

== Reception ==
The album won the Grammy Award for Best Large Jazz Ensemble Album.

Luca Conti of Musica Jazz wrote: "The record has everything needed to please the general public and those not normally drawn to jazz: it is impeccably polished, comfortably nostalgic, and reassuringly smooth." A reviewer of Glide Magazine stated that the alsbum "is as much a vocal album as a big band effort, and within those vocals lie several genres. Now, as surprising as that may sound, it is more typical of Christian McBride’s career than not. His versatility matches his virtuosity, and the former may well be his primary trait."

== Track listing ==
No.	Title	Writer(s)	Length
1.	"Murder by Numbers" (Feat. Andy Summers, Sting)	Andy, Sting	5:05
2.	"Back in Love Again" (Feat. Jeffrey Osborne)	Len Ron Hanks, Zane Grey	3:49
3.	"Old Folks" (Feat. Samara Joy)	Dedette Lee Hill, Willard Robison	4:19
4.	"Moanin'" (Feat. José James)	Bobby Timmons	6:18
5.	"All Through the Night" (Feat. Cécile McLorin Salvant)	Cole Porter	3:16
6.	"Will You Still Love Me Tomorrow" (Feat. Dianne Reeves)	Gerald Goffin, Carole King	6:17
7.	"Come Rain or Come Shine" (Feat. Antoinette Henry)	Johnny Mercer, Harold Arlen	3:38
8.	"Op. 49 — Cold Chicken Suite 3rd Movement"	Christian McBride	4:27
Total length:			37:10

== Personnel ==
- Christian McBride – acoustic bass, electric bass
- McClenty Hunter Jr. – drums
- Rodney Jones – guitar
- Xavier Davis – piano, electric piano, clavinet
