= Bringin' It =

Studio album by Christian McBride Big Band
- Released: September 22, 2017
- Studios: Avatar (New York, New York)
- Genre: Jazz
- Length: 1:08:55
- Label: Mack Avenue MAC1115
- Producer: Christian McBride

Christian McBride chronology
Flaga: Book of Angels Volume 27 (2016)	Bringin' It (2017)	Christian McBride's New Jawn (2018)

Professional ratings
Review scores
Source	Rating
All About Jazz	4.5/5 stars
AllMusic	4/5 stars
The Irish Times	4/5 stars
Jazz Trail	A
The Guardian	3/5 stars
Financial Times	3/5 stars
PopMatters	8/10 stars
Stereophile	5/5 stars
The Australian	4/5 stars
RTÉ.ie	4/5 stars
Record Collector	4/5 stars

Bringin' It is a studio album by jazz bassist Christian McBride together with his big band. The record was released on September 22, 2017, via the Mack Avenue label—both on CD and on LP. After The Good Feeling, this is his second album as a big band leader and his fourteenth overall. The album consists of 11 tracks: a mix of his own compositions and famous jazz standards, including a version of "Mr. Bojangles" featuring his wife, vocalist Melissa Walker. The album opens with the song "Gettin’ to It", which is the title of his 1994 debut album.

== Awards ==
Bringin' It won the Grammy Award for Best Large Jazz Ensemble Album at the 60th Annual Grammy Awards in 2018.

== Critical reception ==
Matt Collar of AllMusic wrote "Christian McBride's second big-band album, 2017's Bringin' It, is a robust, swaggeringly performed set of originals and standards showcasing his deft arranging skills and his ensemble's exuberant virtuosity. The album comes six years after his previous big-band outing, The Good Feeling, and once again finds the bassist conscripting a slew of his talented cohorts (some new, others returning), including saxophonists Steve Wilson and Ron Blake, trumpeters Freddie Hendrix and Brandon Lee, trombonist Steve Davis, pianist Xavier Davis, drummer Quincy Phillips, and others... With Bringin' It, McBride has ultimately crafted a big-band album that retains all of his own formidable, exuberant characteristics."

Dan Bilawsky of All About Jazz said "This album serves as the long-awaited follow-up to The Good Feeling, the group's Grammy-winning debut. And like its lauded predecessor, Bringin' It presents a tight and tasty program of music designed by McBride and bolstered by his bass. Everything you've come to expect from this musical dynamo—taste, punch, humor, intelligence, solid gold grooves, an appreciation for lyricism—is here for the taking. Styles and settings vary greatly from track to track and moment to moment, but this ensemble is remarkably consistent through it all".

John Fordham of The Guardian mentioned "McBride’s exciting big band is the perfect festival draw – steeped in old-school swing, Latin jazz, funk and Ray Charlesian soul-blues, bristling with hotshot soloists. The opening Gettin’ to It... is a genial swagger of blues hooks, slyly squealing trumpet-section riffs, and rhythm guitar drive. But after that effusive hello, the leader's craft and erudition bloom, in the boppishly Byzantine arrangement and pounding bass-walk of Freddie Hubbard's "Thermo", the bluesiness of Wes Montgomery's "Full House", and the impressionistic, then anthemic, visit to McCoy Tyner's "Sahara". McBride's originals are not quite so convincing, and there are a few band-bantering longueurs, but live, this punchy outfit could captivate the traditionalists and jazz hair-shirt wearers, too".

== Track listing ==
No.	Title	Writer(s)	Length
1.	"Gettin' to It"	McBride	6:37
2.	"Thermo"	Freddie Hubbard	5:59
3.	"Youthful Bliss"	McBride	6:59
4.	"I Thought About You"	James Van Heusen, Johnny Mercer	6:09
5.	"Sahara"	McCoy Tyner	10:09
6.	"Upside Down"	Djavan Caetano Viana, Regina Werneck	4:43
7.	"Full House"	Wes Montgomery	6:25
8.	"Mr. Bojangles"	Jerry Jeff Walker	6:16
9.	"Used 'Ta Could"	McBride	4:37
10.	"In the Wee Small Hours of the Morning"	Bob Hilliard, David Mann	3:55
11.	"Optimism"	Steve Davis	7:06
Total length:			1:08:55

== Personnel ==
- Christian McBride – bass
- Frank Greene – lead trumpet
- Freddie Hendrix – trumpet
- Brandon Lee – trumpet
- Nabate Isles – trumpet
- Michael Dease – lead trombone
- Steve Davis – trombone (on "Optimism")
- Joe McDonough – trombone (all tracks except "Optimism")
- James Burton – trombone
- Douglas Purviance – bass trombone
- Steve Wilson – alto, soprano sax, flute
- Todd Bashore – alto saxophone, flute, piccolo
- Ron Blake – tenor saxophone, flute
- Dan Pratt – tenor saxophone, clarinet
- Carl Maraghi – baritone saxophone, bass clarinet
- Xavier Davis – piano
- Rodney Jones – guitar (on "Gettin’ to It" and "Full House")
- Quincy Phillips – drums
- Melissa Walker – vocals (on "Upside Down" and "Mr. Bojangles")
- Brandee Younger – harp (on "In the Wee Small Hours of the Morning")
- Anna Webber – album artwork

== Chart performance ==
Chart (2017)	Peak position
US Jazz Albums (Billboard)	3
