= Convergence (Warren Wolf album) =

Studio album by Warren Wolf
- Released: June 10, 2016
- Genre: Jazz
- Length: 67:51
- Label: Mack Avenue

Convergence is an album by Warren Wolf. Featured musicians include guitarist John Scofield, pianist Brad Mehldau, bassist Christian McBride and drummer Jeff “Tain” Watts.

== Music and release ==
The final track is played by Wolf alone. The others feature Wolf with various combinations of four other musicians.

The album was released by Mack Avenue Records on June 10, 2016; it was Wolf's third album for the label.

== Reception ==
Professional ratings
Review scores
Source	Rating
Down Beat	3.5/5 stars
The Irish Times	4/5 stars
The Times	4/5 stars

The Down Beat reviewer commented that the contributions of Wolf's band were not always as strong as might be expected.

== Track listing ==
1. "Soul Sisters"
2. "Four Stars from Heaven"
3. "King of Two Fives"
4. "New Beginning"
5. "Cell Phone"
6. "Montara"
7. "Havoc"
8. "Tergiversation"
9. "Knocks Me off My Feet"
10. "A Prayer for the Christian Man"
11. "Stardust / The Minute Waltz"

== Personnel ==
- Warren Wolf – vibes, marimba, Fender Rhodes, piano
- Christian McBride – bass (tracks 1–3, 5–10)
- Jeff "Tain" Watts – drums (tracks 1, 2, 5–10)
- Brad Mehldau – piano (tracks 1, 2, 4, 5, 7)
- John Scofield – guitar (tracks 1, 7)
