= Peter Martin (jazz pianist) =

American jazz pianist (born 1970)

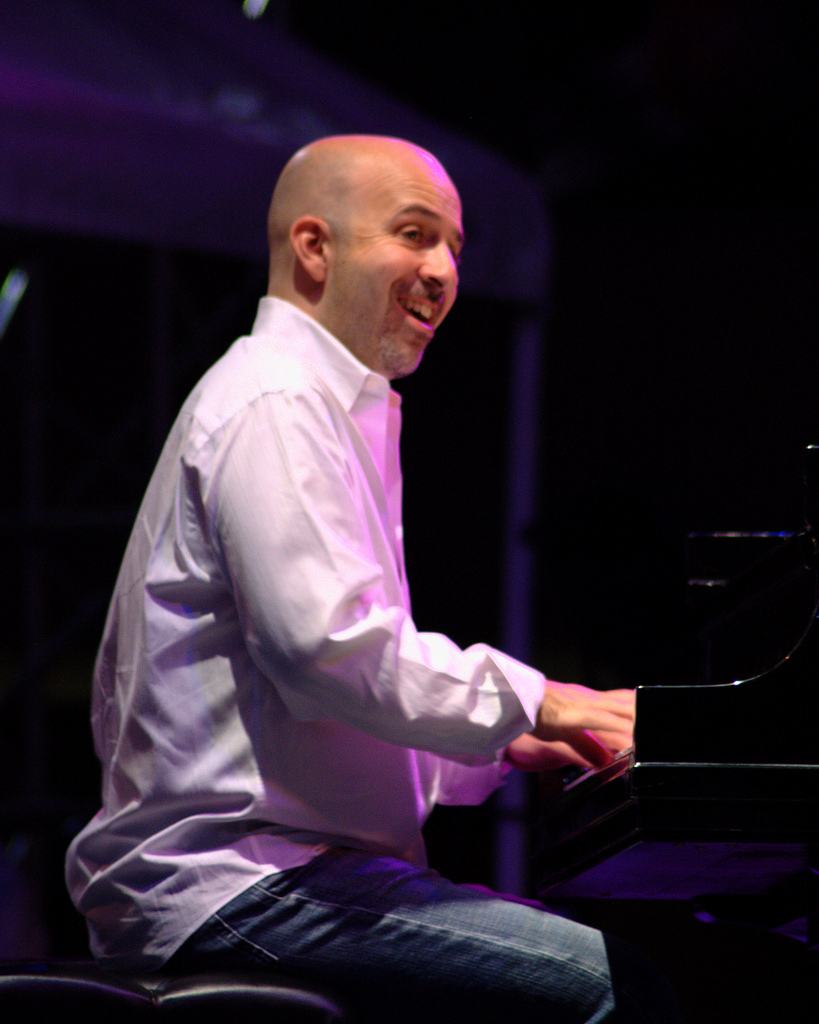
- Martin at the 30th Detroit Jazz Festival, 2009

Background information
- Born: August 17, 1970 (age 56); St. Louis, Missouri, U.S.
- Genre: Jazz
- Occupations: Musician; composer; educator; entrepreneur
- Instruments: Piano; keyboards
- Years active: 1990s–present
- Labels: King; Maxjazz; Peter Martin Music; Open Studio
- Member of: Dianne Reeves; Chris Botti; Christian McBride
- Website: petermartinmusic.com

Peter Martin (born August 17, 1970) is an American jazz pianist, composer, arranger, and educator who is best known for his work with Roy Hargrove, Christian McBride, Dianne Reeves, Wynton Marsalis, and Joshua Redman.

== Life and career ==
Martin attended the Juilliard School of Music. In 1993, he won second place in the Thelonious Monk International Jazz Piano Competition (now of the Herbie Hancock Institute of Jazz).

Producer Carl Griffin brought Martin together with saxophonist Ron Blake, bassist Rodney Whitaker, and drummer Gregory Hutchinson to form the band 4-Sight, which released one eponymous album for N2K Encoded Music in 1998.

Martin is music director and pianist for Dianne Reeves and arranged and played music for her Grammy Award–winning soundtrack to the motion picture Good Night, and Good Luck. He also appeared in the film.

In September 2008, he was appointed lecturer of jazz studies at the Jackson State University school of music. He has also been on the music faculty at Tulane University, University of New Orleans, and New Orleans Center for Creative Arts.

Martin has been a member of Chris Botti's touring band, and since 2009, tours extensively with Christian McBride as part of his quintet Inside Straight. He has recorded with Victor Goines, Johnny Griffin, Wynton Marsalis, Nicholas Payton, Joshua Redman, Dianne Reeves, and Rodney Whitaker. Other artists with whom he has performed include Terence Blanchard, Betty Carter, Ellis Marsalis, David Sanborn, and Stanley Turrentine. In January 2011, Martin played at the White House as part of the State Dinner that then-president Barack Obama held to welcome the president of China.

After launching an educational video podcast, 2-Minute Jazz, Martin launched a website, Open Studio, in 2011 that is a members-only jazz lesson site with video lessons and online masterclasses containing premium concepts and content. Students from over 120 countries have joined and are continuing to learn from Martin, Dianne Reeves, Christian McBride, Greg Hutchinson, Romero Lubambo, and other artists.

In October 2015, Martin released an album, What Lies Ahead, on Open Studio Records, featuring his trio of bassist Reuben Rogers, drummer Gregory Hutchinson, and special guests vocalists Erin Bode and Brian Owens, produced by Dan Martin. It was recorded in his hometown of St. Louis, Missouri.

In February 2018, Martin and co-host Adam Maness launched a podcast called You'll Hear It, which frequently ranks among the top 10 most popular music commentary podcasts on both Apple Music and Spotify, peaking at No. 5 in the U.S. and UK, No. 1 for Poland and Israel, No. 3 in Norway and Italy, and No. 4 in Japan. Episodes revolve around reviewing and analyzing albums and breaking down practice routines and jam sessions.

In September 2023, Martin, along with Sarah Hanahan, Gregory Hutchinson, and Reuben Rogers, recorded the album Generation S at Open Studio in one continuous take over the span of just one hour.

== Discography ==
=== As leader ===
- New Stars from New Orleans (Paddle Wheel, 1994)
- Something Unexpected (Maxjazz, 2001)
- The Answer (Peter Martin Music, 2001)
- In the P.M. (Maxjazz, 2005)
- Set of Five (Peter Martin Music, 2009)
- Parabola (King [Japan], 2010)
- What Lies Ahead (Open Studio, 2015)
- Rio Meets New Orleans (Open Studio, 2019)
- Generation S (Open Studio, 2023)

=== As sideman ===
With 4-Sight (Ron Blake, Rodney Whitaker, and Gregory Hutchinson)

- 4-Sight (N2K, 1998)

With Christian McBride & Inside Straight (Steve Wilson, Warren Wolf, Eric Reed, and Carl Allen)

- People Music (Mack Avenue, 2013)
- Live at the Village Vanguard (Mack Avenue, 2021)

With Dianne Reeves

- A Little Moonlight (Blue Note, 2003)
- Christmas Time is Here (Blue Note, 2004)
- Good Night, and Good Luck (Concord, 2005) – soundtrack
- Beautiful Life (Blue Note, 2013)

With Johnny Griffin

- Chicago, New York, Paris (Verve, 1994)

With Joshua Redman

- Spirit of the Moment – Live at the Village Vanguard (Warner Bros., 1995)
- Freedom in the Groove (Warner Bros., 1996)

New Orleans Collective

- New Orleans Collective (Evidence, 1995)

With Victor Goines

- Genesis (Rosemary Joseph, 1992)
- Love Dance (Criss Cross, 2007)

With Wynton Marsalis and the Jazz at Lincoln Center Orchestra

- All Rise (Sony Classical, 2002)
