= Conversations with Christian =

Studio album by Christian McBride
- Released: November 8, 2011
- Recorded: 2009
- Studio: Avatar (New York, New York); CRC (Chicago, Illinois); LeGonks West (Los Angeles, California); MSR (New York, New York)
- Genre: Jazz
- Length: 76:21
- Label: Mack Avenue MAC 1050
- Producer: Christian McBride

Christian McBride chronology
The Good Feeling (2011)	Conversations with Christian (2011)	People Music (2013)

Professional ratings
Review scores
Source	Rating
All About Jazz	4/5 stars
AllMusic	4.5/5 stars
The Buffalo News	3.5/4 stars
The Guardian	3/5 stars
Jazzwise	3/5 stars
Tom Hull	B+

Conversations with Christian is a studio album by American jazz bassist Christian McBride. It was released on November 8, 2011 via Mack Avenue label.

== Background ==
This is the tenth album by McBride as a leader. The album is special because it consists of 13 tracks—each recorded as a duet with various popular musicians. The project began as podcasts in 2009, when McBride started interviewing his musical companions as well as playing some compositions meanwhile. The podcast eventually led to the bassist’s popular Sirius-XM radio show, The Lowdown: Conversations With Christian.

== Reception ==
Ken Dryden of AllMusic noted "Conversations with Christian is an unusual release, as it features the veteran bassist playing duets with a number of good friends. The vocal meetings include Angélique Kidjo, Sting, and Dee Dee Bridgewater (the latter with a hilarious, funky cover of The Isley Brothers' signature song "It's Your Thing"). The pairings with musicians of McBride's generation (trumpeter Roy Hargrove, tenor saxophonist Ron Blake, and guitarist Russell Malone) all exceed expectations. There are several enjoyable duets with pianists, one featuring Latin jazz master Eddie Palmieri, a duo improvised tango by Chick Corea and the leader, plus an all too rare acoustic outing by the talented George Duke (who tears up the keyboard with his hard-charging "McDukey Blues")".

Chris Barton of Los Angeles Times stated "This year marks another active one for McBride with September's rambunctious big-band album "The Good Feeling" and this month's "Conversations With Christian," a collection of duets that rose out of a 2009 podcast series of the same name. Full of loosely intimate interplay, the results sometimes recall the try-anything spirit of McBride's guest-heavy 2006 live album "Live at Tonic". The Buffalo News review by Jeff Simon stated, "There's almost as much art on all this showing off as there is entertainment. It's a consistent delight -- though of several different kinds before it's over."

== Track listing ==
No.	Title	Writer(s)	Length
1.	"Afirika" (feat. Angélique Kidjo)	Jean Hébrail, Angélique Kidjo	4:21
2.	"Fat Bach and Greens" (feat. Regina Carter)	Johann Sebastian Bach	4:40
3.	"Consider Me Gone" (feat. Sting)	Sting	4:19
4.	"Guajeo y Tumbao" (feat. Eddie Palmieri)	Eddie Palmieri	6:18
5.	"Baubles, Bangles and Beads" (feat. Roy Hargrove)	George Forrest, Robert Wright	5:21
6.	"Spiritual" (feat. Billy Taylor)	Billy Taylor	7:07
7.	"It's Your Thing" (feat. Dee Dee Bridgewater)	O'Kelly Isley, Ronald Isley, Rudolph Isley	5:09
8.	"Alone Together" (feat. Hank Jones)	Howard Dietz, Arthur Schwartz	5:32
9.	"McDukey Blues" (feat. George Duke)	Christian McBride	5:34
10.	"Tango Improvisation #1" (feat. Chick Corea)	Chick Corea, Christian McBride	9:06
11.	"Sister Rosa" (feat. Russell Malone)	Christian McBride	6:39
12.	"Shake 'n Blake" (feat. Ron Blake)	Christian McBride	5:36
13.	"Chitlins and Gefiltefish" (feat. Gina Gershon)	Christian McBride	6:39
Total length:			76:21

== Personnel ==
Band

- Christian McBride – primary artist, double bass, producer

Production

- Randall Kennedy – creative director
- André Kimo Stone Guess – associate producer
- Mat Lejeune – engineer
- Fernando Lodeiro – assistant engineer

== Chart performance ==
Chart (2011)	Peak position
US Jazz Albums (Billboard)	23
