= Christian McBride Big Band =

American jazz ensemble

The Christian McBride Big Band is a 17-piece big band whose debut album The Good Feeling received the Grammy Award for Best Large Jazz Ensemble Album in 2012. For the 2026 Grammy Awards, they received a nomination for their album Without Further Ado, Vol. 1 in the Best Large Jazz Ensemble Album category.

== Background ==
The group, along with the Roy Hargrove Big Band and the Mingus Big Band have swung the pendulum back that pulled small ensemble African-American Jazz into white mainstream popular music during what was dubbed the "Big Band Era" or Swing Era of the mid-1930s to the late mid-1940s, creating a new big-band sound that fuses traditional Big Band long-form compositions with more modern post-Bop sound.

The band has performed at clubs in New York, where most of the musicians are based, and at major festivals like the Playboy Jazz Festival in Los Angeles or the James Moody Festival in Newark.

== Personnel ==
The Christian McBride Big Band is composed of:

- Christian McBride (leader/bass)
- Steve Wilson (alto saxophone, flute))
- Todd Bashore (alto saxophone, flute)
- Ron Blake (tenor saxophone, soprano saxophone, flute)
- Todd Williams (tenor saxophone, flute)
- Loren Schoenberg (tenor saxophone (Tracks 2, 8))
- Carl Maraghi (baritone saxophone, bass clarinet)
- Frank Greene (trumpet)
- Freddie Hendrix (trumpet)
- Nicholas Payton (trumpet)
- Nabati Isles (trumpet)
- Brandon Lee (trumpet)
- Steve Davis (trombone)
- Michael Dease (trombone)
- James Burton (trombone)
- Douglas Purviance (bass trombone)
- Xavier Davis (piano)
- Rodney Jones (guitar)
- Ulysses Owens Jr. (drums)
- Melissa Walker (vocals)

== Discography ==
- The Good Feeling, (Mack Avenue), 2011. Grammy Award - Best Large Jazz Ensemble Album, 2012,
- Bringin' It, (Mack Avenue), 2017. Grammy Award - Best Large Jazz Ensemble Album, 2018,
- For Jimmy, Wes and Oliver, (Mack Avenue), 2020. Grammy Award for Best Large Jazz Ensemble Album, 2022
- Without Further Ado, Vol 1, (Mack Avenue), 2025. Grammy Award for Best Large Jazz Ensemble Album, 2026

== Resources ==
- Christian McBride Big Band - AllMusic.com - Discography
