= But Who's Gonna Play the Melody? =

Studio album by Christian McBride, Edgar Meyer
- Released: March 22, 2024
- Recorded: 2019–2022
- Studios: Ingram Hall, Blair School of Music, Vanderbilt University
- Genres: Bluegrass, jazz-funk, new acoustic, post-bop
- Length: 66:08
- Label: Mack Avenue
- Producer: Edgar Meyer

Christian McBride chronology
Prime (2023)	But Who's Gonna Play the Melody? (2024)	Without Further Ado, Vol 1 (2025)

Edgar Meyer chronology
Not Our First Goat Rodeo (2020)	But Who's Gonna Play the Melody? (2024)

Professional ratings
Review scores
Source	Rating
All About Jazz	4/5 stars
AllMusic	4/5 stars
Tom Hull	B+

But Who's Gonna Play the Melody? is a studio album by American jazz bassists Christian McBride and composer Edgar Meyer. The album was released on by 22 March 2024 via Mack Avenue.

== Background ==
McBride explained: "Edgar and I come from two different places... I come from the jazz and R&B worlds with a little bit of classical, and he comes from the bluegrass and classical worlds with a little bit of jazz. With this album we're meeting each other in uncharted territory."

The album contains original tracks written by bandmembers as well as several strandards. Each musician also plays piano on two different tracks, meaning that four out of fifteen have piano/bass duets.

== Reception ==
Matt Collar of AllMusic stated, "While both McBride and Meyer are acclaimed in their own right and largely considered two of the best, if not the best bassists of their generation, they come to improvisational music from slightly different perspectives. A jazz star from a young age, McBride is steeped in the acoustic post-bop, R&B, and funk traditions with a strong classical technique underpinning his work. Conversely, Meyer, who teaches at Vanderbilt University in Nashville, is largely known for playing classical and progressive bluegrass music with a strong harmonic and improvisational jazz sensibility informing his work." Mike Jurkovic of All About Jazz commented, "It is not known exactly how many duets of this nature have fallen into the lackluster bin of audio history. But rest assured that But Who's Gonna Play The Melody? is as far from that incalculable number as the moon is from the sun." Ian Lomax of the Jazz Journal added, "Two bass virtuosi confound expectation and sustain interest through a set covering the GAS, some bebop and some classical".

== Track listing ==
No.	Title	Writer(s)	Length
1.	"Green Slime"	Meyer	5:55
2.	"Barnyard Disturbance"	Meyer	4:43
3.	"Bebop, of Course"	McBride	3:29
4.	"Bass Duo #1"	McBride	5:15
5.	"Solar"	Miles Davis	3:59
6.	"Canon"	Meyer	3:25
7.	"Philly Slop"	McBride	3:25
8.	"Interlude #1"	Meyer	1:54
9.	"FRB 2DB"	Meyer	4:18
10.	"Bewitched, Bothered and Bewildered"	Lorenz Hart, Richard Rodgers	5:59
11.	"Bass Duo #2"	Meyer	6:08
12.	"Lullaby for a Ladybug"	McBride	5:06
13.	"Days of Wine and Roses"	Henry Mancini	5:34
14.	"Interlude #2"	Meyer	1:45
15.	"Tennessee Blues"	Bill Monroe	4:02
Total length:			66:08

== Personnel ==
- Christian McBride – acoustic bass, piano
- Edgar Meyer – acoustic bass, piano, production
