= Christian McBride's New Jawn =

Studio album by Christian McBride
- Released: October 26, 2018
- Recorded: May 25–27, 2017
- Studio: Jazz St. Louis MO: Sear Sound, New York City
- Genre: Jazz
- Length: 57:38
- Label: Mack Avenue MAC1133
- Producer: Christian McBride

Christian McBride chronology
Bringin' It (2017)	Christian McBride's New Jawn (2018)	The Movement Revisited (2020)

Christian McBride's New Jawn is a studio album by American jazz bassist Christian McBride recorded together with saxophonist Marcus Strickland, trumpeter Josh Evans, and drummer Nasheet Waits. The album was released on October 26, 2018 via Mack Avenue label. Eight of the 9 songs included in the album are originals written by bandmembers; one composition is written by Wayne Shorter. The band released the follow-up album Prime in 2023.

== Reception ==
Professional ratings
Review scores
Source	Rating
All About Jazz	4.5/5 stars
AllMusic	4/5 stars
The Buffalo News	4/4 stars
DownBeat	4/5 stars
Jazz Journal	3/5 stars
Jazzwise	4/5 stars
Le Devoir	4/5 stars
PopMatters	7/10
The Times	3/5 stars
Tom Hull	B+

Maureen Malloy of WRTI stated "For those who don’t know, 'jawn' is Philly slang for a person, place or thing... The sound is unique due to the absence of a pianist, which makes it even more like Philly – gritty and daring, and maybe a bit brash". Hillary Brown of DownBeat commented "No doubt, the Philly flavor is present—tight instrumentation, fast-and-loose percussive subtlety and soul for days... A proper captain, McBride always brings the swing full-circle..." A reviewer of Bass Player added "Call something a "jawn" in Philly, and everyone will know that whatever you're talking about has a certain hip cachet, a heavy dose of soul, and a generous helping of what in the City of Brotherly Love is known as "atty-tood." Christian McBride's New Jawn has all of that and more!" JazzTimes's Dan Bilawsky commented "What starts out looking like a complete departure of form for this bassist of note turns out to be something else entirely: the continuation of one man’s grand creative journey and a ready acknowledgement of possibility in motion."

== Track listing ==
No.	Title	Writer(s)	Length
1.	"Walkin' Funny"	McBride	2:49
2.	"Ke-Kelli Sketch"	Waits	9:54
3.	"Ballad of Ernie Washington"	Evans	5:34
4.	"The Middle Man"	Strickland	5:00
5.	"Pier One Import"	Evans	7:44
6.	"Kush"	Waits	5:35
7.	"Seek the Source"	Strickland	7:21
8.	"John Day"	McBride	5:19
9.	"Sightseeing"	Wayne Shorter	8:30
Total length:			57:38

== Personnel ==
- Christian McBride – bass, producer
- Josh Evans – trumpet
- Marcus Strickland – tenor saxophone, bass clarinet
- Nasheet Waits – drums
- Todd Whitelock – associate producer

== Chart performance ==
Chart (2018)	Peak position
US Jazz Albums (Billboard)	13
