= Xavier Davis =

American jazz musician

- Xavier Davis playing piano, 2014

Background information
- Born: 1971 (age 54–55); Grand Rapids, Michigan
- Genre: Jazz
- Instrument: Piano

Xavier Davis (born 1971 in Grand Rapids, Michigan) is an American jazz pianist, composer, arranger, producer, and music educator who leads the Xavier Davis Trio. In addition to performing with the Christian McBride Big Band and other groups as a side man. In 2014 he was appointed Associate Professor of Jazz Piano at Michigan State University. He previously taught at the Juilliard Jazz program at the Juilliard School for six years. He performed on two Grammy-winning albums The Good Feeling, and Bringin' It with the Christian McBride Big Band. Davis was the musical director for the Boys Choir of Harlem for the 1999–2000 season. He appeared on the television series Cosby as a pianist.

== Biography ==
While performing with his college ensemble at the 1994 International Association of Jazz Educators convention in Boston, vocalist Betty Carter caught his performance and took him to New York to work with her trio. Davis recognizes former Juilliard Jazz faculty chair and drummer Carl Allen, James Williams, and Billy Hart as mentors.

== Discography ==
=== As leader ===
Year recorded	Title	Label	Notes
1999?	Dance of Life		Quartet, with Don Braden (tenor sax), Dwayne Burno (bass), Carl Allen (drums)
2001	Innocence of Youth	Fresh Sound New Talent	Trio, with Brandon Owens (bass), E. J. Strickland (drums)

=== As sideman ===
Davis has recorded as a sideman for:

- Betty Carter
- Freddie Hubbard
- Tom Harrell
- Christian McBride
- Regina Carter
- Stefon Harris
- Abbey Lincoln
- Wynton Marsalis
- Don Byron
- Nat Adderley
- Nicholas Payton
- Jon Faddis
- Jimmy Greene
- Steve Turre, Keep Searchin' (HighNote, 2006)
- Al Foster
- Jeremy Pelt
- Dion Parson
- Ron Blake
