= J.D. Steele =

American choir director and singer

- Occupations: Singer; songwriter
- Years active: 1977–present
- Musical career
- Genres: R&B; soul; gospel

J.D. Steele is an American singer, songwriter, arranger and choir director best known for his work with Prince, as the J.D. Steele Singers in "The Gospel at Colonus", in musical theatre, and as a member of the vocal group The Steeles.

== Early life and education ==
Steele was born in Gary, Indiana, the son of Sallie Steele Birdsong. He attended Purdue University. Steele moved to Minneapolis in 1976.

== Career ==
=== Prince ===
In 1977, Steele met Prince Rogers Nelson in Minneapolis where he watched Prince in basement rehearsals and early shows. Prince brought Steele with his siblings into the studio to accompany Mavis Staples on the track "Melody Cool" on his Graffiti Bridge album, released in 1990. As The Steeles, they recorded background vocals on "Still Would Stand All Time" and "Thieves In The Temple" and appeared in the film of the same name.

In 1993, The Steeles opened for Prince on tour. Prince wrote the song "Well Done" for The Steeles debut album Heaven Help Us All released in 1993 by Elektra Records. J.D. worked with Prince on the recording sessions at Paisley Park Studios in Chanhassen, Minnesota.

In 1994, Super Hero by New Power Generation featuring The Steeles was recorded at Paisley Park Studios from May to June for the Blankman soundtrack album and released on August 9, 1994.

=== The Gospel at Colonus and musical theatre ===
Steele was the choir director of the original production of The Gospel at Colonus in 1983, the Broadway production in 1988, and continuing on touring productions with Bob Telson, where they visit local choirs in the African-American community inviting them to join the show.

In 2022, Steele composed the music and directed a community choir for Iphigenia.

=== The Steeles ===
In 1993, as a vocal group with his siblings, The Steeles released their debut album Heaven Help Us All on Elektra Records. He produced and co-wrote 12 of the songs. In 2003 they followed with We Worship You, Two Queens, One Castle, It's Christmas, and Better Love in 1997. With The Steeles, J.D. recorded background vocals for artists including Prince, Donald Fagen, George Clinton, Mavis Staples, Kim Carnes, Fine Young Cannibals, and The Sounds of Blackness.

=== The Movement Revisited and Listen! Please! ===
Steele worked with Christian McBride as the choral director and arranger for The Movement Revisited. In 2021, Steele directed the short documentary Listen! Please! on racism.
