= Damn! (Jimmy Smith album) =

1995 album by Jimmy Smith

Studio album by Jimmy Smith
- Released: 1995
- Recorded: January 24–25, 1995
- Genre: Jazz
- Length: 62:48
- Label: Verve
- Producers: Richard Seidel; Don Sickler

Jimmy Smith chronology
Sum Serious Blues' (1993)	Damn! (1995)	Angel Eyes: Ballads & Slow Jams (1996)

Damn! is a 1996 album by the American jazz organist Jimmy Smith. The album was Smith's first album for Verve Records for over twenty years.

Damn! peaked at number 13 on the Billboard Top Jazz Album charts.

It's the last recording session of the drummer Art Taylor, a few weeks before his death.

== Reception ==
Professional ratings
Review scores
Source	Rating
AllMusic	4/5 stars

The AllMusic review by Steve Leggett awarded the album four stars with Leggett writing that "The whole album, start to finish, works a wonderful groove, but versions here of James Brown's "Papa's Got a Brand New Bag," Herbie Hancock's "Watermelon Man," and Charlie Parker's "Scrapple from the Apple" are particularly strong..Damn! is right up there with his best work, full of a joyous energy, and it sparked a resurgence of sorts for Smith."

== Track listing ==
1. "Papa's Got a Brand New Bag" (James Brown) – 7:30
2. "Sister Sadie" (Horace Silver) – 6:57
3. "Woody 'n' You" (Dizzy Gillespie) – 6:50
4. "The One Before This" (Gene Ammons) – 6:53
5. "Watermelon Man" (Herbie Hancock) – 8:43
6. "Dat Dere" (Bobby Timmons) – 7:30
7. "Scrapple from the Apple" (Charlie Parker) – 5:25
8. "Hi-Fly" (Randy Weston) – 6:35
9. "A L Mode" (Curtis Fuller) – 6:25

== Personnel ==
Musicians

- Jimmy Smith – organ, arranger
- Roy Hargrove – flugelhorn, trumpet
- Nicholas Payton – trumpet
- Abraham Burton – alto saxophone
- Mark Whitfield – guitar
- Christian McBride – double bass
- Bernard "Pretty" Purdie – drums
- Art Taylor – drums
- Tim Warfield – tenor saxophone (tracks 2, 4–5, 9)
- Ron Blake – tenor saxophone (tracks 4–5, 9),
- Mark Turner – tenor saxophone (track 2)

Production

- Jim Anderson – engineer, mixing
- Lola Smith – executive producer
- Allan Tucker – mastering
- Chris Albert – mixing assistant
- Jimmy Katz – photography
- Camille Tominaro – production coordination
- David Lau – art direction, design
- Rudi Mallasch – assistant coordinator
- Scott Austin – assistant engineer
- Nate Herr – coordination
- Richard Seidel – producer
- Don Sickler
