= Prime (album) =

Studio album by Christian McBride
- Released: February 24, 2023
- Recorded: December 16–17, 2021
- Studio: Power Station, NYC
- Genre: Jazz
- Length: 54:28
- Label: Mack Avenue
- Producer: Christian McBride, Romelle Canonizado

Christian McBride chronology
Live at the Village Vanguard (2021)	Prime (2023)	But Who's Gonna Play the Melody? (2024)

Professional ratings
Review scores
Source	Rating
All About Jazz	4/5 stars
AllMusic	4.5/5 stars
The Denver Post	3/4 stars
Jazzwise	4/5 stars
Tom Hull	A−

Prime is a studio album by American jazz bassist Christian McBride recorded together with saxophonist Marcus Strickland, trumpeter Josh Evans, and drummer Nasheet Waits. The album was released on 24 February 2023 via Mack Avenue label.

== Background ==
For McBride, this is the 18th album as a band leader and the second one for his band New Jawn after Christian McBride's New Jawn released in 2018. Prime contains eight tracks: five originals written by bandmembers and three jazz standards.

McBride explained, "So, we recorded this at the end of 2021, I believe. We were fresh off of the gig at the Vanguard, so a lot of the stuff that we recorded were things that we had worked on that week. It wasn't really that difficult to figure out what the material was going to be. I think putting a recording together is not that dissimilar to putting a set together. You want to make sure you start off with something exciting — something that's going to lock the people in as best as you think you can, and then you just try to shape it so it's a good listening experience."

== Reception ==
Kevin Le Gendre of Jazzwise wrote, "Trumpeter Josh Evans and saxophonist Marcus Strickland form an excellent horn section, stoking a freeish fire on occasion but the latter's bass clarinet ostinatos make a big impact insofar as they lend more heft to the low register as well as enriching the harmonic palette. Although largely perceived as a straight ahead champion, McBride has always been pleasingly eclectic, and his absorption of the avant-garde flourishes of Mingus, Max and Dolphy leads him down long, winding, interesting roads here." Mike Jurkovic of All About Jazz noted, "With trigger quick wit and telepathy Prime's flagship track develops into a full-on, fun-house jam as the delightfully chord-less quintet run roughshod over this and all of Prime's eight master class tracks." Michael Major of Broadway World commented, "Prime exemplifies jazz greats at the zenith of their powers who insist on scaling greater heights." Ian Lomax of Jazz Journal added, "New Jawn may be a step too far for many, but there is no doubting the innovation, the talent, and the passion. This is album is certainly worth a listen for all McBride fans and the musically adventurous."

== Track listing ==
No.	Title	Writer(s)	Length
1.	"Head Bedlam"	Christian McBride	5:46
2.	"Prime"	Marcus Strickland	7:29
3.	"Moonchild"	Nasheet Waits	4:44
4.	"Obsequious"	Larry Young	8:05
5.	"Lurkers"	Christian McBride	8:48
6.	"The Good Life"	Ornette Coleman	7:35
7.	"Dolphy Dust"	Josh Evans	5:03
8.	"East Broadway Run Down"	Sonny Rollins	7:17
Total length:			54:28

== Personnel ==
- Christian McBride – bass, production
- Josh Evans – trumpet
- Marcus Strickland – tenor saxophone, bass clarinet
- Nasheet Waits – drums
