= People Music =

Studio album by Christian McBride
- Released: May 14, 2013
- Studio: Avatar (New York, New York)
- Genre: Jazz
- Length: 55:40
- Label: Mack Avenue MAC1070
- Producer: Christian McBride

Christian McBride chronology
Conversations with Christian (2011)	People Music (2013)	Out Here (2013)

Professional ratings
Review scores
Source	Rating
All About Jazz	5/5 stars
AllMusic	3.5/5 stars
Jazzwise	3/5 stars
PopMatters	7/10
Tom Hull	B+

People Music is a studio album by jazz bassist Christian McBride together with his band Inside Straight. The record was released on May 14, 2013 via the Mack Avenue label.

== Background ==
People Music is the second album for McBride's band Inside Straight. The album comes nearly four years after the band's debut record, Kind of Brown. The present album features eight original compositions, four of which were written by McBride. His originals include the composition “New Hope’s Angel” written when Whitney Houston died. The core group performed six tracks; the other two pieces were recorded by a slightly different lineup.

== Reception ==
Jeff Tamarkin of Jazz Times noted "Following a one-off big-band outing, this is his second with Inside Straight, the acoustic quintet he formed in 2009. Like that year’s Kind of Brown, People Music feels like a mental reboot, an opportunity for McBride to call the shots on his own terms with some handpicked compadres".

Corey Brown of Notreble said "The new album finds the quintet in hard-swing mode, delivering what they call “more road-tested, ‘lived-in’ Inside Straight” in an accessible way, and one that makes the audience part of the experience."

== Track listing ==
No.	Title	Writer(s)	Length
1.	"Listen to the Heroes Cry"	McBride	7:38
2.	"Fair Hope Theme"	McBride	6:49
3.	"Gang Gang"	Warren Wolf	7:03
4.	"Ms. Angelou"	Steve Wilson	6:41
5.	"The Movement, Revisited"	McBride	8:29
6.	"Unusual Suspects"	Peter Martin	7:28
7.	"Dream Train"	Sands	6:04
8.	"New Hope's Angel"	McBride	5:28
Total length:			55:40

== Personnel ==
Band

- Christian McBride – bass
- Carl Allen – drums (2–6, 8)
- Peter Martin – piano (2–6, 8)
- Ulysses Owens – drums (1, 7)
- Christian Sands – piano (1, 7)
- Warren Wolf – vibraphone
- Steve Wilson – saxophones

Production

- Keith H. Brown – illustrations
- Joe Ferla – engineer
- Randall Kennedy – creative director
- Chi Modu – photography
- Raj Naik – art direction, design
- Al Pryor – A&R
- Mark Wilder – mastering

== Chart performance ==
Chart (2013)	Peak position
US Jazz Albums (Billboard)	26
