= Vertical Vision =

Studio album by Christian McBride
- Released: February 11, 2003
- Recorded: June 14–16, 2002
- Studio: Right Track Recording, New York City
- Genre: Jazz
- Length: 48:53
- Label: Warner Bros. Records 9362-48278-2
- Producer: Christian McBride

Christian McBride chronology
The Philadelphia Experiment (2001)	Vertical Vision (2003)	Live at Tonic (2006)

Professional ratings
Review scores
Source	Rating
AllMusic	4/5 stars
Jazz Review	3/5 stars
The Encyclopedia of Popular Music	3/5 stars
The Penguin Guide to Jazz Recordings	3/4 stars

Vertical Vision is an album by bassist Christian McBride's sextet that was released in 2003 by Warner Bros. Records. This album was his only release on that record label.

== Reception ==
Christian McBride of Jazz Review stated "For several years now, bassist Christian McBride has been dead set on proving true the old axiom that not only does jazz have the ability to broaden the scope and depth of popular music, but that the latter can also rejuvenate and invigorate the former when it hits a rut... But this is precisely what McBride has offered forth on Vertical Vision, his debut for Warner Brothers. The tongue in cheek opener, "Circa 1990" (a scratchy, 16-second snippet of a retro-swing tune) points up the bassist's stern-faced dedication to this new direction, in sharp response to the snobbish responses to 1998's A Family Affair and 2000's Sci-Fi (his earlier similar departures, both on Verve). From that moment on, for fifty solid minutes, McBride is committed to an aesthetic every bit as reconstructionist and conservative as his neo-bop days - the difference being that here he substitutes Jaco-like fretless work for his Ray Brown-style walking, a variety of keyboards for plain piano, and modern break beats for reliance on the ride cymbal".

Paula Edelstein of AllMusic wrote "The celebrated jazz educator, master bassist, composer, and arranger, Christian McBride provides a new recording, told in a language of blazing originality. Vertical Vision is a multi-layered musical story that features beautiful solos, great grooves, funky riffs, and virtuosic performances by each bandmember. The recording also reveals McBride's passion for strong writing, brilliant accompaniment, and eclectic melodic voicings that stay with listeners long after the record ends".

== Track listing ==
No.	Title	Writer(s)	Length
1.	"Circa 1990"	McBride	0:16
2.	"Technicolor Nightmare"	McBride	8:26
3.	"Tahitian Pearl"	Geoffery Keezer	6:26
4.	"The Wizard of Montara"	McBride	3:40
5.	"The Ballad of Little Girl Dancer"	McBride	5:38
6.	"Lejos de Usted"	McBride	4:52
7.	"Precious One"	Geoffrey Keezer	5:54
8.	"Song for Maya"	Ron Blake	4:08
9.	"Boogie Woogie Waltz"	Joe Zawinul	9:09
Total length:			48:53

== Personnel ==
Band

- Christian McBride – bass (upright, electric), production
- Ron Blake – saxophone (tenor, soprano), flute
- Geoffrey Keezer – piano, keyboards
- Terreon Gully – drums
- David Gilmore – guitar (acoustic, electric)
- Danny Sadownick – percussion

Production

- Joe Ferla – recording, mixing

== Chart performance ==
Chart (2003)	Peak position
US Jazz Albums (Billboard)	39
