= Terreon Gully =

American drummer

- Born: Terreon Deautri Gully; December 28, 1972 (age 53); East St. Louis, Illinois, U.S.
- Genres: Jazz, avant garde jazz
- Occupation: Musician
- Instrument: Drums
- Years active: 1996–present
- Website: www.terreongully.com

Terreon Deautri Gully (born December 28, 1972) is an American drummer from East St. Louis, Illinois.

== Career ==
Gully has performed with various musicians and genres, including the Christian McBride Band, saxophonist Ron Blake, vibraphonist Stefon Harris and Latin band Yerba Buena.

Gully was the Professor of Drumset at University of Manitoba in Winnipeg, Manitoba, Canada from 2008 until 2010.

== Discography ==
- 2020 − Michael Olatuja: Lagos Pepper Soup
- 2006 − Christian McBride: Live at Tonic
- 2004 − The New Sound Quartet: Summer Knows
- 2003 − Christian McBride: Vertical Vision
- 2001 – Jacky Terrasson & Stefon Harris: Kindred
- 2000 – Jacky Terrasson: A Paris...
