= Anna Webber (photographer) =

American photographer (born 1986)

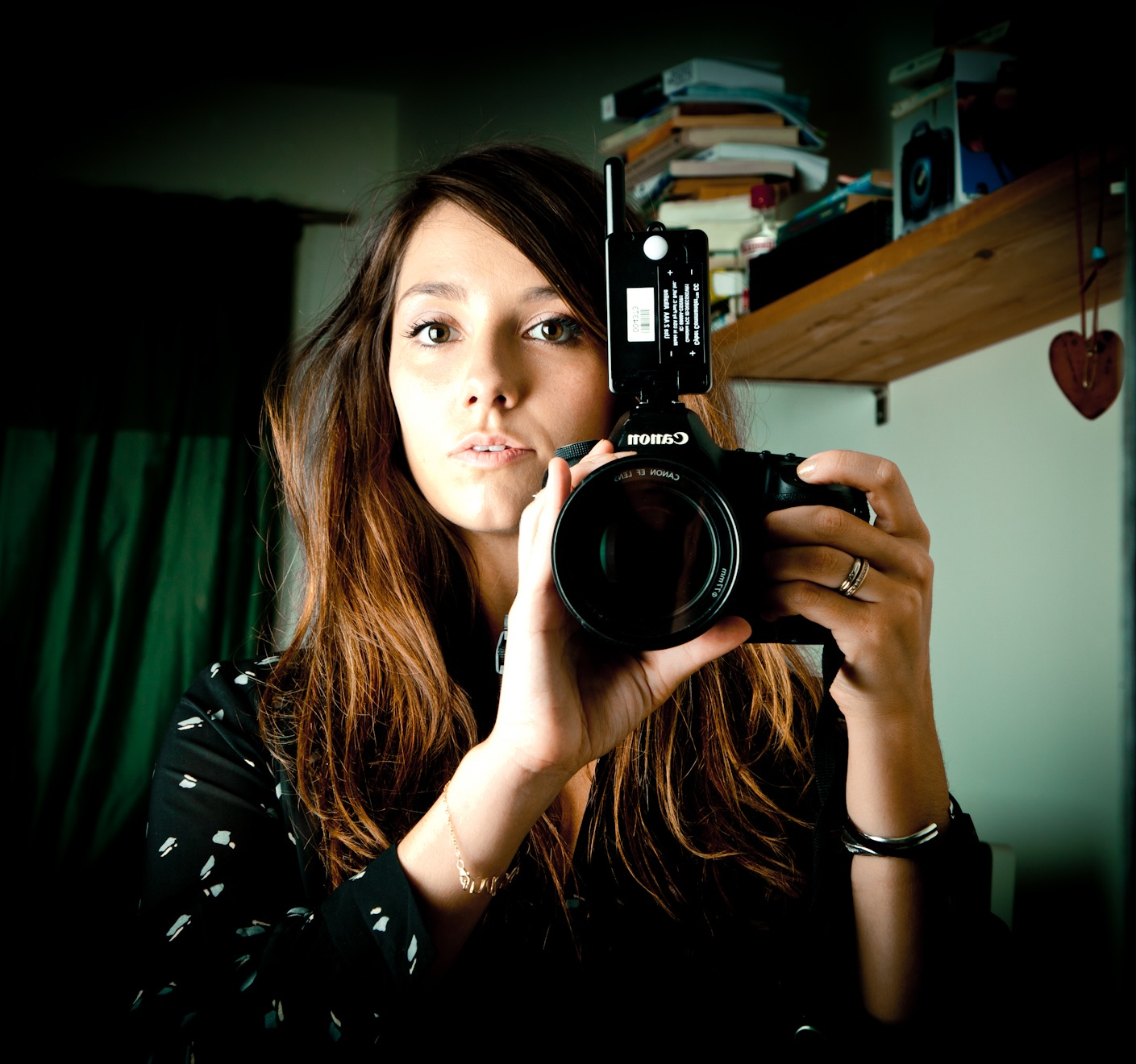
- Webber in 2011
- Born: August 28, 1986 (age 39); Woodland Hills, California, U.S.
- Occupation: Photographer
- Years active: 2004–present

Anna Webber (born August 28, 1986) is an American photographer best known for her musician portrait photography, in addition to being an official ambassador for The Multiple Sclerosis Association of America (MSSA). Her work has appeared in Rolling Stone, Spin, People, and Billboard.

== Career ==
Webber studied in Florence, Italy in 2005, under Jill Furmanovsky, the British rock photographer best known for her photos of Pink Floyd, Bob Dylan, Blondie, Led Zeppelin, The Clash, and others on display in the National Portrait Gallery in London, England.

In 2007, Webber was an apprentice to Baron Wolman, rock and roll photographer and the first chief-photographer for Rolling Stone magazine. They met at one of Wolman's exhibits in Los Angeles, California, and he quickly became her mentor. Wolman noticed a special quality in her photographs.

He was quoted as saying, "She gets the musicians to work with her – that is really the most important part. They cooperate with her and you can see how relaxed they are in the photos. Unlike most photographers, Anna knows music. That's a real asset."

She graduated from Pepperdine University in 2008 with a double major in creative writing and business.

Webber mastered the digital darkroom in the James Hickey fashion photography and lighting studio.

Currently, Webber is a top music industry photographer. Her portrait work has appeared in Rolling Stone, Spin, People, and Billboard. Some of her more famous works include portraits of Willie Nelson, Beck, Philip Glass, and Cheech & Chong. She has also created publicity and album cover photography for Sony, EMI, and numerous other record labels. She has been in demand as a regular photo correspondent in New York and Los Angeles with worldwide photo agency Getty Images since 2008.

Webber has shot several album covers for Mack Avenue Records.

As a music journalist, Webber was a regular contributor to LA Weekly from 2008 to 2010, writing live concert reviews and the occasional think piece, as well as shooting live concerts. Of particular note was her personal reminiscence about the photographer Jim Marshall upon his death in 2010.

== Multiple Sclerosis Association of America Ambassador ==
In July 2009, Webber was diagnosed with multiple sclerosis, after months of intensive testing. In the fall of 2011, she was recognized by the Multiple Sclerosis Association of America (MSAA), for her ability to overcome the complications of her illness while still fully active and able to function at 100%. She was then named a national ambassador for MSAA, and she is directly involved in several campaigns to inspire and help enable others with MS to achieve at levels they might otherwise not think possible.

Webber also works with the nonprofit organization Elizabeth's Canvas, which supplies cancer patients and survivors with the art supplies, classes, and support groups they need to better cope with their symptoms, improve their well-being, and live an empowered life.

== Music background ==
At 17, she studied percussion under Walfredo Reyes, Jr., former drummer of Santana and current drummer of Chicago, as well as with her father, Kevin Webber, longtime percussionist and trained cinematographer.

Anna is also part of the Austin, Texas-based company Webber Design Creative Family.
