= Sci-Fi (album) =

Studio album by Christian McBride
- Released: September 11, 2000
- Recorded: February 10–12, 2000
- Studio: Avatar (New York, New York)
- Genre: Jazz
- Length: 71:40
- Label: Verve
- Producer: Christian McBride

Christian McBride chronology
A Family Affair (1998)	Sci-Fi (2000)	The Philadelphia Experiment (2001)

Professional ratings
Review scores
Source	Rating
AllMusic	4/5 stars
The Encyclopedia of Popular Music	3/5 stars
Entertainment Weekly	B
The Guardian	4/5 stars
The Penguin Guide to Jazz Recordings	3/4 stars

Sci-Fi is the fourth studio album by jazz bassist Christian McBride, released in 2000 by Verve. Some of the tracks are pop standards.

== Reception ==
John Fordham of The Guardian wrote "Sci-Fi starts unpromisingly, with a rather anonymous, swoony, mixed-tempo account of Steely Dan's 1977 hit Aja that only ignites with David Gilmore's guitar solo. Yet, as it continues, US bass star McBride's typically broad-minded set emphasises both his own playing gifts and their pulling-power with some of the biggest names in the business. McBride's clarity of sound, the bullet-like impact he imparts to every note at any speed, and the distinctive turns of his lines, make him one of the most remarkable bassists in post-bop. The impact those virtues have on other players often leave you feeling that the improvisations on his albums could just be clipped out and segued into each other, with the themes dropped on the floor".

John Murph of Jazz Times stated "As the title suggests, the album has a questing quality that’s sometimes expressed in the longing melodies of Ron Blake’s tenor saxophone on “Aja,” Dianne Reeves’ celestial vocalese on “Lullaby for a Ladybug” or drummer Rodney Green's rocketing rhythmic bursts on “Xerxes.” McBride's robust acoustic bass alone could propel any ensemble to the stratosphere, but on Sci-Fi he adds even more ammunition to his arsenal: he plays discreet Fender Rhodes as a complement to Shedrick Mitchell's acoustic piano. On the Wayne Shorterish title track, McBride tosses in some spacey keyboard effects, while Blake's adventurous soprano saxophone probes right through the spacious composition, like the Enterprise warping through galactic wormholes. McBride pays tribute to two of his electric-bass heroes, Jaco Pastorius and Stanley Clarke, with “Havona” and “Butterfly Dreams,” respectively, and gives a mighty pound to the ’70s fusion with the infectious “Via Mwandishi,” which features James Carter's bass clarinet recalling Bennie Maupin, one of the instrument's underrated players."

== Track listing ==
No.	Title	Writer(s)	Length
1.	"Aja"	Walter Becker, Donald Fagen	6:46
2.	"Uhura's Moment Returned"	McBride	6:18
3.	"Xerxes"	McBride	7:56
4.	"Lullaby for a Ladybug"	McBride	7:28
5.	"Science Fiction"	McBride	6:50
6.	"Walking on the Moon"	Sting	6:43
7.	"Havona"	Jaco Pastorius	7:12
8.	"I Guess I'll Have to Forget"	McBride	6:10
9.	"Butterfly Dreams"	Stanley Clarke	6:43
10.	"Via Mwandishi"	McBride	8:02
11.	"The Sci-fi Outro"	McBride	1:13
Total length:			71:40

== Personnel ==
Band

- Christian McBride – bass (upright, electric), keyboards, production
- Ron Blake – sax (tenor, soprano)
- Shedrick Mitchell – piano, electric piano
- Rodney Green – drums
- Herbie Hancock – piano (on "Xerxes" and "Lullaby for a Ladybug")
- Dianne Reeves – vocalese (on "Lullaby for a Ladybug")
- Toots Thielemans – harmonica
- James Carter – bass clarinet
- David Gilmore – guitar (acoustic, electric)

Production

- Joe Ferla – recording, mixing

== Chart performance ==
Chart (2000)	Peak position
US Jazz Albums (Billboard)	25
