= Emperor March: Live at the Blue Note =

Live album by Charles Tolliver Big Band
- Released: 2009
- Recorded: July 10–11, 2008
- Venue: Blue Note Jazz Club, New York City
- Genre: Jazz
- Label: Half Note; 4539
- Producer: Charles Tolliver, Jeff Levenson

Charles Tolliver chronology
With Love (2006)	Emperor March: Live at the Blue Note (2009)	Connect (2020)

Emperor March: Live at the Blue Note is a live album by the Charles Tolliver Big Band, led by trumpeter and composer Charles Tolliver. It was recorded on July 10 and 11, 2008, at the Blue Note Jazz Club in New York City, and was issued in 2009 by Half Note Records, Tolliver's first release as a leader for the label.

== Reception ==
Professional ratings
Review scores
Source	Rating
All About Jazz	4/5 stars
AllMusic	4.5/5 stars
Tom Hull – on the Web	B+

In a review for AllMusic, Ken Dryden called the album "a potent follow-up" to Tolliver's previous release, With Love, and wrote: "Beautifully recorded and mixed with an attentive audience, this is an essential release for modern big-band aficionados."

Troy Collins of All About Jazz stated: "Tolliver's multi-generational band burns with a fervor typical of younger groups. Incorporating an exhilarating mix of interlocking layers, sudden tempo shifts, and dramatic mood changes, this veteran ensemble negotiates Tolliver's cantilevered charts with the graceful fluidity of a unit a fraction its size."

NPR Music's Kevin Whitehead commented: "Tolliver's mass trumpet, saxes and trombones call out to each other like friendly rivals who are on the same side... [the album] shows why a few idealists continue to mount these high overhead, lucky if we break even ensembles of a dozen and a half players."

Writer Doug Ramsey remarked: "Tolliver melds new departures with traditional values that include dynamite writing for brass. His solos and those by veterans Stanley Cowell, piano, and Billy Harper, tenor saxophone, are superb... The first and final passages of Tolliver's title tune... has riff-like qualities that could embed it in the public consciousness – if the public were to again became conscious of jazz."

== Track listing ==
"I Want to Talk About You" composed by Billy Eckstine. Remaining tracks composed by Charles Tolliver.

1. "On the Nile" – 13:33
2. "I Want to Talk About You" – 7:06
3. "Emperor March" – 13:51
4. "Chedlike" – 5:35
5. "In the Trenches" – 10:02
6. "Toughin'" – 11:22

== Personnel ==
- Charles Tolliver – conductor
- Todd Bashore – alto saxophone, flute, piccolo
- Bruce Williams – alto saxophone, soprano saxophone, clarinet, flute
- Billy Harper – tenor saxophone
- Marcus Strickland – tenor saxophone
- Bill Saxton – tenor saxophone, soprano saxophone, clarinet, flute
- Jason Marshall – baritone saxophone, bass clarinet
- Michael Williams – lead trumpet
- Cameron Johnson – trumpet
- Keyon Harrold – trumpet
- Ernest Stewart – trombone
- Jason Jackson – trombone
- Michael Dease – trombone
- Stafford Hunter – trombone
- Aaron Johnson – bass trombone
- Stanley Cowell – piano (track 1)
- Anthony Wonsey – piano (tracks 2–6)
- Reggie Workman – double bass
- Gene Jackson – drums
