= Camp Meeting (album) =

Studio album by Bruce Hornsby
- Released: August 7, 2007
- Recorded: April 5, 2007
- Studio: Tossington Sound (Williamsburg, Virginia)
- Genre: Jazz
- Length: 1:04:32
- Label: Legacy Recordings
- Producer: Bruce Hornsby

Bruce Hornsby chronology
Ricky Skaggs & Bruce Hornsby (2007)	Camp Meeting (2007)	Levitate (2009)

Camp Meeting is the tenth studio album by American pianist and singer Bruce Hornsby, who was joined by Christian McBride (bass) and Jack DeJohnette (drums). Pat Metheny was credited as "de facto" executive producer.

The album received a favorable review from JazzTimes, which described Hornsby's collaborators as "the best in the business" and the set list as "spectacular". It said: "What fun this record is ... Nothing here sounds like his pop music. Not only is his playing remarkable, but so is the interaction among the three musicians. The music stretches and contracts. It races, it gallops and it rumbles ... If these guys stick with it, they’ll be the freshest piano trio out there."

== Track listing ==
1. "Questions and Answers" (Ornette Coleman) - 4:53
2. "Charlie, Woody and You/Study #22" (B.R. Hornsby, Charles Ives) - 5:58
3. "Solar" (Miles Davis) - 7:03
4. "Death and the Flower" (Keith Jarrett) - 5:45
5. "Camp Meeting" (B.R. Hornsby) - 5:43
6. "Giant Steps" (John Coltrane) - 6:04
7. "Celia" (Bud Powell) - 7:50
8. "We'll Be Together Again" (Carl Fischer, Frankie Laine) - 5:38
9. "Stacked Mary Possum" (B.R. Hornsby) - 4:34
10. "Straight, No Chaser" (Thelonious Monk) - 2:59
11. "Un Poco Loco/Chant Song" (Bud Powell, B.R. Hornsby) - 7:55

== Personnel ==
- Bruce Hornsby – grand piano
- Christian McBride – double bass
- Jack DeJohnette – drums

== Production ==
- Pat Metheny – "De Facto" executive producer
- Bruce Hornsby – producer, mixing
- Joe Ferla – engineer
- Wayne Pooley – mixing, additional engineer
- Greg Calbi – mastering at Sterling Sound (New York City, New York)
- Melissa Smith – production assistant
- Dave Bett – art direction, design
- Kathy Hornsby – photography, cover painting ("Canopy")
- John Scher for Metropolitan Talent Management – management for Bruce Hornsby
