= Marcus Strickland =

Background information
- Born: February 24, 1979 (age 47); Gainesville, Florida, U.S.
- Genres: Jazz
- Occupations: Musician, songwriter, record producer, CEO, Strick Muzik
- Instrument: Saxophone. Bass Clarinet
- Years active: 1997–present
- Labels: Blue Note, Strick Muzik, Criss Cross, Fresh Sound
- Website: www.marcusstrickland.com

Marcus Strickland (born February 24, 1979) is an American jazz soprano, alto, and tenor saxophonist. He was born in Gainesville, Florida, and grew up in Miami. Down Beat magazine's Critics' Poll named him 'Rising Star on Tenor Saxophone' in 2010 and 'Rising Star on Soprano Saxophone' in 2008. JazzTimes magazine's Reader's Poll named him 'Best New Artist' in 2006. He placed third in the 2002 Thelonious Monk International Jazz Saxophone Competition. Additionally, he teaches jazz saxophone at the Frost School of Music at the University of Miami.

His band and concept project, Twi-Life deals with the connection and intersection between jazz and Soul & Hip Hop as inspired by the J Dilla aesthetic of intricacy, “drunk drumming” and tonal nuance. Strickland becomes beat maker, composer as well as saxophonist on these projects.

The saxophonist has nine releases as a leader: People of the Sun (2018), Nihil Novi (2016) on Blue Note Records; Triumph of the Heavy, Vol 1 & 2 (2011), Idiosyncrasies (2009), Open Reel Deck (2007), & Twi-Life (2006) on his own music label Strick Muzik (launched in 2006); Of Song (2009)on Criss Cross Records; Brotherhood (2002) & At Last (2001) on Fresh Sound Records.

In addition to his own Twi-Life, trio and quartet, Strickland has played with Christian McBride, Dave Douglas, Jeff 'Tain' Watts, and also had a five-year stint with the drummer Roy Haynes. Strickland has been on two Grammy-nominated recordings (including Fountain of Youth - Roy Haynes & Keystone). He considers his father an early inspiration, as he had been a drummer in jazz and rhythm and blues but is now a lawyer. Marcus' twin brother E.J. Strickland is a drummer, and is a member of Marcus' quartet and leads his own quintet as well.

== Select discography ==
=== As leader ===
- At Last (Fresh Sound, 2001)
- Brotherhood (Fresh Sound, 2003)
- Twi-Life (Strick Muzik, 2005)
- Open Reel Deck (Strick Muzik, 2007)
- Of Song (Criss Cross, 2009)
- Idiosyncrasies (Strick Muzik, 2009)
- Triumph of the Heavy, Vol. 1 & 2 (Strick Muzik, 2011)
- Nihil Novi (Blue Note, 2016)
- People of the Sun (Blue Note, 2018)
- The Universe's Wildest Dream (Strick Muzik, 2023)

=== As sideman ===
With Bilal

- VOYAGE-19 (2020)

With Dave Douglas

- Keystone (Greenleaf, 2005)
- Keystone: Live in Seden (Greenleaf, 2006)
- Moonshine (Greenleaf, 2007)
- Keystone: Live at the Jazz Standard (Greenleaf, 2008)
- Spark of Being (Greenleaf, 2010)

With Roy Haynes

- Fountain of Youth (Dreyfus, 2004)

With Mike Moreno

- Between the Lines (World Culture, 2007)

With Lonnie Plaxico

- Melange (Blue Note, 2001)
- Lonnie Plaxico Live at the 5:01 Jazz Bar (Orchard, 2002)
- Live at the Zinc Bar (Plaxmusic, 2007)

With E. J. Strickland

- In This Day (Strick Muzik, 2009)

With Bart Tarenskeen

- The Outer Rim (B-Art Records, 2013)

With Charles Tolliver

- Emperor March: Live at the Blue Note (Half Note, 2008 [2009])

With Christian McBride

- Christian McBride's New Jawn (Mack Avenue, 2018)
- Prime (Mack Avenue, 2023)

With Jeff "Tain" Watts

- Detained (Half Note, 2004)
- Folk's Songs (Dark Key, 2007)

With Chris "Daddy" Dave

- Chris Dave and the Drumhedz (Blue Note, 2018)
- Thine People (2021)

With Ben Williams

- State of Art (Concord, 2011)
- Coming of Age (Concord, 2017)
- I Am A Man (Rainbow Blonde, 2020)

With José James

- Merry Christmas from José James (Rainbow Blonde, 2021)

With Robert Glasper

- Mood (Fresh Sound, 2004)
