= SuperBass =

Live album by Ray Brown
- Released: 1997
- Genre: Jazz
- Length: 51:39
- Label: Telarc

Professional ratings
Review scores
Source	Rating
The Penguin Guide to Jazz Recordings	3/4 stars

SuperBass is a 1997 album by Ray Brown with Christian McBride and John Clayton, recorded live at Sculler's. The AllMusic review states: "The idea of a bass trio on records probably would have been unthinkable in the primitive days of recording when Brown was coming up, but Telarc's fabulously deep yet clear engineering makes it seem like a natural thing to do. Whether pizzicato or bowed, whether taking the melodic solo or plunking down the 4/4 bottom line, all three perform with amazing panache, taste, humor, lack of ego, and the sheer joy of talking to and against each other beneath the musical staff."

== Track listing ==
No.	Title	Length
1.	"SuperBass Theme"	0:50
2.	"Blue Monk"	7:52
3.	"Bye Bye Blackbird"	6:36
4.	"Lullaby Of Birdland"	2:59
5.	"Who Cares?" (Feat. Benny Green, Gregory Hutchinson)	4:31
6.	"Mack The Knife"	6:05
7.	"Centerpiece"	4:03
8.	"Sculler Blues" (Feat. Benny Green, Gregory Hutchinson)	10:16
9.	"Brown Funk" (Feat. Gregory Hutchinson)	9:26
10.	"SuperBass Theme"	0:53

== Personnel ==
=== Musicians ===
- Ray Brown – Bass (Upright)
- Christian McBride – Bass (Upright)
- John Clayton - Bass (Upright)
- Benny Green – Piano
- Gregory Hutchinson – Drums
