= A Family Affair (Christian McBride album) =

Studio album by Christian McBride
- Released: 1998
- Recorded: 27–29 January 1998 at O'Henry Studios, North Hollywood; January 30–31, 1998 at LeGonks, Hollywood
- Genre: Rhythm and blues
- Length: 65:54
- Label: Verve
- Producer: George Duke

Christian McBride chronology
Number Two Express (1996)	A Family Affair (1998)	Sci-Fi (2000)

A Family Affair is an album by Christian McBride. It was recorded in California and released in 1998 by Verve.

== Reception ==
Professional ratings
Review scores
Source	Rating
AllMusic	2.5/5 stars
The Encyclopedia of Popular Music	2.5/5 stars
The Penguin Guide to Jazz Recordings	3/4 stars

Bill Milkowski of JazzTimes noted "On his third album as a leader, bassist Christian McBride reveals more shades of his musical makeup than he's allowed to slip through in the past. Along with his renowned upright chops-typically solid and swinging in the great tradition of Ray Brown-the Philly phenom also reveals himself to be a Bootsy-influenced funkster, Jamerson-inspired groovemeister, and Jacoesque fretless electric soloist. All this, plus his first stab at lyric writing, makes A Family Affair McBride's most diverse and widely appealing project to date." Jim Santella of All About Jazz said "The toe-tapping music swings deliciously and is presented in a variety of different formats."

Phil Gallo of Variety wrote, "After two acoustic jazz albums for Verve and roles in the bands of Benny Green and Joshua Redman, he has turned to electric jazz for his "Family Affair" disc and marries funk and post-bop in a bountiful performance... He has yet to distinguish himself with a similar uniqueness on the electric bass. He does what others before him have done without necessarily expanding those concepts. But when he's thinking funk and classic jazz at the same time, as he does on "Brown Funk," a tribute to bassist Ray and singer James, he's headed in a direction that can only be good for the future of this music."

== Track listing ==
No.	Title	Writer(s)	Length
1.	"I'm Coming Home"	Thom Bell, Linda Creed	7:01
2.	"A Dream of You"	McBride	4:40
3.	"Family Affair"	Sylvester Stewart	6:42
4.	"Theme From our Fairytale"	McBride	6:59
5.	"...Or So You Thought"	McBride	5:42
6.	"Summer Soft"	Stevie Wonder	6:41
7.	"Brown Funk (For Ray)"	McBride	6:17
8.	"Open Sesame"	Ronald Bell, Kool & the Gang	9:29
9.	"Wayne's World"	McBride	7:32
10.	"I'll Write a Song for You"	Philip Bailey, Steve Beckmeier, Al McKay	4:51
Total length:			65:54

== Personnel ==
- Christian McBride – double bass, bass guitar, keyboards
- Tim Warfield – tenor saxophone
- Charles Craig – keyboards
- Russell Malone – guitar
- Gregory Hutchinson – drums
- Munyungo Jackson – percussion
- Will Downing – vocals
- Vesta – vocals

Production

- Chika Azuma – art direction, design
- Corine Duke – production co-ordination
- George Duke – producer
- Beverly Harris – release co-ordinator
- Eric Johnson – photography
- Estée Ochoa – stylist
- Doug Sax – mastering
- Richard Seidel – executive producer
- Camille Tominaro – production co-ordination
- Erik Zobler – engineer, mixing
- Robert Zuckerman – photography

== Chart performance ==
Chart (1998)	Peak position
US Jazz Albums (Billboard)	30
