= Kind of Brown =

Studio album by Christian McBride
- Released: June 16, 2009
- Recorded: September 2008
- Studio: Fantasy Studios, Berkeley, California.
- Genre: Jazz
- Length: 64:16
- Label: Mack Avenue MAC 1047
- Producer: Christian McBride

Christian McBride chronology
Live at Tonic (2006)	Kind of Brown (2009)	The Good Feeling (2011)

Professional ratings
Review scores
Source	Rating
All About Jazz	4.5/5 stars
AllMusic	4.5/5 stars
The Guardian	4/5 stars
PopMatters	8/10 stars
Tom Hull	B

Kind of Brown is a studio album by American jazz bassist Christian McBride together with his band Inside Straight, released on June 16, 2009. This was McBride's first album of new material in six years, and the first to be released on the Mack Avenue label.

== Background ==
Kind of Brown is the debut album for Christian McBride and his band Inside Straight. It was followed up with the second release, People Music in 2013. Kind of Brown was nominated for 41st NAACP Image Awards as an Outstanding Jazz Album. The album consists of 10 tracks mostly written by McBride.

== Reception ==
Will Lyman of PopMatters wrote "With his new band, “Inside Straight”, and its new disc Kind of Brown, McBride finally feels focused and serious. This music is unself-consciously traditional: it’s fun; it swings its ass off. It’s not experimental, but it gives superb voice to several brilliant players and one new discovery. This is the kind of recording that the great players of the past would have put out every year or so. And now Christian McBride, the finest bassist of his generation, is on track. It’s his best record, and it puts a little jump in your step. It’s hot."

Phil Johnson of The Independent noted "Heard live, the music of star bassist Christian McBride’s quintet might swing, but this album (a tribute to the late double bassist Ray Brown, not that you’d guess) is strictly jazz for middle managers: the themes are corny or cute; the feel is too polite to be properly funky and the frontline of soprano sax and vibes sounds ingratiating rather than challenging. The main problem here is that no one appears to have anything to say, or any particular reason to say it. Impeccably played, of course".

Damian Erskine of Bass Musician mentioned "Great solo performances are lavished on every tune behind a very hip and tight ensemble. Christian himself sounds better than ever, both in section mode, and offering up some very moving bass solos, again, everything we would expect from this very accomplished musician".

== Track listing ==
No.	Title	Writer(s)	Length
1.	"Brother Mister"	McBride	4:54
2.	"Theme for Kareem"	Freddie Hubbard	7:52
3.	"Rainbow Wheel"	McBride	6:31
4.	"Starbeam"	McBride	6:38
5.	"Used 'Ta Could"	McBride	6:35
6.	"The Shade of the Cedar Tree"	McBride	7:50
7.	"Pursuit of Peace"	Eric Scott Reed	6:07
8.	"Uncle James"	McBride	5:27
9.	"Stick & Move"	McBride	8:07
10.	"Where Are You?"	Harold Adamson, Jimmy McHugh	4:19
Total length:			64:16

== Personnel ==
Band

- Christian McBride – acoustic bass
- Steve Wilson – saxophone (alto, soprano)
- Warren Wolf, Jr. – vibraphone
- Eric Reed – piano
- Carl Allen – drums

Production

- Raj Naik – design
- Jesse Nichols – assistant engineer
- Justin Gerrish – engineer
- Joe Ferla – recording, mixing
- Gretchen Carhartt Valade – executive producer
- Keith Henry Brown – illustration
- Orrin Keepnews – liner notes
- Mark Wilder – mastering

== Chart performance ==
Chart (2009)	Peak position
US Jazz Albums (Billboard)	23
