= Warren Wolf (musician) =

American jazz vibraphonist

Warren Wolf Jr.
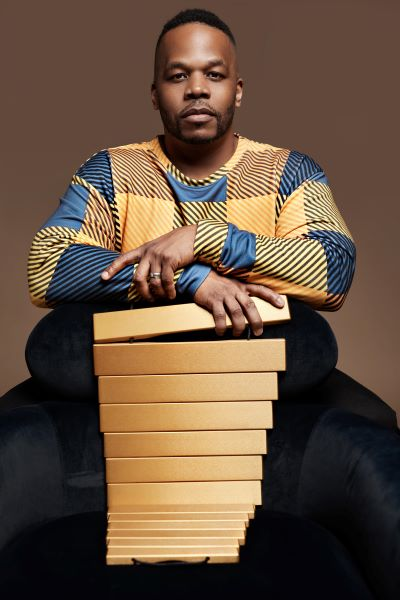
- Warren Wolf with vibraphone tone bars in 2024

Background information
- Born: Warren Edward Wolf Jr. November 10, 1979 (age 47); Baltimore, Maryland, U.S.
- Genre: Jazz
- Occupation: Musician
- Instruments: Vibraphone, marimba, drums, piano, percussion, vocals
- Label: Mack Avenue
- Website: www.warrenwolf.com

Warren Wolf Jr. (born November 10, 1979) is an American jazz vibraphonist and multi-instrumentalist from Baltimore, Maryland. He is on the faculty at Peabody Institute Conservatory of Music and the San Francisco Conservatory of Music.

== Biography ==
Warren Wolf was born in November of 1979 to Warren Wolf Sr. and Celeste Wolf. Wolf began his music studies at the age of three, learning the vibraphone, marimba, drums, and piano. A classically trained musician, he attended the Peabody Institute's preparatory program for eight years. He graduated with honors from the Baltimore School for the Arts in 1997.

He went to Berklee College of Music in 1997, graduating in 2001. At Berklee, he studied under jazz vibraphonist Dave Samuels for seven of eight semesters, the remaining semester being spent receiving instruction from vibraphonist Ed Saindon. During his time at Berklee, Wolf was an active member of Boston's jazz scene, playing the vibraphone, drums, and piano, and with his friend, trumpeter Jason Palmer he co-led a group at Wally's Cafe, where he worked as house drummer. During his time at Berklee, he collaborated with musicians in school such as Jeremy Pelt, Jaleel Shaw, Rashawn Ross, Walter Smith III, Kendrick Scott and John Mayer. He remained active on the Boston jazz scene as a local musician and in September 2003, Wolf became an instructor in the percussion department at the Berklee College of Music. At Berklee, he gave private lessons on the vibraphone and drums, and taught a beginners' keyboard class for entering freshmen majoring in drum performance.

Since leaving Berklee in 2005 for Baltimore, Wolf has been active on the international jazz scene, touring with Bobby Watson's "Live and Learn" Sextet, Karriem Riggins' "Virtuoso Experience", Donal Fox's Scarlatti Jazz Suite Project, Christian McBride & "Inside Straight", and with his own group of young musicians, "Wolfpack". He is also a member of the Aaron Diehl Quartet and the SFJAZZ Collective. His reputation as a musician has been acknowledged by jazz critics such as the New York Times′s Ben Ratliff, who favorably reviewed Wolf's performance of November 16, 2011, at the 92nd Street Y's 92YTribeca venue, a performance that was featured by NPR with a 60-minute video on its website.

Wolf has made several recordings as a leader and a sideman. In 2011 he released his self titled album Warren Wolf featuring Christian McBride on bass, Peter Martin on piano, Greg Hutchinson on drums, Tim Green on alto and soprano saxophones, and Jeremy Pelt on trumpet. The album received positive reviews from jazz critics, with Greg Thomas of the New York Daily News writing of the CD: "To say that Warren Wolf's Mack Avenue debut is auspicious would be an understatement. No doubt, this is one of the best of the year in jazz." Wolf's other notable recordings as a leader are Incredible Jazz Vibes (M & I, 2005) (featuring Mulgrew Miller on piano, Vicente Archer on bass, and Kendrick Scott on drums), and Black Wolf (M & I, 2009) (again featuring Mulgrew Miller on piano, with Rodney Whitaker on bass, and Jeff "Tain" Watts on drums). He recorded the solo vibraphone and marimba album Life (J.M.I. 2025) on tape at Reservoir Studios on March 11, 2023.

== Discography ==
=== As leader ===
Year	Title	Label
2005	Incredible Jazz Vibes	M & I
2009	Black Wolf	M & I
2011	Warren Wolf	Mack Avenue
2013	Wolfgang	Mack Avenue
2016	Convergence	Mack Avenue
2020	Reincarnation	Mack Avenue
2020	Christmas Vibes	Mack Avenue
2023	Chano Pozo: Origins	Wolfpack
2024	History of the Vibraphone	Cellar Music Group
2025	Life	J.M.I. Recordings

=== As sideman ===
With Christian McBride & Inside Straight

- Kind of Brown (Mack Avenue, 2009)
- People Music (Mack Avenue, 2013)
- Live at the Village Vanguard (Mack Avenue, 2021)

With Christian Sands

- Embracing Dawn (Mack Avenue, 2024)

With SFJAZZ Collective

- 10th Anniversary: Best of Live at the SFJAZZ Center (2014)
- The Music of Joe Henderson and Original Compositions Live: SFJAZZ Center (2015)
- The Music of Michael Jackson and Original Compositions Live: SFJAZZ Center (2016)
- The Music of Miles Davis and Original Compositions Live: SFJAZZ Center (2017)
- Original Compositions & The Music of Ornette Coleman, Stevie Wonder and Thelonius Monk (2018)
- The Music of Antônio Carlos Jobim and Original Compositions Live: SFJAZZ Center (2019)
- 50th Anniversary: Miles Davis' "In A Silent Way" and Sly & The Family Stone "Stand!" (2020)
- New Works Reflecting The Moment (2022)
- New Works & Classics Reimagined: Live from SFJAZZ Center (2022)
- Twenty Year Retrospective, Vol. 3 (2024)

With Willie Jones III

- The Next Phase (WJ3 Records 2010)
- Groundwork (WJ3 Records 2015)

With others

- Aaron Diehl, The Bespoke Man's Narrative (Mack Avenue 2013)
- Adonis Rose, On the Verge (Criss Cross, 2007)

=== Compilations ===
- Live! From the 2013 Detroit Jazz Festival (Mack Avenue, 2014)
- It's Christmas on Mack Avenue (Mack Avenue, 2014)
