= Live at Tonic (Christian McBride album) =

Live album by Christian McBride
- Released: May 2, 2006
- Recorded: January 10–11, 2005
- Venues: Tonic, New York City
- Genre: Jazz
- Length: 3:31:08
- Label: Ropeadope
- Producers: Andy Blackman Hurwitz, Christian McBride

Christian McBride chronology
Vertical Vision (2003)	Live at Tonic (2006)	Kind of Brown (2009)

Professional ratings
Review scores
Source	Rating
All About Jazz	4/5 stars
AllMusic	3/5 stars
The Buffalo News	3/4 stars
The Guardian	3/5 stars
PopMatters	6/10
Tom Hull	B+
The Penguin Guide to Jazz Recordings	2.5/4 stars

Live at Tonic is a three-disc album by bassist Christian McBride, recorded at Tonic in New York on January 10–11, 2005. The album was released on May 2, 2006, by Ropeadope Records. Tonic was a music venue located at 107 Norfolk Street, New York City, which opened in the spring of 1998 and closed in April 2007.

== Reception ==
John Fordham, writing for The Guardian commented: "McBride's roots lie in R&B, funk and Philly soul as much as bebop. This triple live album is an impressive commitment to the primacy of groove-based music, freedom, jazz and dance." Will Layman of PopMatters commented "That the Christian McBride Band is already a get-you-to-your-feet live act is without question. But are they a thoughtful jazz group that is moving the music forward? Maybe that's not what this two-night stand was about. But, after sticking with it and even enjoying it for its three-disc length, you probably have the right to expect more the next time out. We'll see." The Buffalo News review by Jeff Simon noted, "There's no use anyone pretending to weep and wail over McBride's abandonment of Charles Mingus Way for an aerie on the path begun by the late Jaco Pastorius. McBride is a large, lusty jazz spirit and definitely his own infectious kind of bandleader."

Scott Yanow of Allmusic stated: "Live at Tonic is a three-CD set that contains highlights from his opening sets during two nights at Tonic on the first disc, and his complete second sets on discs two and three. It is clear, after hearing the first couple of numbers, that McBride loves funk and stretching out. The first disc has his regular quartet with tenor-saxophonist Ron Blake, keyboardist Geoff Keezer, and drummer Terreon Gully digging into eight numbers, including Weather Report's "Boogie Woogie Waltz" and some straight-ahead jamming. The second disc has the group augmented by guest pianist Jason Moran, violinist Jenny Scheinman, and guitarist Charlie Hunter, while the third has guests on trumpet, guitar, boom box, and turntables. Unfortunately, the songs (particularly on the second and third CDs) are not of very high quality and the funk seems to go on forever, particularly on the 29-minute "See Jam, Hear Jam, Feel Jam" ... There are some good moments along the way and the musicians are great, but some editing and common sense should have gone into this production."

== Track listing ==
=== Disc 1 ===
No.	Title	Length
1.	"Technicolor Nightmare"	12:48
2.	"Say Something"	6:04
3.	"Clerow's Flipped"	6:05
4.	"Lejos De Usted"	7:01
5.	"Sonic Tonic"	11:44
6.	"Hibiscus"	6:02
7.	"Sitting on a Cloud"	6:52
8.	"Boogie Woogie Waltz"	14:54

=== Disc 2 ===
No.	Title	Length
1.	"See Jam, Hear Jam, Feel Jam"	29:23
2.	"Out Jam / Give It Up or Turn It Loose"	9:35
3.	"Lower East Side / Rock Jam"	6:26
4.	"Hemisphere Jam"	3:36
5.	"Bitches Brew"	4:51
6.	"Out Jam / Via Mwandishi"	7:57
7.	"Mwandishi Outcome Jam"	7:10
8.	"The Comedown (LSD Jam)"	3:58

=== Disc 3 ===
No.	Title	Length
1.	"E Jam"	33:03
2.	"AB Minor Jam"	12:59
3.	"D Shuffle Jam"	9:00
4.	"D Shuffle Jam, Pt. 2"	11:32

== Personnel ==
Christian McBride Band

- Christian McBride – bass (acoustic, electric)
- Geoffrey Keezer – keyboards
- Terreon Gully – drums
- Ron Blake – saxophones (tenor, soprano, baritone), flute

Additional musicians

- Charlie Hunter – guitar
- Jason Moran – piano
- Jenny Scheinman – violin
- DJ Logic – turntables
- Scratch – beatboxing
- Eric Krasno – guitars
- Rashawn Ross – trumpets

== Chart performance ==
Chart (2006)	Peak position
US Jazz Albums (Billboard)	8
