= The Good Feeling =

Studio album by Christian McBride Big Band
- Released: September 27, 2011
- Studio: Avatar, New York City
- Genre: Jazz
- Length: 70:27
- Label: Mack Avenue
- Producer: Christian McBride

Christian McBride chronology
Kind of Brown (2009)	The Good Feeling (2011)	Conversations with Christian (2011)

Professional ratings
Review scores
Source	Rating
All About Jazz	4/5 stars
AllMusic	4/5 stars
Jazzwise	3/5 stars
Tom Hull	B+

The Good Feeling is a studio album by the Christian McBride Big Band. It won the Grammy Award for Best Large Jazz Ensemble Album at the 54th Annual Grammy Awards in 2012. The record was released on September 27, 2011 via the Mack Avenue label.

== Background ==
This is his first full big band recording as a leader. McBride plays with a 17-piece band featuring saxophonists Ron Blake, Loren Schoenberg and Steve Wilson; trumpeters Frank Greene and Nicholas Payton; trombonists Steve Davis, Michael Dease and Douglas Purviance; pianist Xavier Davis; and drummer Ulysses Owens, among others. Together, the band presents six originals going with five jazz standards. McBride said "I’m looking forward to writing more material, and I’m really hoping to keep this concept ‘above sea level".

== Reception ==
Philip Booth of Jazz Times noted "Christian McBride, one of two high-profile veteran bassists making debuts as big-band leaders this season (along with Ron Carter), offers 11 of his arrangements, a mix of original compositions and standards. McBride’s career orchestrating for large ensembles, as he recounts in the liner notes, began a little more than 15 years ago with a commission from the Jazz at Lincoln Center Orchestra. That piece, “Bluesin’ in Alphabet City,” is here, and it’s a charmer, a bluesy swinger with the trombone section’s melody answered by trumpet and saxophone rejoinders before opening up for solos, including a showcase for the leader’s speedy fingerboard flights and chopping-wood tone. Bluesy swagger also marks “In a Hurry,” originally heard on McBride's debut album and here building into a ferocious, criss-crossing bone battle between Michael Dease and James Burton. It's topped off with the leader's quick-witted bowed solo, a shouted chorus, and an extended, aptly explosive drum solo from Ulysses Owens Jr."

Reviewers of SFJAZZ Center wrote "...until 2011's The Good Feeling, McBride had never recorded an album with his own big band. As the title implies, it's a swaggering, hard-swinging session featuring a cast of New York's best sidemen, winning the GRAMMY Award for Best Large Ensemble Jazz Album in 2012.

Jake Kot of Bass Musician said "Great solo performances are lavished on every tune behind a very hip and tight ensemble. Christian himself sounds better than ever, both in section mode, and offering up some very moving bass solos, again, everything we would expect from this very accomplished musician".

== Track listing ==
All tracks are written by Christian McBride except where noted.

No.	Title	Writer(s)	Length
1.	"Shake 'n' Blake"		7:22
2.	"Broadway"	Bill Bird, Teddy McRae, Henri Woode	4:05
3.	"Brother Mister"		4:53
4.	"When I Fall in Love"	Edward Heyman, Victor Young	5:17
5.	"Science Fiction"		11:46
6.	"The Shade of the Cedar Tree"		8:17
7.	"The More I See You"	Mack Gordon, Harry Warren	3:49
8.	"I Should Care"	Sammy Cahn, Axel Stordahl, Paul Weston	5:45
9.	"A Taste of Honey"	Ric Marlow, Bobby Scott	3:28
10.	"Bluesin' in Alphabet City"		8:45
11.	"In a Hurry"		7:01
Total length:			70:27

== Personnel ==
- Christian McBride – double bass
- Steve Wilson – alto saxophone, flute
- Todd Bashore – alto saxophone, flute
- Ron Blake – saxophone (tenor, soprano), flute
- Todd Williams – tenor saxophone, flute
- Loren Schoenberg – tenor saxophone
- Carl Maraghi – baritone saxophone, bass clarinet
- Frank Greene – trumpet
- Freddie Hendrix – trumpet
- Nicholas Payton – trumpet
- Nabati Isles – trumpet
- James Burton – trombone
- Steve Davis – trombone
- Michael Dease – trombone
- Douglas Purviance – bass trombone
- Xavier Davis – piano
- Ulysses Owens – drums
- Melissa Walker – vocals
