= Michael Dease =

American jazz musician, composer, and producer (born 1982)

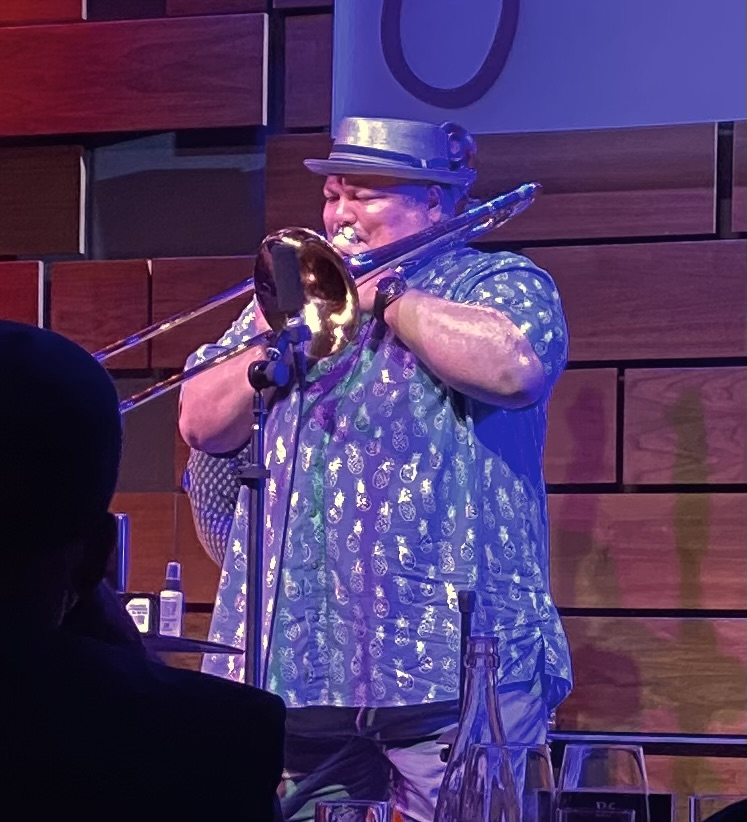
- Dease performing with David Sanborn at Jazz St. Louis, September 2023

Background information
- Born: Michael Patrick Dease; August 25, 1982 (age 43); Augusta, Georgia, U.S.
- Genres: Jazz
- Occupation: Musician
- Instruments: Trombone; bass trombone; saxophone
- Years active: 2002–present
- Labels: Jazz Legacy; Blues Back; D-Clef; Posi-Tone
- Formerly of: Christian McBride Big Band; Dizzy Gillespie All-Stars; Roy Hargrove Big Band
- Website: www.michaeldease.com

Michael Patrick Dease (born August 25, 1982) is an American jazz tenor and bass trombonist, composer, and producer. He also plays saxophone, trumpet, flugelhorn, bass, and piano.

== Biography ==
Michael Dease was born in Augusta, Georgia, and attended John S. Davidson Fine Arts Magnet High School, where he studied saxophone and voice. During his time as a high school student, he achieved all-state honors on the latter instrument for three years in a row.

At age 17, Michael taught himself to play trombone, and was soon invited to join the inaugural class of the Juilliard jazz studies program by Wycliffe Gordon. Dease would go on to earn both his bachelor's and master's degrees while at the school. His teachers included Wycliffe Gordon, Steve Turre, Vincent Gardner, John Drew, and Joseph Alessi. While at Juilliard, Dease won many awards, including the Frank Rosolino Award, J.J. Johnson Award, the Sammy Nestico Jazz Composers Award, ASCAP Young Jazz Composer Award, and the Fish Middleton Jazz Competition.

He began his career in Illinois Jacquet's big band in 2002, and has performed as a featured member of the Dizzy Gillespie All-Star Big Band, Christian McBride Big Band, Roy Hargrove Big Band, Nicholas Payton Big Band, Jimmy Heath Big Band, and the Charles Tolliver Big Band. Dease has also performed with small groups led by Claudio Roditi, Rodney Whitaker, Wycliffe Gordon, and David Sanborn. In addition to performance, Dease serves as president and producer at his jazz record label, D-Clef Records.

Dease has toured extensively throughout Europe, Asia, North America, and Latin America. Previous engagements include the Nice Jazz Festival, North Sea Jazz Festival, Tims Jazz Festival, Montreal Jazz Festival, Toronto Jazz Festival, Monterey Jazz Festival, and the Spoleto Music Festival. He was a guest artist at the International Trombone Festival on June 22–25, 2011, at Vanderbilt University in Nashville, Tennessee.

Dease's album Grace (2010) received excellent reviews from publications such as JazzTimes, All About Jazz, and The Guardian (UK).

== Educator ==
Dease has conducted masterclasses and workshops at universities and conservatories around the world, including at the University of Costa Rica, University of Osaka, Michigan State University, Augusta State University, Broward College, Simpson College, University of Scranton, and Northeastern University.

Dease currently holds the position of Associate Professor of Jazz Trombone at the Michigan State University College of Music. He has also held similar positions at Queens College, CUNY, and The New School for Jazz and Contemporary Music in New York City.

Dease performs exclusively on Yamaha trombones and plays the YSL-891Z model.

== Discography ==
=== As leader ===
- The Takeover (self-released, 2005)
- Dease Bones (D-Clef, 2007)
- Clarity (Blues Back, 2008)
- Grace (Jazz Legacy Productions, 2010)
- Coming Home (D-Clef, 2013)
- Relentless (Posi-Tone, 2014)
- Decisions (Posi-Tone, 2015)
- Let's Get Real (Spice of Life [Japan], 2015)
- Father Figure (Posi-Tone, 2016)
- All These Hands (Posi-Tone, 2017)
- Reaching Out (Posi-Tone, 2018)
- Bonafide (Posi-Tone, 2018)
- Never More Here (Posi-Tone, 2019)
- Give It All You Got (Posi-Tone, 2021)
- Best Next Thing (Posi-Tone, 2022)
- The Other Shoe: The Music of Greg Hill (Origin, 2023)
- Swing Low (Posi-Tone, 2023)
- Flow (Posi-Tone, 2025)

=== As sideman ===
With Sharel Cassity

- Relentless (Jazz Legacy Productions, 2009)

With Matt Garrison

- Familiar Places (D-Clef, 2010)

With the Dizzy Gillespie All-Star Big Band

- I'm BeBoppin' Too (Half Note, 2008)

With Illinois Jacquet

- Swingin' Live With Illinois Jacquet: His Final Performance (Jacquet, 2006)

With Alicia Keys

- As I Am (J Records, 2007)

With the Christian McBride Big Band

- The Good Feeling (Mack Avenue, 2011)
- Bringin' It (Mack Avenue, 2017)

With Claudio Roditi

- Simpatico (Resonance, 2010)

With the Charles Tolliver Big Band

- Emperor March: Live at the Blue Note (Half Note, 2009)
