= Christian McBride =

American jazz bassist, composer, and arranger

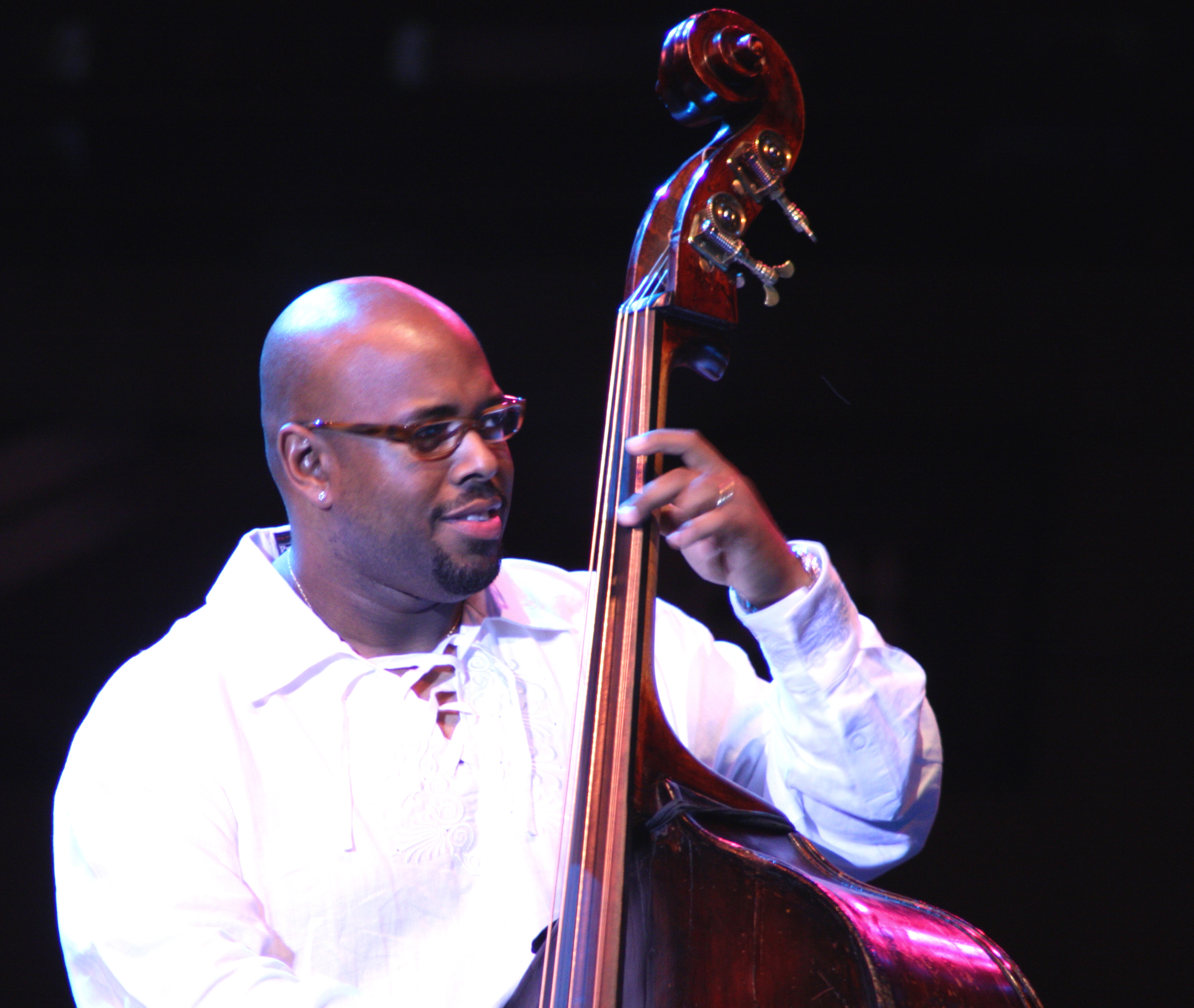
- McBride at the 2009 Detroit Jazz Festival

Background information
- Born: May 31, 1972 (age 54); Philadelphia, Pennsylvania, US
- Genres: Jazz, jazz fusion, big band
- Occupation: Musician
- Instruments: Double bass, bass guitar
- Years active: 1989–present
- Labels: Verve, Warner Bros., Ropeadope, Mack Avenue
- Website: www.christianmcbride.com

Christian McBride (born May 31, 1972) is an American jazz bassist, bandleader and composer. He has appeared on more than 400 recordings as a sideman, and is an eleven-time Grammy Award winner.

McBride has performed and recorded with a number of jazz musicians and ensembles, including Freddie Hubbard, McCoy Tyner, Herbie Hancock, Pat Metheny, Joe Henderson, Diana Krall, Roy Haynes, Chick Corea, Wynton Marsalis, Eddie Palmieri, Joshua Redman, George Duke, and Ray Brown's "SuperBass" with John Clayton, as well as with pop, hip-hop, soul, and classical musicians like Sting, Paul McCartney, Celine Dion, Isaac Hayes, The Roots, Queen Latifah, Kathleen Battle, Renee Fleming, Carly Simon, Bruce Hornsby, and James Brown.

== Early life ==
McBride was born in Philadelphia on May 31, 1972. After starting on bass guitar, McBride switched to double bass. He is a graduate of the Philadelphia High School for Creative and Performing Arts and studied at the Juilliard School.

== Later life and career ==
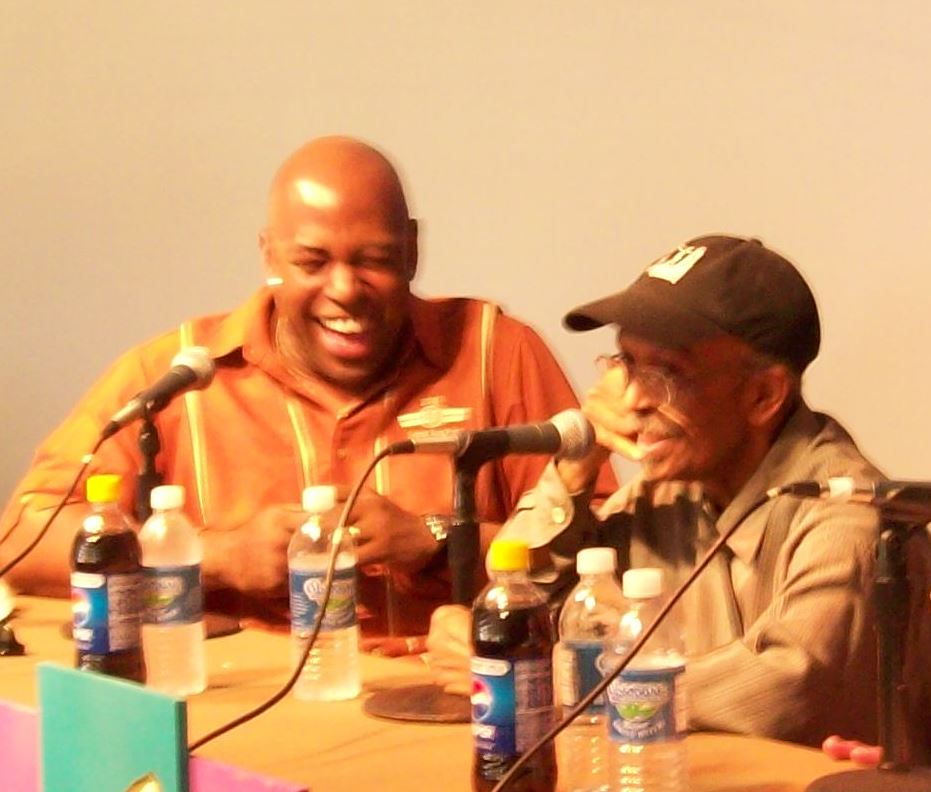
McBride, left with Jimmy Heath

McBride was heralded as a teen prodigy when he joined saxophonist Bobby Watson's group, Horizon, at the age of 17. From age 17 to 22, McBride played in the bands of older musicians such as Watson, Freddie Hubbard, Benny Golson, Milt Jackson, J. J. Johnson and Hank Jones, as well as his peers such as Roy Hargrove, Benny Green, and Joshua Redman. In 1992, jazz bassist Ray Brown formed a group called SuperBass with McBride and Brown protégé John Clayton. The group released two albums: SuperBass: Live at Scullers (1997) and SuperBass 2: Live at the Blue Note (2001).

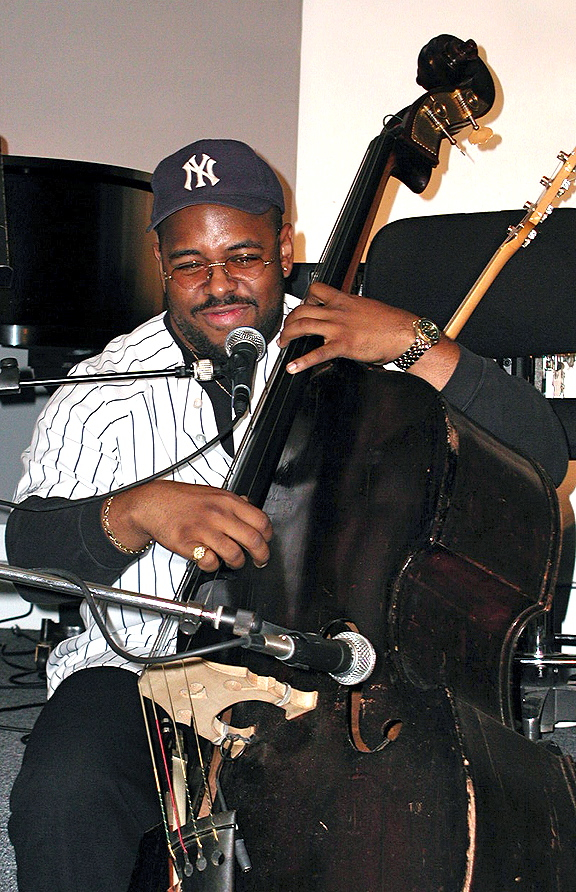
Christian McBride performing at New York Bass Collective

McBride was a member of saxophonist Joshua Redman's Quartet in the early 1990s with pianist Brad Mehldau and drummer Brian Blade. McBride began leading his own groups in 1995 after the release of his debut album Gettin' to It (Verve). Saxophonist Tim Warfield, pianists Charles Craig and Joey Calderazzo, and drummers Carl Allen and Greg Hutchinson are among the musicians who played in McBride's early groups. From 2000 to 2008, McBride led his own ensemble, the Christian McBride Band, with saxophonist Ron Blake, pianist/keyboardist Geoffrey Keezer, and drummer Terreon Gully. The band released two albums: Vertical Vision (Warner Bros., 2003) and Live at Tonic (Ropeadope, 2006).

McBride appeared as a featured collaborator on Dave Brubeck's 1995 album Young Lions & Old Tigers. Brubeck composed the track "Here Comes McBride" as a piano and double bass duet for the two musicians. A review in PopMatters described the piece as having a jaunty blues feel that reflected Brubeck's roots in stride piano.

In 1996, McBride contributed to the AIDS benefit album Offbeat: A Red Hot Soundtrip produced by the Red Hot Organization.

McBride primarily plays double bass; however, he is equally adept on bass guitar. He played both on the album The Philadelphia Experiment, which included keyboardist Uri Caine and hip-hop drummer Ahmir "Questlove" Thompson. Other projects have included tours and recordings with the Pat Metheny Trio, the Bruce Hornsby Trio, and Queen Latifah. Like Paul Chambers, McBride can solo by playing his bass arco style.

In 2006, McBride was named to the position of Creative Chair for Jazz with the Los Angeles Philharmonic, taking over from Dianne Reeves. He was signed to a two-year contract that was renewed for an additional two years. He was succeeded by Herbie Hancock in 2010.

McBride performed with Sonny Rollins and Roy Haynes at Carnegie Hall on September 18, 2007, in commemoration of Rollins' 50th anniversary of his first performance there. McBride was also tapped by CBS to be a producer for the tribute to Rollins on the 2011 Kennedy Center Honors broadcast.

In 2008, McBride joined John McLaughlin, Chick Corea, Kenny Garrett and Vinnie Colaiuta in a jazz fusion supergroup called the Five Peace Band. They released an album in February 2009 and completed their world tour in May of that year, as Brian Blade took over for Vinnie Colaiuta as drummer in Asia and some US concerts. The album Five Peace Band Live won the 2010 Grammy Award for Best Jazz Instrumental Album, Individual or Group

In 2011, McBride released his first big band album, The Good Feeling, for which he won the Grammy for Best Large Jazz Ensemble Performance. For 2026 Grammy Awards, he got a nomination for the album Windows - Live in the Best Jazz Performance category alongside Chick Corea & Brian Blade.

McBride has led several groups: Inside Straight, featuring alto/soprano saxophonist Steve Wilson, vibraphonist Warren Wolf, pianist Peter Martin and drummer Carl Allen; a trio featuring pianist Christian Sands and drummer Ulysses Owens, Jr. (and later, drummer Jerome Jennings); his 18-piece big band; an experimental funk group called A Christian McBride Situation with pianist/keyboardist Patrice Rushen, turntablists DJ Logic and Jahi Sundance, saxophonist Ron Blake and vocalist Alyson Williams; the New Jawn, featuring trumpeter Josh Evans, saxophonist Marcus Strickland, and drummer Nasheet Waits; and most recently (starting in 2022), Ursa Major, featuring saxophonist Nicole Glover, guitarist Ely Perlman, pianist/keyboardist Mike King, and drummer Savannah Harris.

In March 2016, McBride was named artistic director of the Newport Jazz Festival, succeeding the festival's founder and artistic director, George Wein. He stepped down in September 2025.

McBride hosts NPR's radio show, Jazz Night In America.

== Personal life ==
Christian is married to jazz singer and educator Melissa Walker. Walker, with contributions by McBride, leads the Jazz House Kids, a jazz school in their home town of Montclair, New Jersey. Each summer, they both appear at the Montclair Jazz Festival, along with student ensembles led by the instructors, professional ensembles composed of instructors, and guest acts.

McBride shared the story of his first encounters with Freddie Hubbard in "The Gig" and his relationship with James Brown in "Mr. Soul On Top" on The Moth Radio Hour, a radio show and podcast devoted to story-telling.

== James Moody Jazz Festival ==
McBride curates and advises the annual James Moody Jazz Festival, which is held at the New Jersey Performing Arts Center (NJPAC) in Newark, NJ.

== Discography ==
=== As leader/co-leader ===
Recording date	Title	Label	Year released	Personnel / Notes
1994–08 – 1994–09	Gettin' to It	Verve	1995	
1995–11	Number Two Express	Verve	1996	
1998–01	A Family Affair	Verve	1998	
2000–02	SciFi	Verve	2000	
2002–06	Vertical Vision	Warner Bros.	2003	
2005–01	Live at Tonic	Ropeadope	2006	Live
2008–09	Kind of Brown	Mack Avenue	2009	with Inside Straight
2009	Conversations with Christian	Mack Avenue	2011	
2011?	The Good Feeling	Mack Avenue	2011	Big Band. Grammy Award for Best Large Jazz Ensemble Album.
2012–04	Out Here	Mack Avenue	2013	
2013?	People Music	Mack Avenue	2013	with Inside Straight
2013–09	The Movement Revisited	Mack Avenue	2020	
2014–12	Live at the Village Vanguard	Mack Avenue	2021	Live with Inside Straight
2014–12	Live at the Village Vanguard (trio)	Mack Avenue	2015	Live. Grammy Award for Best Improvised Jazz Solo.
2017?	Bringin' It	Mack Avenue	2017	Big Band. Grammy Award for Best Large Jazz Ensemble Album.
2017–05	Christian McBride's New Jawn	Mack Avenue	2018	
2019	For Jimmy, Wes and Oliver	Mack Avenue	2020	Big Band. Grammy Award for Best Large Jazz Ensemble Album.
2021–12	Prime	Mack Avenue	2023	
2019 – 2022	But Who's Gonna Play the Melody?	Mack Avenue	2024	Co-led duo with Edgar Meyer
2025?	Without Further Ado, Vol 1	Mack Avenue	2025	Big Band. Grammy Award for Best Large Jazz Ensemble Album.

Collaborations
With Roy Hargrove and Stephen Scott

- Parker's Mood (Verve, 1995)

With Nicholas Payton and Mark Whitfield

- Fingerpainting: The Music of Herbie Hancock (Verve, 1997)

As The Philadelphia Experiment
(with Uri Caine, Ahmir "Questlove" Thompson, Pat Martino, John Swana, Larry Gold and Aaron Levinson)

- The Philadelphia Experiment (Ropeadope, 2001) – rec. 2000

With Chick Corea and Steve Gadd

- Super Trio: Live at The One World Theatre, April 3rd, 2005 (Mad Hatter Productions, 2006) – Live rec. 2005

With Hank Jones and Jimmy Cobb

- West of 5th (Chesky, 2006)

With Craig Taborn and Tyshawn Sorey

- Flaga: Book of Angels Volume 27 (Tzadik, 2016) – rec. 2015 as part of John Zorn's Book of Angels series

Compilation

- It's Christmas on Mack Avenue (Mack Avenue, 2014)

=== As sideman ===
Recording date	Main artist	Album title	Label	Year released	Notes
1990–09	Wallace Roney	Obsession	Muse	1991	
1990–10	Roy Hargrove	Public Eye	Novus/RCA	1991	
1991–03	Benny Green	Greens	Blue Note	1991	
1991?	Kenny Kirkland	Kenny Kirkland	GRP	1991	
1991–04	Ricky Ford	Hot Brass	Candid	1992	
1991–06	Gary Bartz	Shadows	Timeless	1992	
1991–09	Joe Henderson	Lush Life: The Music of Billy Strayhorn	Verve	1992	Henderson won a Grammy Award for Best Improvised Jazz Solo
1991–09	Houston Person	The Lion and His Pride	Muse	1994	
1991–11	Benny Green	Testifyin': Live at the Village Vanguard	Blue Note	1992	Live
1991–12	Freddie Hubbard	Live at Fat Tuesday's	MusicMasters	1992	Live
1991–09, 1992–01	Etta Jones	Reverse the Charges	Muse	1992	
1992–06	Benny Carter	Legends	MusicMasters	1993	
1992–12	Mulgrew Miller	Hand in Hand	Novus	1993	
1992–12	Benny Green	That's Right!	Blue Note	1993	
1992–12	Chris Potter	Presenting Chris Potter	Criss Cross Jazz	1993	
1992	Joshua Redman	Joshua Redman	Warner Bros.	1993	
1993–01	Don Braden	After Dark	Criss Cross Jazz	1994	
1993–02, 1993–03	Harold Mabern	Lookin' on the Bright Side	DIW	1993	
1993–06	Wallace Roney	Munchin'	Muse	1993	
1993–06	Joe Lovano	Tenor Legacy	Blue Note	1994	
1993?	Harold Mabern	The Leading Man	DIW	1993	
1994–03	Joshua Redman	Moodswing	Warner Bros.	1994	
1994–03	Benny Green	The Place To Be	Blue Note	1994	
1994?	David Sanborn	Pearls	Elektra	1995	
1994–09, 1994–11	Joe Henderson	Double Rainbow: The Music of Antonio Carlos Jobim	Verve	1995	
1994–05, 1994–08, 1994–11	Abbey Lincoln	A Turtle's Dream	Verve	1995	
1994–09	Diana Krall	Only Trust Your Heart	GRP	1995	
1994–11	McCoy Tyner	Prelude and Sonata	Milestone	1995	
1994–12	Peter Bernstein	Signs of Life	Criss Cross Jazz	1995	
1994–12	Teddy Edwards	Tango in Harlem	Verve/Gitanes	1995	
1994–03, 1995–01	Joe Lovano	Quartets: Live at the Village Vanguard	Blue Note	1995	Live
1995–01	Jimmy Smith	Damn!	Verve	1995	
1995–01	Jimmy Smith	Angel Eyes: Ballads & Slow Jams	Verve	1996	
1995–01	Roy Hargrove	Family	Verve	1995	
1995–03, 1995–04	Brad Mehldau	Introducing Brad Mehldau	Warner Bros.	1995	
1995?	Michael Wolff	Jumpstart!	Jimco	1995	
1995	Michael Wolff	2AM	Cabana Boy	1995	
1995–10	Fleurine	Meant to Be!	Blue Music	1996	
1996–01	Cedar Walton	Composer	Astor Place	1996	
1996–03	McCoy Tyner	What the World Needs Now: The Music of Burt Bacharach	Impulse!	1997	
1992–03, 1996–06	Joe Henderson	Big Band	Verve	1997	
1996–08	Harold Mabern	Mabern's Grooveyard	DIW	1998	
1996–08	Frank Foster	Leo Rising	Arabesque	1997	
1996	Chick Corea	Remembering Bud Powell	Stretch	1997	
1997–03	Renee Rosnes	As We Are Now	Blue Note	1997	
1997?	Diana Krall	Love Scenes	Impulse!	1997	
1997?	Bob Dorough	Right On My Way Home	Blue Note	1997	on tracks #1, 3–5, 7
1998–06	Yutaka Shiina	United	BMG	1998	
1998?	Freddie Hubbard	God Bless the Child	MusicMasters Jazz	1998	
1998?	George Duke	After Hours	Warner Bros.	1998	
1999–01	Benny Green	These Are Soulful Days	Blue Note	1999	
1999–05– 1999–06	Eliane Elias	Everything I Love	Blue Note	2000	
1999–06	Harold Mabern	Maya with Love	DIW	2000	
2000?	Benny Green	Naturally	Telarc	2000	
2001–01	Jim Hall	Jim Hall & Basses	Telarc	2001	on tracks #2, 8
2001–01, 2001–03, 2001–06	Diana Krall	The Look of Love	Verve	2001	
2001–09	Sting	All This Time	A&M	2001	
2001–11, 2001–12	Diana Krall	Live in Paris	Verve	2002	Live
2002	George Duke	Face the Music	Big Piano Music (BPM)	2002	
2002	Chris Botti	December	Columbia	2002	
2002–12	Chick Corea	Rendezvous in New York	Stretch	2004	Live
2003–01	Pat Martino	Think Tank	Blue Note	2003	
2003?	Sting	Sacred Love	A&M	2003	
2003?	David Sanborn	Time Again	Verve	2003	
2003–11	McCoy Tyner	Illuminations	Telarc	2004	Grammy Award for Best Jazz Instrumental Album
2003– 2004	Diana Krall	The Girl in the Other Room	Verve	2004	
2004?	Regina Belle	Lazy Afternoon	Peak	2004	
2004?	David Sanborn	Closer	Verve	2004	
2004–12	Pat Metheny	Tokyo Day Trip	Nonesuch	2008	Live
2005–01	Eddie Palmieri	Listen Here!	Concord Picante	2005	
2005?	George Duke	Duke	Big Piano Music (BPM)	2005	
2005?	Chris Botti	To Love Again: The Duets	Columbia	2005	
2005–08	Chick Corea	Chillin' In Chelan	Stretch	2007	Japan-only release
2005–10	Pat Metheny	Day Trip	Nonesuch	2008	
2006–05, 2006–06	Joshua Redman	Back East	Nonesuch	2007	
2006–07	Chris Botti	Italia	Columbia	2007	
2006–12	McCoy Tyner	Quartet	McCoy Tyner Music	2007	
2007–04	Bruce Hornsby	Camp Meeting	Legacy Recordings	2007	
2007?	Queen Latifah	Trav'lin' Light	Verve	2007	
2008?	David Sanborn	Here and Gone	Decca	2008	
2008?	George Duke	Dukey Treats	Big Piano Music (BPM)	2008	
2008–10, 2008–11	Chick Corea and John McLaughlin	Five Peace Band Live	Concord	2009	Live. Grammy Award for Best Jazz Instrumental Album.
2009–05	James Carter	Heaven on Earth	Half Note	2009	
2011–10	Ulysses Owens Jr.	Unanimous	Criss Cross Jazz	2012	
2011–03, 2011–11	Paul McCartney	Kisses on the Bottom	Hear Music	2012	
2010–10; 2012–12	Chick Corea	Trilogy	Concord	2013	Grammy Award for Best Jazz Instrumental Album
2013?	George Duke	DreamWeaver	Big Piano Music (BPM)	2013	
2014–02	Joseph Tawadros	Permission to Evaporate	Joseph Tawadros	2014	
2014	Diana Krall	Wallflower	Verve	2015	
2015–01	Peter Bernstein	Signs Live!	Smoke Sessions	2017	[2CD] Live
2016	Diana Krall	Turn Up the Quiet	Verve	2017	
2019–09	Joshua Redman	RoundAgain	Nonesuch	2020	
2007, 2019–09	Joshua Redman	LongGone	Nonesuch	2022	
2022–05, 2022–06	George Freeman	The Good Life	HighNote	2023	

== See also ==
- List of jazz bassists
