= Ron Blake =

American saxophonist, band leader, composer, and educator (born 1965)

- Born: September 7, 1965 (age 61); US Virgin Islands
- Genres: Mainstream jazz Post bop Hard bop Rock; Soul; Blues
- Occupation: Musician
- Instruments: Saxophones, flute
- Labels: Mack Avenue, Tahmun Records
- Website: ronblakemusic.com

Ron Blake (born September 7, 1965) is an American saxophonist, band leader, composer, and music educator.

== Biography ==
Born in the Virgin Islands, he attended Northwestern University, and now lives in New York City. Blake began studying guitar at the age of eight and turned to the saxophone when he was 10 years old. He taught at the University of South Florida before moving to New York, where he spent five years in trumpeter Roy Hargrove's quintet, and seven years in flugelhornist Art Farmer's group. He attended the Interlochen Arts Academy. He completed a master's degree at NYU in 2010. Blake co-founded the 21st Century Band and the Tahmun record label with Dion Parson in 1998. He is a member of NBC's Saturday Night Live Band, and the Grammy award-winning Christian McBride Big Band. He is a professor of Jazz Studies at The Juilliard School. He has more than sixty credits on his discography as a sideman and continues to work as a performer.

== As leader ==
- Up Front and Personal (Tahmun, 2000)
- Lest We Forget (Mack Avenue, 2003)
- Sonic Tonic (Mack Avenue, 2005)
- Shayari (Mack Avenue, 2008)
- Mistaken Identity (7ten33 Productions, 2023)
- Scratch Band (7ten33 Productions, 2025)

== As co-leader ==
- 4-Sight (Encoded Music, 1998)
- 21st Century (Tahmun, 2000)

== As sideman or featured artist ==
With Bobby Broom

- Waitin' and Waitin' (Criss Cross, 1996)

With David Byrne and St. Vincent

- Love This Giant (4AD, 2012)

With Marc Cary

- Cary On (Enja, 1995)
- Listen (Arabesque, 1997)
- The Antidote (Arabesque, 1998)

With Joey DeFrancesco

- Organic Vibes (Concord, 2006)

With Cucu Diamantes

- Cuculand (Fun Machine, 2009)

With Denise Donatelli

- When Lights Are Low (Savant, 2010)

With Kat Edmonson

- Way Down Low (Spinnerette, 2012)

With Art Farmer

- The Company I Keep (Arabesque, 1994) with Tom Harrell
- The Meaning of Art (Arabesque, 1995)
- Silk Road (Arabesque, 1997)

With Tia Fuller

- Healing Space (Mack Avenue, 2007)

With Tobias Gebb & Unit 7

- Free At Last (Yummyhouse, 2009)

With Benny Golson

- Remembering Clifford (Milestone, 1998)
- Brown Immortal (Keystone, 2005)

With Benito Gonzalez

- Circles (Furthermore, 2010)

With Roy Hargrove

- Of Kindred Souls (Novus, 1993)
- With the Tenors of Our Time (Verve, 1994)
- Approaching Standards (Novus, 1994)
- Family (Verve, 1995)

With Morgan James

- Hunter (Epic, 2014)

With Sean Jones

- Gemini (Mack Avenue, 2005)

With Cornelius Claudio Kreusch & Black Mud Sound

- Scoop (Act Music + Vision, 1998)

With Steve Kroon

- Señor Kroon (Pony Canyon, 2002)

With Oliver Lake Big Band

- Cloth (Passin' Thru, 2001)

With Axel Tosca Laugart

- Axel Tosca Laugart (Alfi, 2016)

With Ric Mandell

- A Road Less Traveled (HandGame, 2002)

With Armin Marmalejo

- Boarding Pass (Igmod, 1997)

With Christian McBride

- Sci-Fi (Verve, 2002)
- Vertical Vision (Warner Bros., 2003)
- Live at Tonic (Ropeadope, 2006)
- Conversations with Christian (Mack Avenue, 2011)
- The Good Feeling (Mack Avenue, 2012)
- Bringin' It (Mack Avenue, 2017)

With Jorge Moreno

- Moreno (WEA International, 2001)

With Meshell Ndegeocello

- The Spirit Music Jamia: Dance of the Infidel (Shenachie, 2005)

With Nicole

- Viaje Infinito (Maverick, 2001)

With Organissimo

- Waiting for the Boogaloo Sisters (Big O, 2003)

With Dion Parson and 21st Century Band

- People Music (Tahmun, 2006)
- Live at Dizzy's Club Coca-Cola, Vol. 1 (Dion Parsons Records, 2010)
- Live at Dizzy's Club Coca Cola, Vol. 2 (Jazzheads, 2013)
- St. Thomas (Dion Parsons Records, 2015)

With Clarence Penn

- Penn's Landing (Criss Cross, 1996)
- Play-Penn (Criss Cross, 2001)

With Katy Perry

- Prism (Capitol, 2013)

With Tony Reedus

- Minor Thang (Criss Cross, 1995)

With Diane Reeves

- Quiet After the Storm (Blue Note, 1995)

With Justin Robinson

- The Challenge (Arabesque, 1998)

With Reuben Rogers

- The Things I Am (Renwick, 2006)

With Matthew Rybecki

- Driven (Accession, 2011)

With Stephen Scott

- The Beautiful Thing (Verve, 1996)

With Terell Stafford

- Centripetal Force (Candid, 1997)

With Mary Stallings

- Live at the Village Vanguard (MAXJAZZ, 2001)

With Sunny Sumter

- Rite of Passage (Jordan, 2001)

With Jimmy Smith

- Damn! (Verve, 1996)

With Steve Turre

- Sanyas (Smoke Sessions, 2024)

With Teraesa Vinson

- Opportunity Please Knock (Amplified Music, 2004)

With Rodney Whitaker

- Ballads And Blues - The Brooklyn Session (Criss Cross, 1998)
- Hidden Kingdom (DIW, 1998)
- Winter Moon (Sirocco Jazz, 2004)

With Pharez Whitted

- Mysterious Cargo (Motown, 1996)

With Vanessa Williams

- Sweetest Days (PolyGram, 1994)

With Gerald Wilson

- In My Time (Mack Avenue, 2005)
- Monterey Moods (Mack Avenue, 2007)
- Detroit (Mack Avenue, 2009)
- Legacy (Mack Avenue, 2011)

With Anthony Wonsey

- Open The Gates (Criss Cross, 1998)

With Yerba Buena!

- President Alien (Razor & Tie, 2003)
- Island Life (Razor & Tie, 2005)

With Dave Matthews Band

- Late in the Evening (Simon, 1980), Guest appearance, Huntington Bank Pavilion at Northerly Island, Chicago, IL, July 7, 2023
