= Mack Avenue Records =

Jazz music producer based in Detroit Michigan

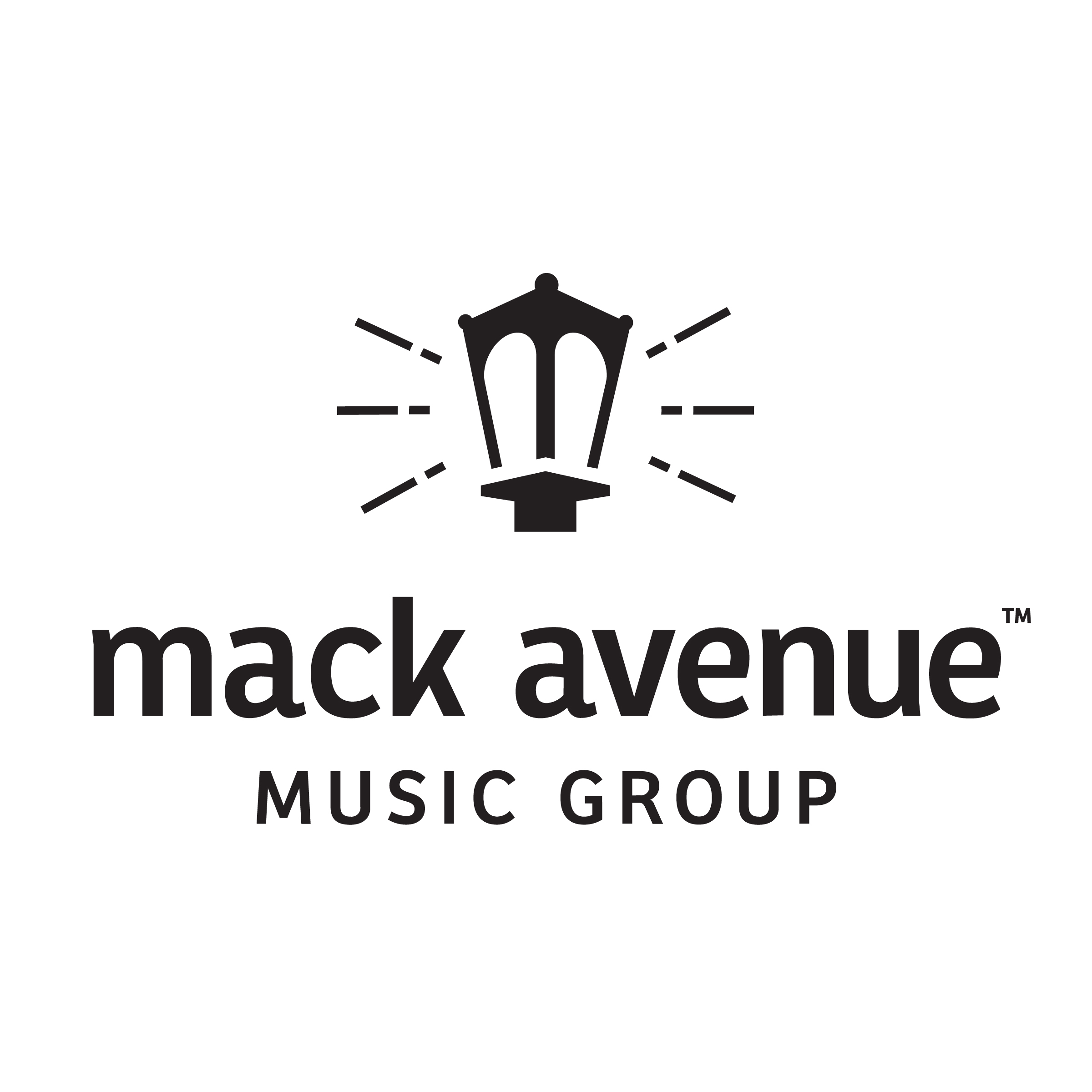
- Founded: 1999
- Founder: Gretchen Valade
- Genre: Jazz
- Country of origin: U.S.
- Location: Grosse Pointe Farms, Michigan
- Official website: www.mackavenue.com

Mack Avenue Records is an independent record label in Grosse Pointe Farms, Michigan.

== Background ==
Mack Avenue was founded in 1999 by Gretchen Carhartt Valade, a jazz fan and chair of the American apparel company Carhartt. The company is a sponsor of the Detroit Jazz Festival, to which Gretchen Valade donated $15 million in 2006.

Early Mack recording artists included Terry Gibbs, Oscar Castro-Neves, and George Shearing. Over time Mack Avenue signed veteran jazz musicians such as Gary Burton, Kevin Eubanks, Stanley Jordan, Christian McBride, Gerald Wilson, and the Yellowjackets. Acquisitions made in 2008 expanded the label's catalogue into additional genres, such as the blues, gospel, and rhythm and blues (R&B), with Jonathan Butler, Brian Bromberg, Rick Braun, Richard Elliot, and Kenny Rankin. Mack Avenue's recording artists have earned multiple Grammy awards and nominations.

In 2016, Mack Avenue expanded its catalog when it acquired MAXJAZZ.
