= Dan Chmielinski =

American jazz bassist (born 1993)

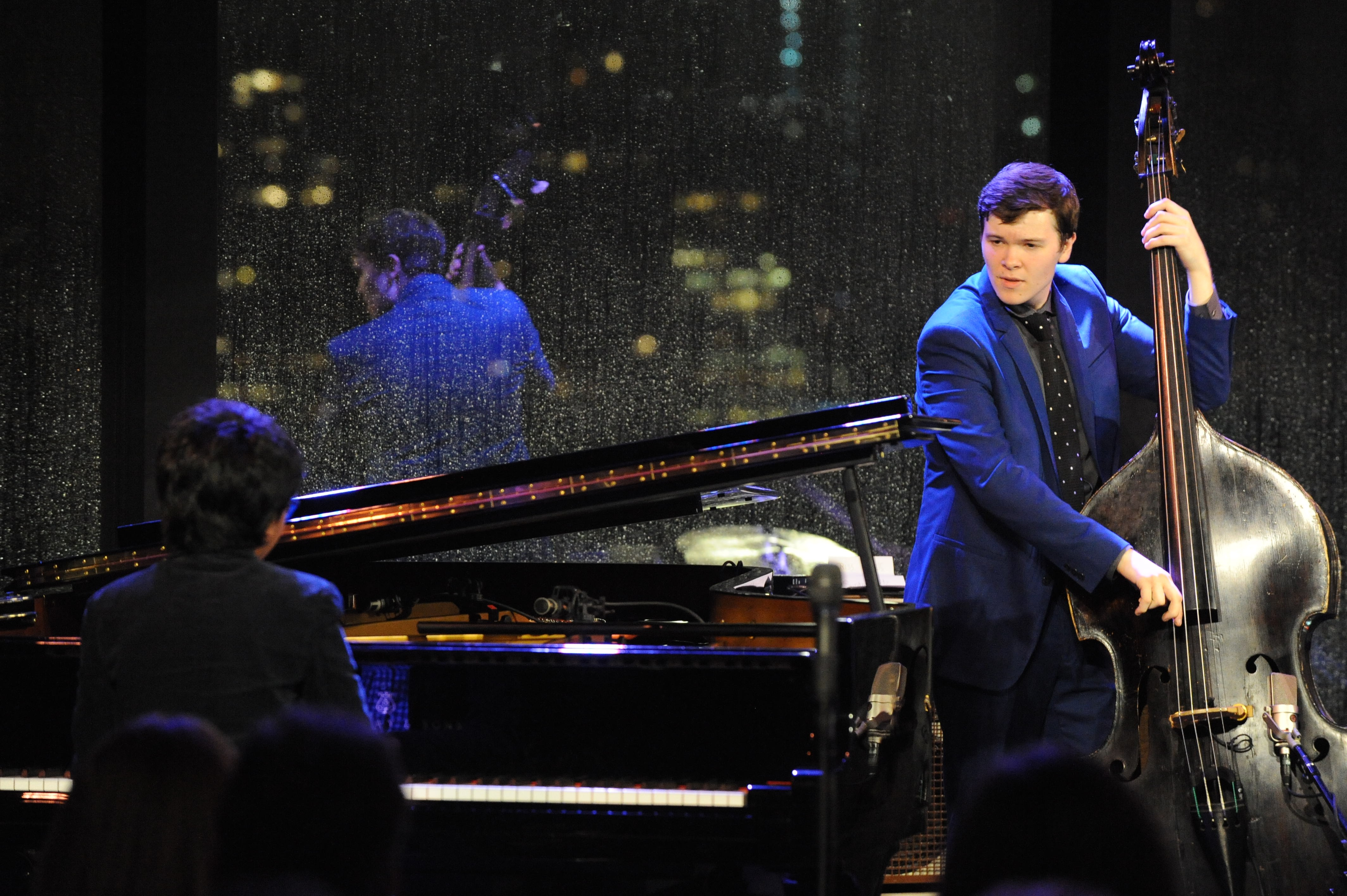
- Dan Chmielinski playing with Joey Alexander at Dizzy's Club Coca-Cola

Background information
- Also known as: Chimy (shim'-ee)
- Born: December 28, 1993 (age 32)
- Origin: Chicago, Illinois
- Genre: Jazz
- Occupation: Musician
- Instruments: acoustic bass, synthesizer
- Website: chimyonthebass.com

Dan Chmielinski, also known as "Chimy" (shim'-ee), (born December 28, 1993) is an American jazz bassist, synthesist and composer.

== Biography ==
=== Early life ===
Raised in Glenview, Illinois, Chmielinski began playing bass at age three, initially utilizing a toddler-sized acoustic bass his parents created using a half-size cello with bass guitar strings. He attended Glenbrook South High School in Glenview, Illinois. He completed both undergraduate and graduate studies in music at the Juilliard School in New York City.

=== Musical career ===
He has worked extensively as a member of pianist Joey Alexander's trio alongside drummer Ulysses Owens and was featured on Alexander's second album Countdown, released in September 2016. He has performed as a member of the Jazz at Lincoln Center Orchestra featuring Wynton Marsalis, and has also worked with artists including Brad Mehldau, Chase Baird, Eric Harland, Antonio Sánchez, Nir Felder, Jeff "Tain" Watts, Mark Sherman, Dan Tepfer, Steve Lyman, Sammy Miller, Bryan Carter and others.

His initial work as a bandleader focused on the ensemble Four by Four, which featured combined jazz quartet and string quartet. In mid-2018, Chmielinski formed the electro-acoustic band Circuit Kisser, featuring Electronic Wind Instrumentalist Chase Baird, keyboardist Mathis Picard and drummer Diego Ramirez.

In December 2019, Chmielinski collaborated with vocalist Martina DaSilva to release the winter holiday-inspired album A Very ChimyTina Christmas. While the album primarily featured Chmielinski and DaSilva in a duo format, several tracks incorporate individual guest artists including saxophonist Lucas Pino, guitarist Gabe Schnider, vibraphonist Joel Ross and bassist Ben Wolfe. The album encompassed ten classic standards including Wham!'s "Last Christmas" and "When You Wish Upon a Star" as well as the original composition "Diamonds and Pearls".

Chmielinski has composed music for film, including the 2016 documentary Sacred by director Thomas Lennon. He also composed for director Connor Smith's 2015 film Smoke in the Air and 2016 documentary Shakespeare at the Point. In 2017, Dan was one of 8 composers selected to participate in BMI's, “Composing for the Screen” film scoring mentorship, under the guidance of acclaimed media composer Rick Baitz.

Chmielinski plays and endorses Pirastro Eudoxa strings.

== Discography ==
=== As leader ===
Album artist	Title	Year	Label
Dan Chmielinski & Martina DaSilva	ChimyTina and Chill	2020	Independent
Dan Chmielinski & Martina DaSilva	A Very ChimyTina Christmas	2019	Outside In Music
Circuit Kisser	Faking The Moon Landing	2019	Soundsabound Records

=== As sideman ===
Album artist	Title	Year	Label
Adam Moezinia	Folk Element Trio	2021	Outside In Music
Chad Lefkowitz-Brown	Quartet Sessions	2021	La Reserve
The 8-Bit Big Band	Backwards Compatible	2021	Independent
Tony Glausi	When It All Comes Crashing Down	2021	Outside In Music
Chad LB Virtual Big Band	Quarantine Standards	2020	Independent
Chase Baird (feat. Steve Lyman, J3PO & Dan Chmielinski)	Pulsar	2020	Outside In Music
Benny Benack III & Steven Feifke	Season's Swingin' Greetings	2019	Ring Road Recordings
Joey Alexander	In A Sentimental Mood (Bonus Collection)	2019	Motema Music
Mark Sherman	My Other Voice	2019	Miles High Records
Chase Baird	A Life Between	2019	Soundsabound Records
Luke Celenza	Emanuela	2019	Independent
Evgeny Sivtsov	Zoo	2019	Rainy Days Records
Marc Cary	After The Jam: Volume 1	2018	Independent
Sam Chess	Hot Cereal	2017	Independent
Joey Alexander & Kelsea Ballerini	My Favorite Things	2016	Black River
Joey Alexander	Countdown	2016	Motema Music
Adison Evans	Hero	2016	Independent
Fatum Brothers Orchestra	Here to Say	2010	Independent
Chicago Palette	Chicago Palette	2010	Independent
