= Steve Lyman =

American drummer

- Born: January 22, 1982 (age 44)
- Origin: Salt Lake City, Utah, U.S.
- Genres: Jazz, Electronica, Rock
- Occupation: Musician
- Instrument: Drums
- Website: stevelymandrums.com

Stephen Richard Lyman (born January 22, 1982) is an American jazz drummer, composer and educator.

== Biography ==
=== Early life ===
Born in Salt Lake City, Utah, Lyman was exposed to music at an early age by his father, a classical guitarist. Lyman began to play professionally while in high school and eventually studied music at the University of Utah. He relocated to New York City in 2005 to continue his education at the New School where he began to study with drummer Ari Hoenig, whom he cites a musical influence and mentor.

=== Musical career ===
Lyman worked extensively with vocalist José James in the mid-2000s and recorded on James’ critically acclaimed album, The Dreamer.

He released his debut album Revolver in 2013. The album featured his original work as a composer alongside pianist Julian Pollack, guitarist Kenji Aihara and bassist Chris Tordini.

In early 2019, Lyman collaborated with saxophonist Chase Baird to compose, record and produce the electro-acoustic composition Pulsar, which showcased Lyman's integration complex rhythmic vocabulary with musical elements inspired by EDM and electronic music. The composition premiered via a promotional video for Istanbul Mehmet Cymbals as well as on the online drum education forum Drumeo.

He has worked with artists including Aaron Parks, Gilad Hekselman, Nir Felder, Julian Pollack, Chase Baird, Bill McHenry, George Garzone, Ralph Alessi, Logan Richardson, Jaleel Shaw, Tyshawn Sorey, Dan Tepfer, Becca Stevens and Corey Christiansen, among others.

Lyman professionally endorses for Craviotto Drum Company and Istanbul Agop Cymbals.

=== As an educator ===
Lyman taught alongside drummer Billy Hart at Montclair State University in New Jersey in 2007. In 2013, he published his first book, A New Approach to Odd-Times for Drumset, through Mel Bay Publications. He has served on the faculties of the University of Utah and Snow College and maintains an active online teaching studio.

== Discography ==
=== As leader ===
Title	Year	Label
Revolver	2013	Independent
SIGNAL TO BURNING	2026	Independent
SIGNAL TO BURNING (B-SIDES)	2026	Independent

=== As sideman ===
Album artist	Title	Year	Label
Chase Baird (feat. Steve Lyman, J3PO & Dan Chmielinski)	Pulsar	2020	Outside In Music
David Halliday	Dreamsville	2012	Lone Peak
Chase Baird	Crosscurrent	2010	Junebeat
Jose James	The Dreamer	2008	Brownswood
