= Chase Baird =

American jazz saxophonist and composer

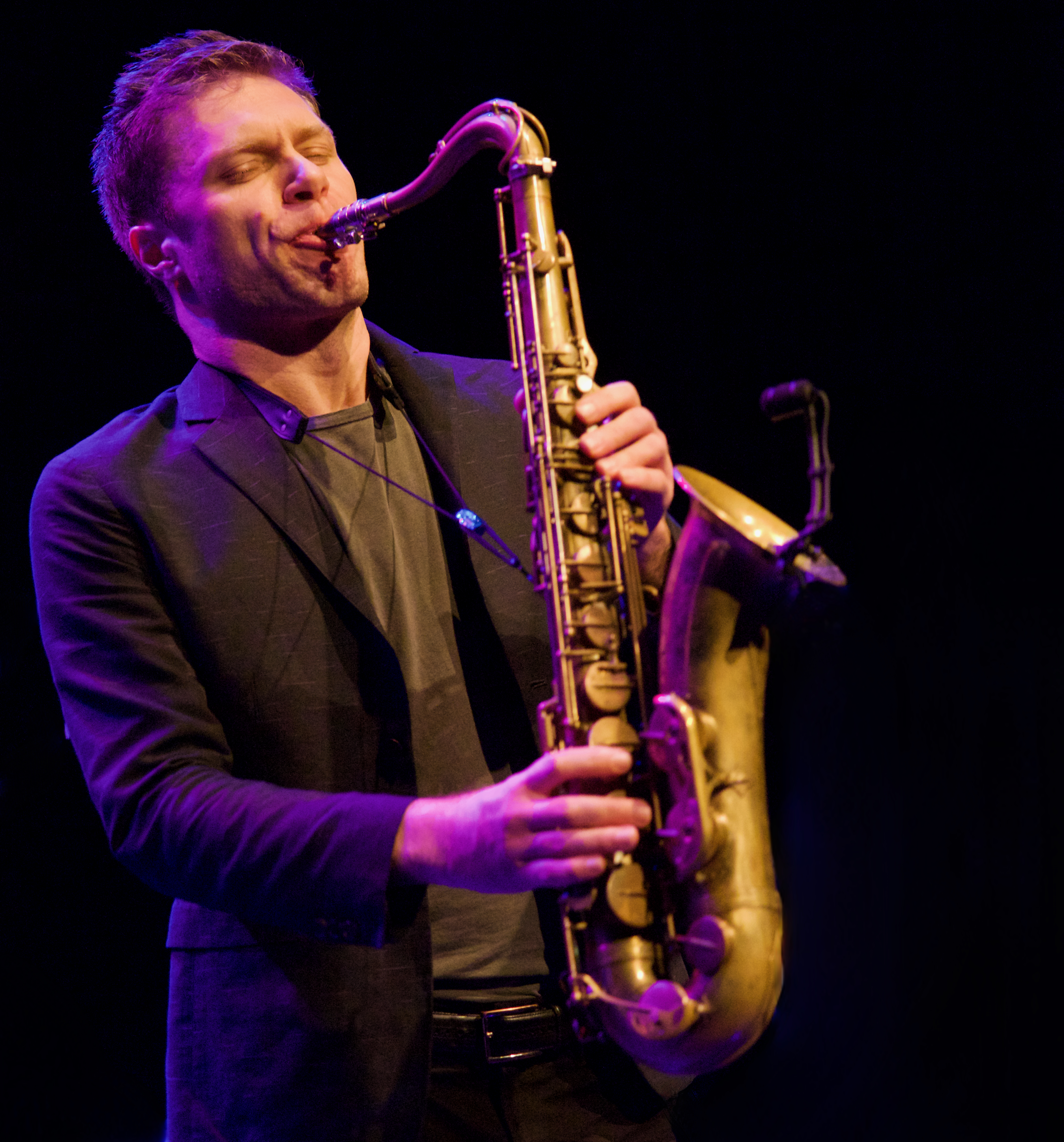

Background information
- Born: March 18, 1988 (age 38); Seattle, United States
- Genres: Jazz, pop, indie rock, electronic
- Occupations: Musician, composer, educator
- Instruments: Saxophone, EWI, guitar, piano, voice
- Label: Soundsabound Records
- Website: chasebaird.com

David "Chase" Baird (born March 18, 1988) is an American saxophonist, guitarist, wind synthesist, composer, songwriter and music educator.

== Biography ==
=== Early life ===
Baird was born in Seattle, Washington. He was introduced to music at an early age by his father, a trumpet player who played in rock bands and doubled on an eclectic collection of instruments, including saxophone, flute, Rhodes, synthesizer and percussion. His family moved to Salt Lake City, Utah, in 1996. He began to play the saxophone around age ten, and eventually studied jazz and improvisation for several years with saxophonist Alan Braufman.

During his teenage years, Baird became highly influenced by the music of saxophonist Michael Brecker. A chance encounter with drummer Jeff Hamilton inspired Baird to try to connect with Brecker directly for music lessons. Baird's family made contact via Brecker's manager and Brecker agreed to meet in person next time he traveled through Salt Lake City in early 2003. Although brief, Baird cites Brecker's mentorship around this time as influential on the trajectory of his career.

Baird's family relocated to the San Francisco Bay Area in 2004. He collaborated with other young musicians, including pianist Julian Waterfall Pollack, composer/arranger Kyle Athayde and trumpeter Billy Buss during this time.

=== 2006–present ===
Baird attended Diablo Valley College for one year, primarily studying psychology. He later transferred to California State University, Long Beach to study music, notably with saxophonists Eric Marienthal, Sal Lozano and Jay Mason. He left after two years and eventually relocated to New York City, where he enrolled at The Juilliard School (studying with Ron Blake, Steve Wilson, Joe Temperley, Frank Kimbrough, Kendall Briggs and others) and completed an undergraduate degree.

In 2009, he was featured in the soundtrack to Emancipated, a film by P.K. Ziainia with music by composer Rodrigo Denis.

Baird recorded and released his debut album, Crosscurrent, in 2010, featuring pianist Julian Waterfall Pollack, guitarist John Storie, bassist Christopher Tordini, drummer Steve Lyman and percussionist James Yoshizawa.

Baird joined drummer Antonio Sánchez's group Migration in 2018, recording both saxophone and Electronic Wind Instrument on the group's critically acclaimed album Lines in the Sand. He also co-led the band Venture, alongside drummer Mike Clark, vibraphonist Mark Sherman and electric bassist Felix Pastorius. The group released their first album Life Cycle on Ropeadope Records.

Baird released A Life Between, his second album as a leader in August 2019. The recording features Brad Mehldau, Antonio Sánchez, Nir Felder and Dan Chmielinski. He collaborated with drummer Steve Lyman to compose, record and produce the electro-acoustic composition Pulsar, later released in July 2020.

He has performed or recorded with artists Chaka Khan, Bill Champlin, Matthew Morrison, Jakob Dylan, Diana Degarmo, Chloe Agnew and Morgan James. He has also worked with jazz and fusion artists including Chris Botti, Mike Stern, Antonio Farao, Aaron Parks, Thana Alexa, Dennis Chambers, Gary Grainger, Gene Perla, Dan Tepfer, Thomas Dawson, Victor Wooten, Keith Carlock, Circuit Kisser and the Mingus Big Band, among others. His work as a featured soloist with the Kyle Athayde Dance Party has garnered over one million views on YouTube.

Chase additionally plays guitar, acoustic and electric, with his sister Christine Baird and her band Rocky Mountain Soul.

== Selected discography ==
=== As leader ===
- Pulsar (Outside In Music, 2020) with Steve Lyman, J3PO (Julian Pollack) & Dan Chmielinski
- A Life Between (Soundsabound Records, 2019) with Brad Mehldau, Nir Felder, Dan Chmielinski and Antonio Sanchez
- Crosscurrent (Junebeat Records, 2010) with Julian Pollack, John Storie, Chris Tordini, Steve Lyman and James Yoshizawa

=== As co-leader ===
- Life Cycle (Ropeadope Records, 2018) with Mark Sherman, Felix Pastorius and Mike Clark

=== As sideman ===
- Trail Loop –Enrico Solazzo with Roberto Gatto and Chase Baird (Jazz AG Records, 2025)
- The Animal Situation – Thomas Dawson (Independent, 2022)
- Michael & Me – Jeremy Green with Victor Wooten, Keith Carlock and Chase Baird (Independent, 2020)
- Force Tranquille – Jean-marie Corrois (Independent, 2020)
- Faking The Moon Landing – Circuit Kisser (Soundsabound Records, 2019)
- Lines in the Sand – Antonio Sanchez & Migration (CAM Jazz, 2018)
- Language of Sound and Spirit – Joshua Maxey (Independent, 2012)
- Hunter – Morgan James (Epic, 2014)
- Celebration of Soul – Joshua Maxey (Independent, 2015)
