= Crosscurrent (Chase Baird album) =

Studio album by Chase Baird
- Released: 2010
- Genre: Jazz
- Length: 63:16
- Label: Junebeat
- Producer: David Halliday

Chase Baird chronology
Crosscurrent (2010)	A Life Between (2019)

Crosscurrent is a contemporary jazz record by saxophonist Chase Baird. It is his first album as a leader.

== Track listing ==
All tracks composed by Chase Baird; except where indicated

1. "Fifth Direction" – 5:18
2. "Crosscurrent" – 6:31
3. "Infinite Motion" – 6:22
4. "What's New?" (Bob Haggart and Johnny Burke) – 7:16
5. "Lunessence" – 6:47
6. "The Traveler" – 9:05
7. "Cascade" – 6:36
8. "Dusk" – 6:14
9. "All of You" (Cole Porter) – 9:07

== Personnel ==
- Chase Baird – tenor saxophone
- Julian Waterfall Pollack – piano, keyboards
- John Storie – guitar
- Chris Tordini – acoustic bass
- Steve Lyman – drums
- James Yoshizawa – percussion
