= A Life Between =

Studio album by Chase Baird
- Released: August 2019
- Recorded: January 2018
- Studios: Sear Sound, New York City
- Genre: Jazz
- Length: 68:24
- Label: Soundsabound Records
- Producer: Chase Baird

Chase Baird chronology
Crosscurrent (2010)	A Life Between (2019)	Pulsar (2020)

A Life Between is the second studio album by saxophonist and composer Chase Baird. It features pianist Brad Mehldau, guitarist Nir Felder, bassist Dan Chmielinski and drummer Antonio Sanchez. Extensive liner notes, outlining both Baird's personal and musical history, were authored by Ethan Kogan.

== Reception ==
Jazziz Magazine (in a review by Asher Wolf) stated: "Chase Baird’s new studio ensemble functions like an ecosystem. The New York-based saxophonist released his second LP, A Life Between, with the star-studded lineup of pianist Brad Mehldau, drummer Antonio Sanchez, bassist Dan Chmielinski and guitarist Nir Felder. There are no overlapping personnel from his 2010 debut Crosscurrent. Although this iteration of Baird’s group may be new, their interplay teems with life... Overall, each musician’s razor-sharp responsiveness allows for cohesive, well-shaped arrangements without relying on the anchor of rote repetition."

== Track listing ==
All tracks composed by Chase Baird; except where indicated:

1. "Ripcord" – 9:18
2. "As You Are" – 7:14
3. "Reactor" – 9:16
4. "Dream Knows No End" – 9:05
5. "Wait and See" – 6:38
6. "A Life Between" – 6:44
7. "In The Wake (of Urban Overdrive)" – 12:16
8. "Im wunderschönen Monat Mai" (Robert Schumann) – 7:53

== Personnel ==
- Chase Baird – tenor saxophone
- Brad Mehldau – piano
- Nir Felder – guitar
- Dan Chmielinski – acoustic bass
- Antonio Sanchez – drums
