= Craviotto =

Craviotto may refer to

== People ==
- Néstor Craviotto (born 1963), Argentine football manager and former player
- Saúl Craviotto (born 1984), Spanish sprint canoer

== Other uses ==
- Craviotto drums, a drum kit manufacturing company based in Watsonville, California
