= Bill Cunliffe =

American jazz pianist and composer

- Born: William Henry Cunliffe Jr. Andover, Massachusetts, U.S.
- Genres: Jazz\Classical crossover\Sacred
- Occupations: Musician, bandleader, composer, arranger, educator
- Instrument: Piano
- Years active: 1978–present
- Website: billcunliffe.com

William Henry Cunliffe Jr. (born June 26, 1956) is an American Grammy Award winning jazz pianist and composer and professor at California State University, Fullerton.

== Early life ==
Cunliffe was born in Andover, Massachusetts. He discovered music at an early age, with particular emphasis on classical music as well as jazz-oriented music from the 1960s and 1970s: "My mother was a good pianist...I started just copying little things that I would hear my mom play and I would sit next to her and listen.

Cunliffe described himself as having been drawn to "anything with hip harmony in it" with great melodies, and he loved listening to The 5th Dimension, Burt Bacharach, and Herb Alpert. He attended Phillips Academy and graduated in 1974 in the school's first co–educational class. In college, he performed rock and roll at the Prince Spaghetti House in Saugus, Massachusetts. He attended Wesleyan University for several years. During this time, a friend introduced him to a record by Oscar Peterson, and after listening to this record, Cunliffe became a "jazz player overnight." While in school, he considered careers in medicine and psychology, but in his junior year, he decided that "music was it."

After graduating from Duke University, he received his master's degree from the Eastman School of Music.

== Career ==
For two and a half years, Cunliffe taught music at Central State University in Wilberforce, Ohio. He then toured as pianist and arranger with the Buddy Rich Big Band. He returned to Southern Ohio for a few years, where he was the "house pianist" at the Greenwich Tavern in Cincinnati, playing with Woody Shaw, Joe Henderson, Freddie Hubbard, Benny Golson and James Moody. In 1989 he moved to Los Angeles, and shortly after that won the 1989 Thelonious Monk Jazz Piano Competition, which was judged by pianists Hal Galper, Ahmad Jamal, and Barry Harris. Cunliffe worked occasionally with Buell Neidlinger's group "Thelonious," and in 1990 joined the Clayton Hamilton Jazz Orchestra, and the Clayton Brothers Quartet, recording a number of albums with them. He also worked in duo with jazz flutist Holly Hofmann, touring and recording on the Capri and Azica labels with her, notably, the session "Live at Birdland," with the great bassist Ray Brown.

Cunliffe made three jazz albums for Warner/Discovery Records which achieved recognition in nationwide jazz polls, including Bill in Brazil during a stint in Rio de Janeiro that was well received. He recorded several albums for Azica Records, including Satisfaction, a solo piano outing, Live at Rocco, with his sextet, and Partners in Crime, a Hammond B3 session with guitarist Jim Hershman and drummer Jeff Hamilton. In 2000, he recorded a sextet session of Earl Zindars' music, and in 2001 Cunliffe documented his working trio of ten years with Live at Bernies, which was released on both CD and vinyl. Cunliffe has been a member of LaBarbera's quintet featuring saxophonist Bob Sheppard and trumpeter Clay Jenkins virtually since its formation in the early 1990s.

In 2003, Cunliffe recorded his Latin octet Imaginacion, on Torii, which reached No. 2 in nationwide radio jazz charts. He is a Baldwin Pianos artist, and was Marian McPartland's guest on her famed Piano Jazz radio show in 1998.

Cunliffe led the Resonance Jazz Orchestra at the Playboy Jazz Festival in Hollywood, California, in June 2011. He accompanied pianist Marian Petrescu in selections from the Resonance Jazz Orchestra Plays Tribute to Oscar Peterson CD.

In the 1990s, Cunliffe wrote a number of educational publications. His book Jazz Keyboard Toolbox was published by Alfred Publications and became a standard reference in jazz. Next came an educational DVD and book on beginning blues piano called MAX Blues Keyboard, also for Alfred. He then published Jazz Inventions for Keyboard, short pieces in the style of the Chopin Preludes and Bach Inventions, with an accompanying audio CD. More recently, he published Uniquely Familiar, a book of through-composed arrangements of jazz standards, followed by a similar collection entitled "Uniquely Christmas."

Cunliffe has composed numerous works for big band, orchestra, chamber groups, and choir, and has been performed by many orchestras, including the Cincinnati Pops Orchestra, the Illinois Philharmonic, the Reading Symphony, the Rio Hondo Symphony Orchestra, the Manhattan School of Music Symphony, the Temple University and Cal State Fullerton Symphonies, and the Henry Mancini Institute Orchestra. He has written for television, and for film, including the Kareem Abdul-Jabbar-produced film, On the Shoulders of Giants (2011).

Cunliffe's concerto for trumpet and orchestra entitled fourth stream... La Banda (2010) was nominated for a Grammy in that year, and was premiered by Terell Stafford and the Temple University Symphony Orchestra, conducted by Luis Biava, at Verizon Hall in Philadelphia, and at Alice Tully Hall in New York City. His three-movement piano concerto Overture, Waltz and Rondo, for piano and chamber orchestra was inspired both by jazz and by the music of Wolfgang Amadeus Mozart; this piece was also nominated for a Grammy in 2012. Cunliffe composed a tuba concerto in 2011 for Los Angeles studio and orchestral tubist Jim Self. He also recorded a piano and tuba version of the piece; the two versions are coupled on the Metre Records release. Temple University commissioned another concerto from him in late 2012; he took a chamber piece that he had written in 2004 based on Brazilian themes, and expanded it into a three movement saxophone concerto, which he recorded in Philadelphia in 2013 with Biava, the Temple orchestra, and the great saxophonist Dick Oatts. Cunliffe's Symphony #1, Hearts Reaching Upward premiered in 2013 by trumpeter Kye Palmer, and the Cal State Fullerton Wind Ensemble.

== Teaching ==
Cunliffe is Professor of Music at California State University Fullerton, where he was honored as "Distinguished Faculty Member" in 2010. In addition, he has taught at such institutions as Central State University, Musicians Institute in Hollywood, California State University, Northridge, the University of Southern California, and Temple University.

He has conducted numerous workshops and clinics as well. Ongoing residencies include the Skidmore Jazz Institute and the Vail Jazz Workshop. In 2010, he made a DVD teaching beginning jazz and blues piano. He is composer-in-residence at All Saints Episcopal Church, in Pasadena, California. He composes and performs with his trio, big band, and Latin jazz group Imaginacion.

== Awards ==
Cunliffe won the 2010 Grammy Award for Best Instrumental Arrangement of Oscar Peterson's "West Side Story Medley". In 2006, he was nominated for a Grammy award for his jazz arrangement of the Steely Dan song "Do It Again". When he was a student at Eastman, he received two awards from DownBeat magazine for arranging and composing.

In 1989, he won the Thelonious Monk International Jazz Piano Award. He received stipends from the National Endowment for the Arts. He won a grant from the New Zealand School of Music and the Rodger Fox Big Band of New Zealand released an album of Cunliffe's jazz orchestra compositions. In 2005, he won the Philadelphia Jazz Composer competition sponsored by the American Composer Federation. In the 1990s, he was nominated for three Emmys for best original song for the television soap operas Another World and Guiding Light.

== Books ==
- Jazz Keyboard Toolbox, Alfred Publications (2000, ISBN 978-0739007266)
- Jazz Piano Inventions, Alfred Publications (2005)
- MAX Blues Keyboard, Alfred Publications (2004)
- Uniquely Familiar, Alfred Publications (2010)
- Uniquely Christmas, Alfred Publications (2012)

== Discography ==
Year recorded	Title	Label	Notes
2021	TRIO	Le Coq	John Patitucci, bass; Vinnie Colaiuta, drums; Bill Cunliffe, piano
2019	Christmas in the Dog House	Night is Alive	Bill Cunliffe, piano, Ralph Moore, saxophone, Dave Robaire, bass, Marvin "Smitty" Smith, drums
2019	Sunrise Over Molokai	Metre	Bill Cunliffe, piano, Bruce Hamada, bass, Darryl Pellegrini, drums
2018	Cabin in the Sky	Height Advantage	Hendrik Meurkens, harmonica, with Bill Cunliffe, piano
2015	Border Widow's Lament	Night is Alive	Bill Cunliffe, piano, Tim Horner, drums, Martin Wind, bass
2015	Playground Swing	Metre	solo and duo piano with percussionist Brad Dutz.
2014	Nostalgia in Corcovado	BMC&D	with saxophonist Dick Oatts and the Temple University Symphony Orchestra, conducted by Luis Biava
2013	River Edge, New Jersey	Azica	Trio, with Martin Wind (bass), Tim Horner (drums)
2012	Concerto for Tuba and Orchestra	Metre	with Jim Self (tuba), the Hollywood Ensemble, conducted by Bill Cunliffe
2012	Overture, Waltz and Rondo	BCM&D	for trumpet, piano and orchestra, with Terell Stafford, trumpet, and the Temple University Symphony, Luis Biava conducting
2012	The L.A. Sessions	Miles High Records	with Mark Sherman (principal, vibes), John Chiodini (guitar), and Charles Ruggiero (drums)
2011	That Time of Year	Metre	Most tracks solo piano; one track duo, with Denise Donatelli (vocals) added
2010	Fourth Stream, La Banda	BCM&D	for trumpet, jazz ensemble and orchestra, with Terell Stafford, trumpet, and the Temple University Symphony, Luis Biava conducting
2010	Three's Company	Capri	Some tracks duo, with Holly Hofmann (flute); some tracks trio, with Terell Stafford (trumpet), Ken Peplowski (clarinet), Regina Carter (violin), Alvester Garnett (drums) added separately
2008	The Blues and The Abstract Truth, Take 2	Resonance	with septet featuring Bob Sheppard, trumpeter Kye Palmer, and drummer Mark Ferber
2008	Transformation	Metre	with the choir of All Saints Church, Pasadena, James Walker, director
2006	Romantic Fantasy	unreleased	with orchestra directed by Jeffrey Schindler
2005	Imaginación	Torii	Tentet, with Kyle Palmer and Bobby Shew (trumpet), Bruce Paulson, Arturo Velasco (trombone), Bob Sheppard (tenor sax, flute), Rene Camacho (bass), Ramon Banda (drums, percussion), Jose de Leon and Jose "Papo" Rodriguez (percussion)
2003	Just Duet volume 2	Azica	Duo, with Holly Hofmann (flute)
2003	How My Heart Sings	Torii	Most tracks sextet, with Bobby Shew (trumpet, flugelhorn), Bruce Paulson (trombone), Bob Sheppard (soprano sax, alto sax, tenor sax, clarinet, flute, alto flute), Jeff D'Angelo (bass), Joe LaBarbera (drums); two tracks septet, with Justin Ray (flugelhorn) added
2003	It's About love	Torii	With Gary Foster (alto sax), Jeff D'Angelo (bass), Tim Pleasant (drums)
2002	Warriors	T-Bones	With Rodger Fox Big Band
2001	Live at Bernie's	Groove Note	Trio, with Darek Oles (bass), Joe LaBarbera (drums); in concert
2001	Partners in Crime	Azica	Trio, with Jim Hershman (guitar), Jeff Hamilton (drums)
2000	Live at Rocco	Azica	Most tracks sextet, with Chuck Manning (tenor sax), Clay Jenkins (trumpet), Alexander Iles (trombone), Jeff D'Angelo (bass), Joe LaBarbera (drums); some tracks septet, with Holly Hofmann (flute) added; in concert
1998	Satisfaction	Azica	Solo piano
1998	Bill Plays Bud	Naxos	With Ralph Moore (tenor sax), Dave Carpenter (bass), Joe LaBarbera (drums), Papo Rodriguez (percussion)
1997	Just Duet	Azica	Most tracks duo, with Holly Hofmann (flute); one track trio, with Mark Libby (percussion) added
1993	A Paul Simon Songbook	Discovery	With Thom Rotella (guitar), Gerald Albright (sax)
1995	Bill in Brazil	Discovery	with Oscar Castro Neves, Alex Acuna, Nico Assumpcao, Paulinho Da Costa
1994	A Rare Connection	Discovery	With Bob Sheppard (tenor sax, bass clarinet), Clay Jenkins (trumpet), Bruce Paulson (trombone), Dave Carpenter (bass), Peter Erskine (drums), Kurt Rasmussen (percussion)

== Awards and nominations ==
Year	Result	Award	Category	Project	Notes
2013	Nominated	NAACP Image Awards	Outstanding Album, Outstanding Group or Duo Collaboration	On the Shoulders of Giants - The Soundtrack	
2012	Nominated	Grammy Award	Best Instrumental Composition	Overture, Waltz and Rondo	
2011	Nominated	Grammy Award	Best Instrumental Composition	"Fourth stream...La Banda"	
2010	Won	Grammy Award	Arrangement	"West Side Story Medley"	
2006	Nominated	Grammy Award	Arrangement	"Do It Again"	
2005	Won	Kimmel Jazz Center Award	Best Composition	"El Optimista"	
2003	Nominated	Grammy Award	Arrangement	"Angel Eyes" written for Alan Kaplan (trombone) and his Orchestra	
1990s	Nominated	Emmy	Best Original Song		
1990s	Nominated	Emmy	Best Original Song		(two nominations in 1990s)
1989	Won	Thelonious Monk International Jazz Piano Award			$10,000 prize
1981	Won	Down Beat Student Award	Best Original Composition	"Song of Solitude"	
