= Craviotto drums =

Drum kit manufacturing company

Craviotto Drum Company
- Type: Private
- Founded: 1999; 27 years ago
- Founder: John Angelo (Johnny C) Craviotto
- Headquarters: Nashville, Tennessee, United States
- Products: Drum kits
- Website: craviottodrums.com

Craviotto Drums is a drum kit manufacturing company, based in Nashville, Tennessee.

== History ==
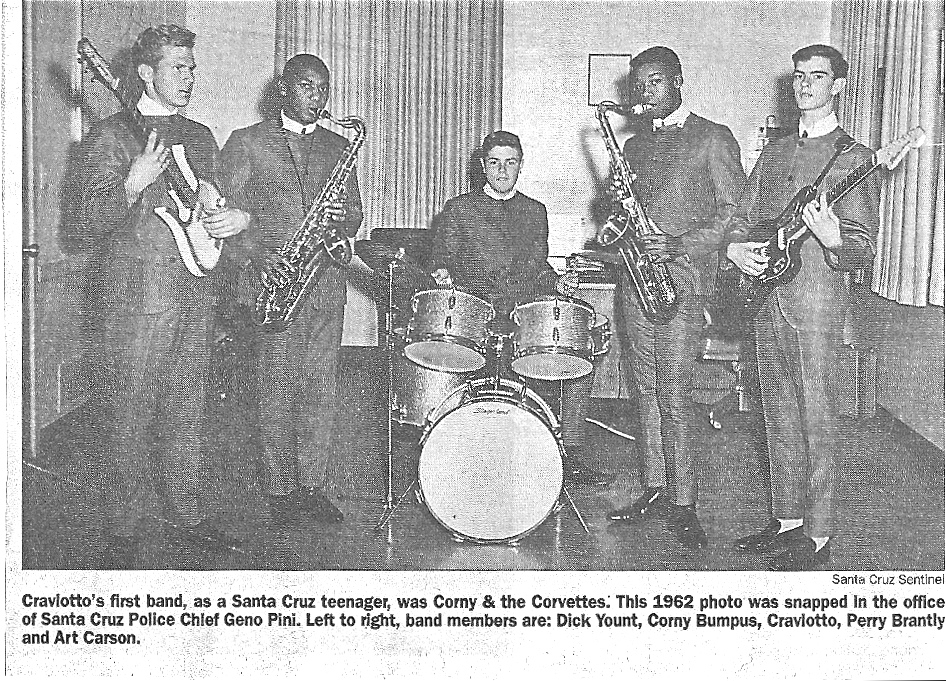
Craviotto's first band in Santa Cruz, c. 1962

Craviotto Drums founder and CEO, John “Johnny C” Craviotto was born to Italian-American parents (mother from Florence, father from Genoa) in San Francisco, CA. Johnny began playing drums at an early age and he started playing professionally as a teenager. In the 1970s, a young Johnny Craviotto started off his musical career as a professional drummer playing with artists such as Arlo Guthrie, Ry Cooder, Moby Grape, Neil Young, and Buffy St. Marie. At this time, he had also become a collector of vintage drums and developed an interest in the work of early drum builders.

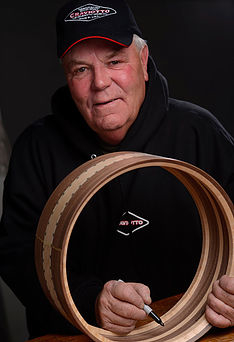
Johnny Craviotto founded the company in 1999

Craviotto had the opportunity around 1979-80 to work in a boatyard with a master boat builder. As an apprentice and helper he began applying this technique to drum shells. So with the help of the master boat builder, Johnny began making one-ply drum shells. By 1984-85, Craviotto teamed up with Billy Gibson, drummer of Huey Lewis & The News. They launched a drum company, Select Drum Company (later changed to “Solid”) Drum Company.

Craviotto developed a steam-bending technique which led to a partnership with Don Lombardi of DW Drums in 1993. For about a decade beginning in the 1990s, Craviotto’s snare drums were available as part of Drum Workshop's catalogs.

Around 1999, Craviotto started a new venture, which was to build drums from ancient, old growth wood recovered from sunken timber. He launched a limited-edition series of solid-ply drums made from 600-year-old wood rescued from the bottom of Lake Superior. These drums were adorned with hoops engraved by engraver, John Aldridge – the “Lake Superior Timeless Timber series.” Several years later, these were followed up with the Lake Superior Timeless Timber birch series of drums. followed by The Lake Superior snare drum (1999). The logs were found by divers, who were searching for a treasure, and they were blocked by these logs.

On July 15, 2016, John Angelo Craviotto died of cardiac arrest.

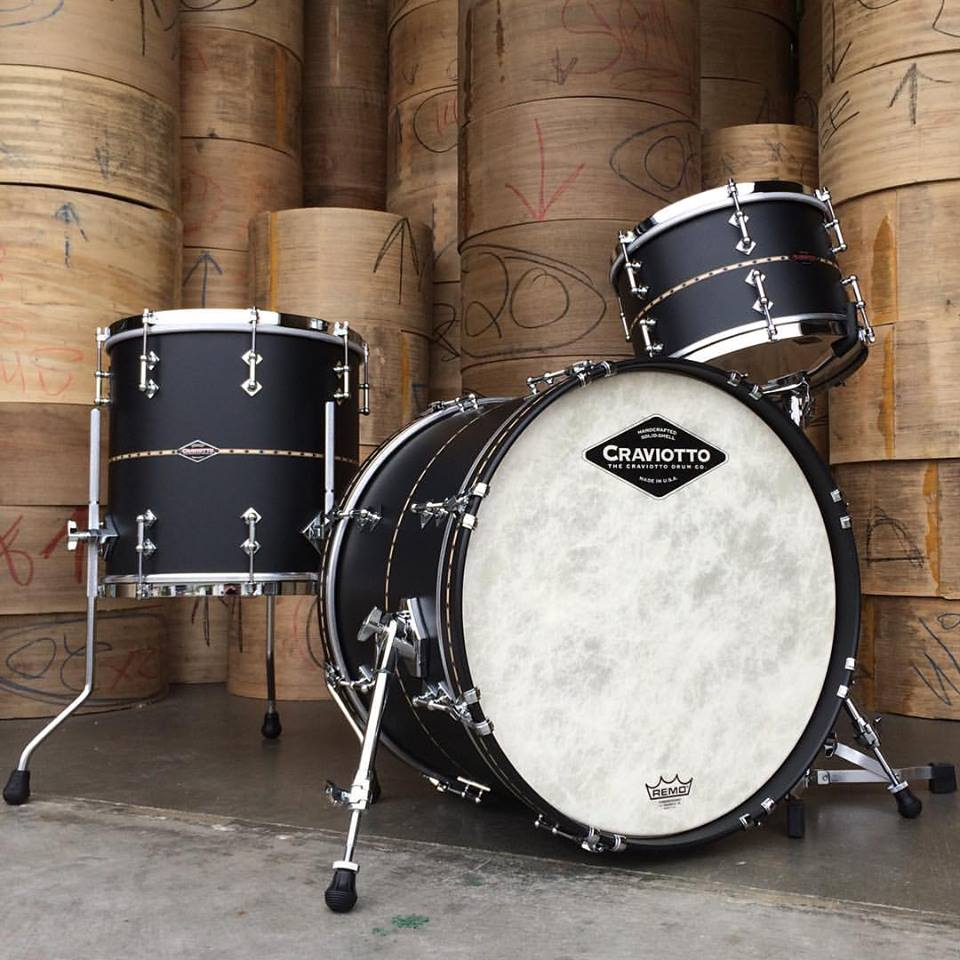
Solid Shell Maple, Matte Black Lacquer with Maple Inlay

== Collaboration with AK Drums Italy ==
In 2007, Craviotto Drum Company teamed up with Adrian Kirchler (AK Drums Italy) to introduce a series of limited edition, handmade metal snare drums. Models released were:

- 2008: Diamond Series Nickel over Brass, featuring a fully engraved, nickel-plated brass shell. (50x) 5.5x14” and (50x) 6.5x14” were produced.
- 2009: Copper Diamond Series, featured a raw copper shell. (50x) 5.5x14” and (50x) 6.5x14” were produced.
- 2012: Masters Metal Brass/Copper, featured a hybrid shell with raw brass on the batter side and raw bopper on the resonant side. (50x) 5.5x14” and (50x) 6.5x14” were produced.
- 2013: Masters Brass, featured a raw brass shell. (25x) 4.5x14”, (40x) 5.5x14”, (60x) 6.5x14” and (25x) 8x14” were produced.
- 2014: Craviotto Black Diamond, created in celebration of the Craviotto Drum Company's 10th Anniversary. This drum featured a black nickel-plated, fully engraved brass shell. (25x) 5.5x14” were produced.
- 2016: Craviotto Masters Bronze, featuring a raw bronze shell. (25x) 5.25x14” and (75x) 7x14” were produced.

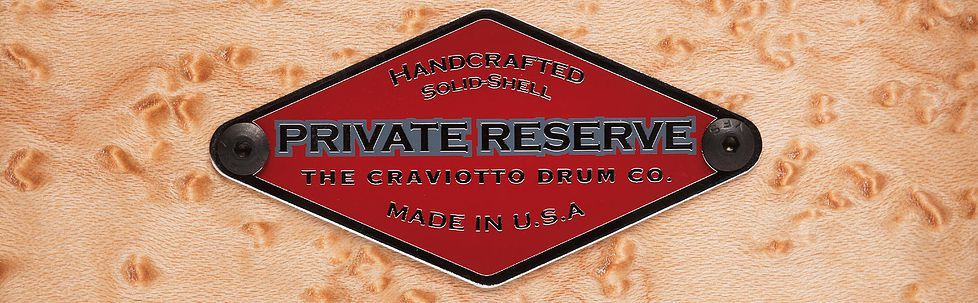
Plaque on a "Private Reserve" snare drum

== Company Relocation ==
In 2019, the company relocated to Nashville, Tennessee. The company hired Sam Bacco as the new Executive Vice President. With a history of being involved with other drum companies, Sam Bacco brought his expertise in quality drum manufacturing to Craviotto and enabled the company's aspirations to continue Johnny's legacy.

== Creation of Diamond Drums ==
In 2021, Craviotto announced the company's first subsidiary brand of ply-wood shells, Diamond Drums. This particular product was the result of Sam Bacco's involvement in the company. Also in 2021, Craviotto trademarked the phrase "Ply Shells Perfected™". These drums feature Craviotto's Maple-Ply Shells, Gold Tone Interior Sealer, Straight-Shot Edges, Marquise Lugs, and Stick-Saver Hoops. In Q2 of 2022, David Victor (Craviotto VP of Marketing, Sales, Production, Web Design, Product Design, and Customer Service) confirmed through a Craviotto Owner Facebook group that Bacco had decided to leave the company. It was later announced that the company's focus would be shifted back to Solid Shell Drums and the Diamond Drums brand would be discontinued in 2022.

== Artists ==
- Ronnie Vannucci - The Killers
- Jason McGerr - Death Cab for Cutie
- Chad Cromwell - Neil Young
- Bernie Dresel - The Brian Setzer Orchestra
- Chris McHugh - Keith Urban Garth Brooks (Nashville Session Drummer)
- Ben Wyscoki - The Fray
- Jerry Roe - Friendship Commanders (Nashville Session Drummer)
- Tom Ganter - Independent Artist Sessions & Live (German Musician)
- Justin Faulkner - Branford Marsalis
- Chris Tyrrell - Lady Antebellum
- Scott Amendola - Charlie Hunter
- Keith Prior - David Gray
- Chris Knight - LeAnn Rimes
- Matt Wilson - Arts & Crafts Matt Wilson Quartet
- Steve Sinatra - Hunter Hayes
- Jerome Jennings - Christian McBride Trio
- Billy Martin - Medeski Martin & Wood
- Carmen Intorre - Pat Martino Trio
- William Goldsmith - Sunny Day Real Estate
- Steve Lyman - Jose James, Chase Baird
- Andres Torres - La Santa Cecilia
- Justin Brown - Thundercat Amrose Akinmusire
- Les DeMerle - The Dynamic Les DeMerle Orchestra
- Shahar Haziza - (Israeli Session Artist)
- Zach Velmer - (Sound Tribe Sector 9)
- Jarrod Alexander - (Gerard Way, Los Angeles Session Artist)
- Gulli Briem Mezzoforte
- Janet Weiss Sleater Kinney
- Zach Velmer (Sound Tribe Sector 9)
- Kendrick Scott Terence Blanchard Quintet Kendrick Scott Oracle
- M J Paluch (Chicago's finest/Thr33-O)
- Sebastian Lavooy [Bella Jazz]
- Kaya Shaffer Thee Idylls / Little Silver Hearts / Don't Tell Sara
- Andrew Dunaj [Naysayin]
