= Mark Sherman (musician) =

American jazz musician

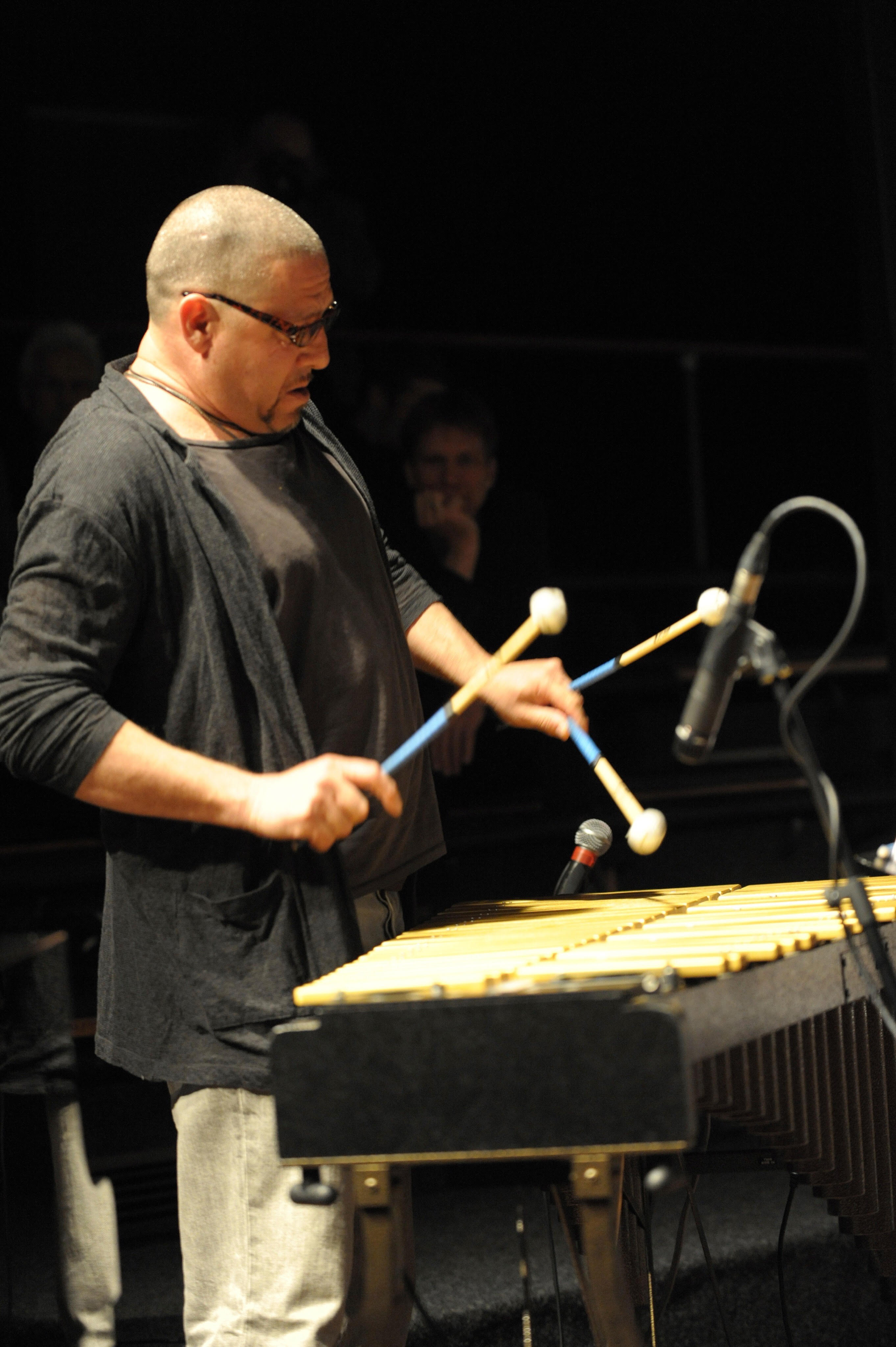

Background information
- Born: April 17, 1957 (age 69); New York City, U.S.
- Genre: Jazz
- Occupations: Musician, composer
- Instruments: Vibraphone, Piano, Percussion, Vibraphone, Drums,
- Label: Miles High Records
- Website: markshermanmusic.com

Mark Sherman (born April 17, 1957) is a jazz vibraphonist, pianist, drummer, producer, arranger, author, and classical percussionist.

Sherman has performed for some of the world's top orchestral conductors including Leonard Bernstein, Sir Georg Solti, Zubin Mehta and Herbert Von Karajan, and has worked in Jazz as a leader and sideman with Kenny Barron, Peggy Lee, Wynton Marsalis, Joe Lovano, Michael Brecker, Larry Coryell among other. He worked in Broadway musicals, and has been one of the most in-demand studio musicians, appearing on more than two dozen film and Broadway soundtracks including The Lion King. He has worked as a sideman for pop artists Michael Bolton, Natalie Cole, and Michael McDonald.

Sherman's song "Changes in My Life" became a cult hit in Asia with YouTube videos that earned more than 220 million views.

He is on the faculty of The Juilliard School, New Jersey City University He produces records under his Miles High Records label and publishes music books through his Miles High Music Books subsidiary.

== Early life ==
Sherman was born in the Bronx, New York City. His mother, Edith Gordon, was a Juilliard-trained soprano who won a full scholarship to the school at seventeen and went on to perform with the Cleveland Symphony Orchestra and the Boston Symphony Orchestra. Sherman grew up around opera and studied classical piano lessons at age eight. At fourteen he went on a four-month concert tour of Israel with his mother. As a teenager he gravitated toward jazz drumming after discovering the recordings of John Coltrane and Charlie Parker, and he later studied privately with Elvin Jones.

== Education ==
Sherman was accepted to Juilliard at age seventeen, one of only two percussion students admitted that year alongside future New York Philharmonic percussionist Daniel Druckman. He studied classical percussion for five years under Saul Goodman, who played timpani in the New York Philharmonic for fifty years, and under Buster Bailey. While at Juilliard he performed in student and freelance ensembles under conductors including Bernstein, Solti, Mehta and von Karajan, and he later recalled performing Mahler's Fifth Symphony under Bernstein's direction at Avery Fisher Hall while still a student. During the course of his career Sherman also studied with Jaki Byard, Roland Hanna, and Rohland Kohloff, among others.

== Educational career ==
Sherman is currently on the faculty of The Juilliard School, his alma mater, Sherman is an instructor in the Juilliard School jazz program since 2008.

In 2015, Sherman published his first book, ''Skills for the Poetic Language of Jazz Improvisation, with School and Career Guidance'' (Miles High Music Books), which combined instruction in jazz performance with guidance on building a career as a working musician. /> He has conducted master classes on improvisation in more than fifteen countries under the sponsorship of the Yamaha Corporation and the Pro-Mark division of the Vic Firth Company.

== Professional career ==
=== 1970s ===
While still in his teenager, Sherman played drums in a trio with pianist Kenny Kirkland. He later introduced Kirkland to fellow Juilliard student Wynton Marsalis, whom Sherman met when the two struck up an impromptu jam session in a Juilliard practice room; Marsalis subsequently hired Kirkland for his own band after Sherman recommended him. Sherman and Marsalis also performed together as substitute musicians in the Broadway pit orchestra of Sweeney Todd.

=== 1980s ===
Sherman released his first album as a leader, ''Fulcrum Point'', on Unisphere Records in 1980, featuring Mark Gould, Delmar Brown, Rael Wesley Grant and Kenwood Denard.

He spent much of the 1980s working in New York's commercial jingle and studio scene. Pianist Mike Renzi became an early mentor, connecting Sherman with Peggy Lee and other vocalists; Sherman went on to perform with Lee, Tony Bennett, Mel Tormé, Lena Horne and Ruth Brown.

In 1986, after being recommended to Columbia Records A&R executive George Butler by Wynton Marsalis, Sherman signed to the label and released his major-label debut, A New Balance, which included the single Changes in My Life. Sherman also played on albums by Joe Beck, Maureen McGovern and Peggy Lee during this period.

=== 1990s ===
Sherman continued to perform with Peggy Lee in the early 1990s, appearing on her albums in 1990 and 1993. He also began a seven-year musical relationship with guitarist Larry Coryell, producing and performing on Coryell's albums ''I'll Be Over You'' (1994) and ''Sketches of Coryell'' (1996).

Through most of the decade, Sherman remained an active studio musician, contributing to albums by Rodney Jones, Gloria Lynne, Michael Bolton, Julian Coryell, LaVerne Butler, Ruth Brown and Maureen McGovern, as well as playing on numerous film and Broadway soundtracks, including Armageddon, The Lion King, Hercules, and the Broadway productions of Footloose and Kiss of the Spider Woman.

In 1997, Sherman reemerged as a bandleader focused on vibraphone and formed Miles High Records, releasing ''High Rollin''' in 1998 and ''Spiral Staircase'' in 1999.

=== 2000s ===
Sherman ended his working relationship with Larry Coryell at the start of the decade, having appeared on three of Coryell's recordings and produced two of them; Coryell also recorded ten of Sherman's compositions during their collaboration. Sherman continued his career as a sideman, recording with Capathia Jenkins, Jennifer Holliday, Lena Horne, Ann Hampton Callaway, Tony Bennett, and Liza Minnelli, among others, and appeared on more than a dozen additional film and Broadway soundtracks, including The Last Mimzy, Failure to Launch, Miss Congeniality, Miss Congeniality 2: Armed and Fabulous, The Alamo and Two Weeks Notice.

Sherman continued to release albums under his own name on Miles High Records: ''The Motive Series'' (2004), featuring Michael Brecker; ''One Step Closer'' (2005), featuring Joe Lovano, which reached the top ten on U.S. jazz radio for twelve weeks; ''Family First'' (2007), which was the most-played jazz CD in the United States in its opening week; and Live at the Bird's Eye (2008), recorded in Basel, Switzerland, at the close of a European tour.

=== 2010s ===
Sherman released several albums during this decade, including Good Rhythm Good Vibes (2010); Explorations in Space and Time (2011, Chesky Records), featuring Lenny White and Jamey Haddad; Live at Chorus (2012); The L.A. Sessions (2012), with Bill Cunliffe on Hammond B3, John Chiodini on guitar, and Charles Ruggiero on drums; Project THEM (2013), formed with saxophonist Bob Franceschini and featuring Mitchel Forman, Martin Gjakonovski and Adam Nussbaum, which toured Europe three times; and ''Interplay'' (2015, Chesky Records) with Kenny Barron.

Sherman performed regularly in New York at venues including Dizzy's Club Coca-Cola, Smalls Jazz Club, and the Kitano, and toured Europe with a quartet, the Mark Sherman 4tet, and with a European configuration featuring Antonio Farao. He produced and performed on vocalist Laura Perlman's 2016 debut album Precious Moments on Miles High Records and arranged all but two of its tracks, the remainder arranged by pianist Bill Cunliffe, who also performed on the album alongside bassist Chris Colangelo and drummer Joe LaBarbera.

=== 2020s ===
Sherman has continued to record for Miles High Records, releasing Bright Light (2022), featuring Joe Magnarelli, Dean Johnson and Tim Horner; Third Eye Vision (2023), featuring Sam Dillon, Ugonna Okegwo and Jonathan Blake; Live at the Bird's Eye, Vol. 2 (2024), featuring Joe Magnarelli, Stephan Kurmann and Bernd Reiter; and Bop Contest (2025), his twenty-second album as a leader, featuring pianist Donald Vega, bassist Ron Carter, drummer Carl Allen and guest trumpeter Joe Magnarelli. ''Bop Contest'' marked the first time Sherman had enlisted Carter, a Juilliard faculty colleague, to play on one of his albums, and followed a run of four Sherman albums that had featured him on piano rather than vibraphone.

== Honors and accolades ==
In 2010, Sherman was selected as a Jazz Ambassador for the United States Department of State and Jazz at Lincoln Center, a role in which he toured internationally presenting master classes and performances.

Sherman was recognized in the Rising Star–Vibraphone category of the ''DownBeat'' critics poll in 2007 and was subsequently described in press coverage as having topped the category in both 2007 and 2008.He continued to place among the magazine's leading vibraphonists in critics' and readers' polls in the years that followed, a run of recognition that ''DownBeat'' itself later described as spanning more than a decade.

== Discography ==
=== As leader/co-leader ===
- High Rollin (Miles High Records, 1998)
- Spiral Staircase(Miles High Records, 1999)
- The Motive Series(Miles High Records 2004) featuring Michael Brecker
- One Step Closer (Miles High Records, 2005) featuring Joe Lovano
- Family First (Miles High Records, 2007)
- Live at the Bird's Eye (Miles High Records, 2008)
- Live at Sweet Rhythm NYC (DVD, (Miles High Records, 2010)
- The L.A. Sessions (Miles High Records 2012) with Bill Cunliffe (Hammond B3), John Chiodini (guitar), and Charles Ruggiero (drums)
- My Other Voice (Miles High Records, 2019) featuring Vincent Herring, Nana Sakamoto and Dan Chmielinski, Ray Drummond and Carl Allen
- “Bop Contest” (Miles High Records) 2025 featuring Donald Vega, Ron Carter, Carl Allen, and Joe Magnarelli.

=== As sideman ===
- Joe Beck, Back to Beck (DMP, 1988)
- Maureen McGovern, Naughty Baby (CBS Masterworks, 1989)
- Peggy Lee Sings the Blues (1989)
- Peggy Lee, Musicmasters Jazz Sampler (Musicmasters, 1989)
- Peggy Lee, There Will Never Be Another Spring (1990)
- Maureen McGovern, Gershwin (1990)
- Love Songs (Sony, 1992)
- LaVerne Butler Daydreamin (Chesky, 1992)
- Rodney Jones, The Unspoken Heart (1992)
- Christmas Songs (Milestone, 1993)
- Smooth Jazz Slow Jams (1993)
- Peggy Lee, Love Held Lightly Songs of Harold Arlen (1993)
- Ruth Brown, Songs of My Life (Fantasy, 1993)
- Best of Chesky Classics (Chesky, 1994)
- Larry Coryell, I'll Be Over You (CTI, 1994)
- Rhymes and Fables, Cab Calloway, Freddie Hubbard (1995)
- Kiss of the Spiderwoman, Original Cast Recording (1995)
- LaVerne Butler, No Lookin' Back (Chesky, 1994)
- Chesky Records Collection No. 1 (1995)
- Larry Coryell, Sketches of Coryell (Shanachie, 1996)
- Boys Next Door (1996)
- In and Out Original Soundtrack (1997)
- Steel Pier (Original Cast Recording) (1997)
- Julian Coryell, Duality (N2K, 1997)
- Michael Bolton, All That Matters (1997)
- The Lion King (Original Soundtrack) (1997)
- Hercules (Original Soundtrack) (1998)
- Gloria Lynne, This One's on Me (HighNote, 1998)
- Armageddon, Aerosmith (Original Soundtrack) (1999)
- Footloose (Broadway Cast Album) (1999)
- Rodney Jones, Undiscovered Few (Blue Note, 1999)
- Scott Hesse, Flame Within a Fire (2000)
- Larry Coryell, New High (HighNote, 2000)
- The Prime Gig (Original Soundtrack (2000)
- The Score (Original Soundtrack) (2001)
- Ronny Jordan, Off the Record (2001)
- The Rookie (Original Soundtrack) (2002)
- Two Weeks Notice Original Soundtrack (2002)
- Liza Minnelli, Liza's Back (2002)
- Blue Voices, The Finest in Jazz Ballads (2003)
- Mary Fahl, The Other Side of Time (CBS, 2003)
- DJ Spinna, Here to There (2003)
- Intolerable Cruelty Original Soundtrack (2003)
- David Chesky's Surround Sound Show (2004)
- Ronny Jordan, After 8 (Blue Note, 2004)
- The Alamo (Original Soundtrack) (2004)
- Ann Hampton Callaway, Slow (Shanachie, 2004)
- Miss Congeniality Original Soundtrack (2004)
- Miss Congeniality 2 (2005)
- Last Holiday Soundtrack (2005)
- Cheryl Wheeler, Defying Gravity (CBS Masterworks, 2005)
- The Light and the Piazza (Broadway Cast Album) (2005)
- Failure to Launch Original Soundtrack (2006)
- See What I Wanna See (Broadway Cast Album) (2006)
- Lena Horne, Seasons of a Life (Blue Note 2006)
- The Last Mimzy (Original Soundtrack) (2006)
- Jennifer Holiday (2008)
- Manure (Original Soundtrack (2008)
- Capathia Jenkins, Louis Rosen (PS Classics, 2009)
- Erin McDougald, Outside the Soiree
- Dan Block, From His World to Mine (Miles High, 2010)
- Jerry Costanza, Can't We Be Friends (Daywood Drive, 2011)
- Eddie Mendenhall, Cosign Meets Tangent (Miles High, 2011)
- Andy Farber, Big Band (2010)
- Tim Horner, The Places We Feel Free (Miles High, 2012)
- Dan Block, Duality (Miles High, 2012)
- Tim Hegarty, Tribute (Miles High, 2014)
- Laura Perlman, Precious Moments (Miles High, 2016)

=== As a producer ===
- Larry Coryell, I'll Be Over You (CTI Records, 1994)
- Larry Coryell, Sketches of Coryell (Shanachie, 1996)
- Dan Block, From His World to Mine (Miles High Records, 2010
- Eddie Mendenhall, Cosign Meets Tangent (Miles High Records, 2011)
- Dan Block, Duality (Miles High Records, 2013)
- Tim Hegarty, Tribute (Miles High Records, 2014)
- Laura Perlman, Precious Moments (Miles High Records, 2016)
- Masumi Ormandy “By The Sea” (Miles High Records 2023

=== Singles ===
- "Changes in My Life" Columbia Records 1986

== Bibliography ==
- Skills for the Poetic Language of Jazz Improvisation, with School and Career Guidance (Miles High Music Books), 2015
