= Martina DaSilva =

American jazz vocalist and composer

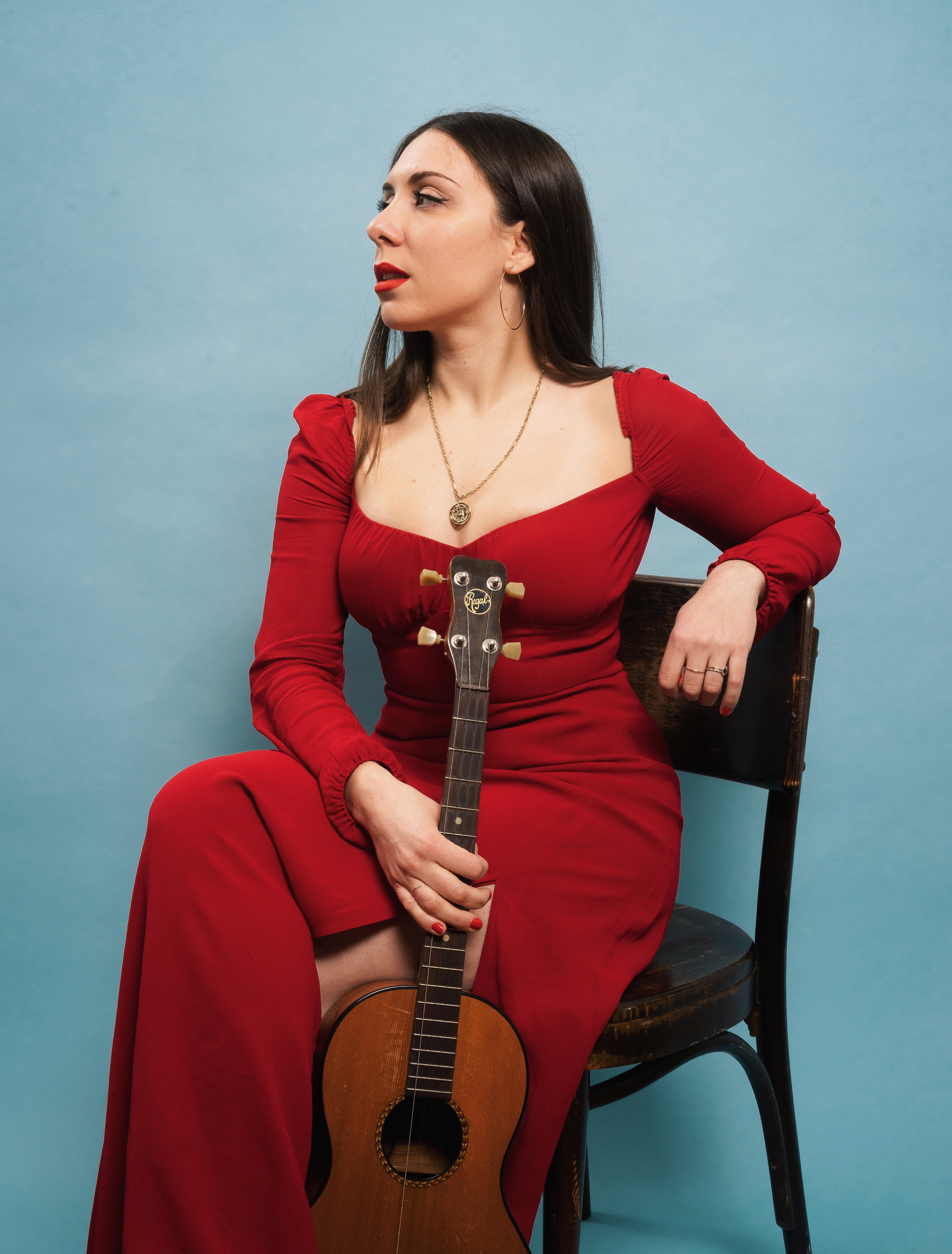

Background information
- Born: New York City, U.S.
- Genre: Jazz
- Occupations: Musician, singer
- Instruments: Vocals, ukulele, tenor guitar, guitar
- Label: La Reserve
- Website: martinadasilva.com

Martina DaSilva is an American jazz vocalist, composer, and arranger. In addition to being a leading member of the band The Ladybugs, DaSilva has worked with Jon Batiste, Postmodern Jukebox, Gunhild Carling, and Bria Skonberg.

== Early life ==
Raised in New York City, DaSilva was born to a Brazilian father and American mother. She speaks fluent Portuguese. As a child, she performed in local musical theatre productions and eventually studied both classical music and jazz at Fiorello H. LaGuardia High School, graduating in 2009 (alongside Josh Holcomb, Zack O’Farrill, Adam O'Farrill, Joanna Sternberg, and others).

DaSilva initially attended McGill University in Montréal, but opted to return to New York City and complete her undergraduate degree at The New School for Jazz and Contemporary Music in 2011. She studied formally with Andres Andrade, Peter Eldridge and Neal Miner. During this time, DaSilva also became heavily involved in New York City's reburgeoning early jazz scene and performed regularly throughout the city as both a bandleader and vocalist.

== Career ==
In 2013, DaSilva formed her band The Ladybugs through a chance encounter at the Hotel Chantelle in New York City's Lower East Side. While filling in for another vocalist at the hotel's rooftop restaurant, the venue's manager approached DaSilva and asked if she had a unique concept band that could perform regularly on Sundays. Although she had no such group at the time, she responded that she led an "all-female 1920s band" called The Ladybugs. She quickly assembled a group and initially performed as the band's sole vocalist before being joined by vocalist Kate Davis. The duo augmented with ukulele and snare drum, eventually integrating trombonists Joe McDonough and Rob Edwards and additional members on guitar and bass. Davis eventually left the group to pursue her solo work and was replaced by current frontline vocalist Vanessa Perea. Repertoire has included music from the 1920s, 1930s, 1940s and 1950s as well as songs drawn from DaSilva's and Perea's Latin-American heritage and Disney classics.

DaSilva was singled out as one of the most notable jazz vocalists of her generation in a 2015 article published by Vanity Fair.

In 2018, she was recruited by Scott Bradlee to join Postmodern Jukebox. She has since performed globally with the group and has been notably featured on the group's single Beautiful (adapted from its original performance by Christina Aguilera).

DaSilva collaborated with acoustic bassist Dan Chmielinski in 2019 to compose, record, produce and release the holiday-inspired album A Very ChimyTina Christmas. The recording primarily featured the pair in a duo format, but also included guest artists Lucas Pino, Ben Wolfe, Joel Ross and Gabe Schnider. The album featured DaSilva's original song "Diamonds and Pearls" and a music video cover of Wham!'s "Last Christmas". A Very ChimyTina Christmas received critical acclaim in the New York Times and Rolling Stone Magazine, among others.

DaSilva has been a frequent musical guest and contributor for Fireside Mystery Theatre, a podcast specializing in historical theatrical performances. She has also performed regularly with immersive-theatre troupe Little Cinema.

Early in 2020, DaSilva began inviting friends and collaborators over to her apartment to shoot live performances. After organizing and coordinating the band, music, and footage, she would release it on social media. These recordings quickly developed into full imaginative albums which encapsulated her next three LIVING ROOM releases (2021 and 2023).

DaSilva performed in Adam Neely's analysis of "The Girl From Ipanema" in 2020 which received over 4.2 million views on YouTube. She later contributed to Neely's analysis of "Castaways" from The Backyardigans in 2021, which amassed nearly 3 million views.

In 2022, DaSilva collaborated with Dan Chmielinski again, and they released their Constellations album. Constellations featured regular and new guest artists such as Marquis Hill, Ken Kubota, Andrew Renfroe, Grace Kelly, and Joel Ross. Containing two Martina DaSilva originals, "Twin Flame" and "My Universe," Bass Magazine praised DaSilva's "stunning acuity for composition." The pair has been able to consistently produce a unique and touching sound with their thoughtful arrangements. In 2023, Milky Way was released and featured Gabe Schnider, Chad LB, Joel Ross, Lucas Pino, Sasha Berliner, Dida Pelled, Michael Stephenson, and Grace Kelly.

== Personal life ==
DaSilva is married to Lucky Chops trombonist Josh Holcomb.

== Discography ==
=== As leader ===
Album artist	Title	Year	Label
Martina DaSilva & Dan Chmielinski	ChimyTina and Chill	2020	Independent
The Ladybugs	Songs We Love: Volume 1	2019	Independent
Martina DaSilva & Dan Chmielinski	A Very ChimyTina Christmas	2019	Outside in Music
The Ladybugs	Blue Christmas	2017	Independent
The Ladybugs	The Ladybugs	2015	Independent
Martina DaSilva	Living Room 1	2021	La Reserve
Martina DaSilva	Living Room 2	2021	La Reserve
Martina DaSilva & Casey Abrams	Martina & Casey	2021	La Reserve
Martina DaSilva & Dan Chmielinski	Constellations	2022	La Reserve Records
Martina DaSilva	Living Room 3	2023	La Reserve
Martina DaSilva & Dan Chmielinski	Milky Way	2023	La Reserve

=== As guest ===
Album artist	Title	Year	Label
Postmodern Jukebox	Sepia is the New Orange	2019	Mud Hut Digital
Ricky Alexander	Strike Up the Band	2019	Outside in Music
Russell Hall	The Feeling of Romance	2019	Independent
Steven Feifke	Prologue	2021	La Reserve
Adam Neely	Castaways	2021	Independent
Tony Glausi	Historia de un Amor	2020	Independent
Matt Block	Goodbye (Again)	2022	La Reserve
Steven Feifke	My Foolish Heart	2023	La Reserve
