= The Dreamer (José James album) =

Studio album by José James
- Released: January 28, 2008
- Genre: Jazz, R&B, soul, hip hop
- Length: 56:16
- Label: Brownswood Recordings
- Producer: José James

José James chronology
The Dreamer (2008)	Blackmagic (2010)

Singles from The Dreamer
- 1. "Blackeyedsusan" Released: 2007; 2. "Park Bench People" Released: 2008

Professional ratings
Review scores
Source	Rating
All About Jazz	4/5 stars
AllMusic	4/5 stars
BBC	favorable
Exclaim!	favorable
The Guardian	4/5 stars

The Dreamer is the first studio album by American jazz vocalist José James. It was released on Brownswood Recordings in 2008. A 10th Anniversary Edition was released in 2018, remastered and with 4 additional tracks.

== Critical reception ==
John Fordham of The Guardian gave the album 4 stars out of 5, saying, "James sometimes suggests a 21st-century Leon Thomas (the 1970s singer who became an acid-jazz star), but he also exhibits a highly personal mix of Bobby McFerrin's tonal delicacy and the R&B and soul feel of D'Angelo - with the latter association sometimes reinforced by the way the vocal overdubs and harmonies work." Thomas Barlow of BBC said, "Stripped down and captivatingly raw, this is bonafide jazz all the way."

Adam Greenberg of AllMusic gave the album 4 stars out of 5, saying, "He sings contemporary jazz with a strong sense of respect for the classics, but quietly puts hip-hop instrumentation behind his vocals, and multi-tracks himself for accentuation."

== Track listing ==
No.	Title	Writer(s)	Length
1.	"The Dreamer"	José James	7:05
2.	"Velvet"	José James	4:01
3.	"Blackeyedsusan"	José James	4:56
4.	"Park Bench People"	Freestyle Fellowship	6:03
5.	"Spirits Up Above"	Rahsaan Roland Kirk	5:00
6.	"Nola"	Bill Lee	3:56
7.	"Red"	José James	5:15
8.	"Winter Wind"	José James	7:07
9.	"Desire"	José James, Nori Ochiai	7:29
10.	"Love"	José James, Ryan Blum	5:24

== Personnel ==
Credits adapted from liner notes.

- José James – vocals
- Omar Abdulkarim – trumpet
- Nori Ochiai – piano
- Junior Mance – piano
- Ryan Blum – keyboards
- Gal Ben Haim – guitar
- Alexi David – bass guitar, double bass
- Luke Damrosch – drums
- Steve Lyman – drums
- Gilles Peterson – executive production

== Charts ==
Chart	Peak position
UK Jazz & Blues Albums (OCC)	16
