= Taali (musician) =

American singer, songwriter, and record producer

- Also known as: Taali
- Born: Talia Pnina Billig; May 12, 1988 (age 38); New York City
- Genres: pop, singer-songwriter, folk, anti-folk
- Occupations: Songwriter, singer, record producer
- Instruments: Voice, piano, synthesizer
- Label: Rainbow Blonde Records
- Website: www.taalimusic.com

Talia Pnina Billig (born May 12, 1988), known professionally as Taali, is a Grammy nominated American singer, songwriter, and record producer. She cofounded Rainbow Blonde Records alongside José James and Brian Bender.

== Early life and education ==
Billig was born in New York City to a musical Jewish family. She first played piano at her grandmother's apartment in Washington Heights, Manhattan at five years old. She moved with her family to Hastings-on-Hudson, New York in 1993., and attended Hastings High School.

After high school she attended college at The New School for Jazz and Contemporary Music where she studied with Becca Stevens and Sasha Dobson.

== Music career ==
During her time at the New School, Billig launched her video salon The Orchard Sessions, filmed out of her Lower East Side apartment. Totaling 18 sessions, The Orchard Sessions featured Billig alongside artists like José James, Snarky Puppy, Becca Stevens, Luke Temple, Matt Simons, Camila Meza, Johanna Warren and Charlotte Cornfield.

She also worked at Blue Note Records for Bruce Lundvall and Don Was.

In 2014, José James invited her to write on his second Blue Note album While You Were Sleeping. Billig co-wrote two songs, and was invited on world tour with him to support the album.

In 2017, Billig moved from New York City to Los Angeles. During this time she wrote, produced and released her debut album I Am Here under her own label, Rainbow Blonde Records. Its first single's video, "Hear You Now," premiered in Billboard. While in Los Angeles she also shifted from her birth name to stage name Taali, to honor her family's nickname for her.

Taali moved back to New York City in 2019, and released two more EPs, Were Most Of Your Stars Out? and Were You Busy Writing Your Heart Out? both on Rainbow Blonde Records.

In January 2021 Taali received a visa to move to Amsterdam as an artist in residence / guest faculty at the Conservatorium van Amsterdam. There she taught at both the pop and jazz school. While in Amsterdam she launched her weekly newsletter Taali Talk, which is emailed to subscribers every Sunday. She also toured European venues including the Concertgebouw, Paradiso, and Ancienne Belgique.

In June 2022 Taali moved from Amsterdam back to the United States, specifically Pasadena, where she now lives.

== Awards ==
Talia Billig was nominated in 2021 for a Grammy Award for Best Arrangement, Instrumental and Vocals for her work with Becca Stevens.

== Personal life ==
Billig married José James on May 5, 2019.

Billig and James live in Pasadena.

== Discography ==
=== LPs ===
- I Am Here (Rainbow Blonde Records, 2019)
- I Am Here: Mentals (Rainbow Blonde Records, 2020)
- When Did The World Start Ending? (Live at Levon Helm Studios) (Rainbow Blonde Records, 2021)
- taali (Rainbow Blonde Records, 2023)

=== EPs ===
- Were Most Of Your Stars Out? (Rainbow Blonde Records, 2019)
- Were You Busy Writing Your Heart Out? (Rainbow Blonde Records, 2020)

=== Credits ===
Year	Album	Artist	Songs	Credits
2024	Sometimes, Late At Night	Jharis Yokley	Was It Really Love	Vocals
2024	1978	José James	Let's Get It, Isis & Osiris, Planet Nine, Saturday Night (Need You Now), Dark Side of The Sun (feat. Baloji_(rapper)), Place of Worship (feat. Xênia_França)	String Arrangement, Vocal Arrangement, Composer, lyricist, Vocals, Handclaps
2022	ache for	Moby	ache for	Composer, lyricist, Vocals
2021	Merry Christmas from José James	José James	Christmas in New York, Christmas Day, This Christmas	Composer, lyricist, Vocals
2020	No Beginning No End 2	José James	You Know What It Do, Turn Me Up (feat. Aloe Blacc), Feels So Good (feat. Cecily), Baby Don't Cry (feat. J. Hoard), I Found A Love (feat. Taali), Saint James, Oracle (高尾山) (feat. Hindi Zahra and Erik Truffaz)	Composer, lyricist, Synthesizer, Vocal Arrangement, Vocals, Xylophone
2020	Wonderbloom	Becca Stevens	Slow Burn (feat. Jacob Collier), Feels Like This, Halfway (feat. Laura Perrudin)	Composer, lyricist
2019	Lune Rouge	Erik Truffaz	Reflections (feat. José James)	Lyricist
2017	Love in a Time Of Madness	José James	Remember Our Love, Live Your Fantasy, To Be With You, Breakthrough, I'm Yours	Composer, lyricist
2014	While You Were Sleeping	José James	U R The 1, Without U	Composer, lyricist
