= The Ladybugs =

American jazz band

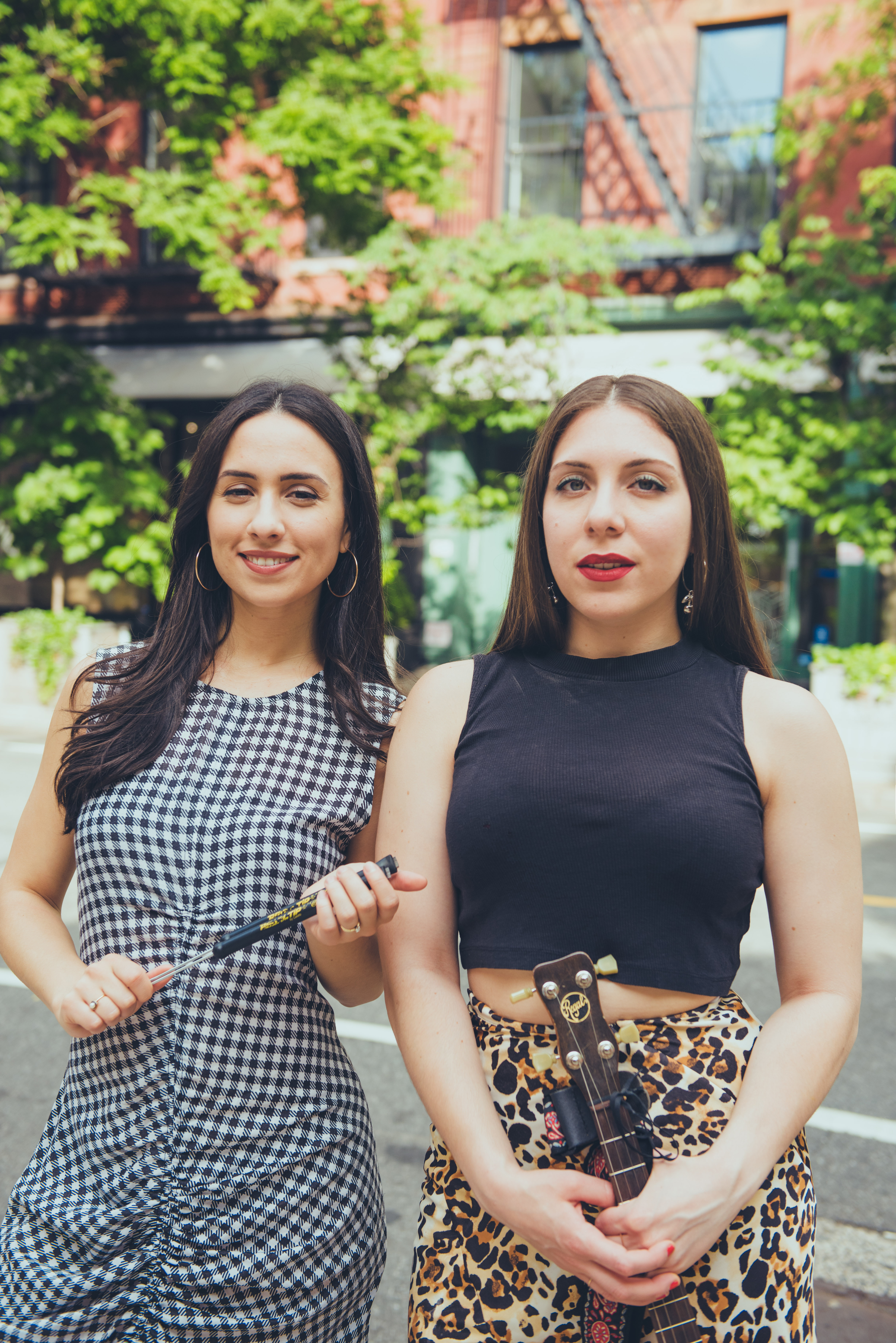
- Vocalists Vanessa Perea and Martina DaSilva

Background information
- Genres: Jazz; Traditional jazz
- Years active: 2013–present
- Labels: Outside In Music
- Members: Martina DaSilva; Vanessa Perea
- Past members: Kate Davis
- Website: theladybugsband.com

The Ladybugs are an American traditional jazz band based in New York City. Initially founded by vocalist Martina DaSilva, the group eventually integrated additional vocals by Kate Davis and later Vanessa Perea. The band is known for its unique instrumentation—the vocalists double on snare drum and ukulele and are supported by dual trombones, bass and guitar. The group's musical repertoire is largely determined by DaSilva and Perea and draws upon songs from early jazz and the american songbook as well as more contemporary pieces arranged for a traditional jazz aesthetic.

== History ==
During her education at The New School for Jazz and Contemporary Music, DaSilva worked as a vocalist throughout the greater New York City area. While substituting for another vocalist at the Hotel Chantelle in New York City’s Lower East Side in 2013, DaSilva became acquainted with the venue’s manager, who inquired if she had a band of her own that could perform at the venue on Sundays. Although she had no such group at the time, she responded that she led an ‘’all-female 1920’s band’’ named "The Ladybugs.” DaSilva set about assembling a group which initially included vocalist Kate Davis. The duo augmented performances by respectively doubling on snare drum and ukulele and eventually integrated trombonists Joe McDonough and Rob Edwards as well as other performers, including guitarist Gabe Schnider, saxophonist Eddie Barbash, bassist Dylan Shamat, and others.

Kate Davis eventually left the group and was replaced by vocalist Vanessa Perea. The group began to incorporate repertoire reflecting DaSilva's Brazilian heritage and Perea's Cuban-Colombian heritage during this time.

The group performs regularly throughout the United States as well internationally. They have been featured on NPR’s Jazz Night In America.

Both DaSilva and former vocalist Kate Davis have been frequent guest formers with Scott Bradlee’s Postmodern Jukebox.

== Discography ==
=== As The Ladybugs ===
Title	Year	Label
Songs We Love: Volume 1	2019	Independent
Blue Christmas	2017	Independent
The Ladybugs	2015	Independent

=== As guests ===
Album artist	Title	Year	Label
Russell Hall	The Feeling of Romance	2019	Independent
