= Rainbow Blonde Records =

Independent record label

- Founded: 2018
- Founder: José James, Talia Billig, Brian Bender
- Genre: Jazz, R&B, singer-songwriter, Electronica
- Country of origin: U.S.
- Location: New York City, Los Angeles
- Official website: www.rainbowblonderecords.com

Rainbow Blonde Records is an independent record label founded by José James, Talia Billig (aka Taali) and Brian Bender. The label was initially formed when James received the rights back to his first album The Dreamer from Brownswood Recordings, and grew to include original releases from a roster including artists Ben Williams, Taali, Jharis Yokley and Bright & Guilty.

== History ==
Rainbow Blonde was founded by James and Billig in 2018 in New York City. The two met while Billig was working at Blue Note Records for Bruce Lundvall.

In building Rainbow Blonde, James and Billig worked to create a collective as much as a new record label. Rainbow Blonde's collective includes house photographer Janette Beckman, filmmaker Madelyn Deutch, business manager Kristin Lee and many others.

Taali's debut LP "I Am Here" was the first full-length original release for Rainbow Blonde in 2019. In February 2020, Ben Williams released his first LP on Rainbow Blonde with his critically acclaimed civil rights album "I Am A Man.". José James released his first new LP on Rainbow Blonde with his album No Beginning No End 2 in March 2020.

== Discography ==
=== LPs ===
1. The Dreamer (10th Anniversary Edition) (2018) – José James
2. I Am Here (2019) – Taali
3. I Am A Man (2020) – Ben Williams
4. No Beginning No End 2 (2020) – José James
5. Blackmagic (10th Anniversary Edition) (2020) – José James
6. José James: New York 2020 (Live) (2021) – José James
7. When Did The World Start Ending? (Live at Levon Helm Studios) (2021) – Taali
8. Merry Christmas from José James (2021) – José James
9. On & On (2023) – José James
10. taali (2023) – Taali
11. 1978 (2024) – José James
12. Sometimes, Late At Night (2024) – Jharis Yokley

=== EPs ===
1. Were Most Of Your Stars Out? (2019) – Taali
2. Were You Busy Writing Your Heart Out? (2020) – Taali

=== Instrumental LPS ===
1. No Beginning No End 2: Mentals (2020) – José James
2. I Am A Man: Mentals (2020) – Ben Williams
3. I Am Here: Mentals (2020) – Taali
4. Bright & Guilty: Mentals (2020) – Bright & Guilty

=== Singles/Remixes ===
1. Soft Age (2019) – Bright & Guilty
2. STDs (2020) – Bright & Guilty
3. Soft Age (KoolKojak Remix) (2020) – Bright & Guilty
4. Hear You Now (TR/ST Remix) (2020) – Taali
5. High Road Pt. 2 (Natasha Diggs and Ian Wallace Remix) (2020) – Ben Williams

== See also ==
- List of record labels
