= Erin McDougald =

American jazz musician

Erin McDougald is a jazz vocalist. Her album Outside the Soirée featured Tom Harrell on trumpet and flugelhorn, and Dave Liebman on soprano and tenor saxophones. McDougald wrote the arrangements for the album.

== Discography ==
- Meeting Place (self-release, 2005)
- Outside the Soiree (Miles High, 2017)
