= Julian Waterfall Pollack =

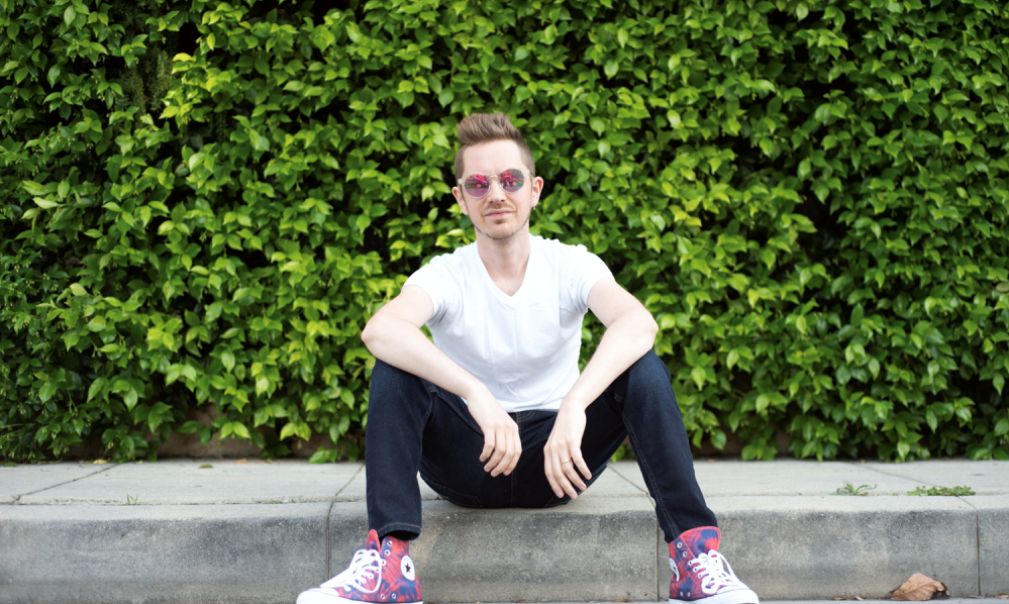

Background information
- Also known as: J3PO
- Born: 28 June 1988 (age 38)
- Genres: Jazz
- Occupation: Musician
- Instruments: Piano, synthesizer
- Labels: Ropeadope, Berthold, Junebeat
- Formerly of: The Lesson
- Website: www.julianpollack.com

Julian Waterfall Pollack (born June 28, 1988), known professionally as J3PO, is an American pianist, keyboardist, composer, and producer associated with jazz, classical, and hip hop music.

== Biography ==
=== Early life ===
Raised in Berkeley, California, Pollack was introduced to music through his parents, Susan Waterfall (an accomplished concert pianist), and Allan Pollack (a conductor, saxophonist, and music professor at University of California, Berkeley). He began formal study of the piano at age of five with his mother, and was called a child prodigy, able to play difficult pieces of classical music well beyond his years. He attended The Crowden School in Berkeley, California, for his middle school years, where he received training in orchestral playing, chamber music, harmony, and counterpoint, as well as a courses in the liberal arts.

He later attended Berkeley High School where he developed his love for jazz, playing as principal pianist for four years in their award-winning jazz ensemble. He released his debut jazz trio album, Goin' for It, to much critical acclaim in the San Francisco Bay Area and achieved national recognition by being featured on Jazziz magazine's monthly CD.

After completing high schooling in 2006, he was offered a full scholarship to Berklee College of Music, but opted to instead attend New York University in New York City.

=== 2007–2014 ===
In 2007, he appeared as a guest on Marian McPartland's Piano Jazz radio show aired on NPR. He released his second trio album, Infinite Playground, to great critical acclaim in 2010. The album featured bassist Noah Garabedian and drummer Evan Hughes. The album showcased Pollack's growing interest in blending multiple genres with jazz improvisation and classical composition. It included Pollack's original pieces with "My Funny Valentine" by Rodgers and Hart, "Cherokee" by Ray Noble, and "And I Love Her" by the Beatles. He continued this trajectory with the trio's 2013 album, Waves of Albion, which included a polyrhythmic arrangement of "What Sarah Said" by Death Cab for Cutie, "Flume" by Bon Iver, and the American folk song "Oh Shenandoah".

Pollack composed a three movement piano concerto in 2012. It was premiered by the Camellia Symphony in Sacramento. The work's style and form drew heavily from jazz, minimalism, and French impressionism. In 2013, Pollack composed "Brooklyn Boomerang", a piece for two pianos which premiered at the Greenwich House in Manhattan in November by Pollack and acclaimed pianist Natalie Tenenbaum. He also completed a string quartet that was commissioned by the Telluride Chamber Music Festival and the Ives String Quartet. In 2014, Pollack premiered a new composition for orchestra entitled Night Flower at the Mendocino Music Festival.

=== 2015–2018 ===
In 2015, Pollack began exploring his interest in electronic music, synthesizers, sounds design and production, releasing music under the moniker "J3PO." The name came from his trio mate Evan Hughes:

He stated that his stage name “J3PO” originated from a voicemail in which he was referred to as “J3PO”. He later explained that the logo design by Emily Hoerdemann incorporates a stylized “3” resembling a sideways “W”, forming “J.W.PO”, which corresponds to his initials and references the character C-3PO from Star Wars.

He released The 90s EP in 2016, a collection of nineties pop songs re-harmonized, rearranged, and sung on the talkbox. In 2017 he released three original songs in the same vein, entitled Memory EP.

Starting in 2016 Pollack joined New York's celebrated Lower East Side underground hip-hop band The Lesson GK, a weekly jam session that seamlessly blends elements of experimental Hip-Hop, Jazz, Funk and Soul. In 2018 he began touring with legendary bassist and composer, Marcus Miller, joining his residency at The Blue Note Tokyo, and continuing on for several tours of the United States and Europe.

=== 2019–present ===
In 2019, Julian (as J3PO) released his album Small Plates, a collection of 12 tracks that range from simple lo-fi beats to complex jazztronica future house joints. Inspired by analog synths and sample-based music, the album fuses Julian's love for today's contemporary production styles with a nod to the jazz tradition and the spontaneity of live music and improvisation.

He began working closely with Clavia Nord Keyboards, designing a signature patch library for the Nord Stage 3. He also released a signature pack for the Nord Wave 2.

In 2020, Julian scored the indie film The Sound of the Wind, directed and written by Jared Douglas.

Julian was part of the sound design team to create patches for the new Prophet 5 reissue from Sequential. During the Coronavirus pandemic, Julian released a free bank of sounds for the Disco DSP synthesizer OB-Xd.

In 2021, Julian was asked to create presets for the Softube Model 84 Polyphonic Synthesizer which is a circuit-modeled emulation of a 1984 six-voice synth.

He signed with Ropeadope Records for his full length album, MAINS, released June 4, 2021.

== Discography ==
=== As leader ===
Title	Year	Label
MAINS	2021	Ropeadope
The Sound of the Wind (Motion Picture Soundtrack)	2020	Sound of Wind Movie, LLC
Small Plates	2019	Bridge and Water
Waves of Albion	2013	Berthold
Infinite Playground	2010	Junebeat
Goin’ For It	2006	Jazzschool

=== Select albums as sideman ===
Album artist	Title	Year	Label
Evan Marien	Parallels	2020	Evan Marien
Chase Baird (feat. Steve Lyman, J3PO & Dan Chmielinski)	Pulsar	2020	Outside In Music
Steve Lyman	Revolver	2013	Independent
Peter Schwebs	In-Between Seasons & Places	2012	Berthold
Grace Weber	Hope & Heart	2011	Junebeat
Chase Baird	Crosscurrent	2010	Junebeat
Peter Schwebs	Stories from Sugar Hill	2010	Laika
