= Nir Felder =

American jazz guitarist, composer, and songwriter

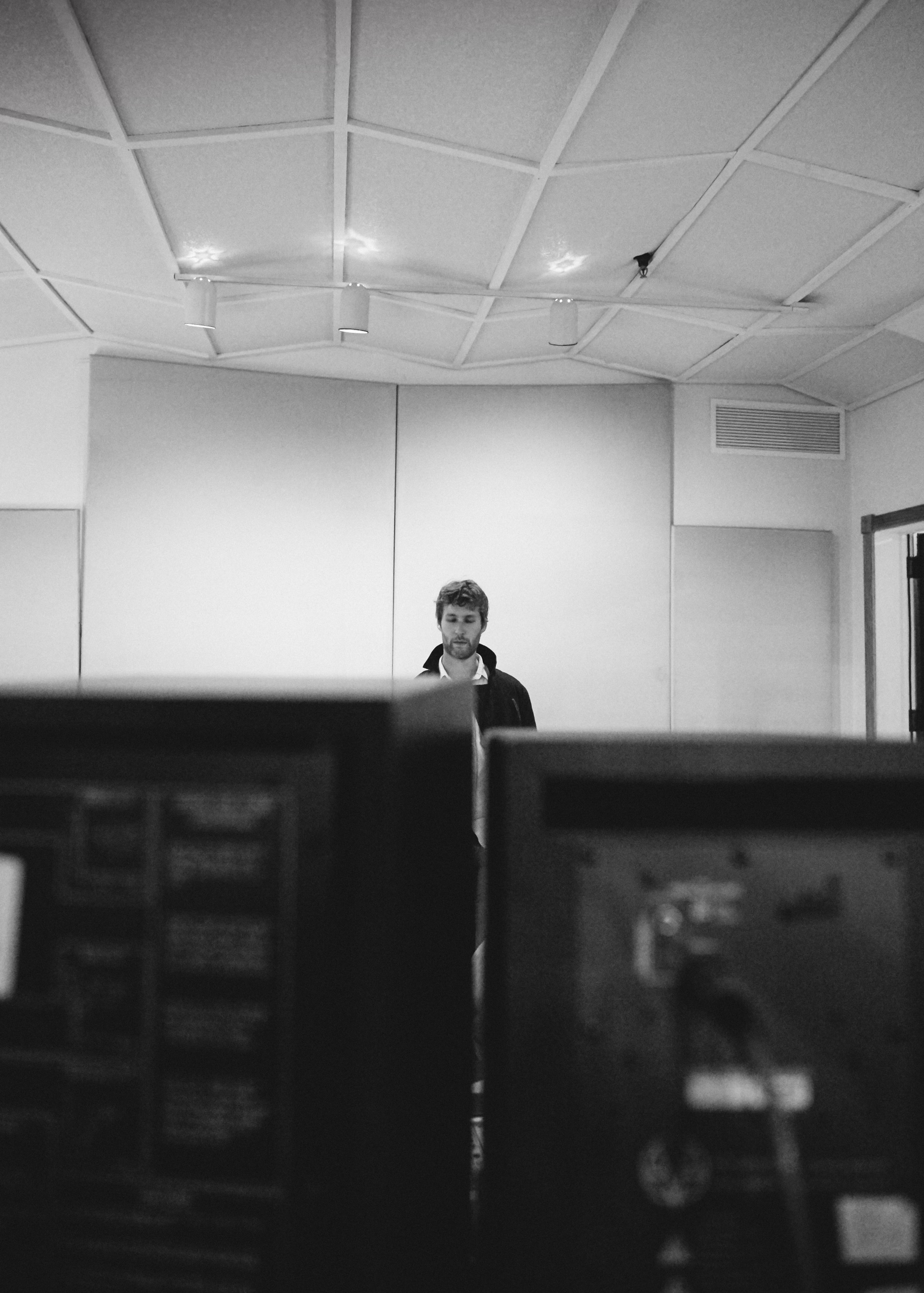

Background information
- Born: December 30, 1982 (age 43); New York City
- Genres: Jazz, Rock, Pop, R&B
- Occupations: Musician, composer, record producer
- Instrument: Guitar
- Website: nirfelder.com

Nir Felder (born December 30, 1982) is an American jazz and session guitarist, composer, and record producer. In addition to leading his own band, Felder has performed and recorded with a diverse array of artists across the jazz and popular music genre spectrum. (Note: Fellow artists include Snoop Dogg, Diana Krall, Jennifer Hudson, Brad Mehldau, John Mayer, Marcus Miller, Rina Sawayama, Josh Groban, Ben Platt, Chaka Khan, Sam Smith, Keyon Harrold, Robert Glasper, Yebba, Khalid, PJ Morton, Snarky Puppy, Terrace Martin, Kamasi Washington, Erykah Badu, Jeff Goldblum, Common, Anderson .Paak, Dave Chappelle, Taylor Hanson, Kelsea Ballerini, Dave Matthews Band, Benson Boone, Gov't Mule, Demi Lovato, Ben Stiller, Vulfpeck, Kacey Musgraves, Fred Armisen, Brockhampton, Cautious Clay, Laufey, Faith Evans, Rufus Wainwright, Pigeons Playing Ping Pong, Tori Kelly, Terri Lyne Carrington, Vijay Iyer, Blood Sweat and Tears, Gwenyth Paltrow, Chuck Mangione, Meghan Trainor, Greg Osby, Amy Schumer, Nicole Sherzinger, Victor Wooten, Jack DeJohnette, Alex Warren, Esperanza Spalding, Bobby McFerrin, Meshell Ndegeocello, Dianne Reeves, the New York City Opera, and others.) In both 2021 and 2023, he won DownBeat 's Critic's Poll for "Rising Star Guitarist."

== Early life ==
Nir Felder was born December 30, 1982, at Columbia Presbyterian Hospital in New York City's Washington Heights neighborhood. After living between Washington Heights, Harlem, and Manhattan's Upper West Side, his family moved to the New York City suburbs of Hartsdale, New York in 1987 and Katonah, New York in 1994.

He attended John Jay High School from 1997 to 2001 and the Berklee College of Music from 2001 to 2005. While at Berklee he was the recipient of the Billboard Endowed Scholarship, as well as the college's Jimi Hendrix Award, and Stephen D. Holland Award.

== Career ==
In 2010, Felder was lauded as the "next big jazz guitarist" by NPR. In 2013, Felder signed to Sony Masterworks and released his first solo album Golden Age under their Okeh imprint in 2014.

His second album II was released by Ropeadope Records in 2020, followed by another album, entitled III, released by La Reserve in 2024.

== Educational ==
Felder has been a faculty member at The New School's College of Performing Arts since 2016 and an associate professor at Berklee College of Music since 2020.

He has also taught at Italy's Fondazione Siena Jazz since 2012, at workshops at the Banff Centre and in Langnau, Switzerland and given masterclasses at Arnhem Conservatory, the Cultural Center de Belem, the University of Southern California, Los Angeles College of Music, the University of North Texas, Hunter College, Humber College, the University of Toronto, the University of Wisconsin–Parkside, Los Angeles County High School for the Arts, the CENART National Center for The Arts in Mexico City, and many others.

== Film, television, and Broadway appearances ==
Felder appears in the Netflix special Ben Platt Live from Radio City Music Hall accompanying Ben Platt. He has also performed with various musical acts on The Late Show with Stephen Colbert, CBS Saturday Morning, The Tonight Show Starring Jimmy Fallon, NBC's Christmas in Rockefeller Center, Good Morning America, Late Night with Seth Meyers, The Late Late Show with James Corden, The Ellen DeGeneres Show, The View, Jimmy Kimmel Live!, The Today Show, the US Open Tennis Championships, as well as in the house bands of the Jimmy Kimmel Live! and Maya & Marty shows.

He has played in the pit orchestras of the Broadway shows Spider-Man: Turn Off the Dark, The Book of Mormon and & Juliet, as well as participating in workshops for upcoming shows.

He also appears on NPR's popular video series Tiny Desk, accompanying Keyon Harrold, PJ Morton, and Robert Glasper.

== Awards and honors ==
In 2010, Felder was called "The Next Big Jazz Guitarist" by NPR. The station also occasionally uses Felder's song "Bandits" as theme music on several of its shows, including Fresh Air hosted by Terry Gross.

In 2013, Felder won a Grammy Award for his work as guitarist on Terri Lyne Carrington's Money Jungle: Provocative in Blue, awarded "Best Jazz Instrumental Album".

He has also played on multiple other Grammy-nominated recordings, including Keyon Harrold's Foreverland, and Rachel Eckroth's The Garden.

In both 2021 and 2023, he won DownBeat's Critic's Poll for "Rising Star Guitarist".

== Equipment ==
Felder mainly plays a 1995 Made-In-Mexico Tex-Mex Fender Stratocaster guitar, which he purchased in 1996 at age 13. He uses a custom pedalboard designed by Johnny Gomez in Los Angeles, and various Marshall, Fender, and Vox amplifiers. He is endorsed by Taylor Guitars, Paul Reed Smith Guitars, Yamaha, Moollon Guitars, F Bass, Richard Heeres, D'addario Strings, Moody Leather Straps, Universal Audio, and Jerry Harvey Audio.

== Discography ==
=== As leader ===
- Golden Age (Sony Masterworks, 2014)
- II (Ropeadope, 2020)
- III (La Reserve, 2024)

=== As sideman ===
- Francisco Mela, Melao (AYVA Musica, 2006)
- Jon De Lucia Group, Face no Face (Jonji Music, 2006)
- Meilana Gillard, Day One (Inner Circle Music, 2008)
- Greg Osby, 9 Levels (Inner Circle Music, 2008)
- David Weiss, Snuck In (Sunnyside, 2008)
- Tim Kuhl, Ghost (Self-Released, 2008)
- Rebecca Collins, Chameleon Blues (Mutineer Music, 2008)
- Dan Aran, Breathing (Smalls, 2009)
- Tim Kuhl, King (Self-Released, 2009)
- Sean Nowell, The Seeker (Posi-Tone, 2009)
- Makoto Hirahara, Vocalese (Nippon Columbia, 2009)
- Sunny Jain, Taboo (Bjurecords, 2010)
- Alper Yılmaz, Over The Clouds (Kayique, 2010)
- Ken Thomson and Slow/Fast, It Would Be Easier If (Intuition, 2010)
- Nell Bryden, What Does It Take? (157 Records, 2010)
- Brian Landrus, Capsule (BlueLand, 2011)
- Jason Palmer, Here Today (Steeplechase, 2011)
- Bobby Selvaggio, Grass Roots Movement (Arabesque Recordings, 2011)
- Le Beouf Brothers, In Praise of Shadows (Nineteen-Eight Records, 2011)
- David Weiss, Snuck Out (Sunnyside, 2011)
- Maria Neckam, Unison (Sunnyside, 2012)
- Ben Wendel, Frame (Sunnyside, 2012)
- José James, No Beginning No End (Blue Note, 2012)
- Mark Guiliana, A Form of Truth (Heernt, 2013)
- Terri Lyne Carrington, Money Jungle: Provocative in Blue (GrooveJazz, 2013)
- Janek Gwizdala, Theatre by the Sea (Self-Released, 2013)
- Brian Landrus, Mirage (BlueLand, 2013)
- David Weiss, Venture Inward (Posi-Tone, 2013)
- Lauren Falls, The Quiet Fight (Self-Released, 2013)
- Tony Grey, Elevation (Abstract Logix, 2013)
- Stéphane Huchard, Panamerican (Jazz Village, 2013)
- Janek Gwizdala, Motion Picture (Self-Released, 2014)
- Eric Harland, Vipassana (GSI, 2014)
- Jerome Vroelijk's New Morning, New Morning Kong Suite (Self-Released, 2014)
- Rudy Royston, 303 (Greenleaf Music, 2014)
- Enoch Lee, Finish Line (Self-Released, 2014)
- Ken Thomson and Slow/Fast, Settle (NCM East, 2014)
- Otis Brown III, The Thought Of You (Blue Note, 2014)
- Hironori Momoi, Liquid Knots (Apollo Sounds, 2015)
- The NYC Improv Project, Melting Point (MFA Records Presents) (MFA, 2015)
- Manuel Valera & Groove Square, Urban Landscape (Destiny, 2015)
- Marine Futin, Qui Danse (Self-Released, 2015)
- Sarah Kervin, Into the City (Self-Released, 2015)
- Frank Catalano, Bye Bye Blackbird (Ropeadope, 2016)
- Band of Other Brothers, City of Cranes (Ear Up, 2016)
- Olivier Le Goas, Reciprocity (Neuklang, 2016)
- Sungtaek Oh, Harlem Renaissance (Artbus, 2016)
- Jason Miles & Ingrid Jensen, Kind of New (Whaling City Sound, 2016)
- Uros Spasojevic Project, Third View (Self-Released, 2016)
- The Wee Trio, Wee + 3 (Bionic, 2016)
- Lex Sadler's Rhythm and Stealth, Polytronic (Ropeadope, 2016)
- Kevin Field, The A List (Warner, 2017)
- Keyon Harrold, The Mugician (Sony, 2017)
- David Weiss, Wake Up Call (Ropeadope, 2017)
- Taylor Haskins, Gnosis (Recombination, 2017)
- May Cheung, The Departure (Self-Released, 2017)
- Bob Reynolds, Guitar Band (Self-Released, 2017)
- Rio Miyachi, November (Self-Released, 2017)
- Scott Kinsey Featuring Naina Kundu, No Sleep (Kinesthetic, 2017)
- Dick Brewer, It's All About Latin (Self-Released, 2017)
- Darren Barrett & dB-ish, The Opener (dB Studios, 2017)
- Deva Mahal, Run Deep (Motema Music, 2018)
- Sachal Vasandani, Shadow Train (GSI, 2018)
- Sylent Running (Barney McAll & Chris Hale & Gian Slater), Empathy Chip (Extra Celestial Arts, 2018)
- Matt Penman, Good Question (Sunnyside, 2018)
- Alyson Murray, Breathe (Self-Released, 2018)
- Charlie Rosen & the 8-Bit Big Band, Press Start! (Self-Released, 2018)
- Rémi-Jean Leblanc, Déductions (Bent River, 2018)
- Mosa, Who We Are (Self-Released, 2018)
- Javier Santiago, Phoenix (Ropeadope, 2018)
- Various, A Day In The Life: Impressions Of Pepper (Impulse!, 2018)
- Culture Revolution ft. Keyon Harrold, Sylwester Ostrowski, When You Are Here (Wydawnictwo Agora, 2018)
- Kevin Hays, Across the Sea (Via Veneto, 2019)
- Ben Platt, Sing to Me Instead (Deluxe) (Atlantic, 2019)
- Robin McKelle, Alterations (Doxie, 2019)
- Ziv Ravitz, No Man Is An Island (Sound Surveyor Music, 2019)
- Chase Baird ft. Brad Mehldau, A Life Between (Soundsabound, 2019)
- Javier Santiago, B-Sides: The Phoenix Sessions (Ropeadope, 2019)
- Brett Williams, S3asons (Self-Released, 2019)
- Olivier Le Goas & Reciprocity, On Ramp Of Heaven Dreams (Challenge, 2020)
- Kevin Field, Soundtology (Timezone, 2020)
- Ernesto Cervini, Tetrahedron (Anzic, 2020)
- Yutaka Yamada, Great Pretender Original Soundtrack (Wit Studio, 2020)
- Band of Other Brothers, Look Up! (Ear Up, 2021)
- Hironori Momoi, Flora and Fauna (Goon Trap, 2021)
- Rebecca Angel, Love Life Choices (Timeless Grooves, 2021)
- Shedrick Mitchell, What Do You Say? (Self-Released, 2021)
- Scott Kinsey & Mer Sal, Adjustments (Blue Canoe, 2021)
- Jared Schonig, Two Takes Volume 2: Big Band (Anzic, 2021)
- Brian Landrus, Red List (Palmetto, 2022)
- Rachel Eckroth, The Garden (Rainy Day, 2022)
- Geoff Keezer, Playdate (Markeez Records, 2022)
- Creswick fka Liam Budge, Reissues Vol. 1 (Self-Released, 2022)
- Alternative Guitar Summit, Honoring Pat Martino, Vol. 1 (HighNote, 2022)
- Ray Angry and Timo Elliston, Life & Beth (Original Series Soundtrack) (Lakeshore, 2022)
- Loris AL Raimondi, Passing Through Emotions (Fusion Notes, 2022)
- Christian Frentzen, Second Encounter (Self-Released, 2023)
- Marty Isenberg, The Way I Feel Inside: Inspired by the films of Wes Anderson (Self-Released, 2023)
- Alan Ferber, Up High, Down Low (Sunnyside, 2023)
- Jonathan Powell, Mambo Jazz Party (Circle 9 Records, 2024)
- Courtney Cutchins, Grunge to Grace (Self-Released, 2024)
- Band of Other Brothers, This Year at Christmas (Ear Up, 2024)
