= Tony Glausi =

American trumpeter

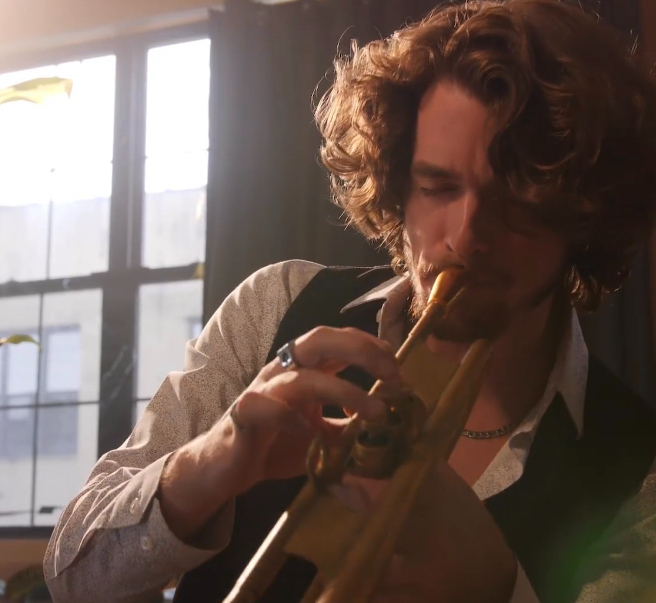
- Glausi performing Rie y Llora

Background information
- Born: August 30, 1994; Eugene, Oregon, United States
- Origin: Portland, Oregon, United States
- Genres: Jazz
- Occupations: Musician, music producer
- Instruments: Trumpet, flugelhorn, vocal, piano
- Website: tonyglausi.com

Tony Glausi (born August 30, 1994) is an American trumpeter, keyboardist, vocalist, composer, and music producer.

== Early life and education ==
Glausi was born to musician parents and grew up in Portland, Oregon. He started playing the trumpet at age 10 and studied classical music until age 16, continuing his studies at West Linn High School and Saratoga High School (California). He studied jazz performance and composition respectively as an undergraduate and later master's student at the University of Oregon in Eugene, Oregon.

== Career ==
In his college years, Glausi performed in the Pacific Northwest with artists including pianist Randy Porter, vocalist Halie Loren, and pianist George Colligan while also leading his own quintet and 9-piece band. In 2016, he recorded his debut album Identity Crisis. Upon winning the 2016-2017 Laurie Frink Career Grant.

Since 2018, Glausi has resided in New York City. He performs with pianist and singer Peter Cincotti, Remy Le Boeuf’s Assembly of Shadows, Halie Loren, Nana Mendoza, Big Daddy Kane, Emmet Cohen and many others.

He performed at the Montreux Jazz Festival in Switzerland, the Leopolis Jazz Festival in Ukraine, the Seoul Jazz Festival in South Korea, the Java Jazz Festival in Indonesia, and the Blue Note Jazz Club in New York.

Glausi currently serves on the faculty of the New School for Jazz and Contemporary Music in New York City.

== Awards ==
The International Trumpet Guild named Glausi the winner of its 2017 Jazz Improvisation Competition. He also won 1st place at the 2017 Carmine Caruso International Jazz Trumpet Solo Competition. Glausi was the sole recipient of the 2016–17 Laurie Frink Career Grant. He also earned 1st place in the jazz division of the 2014 National Trumpet Competition

== Discography ==
=== As leader ===
Title	Year	Label
Identity Crisis	2015	Independent
One-Dimensional Man	2016	Independent
Bad Boy (Live at the Jazz Station)	2017	Independent
Christmas With Tony Glausi	2017	Independent
TGXP Vol I: Midnight Snack	2018	Independent
TGXP Vol II: Confessional	2018	Independent
Exclusively Trumpet, Vol. 1 – EP	2019	Independent
My Favorite Tunes	2020	Independent
Sabor a Mí – EP	2020	Outside in Music
When It All Comes Crashing Down	2021	Outside in Music
EVERYTHING AT ONCE	2021	Outside in Music
EVERYTHING AT ONCE (DELUXE)	2022	Outside in Music
Noche No Te Vayas – EP	2022	Outside in Music
Awaken	2024	La Reserve Records

=== As sideman ===
Album artist	Title	Year	Label
Torrey Newhart Quintet	Marmara	2013	FatSon Music
Red Pants Trio	Square One	2014	Independent
George Colligan & Theoretical Planets	Risky Notion	2015	Origin Records
Sean Peterson Ess-tet	Let It Show	2015	Independent
Jessika Smith Big Band	Tricks of Light	2015	PJCE Records
The Liaisons	The Liaisons	2016	Independent
Torrey Newhart's Obsidian Animals	Sound In-Sight	2016	FatSon Music
Gabriel Davila	Familia	2016	Independent
Lyle Hopkins	May 15, 2016	2016	Independent
Nancy Hamilton	Dreamsville	2016	Independent
Ruth Theodore	Cactacus	2016	Aveline Records
Mastrogiovanni Ska Jazz Ensemble	Mastrogiovanni Ska Jazz Ensemble – EP	2016	Independent
Peter Hollens	A Hollens Family Christmas	2017	One Voice Productions
Ben LaTorraca	Septet & Quartets Live	2017	Independent
Red Pants Trio	This is RPT	2018	Independent
Evynne Hollens	Never Enough Broadway: The Contemporary Collection	2018	One Voice Productions
BG & the Sus 7	Morning Prayer – EP	2019	Independent
Peter Hollens	Magically Legendary Covers	2019	One Voice Productions
Speno & Smyth	Hand Me Downs – EP	2020	Speno & Smyth
Moblin	Yuckgod	2020	HELLA-DREGS
Remy Le Boeuf's Assembly of Shadows	Architecture of Storms	2021	SoundSpore Records
Martina DaSilva	Living Room 1	2021	La Reserve Records
yuckgod & Ghoulio	Yuckyghoul 2	2021	HELLA-DREGS
Milena Brody	Ya	2022	Brody Music
Brooke Robertson	Pickin' All Day Long	2023	Brooke Robertson Music
Nana Mendoza	...	2023	Natalia Mendoza
Peter Cincotti	Killer on the Keys	2023	Freddy Eggs Records
Sean Mason	The Southern Suite	2023	Blue Engine Records
Remy Le Boeuf's Assembly of Shadows	Heartland Radio	2024	Le Boeuf Music
