= Brian Landrus =

American jazz musician

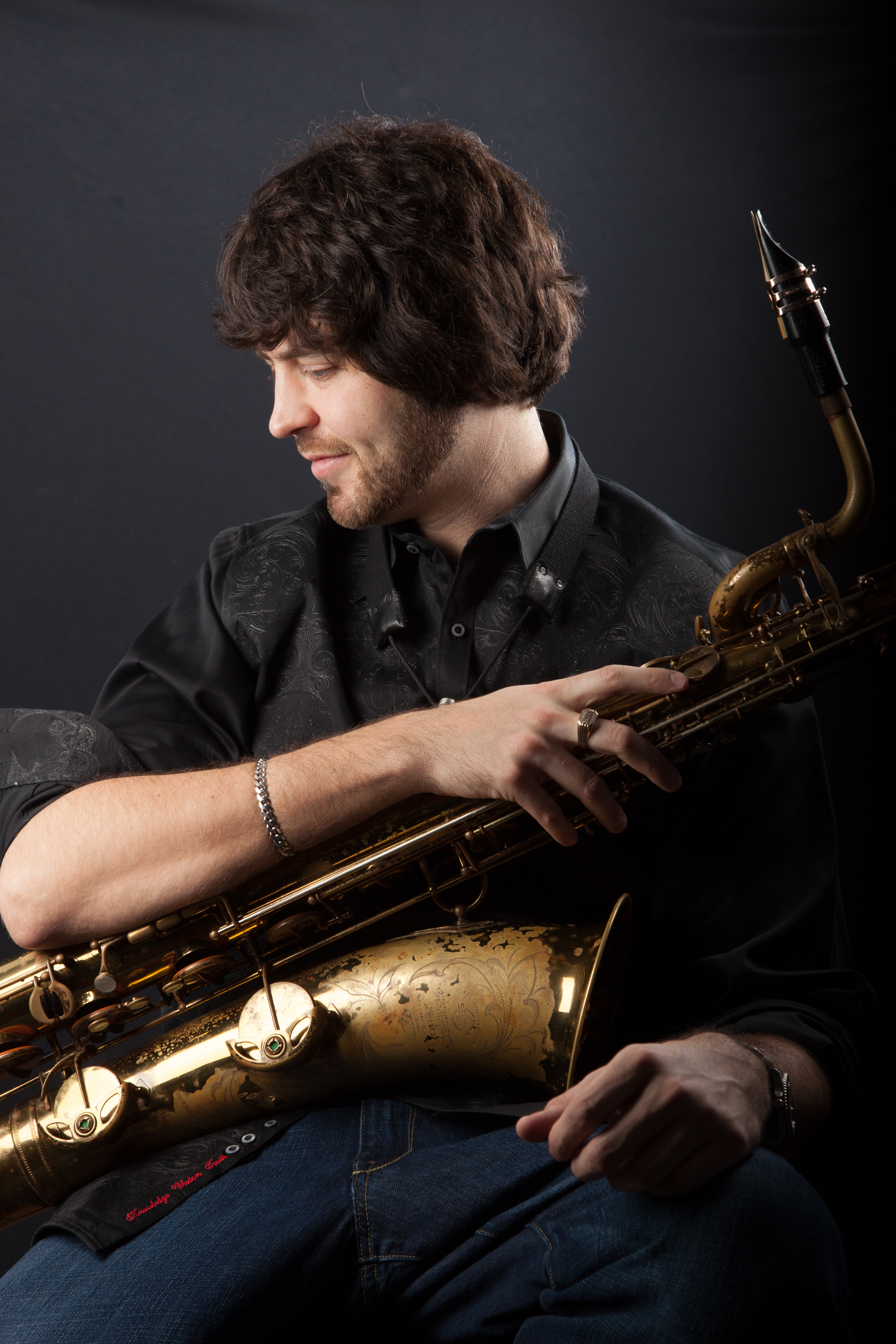

Background information
- Born: September 14, 1978 (age 47); Reno, Nevada, U.S.
- Genres: Jazz, jazz fusion
- Occupations: Musician, composer
- Instruments: Saxophone, clarinet, flute
- Years active: 1994-present
- Labels: Cadence Jazz, Blueland, CIMP, Palmetto
- Website: brianlandrus.com

Brian Landrus (born September 14, 1978) is a jazz saxophonist, multi-instrumentalist, composer, producer, and educator.

== Career ==
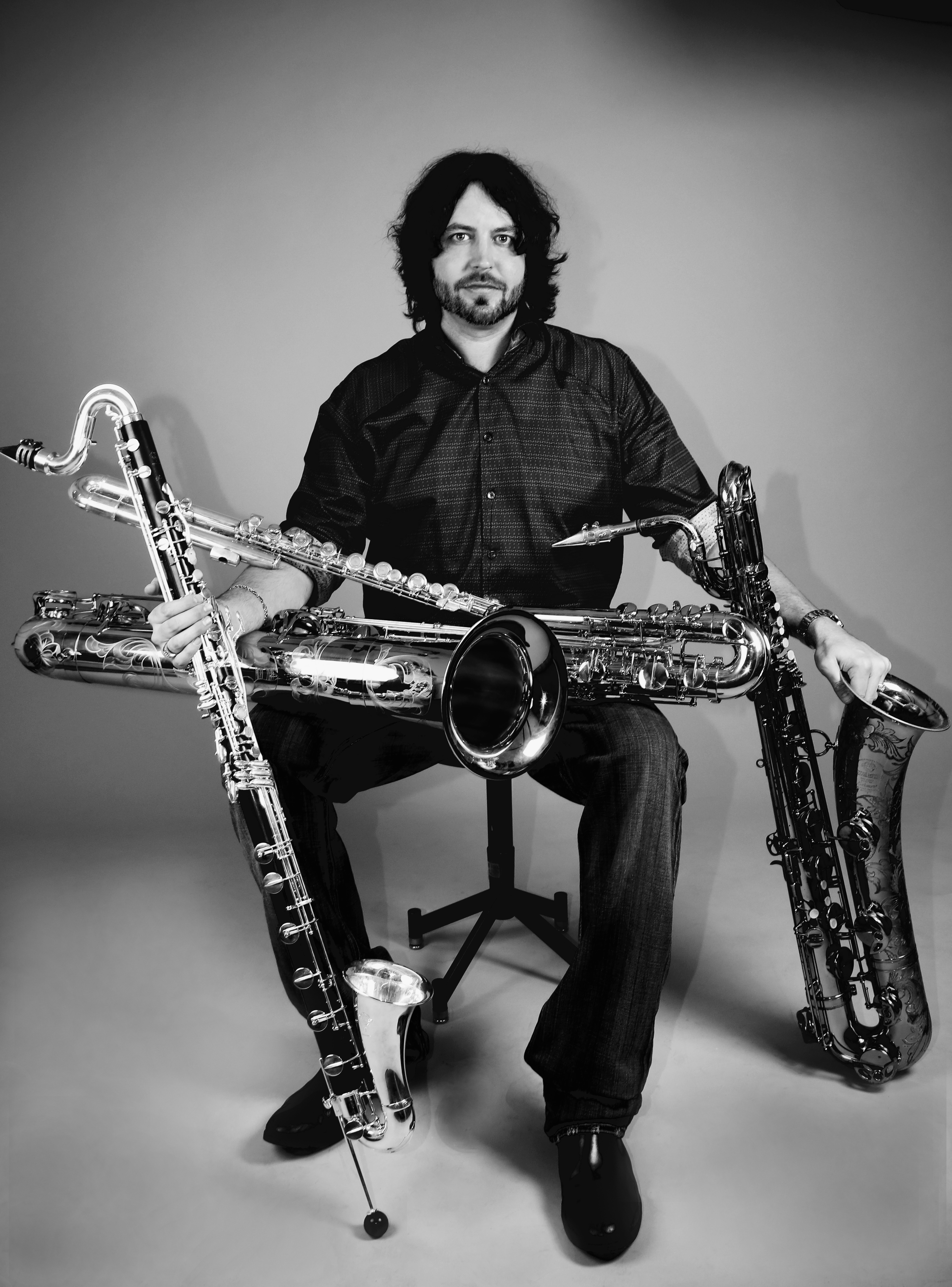

Landrus was born in Reno, Nevada, where he began playing professionally at the age of 13. He earned a degree in saxophone performance at the University of Nevada, Reno. At the age of 18 he began performing on tenor and baritone saxophone with The Temptations, The Four Tops, The Coasters, The Drifters, and Martha Reeves. In 2003 he moved to Boston in to attend the New England Conservatory. After graduation in 2007 Landrus recorded his album Forward for Cadence Jazz Records.

He toured internationally with Esperanza Spalding.

Landrus is an Associate Professor of Jazz Composition at Berklee College of Music

== Education ==
- Bachelor's Degree in Saxophone Performance, University of Nevada Reno, 2002
- Master of Music Degree in Jazz Saxophone, New England Conservatory, 2007
- Master of Music Degree in Jazz Composition, New England Conservatory, 2007
- PhD in Music Composition, Rutgers University, 2019

Main source:

== Awards ==
- Rising star, miscellaneous instruments (bass clarinet), in DownBeat magazine's Critics' Poll in 2021
- Rising star, baritone saxophone, in DownBeat magazine's Critics' Poll in 2015

== Praise for Brian Landus ==
The Boston Globe reviewer of his 2011 album Capsule wrote that the album, "which includes pianist Michael Cain (mostly on Fender Rhodes), guitar Nir Felder, bassist Matthew Parish, and drummer Rudy Royston, makes an organic fusion that ignores the boundaries that supposedly separate jazz, rock, pop, and R&B". His 2015 album The Deep Below was described by The New York Times as "a sonic register: low and deep, Mr. Landrus's natural range on baritone saxophone, bass saxophone, bass flute and bass clarinet".

== Discography ==
=== As leader ===
- Red List (Palmetto, 2022)
- For Now (BlueLand, 2020)
- Generations (BlueLand, 2017)
- The Deep Below(Palmetto/BlueLand, 2015)
- Mirage (BlueLand, 2013)
- Capsule (BlueLand, 2011)
- Traverse (BlueLand, 2010)
- Everlasting (CIMP, 2009)
- Forward (Cadence Jazz, 2008)

=== As sideman ===
- Ken Schaphorst, How to Say Goodbye (JCA)
- Nicholas Urie, My Garden (Red Piano)

Main source:
