= Dan Block =

American jazz clarinetist

- Born: Daniel Block
- Origin: St. Louis, Missouri, U.S.
- Genres: Jazz
- Instruments: Clarinet

Daniel Block is an American jazz clarinetist who has worked with artists such as Charles Mingus, Toshiko Akiyoshi and Gerry Mulligan. He is a member of the Marty Grosz Band, and also can be found in the pits of various Broadway shows in New York City.

== Early life and education ==
Block is a native of St. Louis. He earned a Bachelor of Music and Master of Music from the Juilliard School.

== Career ==
As a student at Juilliard, Block became involved in the New York City jazz scene. He participated in the recording process of Something Like a Bird. After graduating from Juilliard, Block joined Skah Shah, a Haitian band, and has since performed with several prominent jazz musicians.
