= New West Guitar Group =

New West Guitar Group is a guitar trio that was formed in 2003. The three group members—Perry Smith of New York City, John Storie of Los Angeles, and Jeffrey Stein of New York City—met while they were students at the University of Southern California's Thornton School of Music, where they studied jazz guitar. The trio started as a quartet at USC.

== Discography ==
- Introducing: New West Guitar Quartet (Flora, 2005)
- Thornton Retrospective (2006)
- Wide Awake (Artsong, 2007)
- Sleeping Lady (self-released, 2009)
- Round Trip Ticket (Summit, 2011)
- Big City (Summit, 2013)
- Send One Your Love (Summit, 2015)
