= Miles High Records =

Miles High Records, is an independent jazz record label founded in 2010 by vibraphonist Mark Sherman.

The record label's subsidiary, Miles High Music Books, publishes music education books, most by Sherman, who is on the jazz faculty at The Juilliard School in Manhattan.

== Discography ==
- Dan Block, From His World to Mine (2010)
- Eddie Mendenhall, Cosign Meets Tangent (2011)
- Tim Horner, The Places We Feel Free(2012)
- Dan Block, Duality (2012)
- Tim Hegarty, Tribute (2014)
- Laura Perlman, Precious Moments (2016)
- Dan Block, Block Party (2018)
- Sinan Alimanović International Band, Lejla (2020)
