= José James =

American vocalist (born 1978)

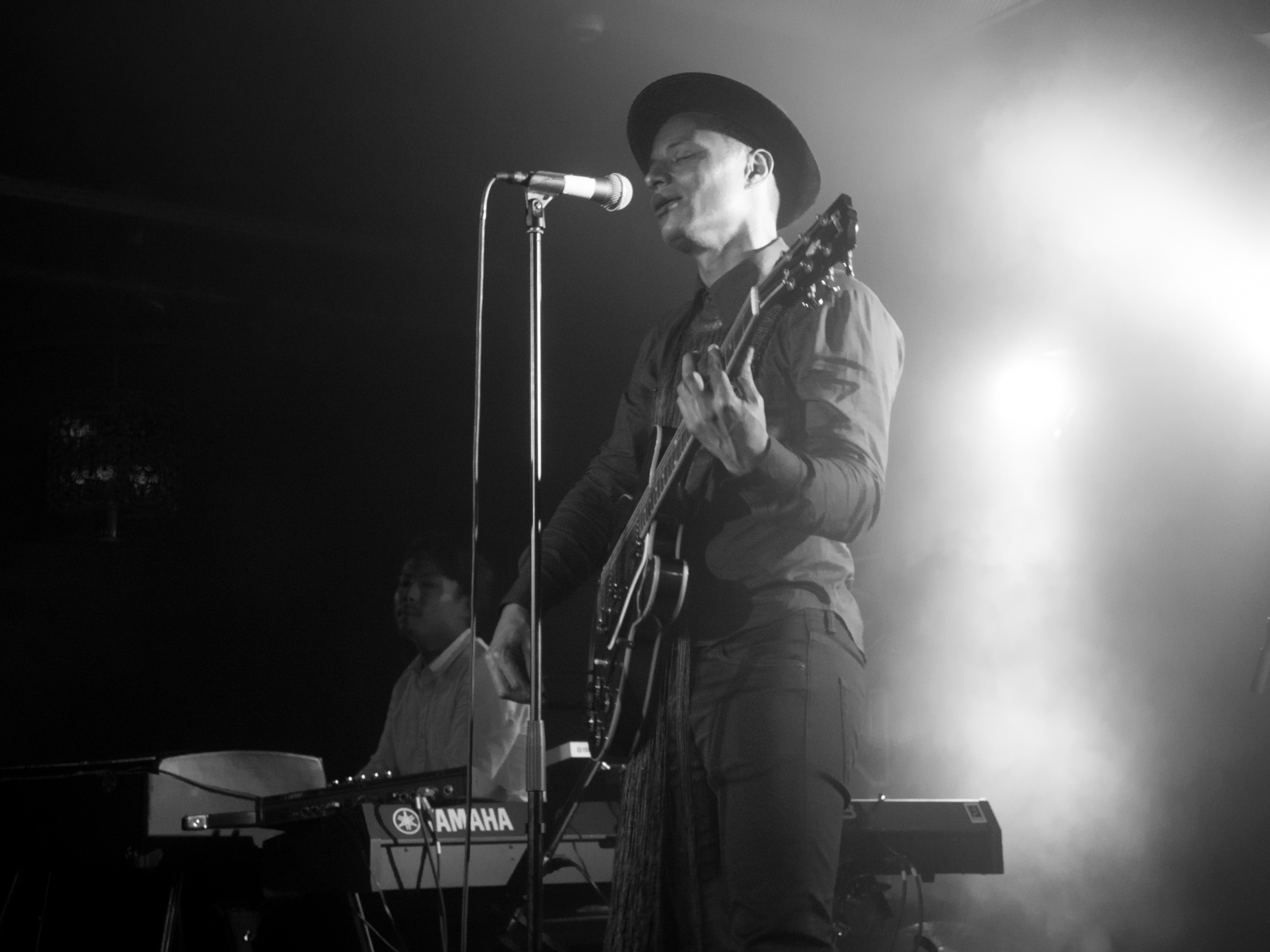
- José James 2016 in Berlin, Germany

Background information
- Born: January 20, 1978 (age 48); Minneapolis, Minnesota, United States
- Genres: Jazz, hip-hop, neo soul
- Occupations: Musician, composer, bandleader
- Instruments: Vocals, guitar
- Labels: Brownswood, Blue Note, Rainbow Blonde
- Website: josejamesmusic.com

José James (born January 20, 1978) is an American composer, baritone singer, guitar player and vocalist who combines contemporary jazz and hip-hop.

== Biography ==
José James, of Irish and Panamanian descent, attended The New School for Jazz and Contemporary Music. In 2008, he debuted with his first album, The Dreamer, achieving much success after DJ Gilles Peterson signed him to his new independent label Brownswood Recordings. His second album Blackmagic followed in 2009. And in the following year, the album For All We Know came out on the Impulse! label. For All We Know became the winner of both the Edison Award and the Académie du Jazz Grand Prix for best Vocal Jazz Album of 2010.

James has presented his work at venues such as The Kennedy Center, Hollywood Bowl, Ancienne Belgique and Billboard Live Tokyo. He has performed as a guest artist with McCoy Tyner, Laura Mvula and the Jazz at Lincoln Center, Melbourne Symphony and Royal Concertgebouw Orchestra in Amsterdam.

His latest project is called On & On - José James sings Badu, which was performed at Millennium stage on 22 October 2022 with his current band, composed of five young musicians. The Millennium stage is located at The Kennedy Center, which holds some of Washington, D.C.'s most important musical performances and plays.

== Personal life ==
José James is married to Talia Pnina Billig, known professionally as Taali, who is a Grammy Award–nominated singer, songwriter and record producer.

== Discography ==
=== As leader ===
- The Dreamer (Brownswood, 2007)
- Blackmagic (Brownswood, 2009)
- For All We Know with Jef Neve (impulse!, 2010)
- No Beginning No End (Blue Note, 2012)
- While You Were Sleeping (Blue Note, 2014)
- Yesterday I Had the Blues: The Music of Billie Holiday (Blue Note, 2015)
- Love in a Time of Madness (Blue Note, 2017)
- Lean On Me (Blue Note, 2018)
- No Beginning No End 2 (Rainbow Blonde, 2020)
- José James: New York 2020 (Rainbow Blonde, 2021)[2CD] – live recorded in 2020
- Merry Christmas from José James (Rainbow Blonde, 2021)
- On & On (Rainbow Blonde, 2023)
- 1978 (Rainbow Blonde, 2024)
- 1978: Revenge of the Dragon (Rainbow Blonde, 2025)

=== As guest ===
- Jazzanova, Little Bird (Verve Records, 2008)
- Basement Jaxx, Scars and Zephyr (XL Recordings, 2009)
- Kris Bowers, Heroes + Misfits (Concord Jazz, 2014)
- Takuya Kuroda, Rising Son (Blue Note, 2014)
- Junko Onishi, Very Special (Somethin' Cool, 2017)
- Taali, I Am Here (Rainbow Blonde, 2019)
- Erik Truffaz Quartet, Lune Rouge (Warner Music France, 2019)
- Moby, Always Centered at Night (Mute Records, 2024)
- Christian McBride, Without Further Ado, Vol 1 (Mack Avenue, 2025)
