= Steven Feifke =

American pianist

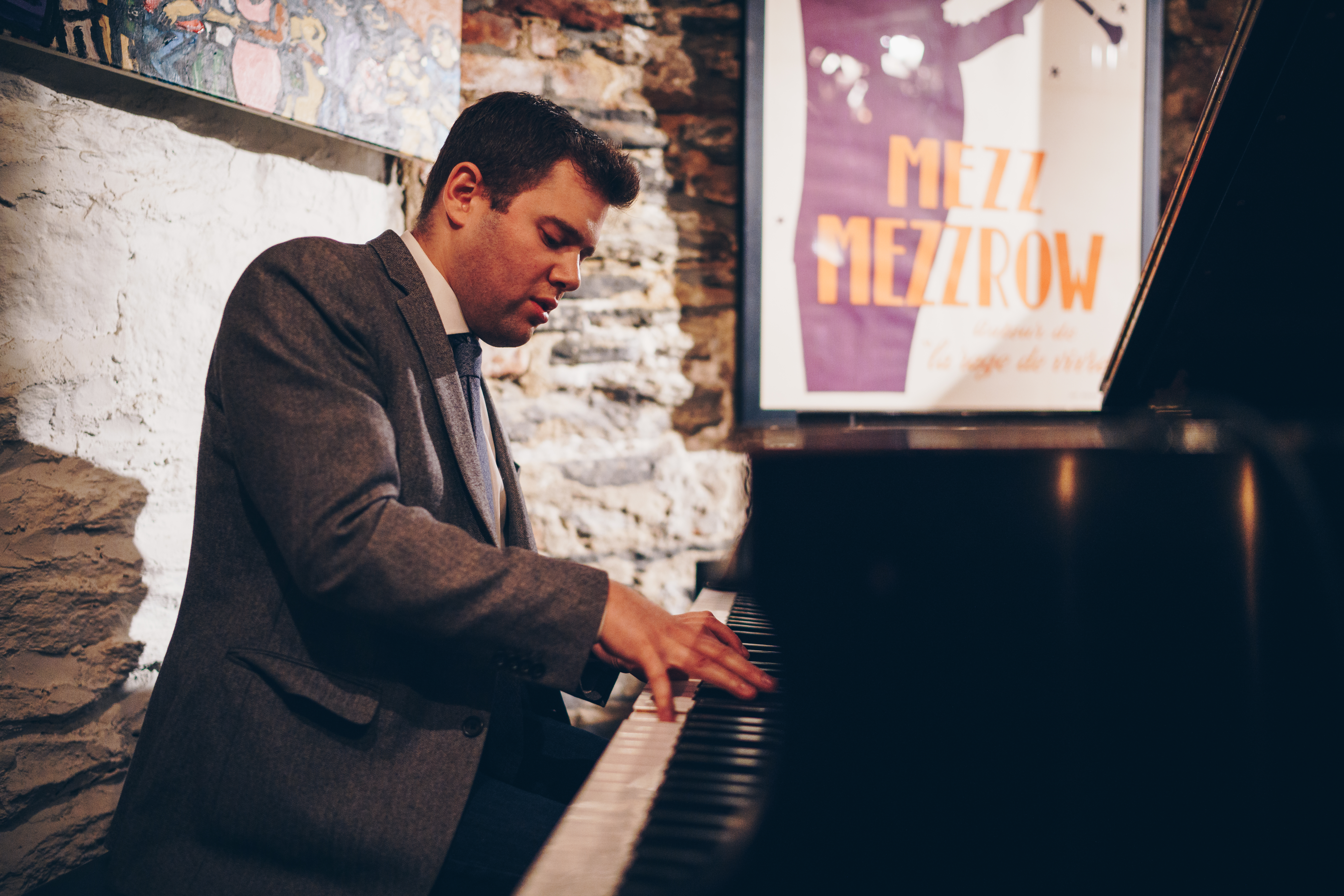
- Feifke at Mezzrow jazz club, 2019

Background information
- Born: June 21, 1991 (age 35); Lexington, Massachusetts, U.S.
- Genre: Jazz
- Occupations: Musician; composer; arranger; orchestrator
- Instrument: Piano
- Years active: 2010s–present
- Website: stevenfeifkemusic.com
- Education: New York University (BM, BA); Manhattan School of Music (MM)

Steven Feifke (/ˈfaɪf.ki/ FIFE-kee; born June 21, 1991) is an American jazz pianist, composer, arranger, and orchestrator. In 2023, at the 65th Annual Grammy Awards, he became the youngest musician to win the Grammy Award for Best Large Jazz Ensemble.

== Early life and education ==
Feifke was born in Lexington, Massachusetts. He attended Lexington High School and the New England Conservatory of Music Preparatory School. Following this, he attended New York University, where he received degrees in Jazz Studies and Economics. He obtained a Master of Music in Jazz Composition from the Manhattan School of Music.

== Career ==
Feifke lectured on orchestration and harmony at Yale University. He developed a curriculum which integrated the American civil rights movement with jazz pedagogy for Arts Mid-Hudson. Feifke also served as a Guest Artist-in-Residence at Moravian College. He serves on the faculty for the School for Jazz and Contemporary Music (The New School) and the Berklee College of Music.

He has performed with Chad Lefkowitz-Brown, Steve Tyrell, Santino Fontana, Randy Brecker, Benny Benack III, Bryan Carter, and Alexa Tarantino.

Feifke is a Yamaha Performing Artist.

== Composition ==
As a composer and orchestrator, Feifke has written for musicians such as Danny Janklow, Michael Dease, Ulysses Owens, Chris Norton, and Chad Lefkowitz-Brown. Feifke's debut album, Peace in Time, was released in 2015, featuring Andrew Gould and Jimmy Macbride.

Feifke has written original works for television and film media; his music can be heard on an episode of Jerry Seinfeld's hit Netflix show Comedians in Cars Getting Coffee, featuring former President Barack Obama. Feifke was commissioned by Catskill Jazz Factory to compose an orchestral piece that debuted at the New Generation Festival in Florence, Italy.

== Awards and competitions ==
- David Baker Prize of the Ravinia Music Festival
- Second place in the BMI Foundation Charlie Parker Jazz Composition Prize
- Two-time semi-finalist in the Thelonious Monk Jazz Competition

== Discography ==
=== As leader ===
Album artist	Title	Year	Label
Steven Feifke	Peace in Time	2015	Independent
Benny Benack III & Steven Feifke	Season's Swingin' Greetings	2019	Ring Road Recordings
Steven Feifke	Kinetic	2021	Outside in Music

=== As sideman ===
Album artist	Title	Year	Label	Notes
The 8-Bit Big Band	Backwards Compatible	2021	Independent	Sideman
Raviv Markovitz	Pulse	2020	Independent	Sideman
Chad LB Virtual Big Band	Quarantine Standards	2020	Sound Frame	Sideman, arranger
Alexa Tarantino	Clarity	2020	Posi-Tone	Sideman, composer
John Lake	Seven Angles	2020	Outside In Music	Sideman
Danny Janklow	World's Collide	2019	Outside in Music	Sideman
Chad Lefkowitz-Brown and Sonic Magic	Live at the Bridge	2019	Independent	Sideman
The 8-Bit Big Band	Choose Your Character!	2019	Independent	Sideman
The Birdland Big Band	The Birdland Big Band Live!	2018	Birdland Records	Arranger
Chad Lefkowitz-Brown	Standard Sessions	2018	Independent	Sideman
Andrew Gould	First Things First	2018	Outside in Music	Sideman, composer
Chris Norton	Mr. Chris Norton	2018	Unknown	Arranger
OSU Jazz Orchestra	Solid Gold	2018	Oklahoma State University Jazz Studies	Arranger
Alexander Claffy	Standards: What Are You Doing with Your Life?	2018	SMK Jazz	Arranger
The 8-Bit Big Band	Press Start!	2018	Independent	Sideman
Joe Benjamin and a Mighty Handful	Swing Migration	2017	Independent	Arranger
Ulysses Owens	Falling Forward	2017	Spice of Life Records	Sideman
Gordon Webster ft. Charles Turner	This.	2017	Independent	Arranger
Chad Lefkowitz-Brown	Onward	2017	Independent	Sideman, arranger
Matthew Muneses	Threshold	2015	Independent	Sideman
Bryan Carter Big Band	Teaching Music Through Performance in Jazz	2016	Independent	Sideman
New Century Jazz Quintet	In Case You Missed Us	2015	Vivid Sound	Arranger
Jeremy Cicurel	Is It You: A Tribute to Ray Cicurel	2015	Independent	Sideman
Derek Ganong	Of Lesser Parts	2013	Independent	Sideman
