= Myron Cope =

American sports journalist (1929–2008)

- Cope during his final radio show in 1995
- Born: Myron Sidney Kopelman; January 23, 1929; Pittsburgh, Pennsylvania, U.S.
- Died: February 27, 2008 (aged 79); Mt. Lebanon, Pennsylvania, U.S.
- Known for: 5× Super Bowl champion (IX, X, XIII, XIV, XL); 6× AFC champion 1974, 1975, 1978, 1979, 1995, 2005
- Sports commentary career
- Team: Pittsburgh Steelers
- Sport: American football

Myron Sidney Kopelman (January 23, 1929 – February 27, 2008), known professionally as Myron Cope, was an American sports journalist, radio personality, and sportscaster. He is best known for being "the voice of the Pittsburgh Steelers".

Cope was a color commentator for the Steelers' radio broadcasts for 35 years. He was known for his distinctive, higher-pitched nasally voice with an identifiable Pittsburgh accent, idiosyncratic speech pattern, and a level of excitement rarely exhibited in the broadcast booth. Cope's most notable catch phrase was "yoi" /ˈjɔɪ/. He helped popularize the Terrible Towel, a rally towel associated with the Steelers. In 1996, Cope gave the rights to the towel to Allegheny Valley School, which has received more than $6 million in proceeds from towel sales.

Cope was the first football announcer inducted into the National Radio Hall of Fame. Cope's autobiography, Double Yoi!, was published in 2002.

== Education and career ==
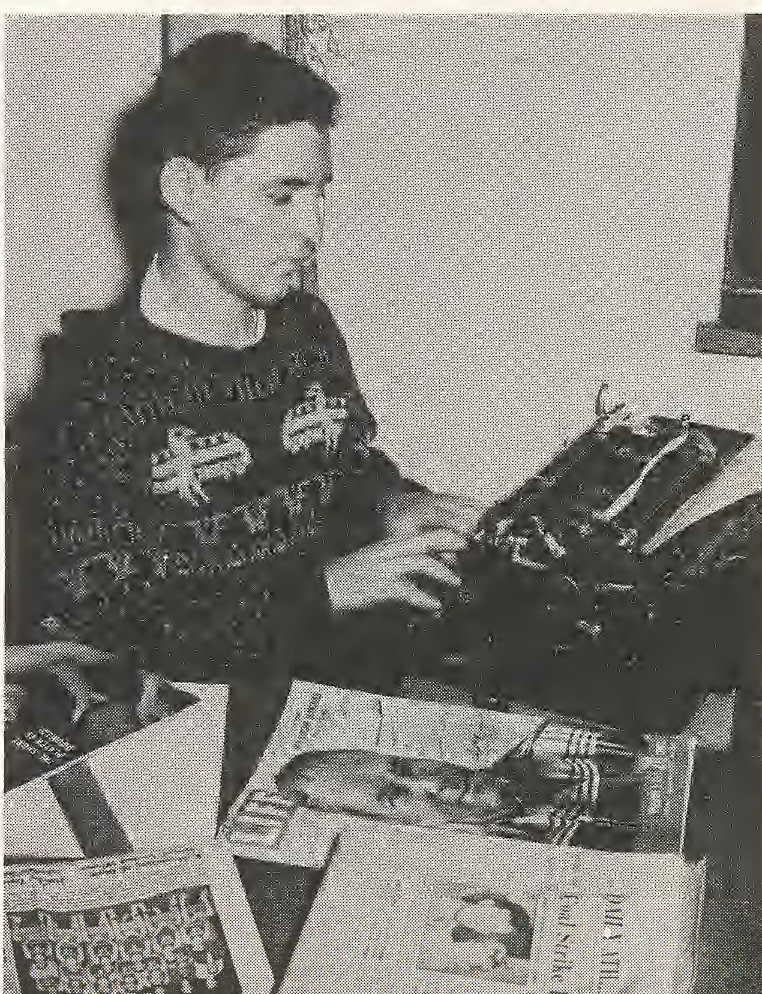
Cope as a student at the University of Pittsburgh in 1950

Born in Pittsburgh, Pennsylvania, to Jewish parents of Lithuanian ancestry, Cope graduated from Taylor Allderdice High School in 1947 and was inducted into their alumni hall of fame in 2009. He also graduated from the University of Pittsburgh.

Cope was originally a journalist before becoming a broadcaster. His first job as a journalist was in Erie, Pennsylvania, with the Daily Times, and by the summer of 1951, he was working for the Pittsburgh Post-Gazette. Cope then became a freelance journalist, most notably for Sports Illustrated, the Saturday Evening Post, and the Pittsburgh Post-Gazette. In 1963, Cope received the E.P. Dutton Prize for "Best Magazine Sportswriting in the Nation", for a portrayal of Cassius Clay. Cope spent the 1983 college football season as a color analyst for the Pittsburgh Panthers. In 1987, he was named by the Hearst Corporation as a noted literary achiever, along with Mark Twain, Jack London, Frederic Remington, Walter Winchell, and Sidney Sheldon. At its 50th anniversary, Sports Illustrated selected Cope's profile of Howard Cosell as one of the 50 best written works ever published in the magazine.

== Steelers broadcasting ==
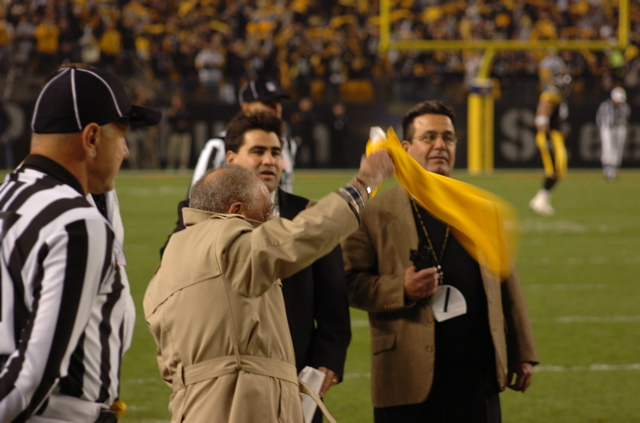
Cope waves a Terrible Towel at Heinz Field – October 31, 2005

In 1968, Cope began doing daily sports commentaries on what was then WTAE-AM radio in Pittsburgh. His unique nasal voice, with a distinctive Pittsburgh area accent, was noticed by the Steelers' brass, and he made his debut as a member of the Steelers' radio team in 1970.

During Cope's 35-year broadcasting career with the Steelers—the second longest term with a single team in NFL history, he was accompanied by only two play-by-play announcers: Jack Fleming, with whom he broadcast until 1994, and Bill Hillgrove.

In keeping with his comic personality, a series of television commentaries on WTAE-TV saw Cope calling himself "Doctor Cope" and wearing a white lab coat while pretending to examine the opposing team's strengths and weaknesses. His predictor was known as the "Cope-ra-scope."

In his last seven years, Cope would work alongside former Steelers offensive tackle Tunch Ilkin in the booth and help groom him for his own broadcasting career. Ilkin, upon his own retirement in 2021 due to complications from ALS (which he would later die from on September 4, 2021), later joked that while he learned a lot from riding in the car with Cope for away games, Cope primarily rode with him because he allowed Cope to smoke cigarettes in the car. Ilkin would eventually serve as a de facto replacement for Cope following Cope's retirement.

=== Catchphrases and nicknames ===
Like other sports announcers in Pittsburgh, particularly Penguins commentator Mike Lange and the late Pirates announcer Bob Prince, Cope had a repertoire of unique catchphrases employed in his broadcasts, such as "Mmm-Hah!" (when he loses his train of thought, or forgets a player's name) and "Okel Dokel" (his version of "okey dokey"). Cope often used Yiddish expressions, especially "Feh!" and "Yoi!" (sometimes multiplied as "Double Yoi" or rarely "Triple Yoi").

Cope also created nicknames for many players and opposing teams. It was Cope who popularized "The Bus" as a nickname for former Steelers running back Jerome Bettis, "Jack Splat" for Jack Lambert, and he gave Kordell Stewart the nickname "Slash."

Cope also used the term "Cincinnati Bungles" to describe their division rivals, known during the 1990s for a string of bad seasons and numerous draft busts. Myron also used terms such as "Brownies", "Birdies", "Yonkos", "Cryboys", and "Redfaces" for the football teams from Cleveland, Baltimore, Denver, Dallas, Washington, D.C., in respective order.

Cope was noted for accusing future Hall of Famer Roberto Clemente of being "baseball's champion hypochondriac".

== Terrible Towel ==
I said, what we need is something that everybody already has, so it doesn't cost a dime. So I says, 'We'll urge people to bring out to the game gold or black towels,' then I'll tell people if you don't have a yellow, black or gold towel, buy one. And if you don't want to buy one, dye one. We'll call this the Terrible Towel.

— Myron Cope on the invention of the Terrible Towel

Cope played a large role in the invention of the Terrible Towel. Needing a way to excite the fans during a 1975 playoff game against the Baltimore Colts, Cope urged fans to take yellow dish towels to the game and wave them throughout. Originally, Cope wanted to sell rubber Jack Lambert masks, but realizing the high costs for the masks, opted for the inexpensive option for the Terrible Towel. The Terrible Towel has gained much popularity since its invention and "is arguably the best-known fan symbol of any major pro sports team". The catchphrase is: "The Terrible Towel is poised to strike, and so are The Steelers."

In 1996, Cope gave the rights to The Terrible Towel to the Allegheny Valley School in Coraopolis, Pennsylvania. The school provides care for more than 900 people with intellectual disabilities and physical disabilities, including Cope's son who has severe autism. Proceeds from the Terrible Towel have helped raise $6 million for the school.

== Family life ==
Cope married Mildred Lindberg of Charleston in 1965, and the couple moved to Mt. Lebanon. In 1972, the Copes moved to nearby Upper St. Clair. Mildred died on September 20, 1994. In 1999, Cope moved back to Mt. Lebanon, to a condo in the Woodridge neighborhood. He remained there until his final days, when he entered a Mt. Lebanon nursing home.

Cope had three children, Elizabeth, Martha Ann, and Daniel. Martha Ann died shortly after her birth. His son, Daniel, was born with severe autism; he has lived most of his life at the Allegheny Valley School, an institution specializing in intellectual developmental disabilities. Cope devoted much of his time and energy to Pittsburgh causes addressing autism, and spoke candidly about his experiences as the parent of a child with autism and his efforts to better educate the public at large about autism.

== Retirement and death ==
A special edition of "The Terrible Towel" was created in honor of Cope's retirement following the 2005 Steelers' season.

Cope announced his retirement from broadcasting on June 20, 2005, citing health concerns. Eight days later, it was announced that Cope was the recipient of the Pete Rozelle Award for "long-time exceptional contributions to radio and television in professional football." Upon his retirement, the Steelers did not replace Cope, opting instead to downsize to a two-man broadcast team.

On October 31, 2005, Cope was honored for his lifetime accomplishments at halftime of the contest between the Steelers and the Ravens. In addition, the Steelers produced a special commemorative edition Terrible Towel with his familiar expressions printed on it. As seen on the towel, production was limited to 35,000 towels, representing 35 years of service to the Steelers. Later that season when the team advanced to Super Bowl XL, many Steelers fans wanted Cope to come out of retirement just to call "The one for the thumb." Cope declined partially for health reasons and partially to enjoy retirement.

A longtime heavy smoker, Cope died of respiratory failure at a Mt. Lebanon nursing home on the morning of February 27, 2008. In the days following his death, many ceremonies were held in his honor, including the local sporting events of the Pittsburgh Panthers college basketball team. Two days after his death, hundreds of people gathered in heavy snow in front of the Pittsburgh City Hall to honor Cope; included in the ceremony was one minute of silent Terrible Towel waving. His funeral, which was held on February 29, 2008, was private. Due to Cope's large impact on the Pittsburgh area, Bob Smizik, a local sportswriter wrote,

Had the secret of the service and its site not been kept, ... tens of thousands would have descended on the Slater funeral home in Green Tree. Such was the affection for Cope, ... that the parkway in both directions would have been clogged. Greentree and Cochran roads, the two main arteries leading to the funeral home, would have been parking lots.

== List of awards and honors ==
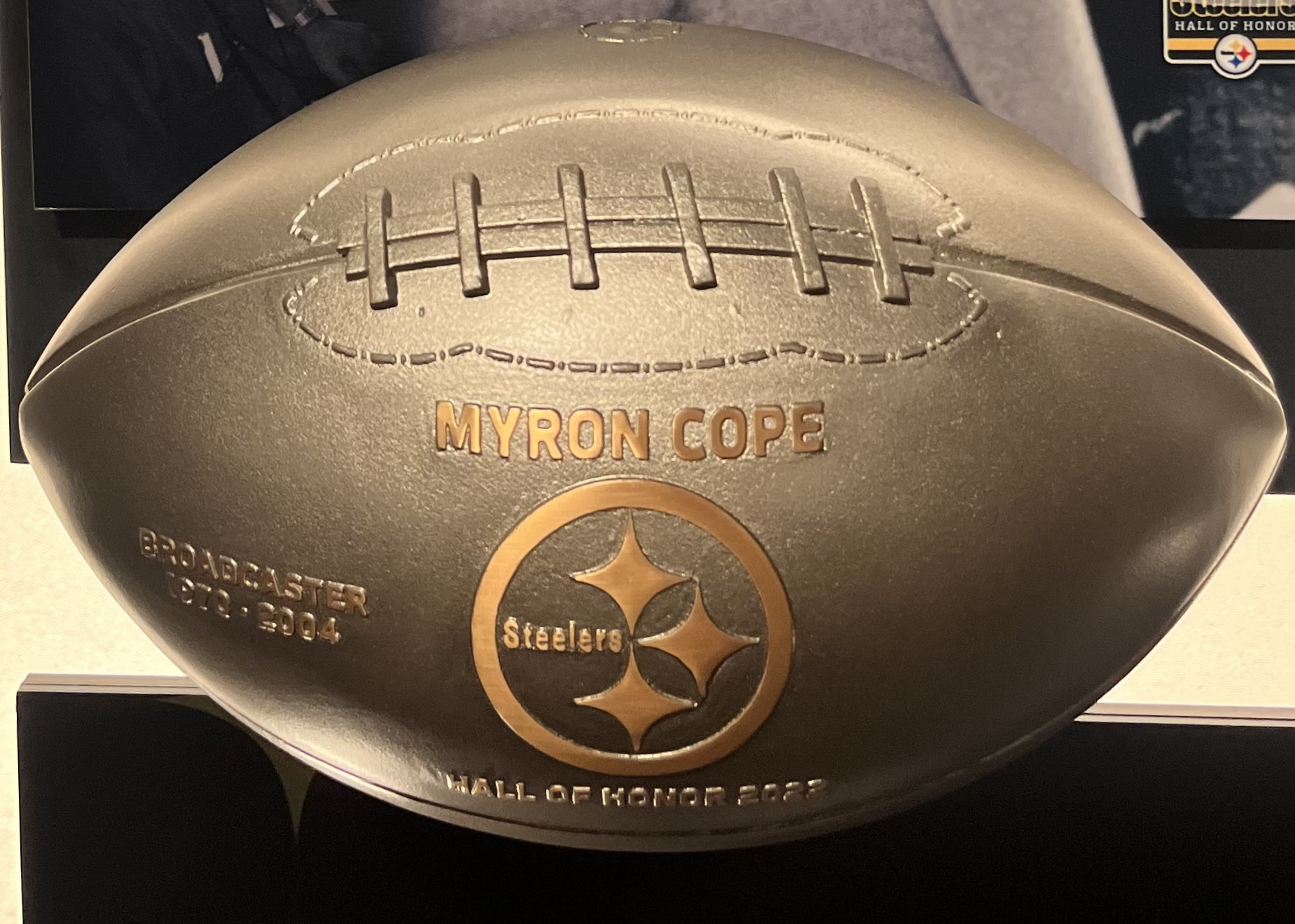
Football in the Steelers Hall of Honor dedicated to Cope, 2023

Cope received many awards and honors, including:

- 1963 – E.P. Dutton Prize for "Best Magazine Sportswriting in the Nation" for his portrayal of Cassius Clay
- 1987 – Named as a noted literary achiever by Hearst Corporation
- 2004 – His profile of Howard Cosell was selected as one of 50 all-time classic articles by Sports Illustrated
- 2005 – Became the first pro football announcer elected to the Radio Hall of Fame, he is the only sportscaster inducted who is not best known as a baseball announcer.
- 2005 – Pete Rozelle Radio-Television Award for long-time exceptional contributions to pro football in television and radio
- 2015 – Pittsburgh Pro Football Hall of Fame
- 2022 - Pittsburgh Steelers Hall of Honor
- Held the title of "special contributor" at Sports Illustrated
- Served as a board member of the Pittsburgh chapter of the Autism Society of America and the Pittsburgh Vintage Grand Prix
- Co-founded the Myron Cope/Foge Fazio Golf Tournament for Autistic Children
- The only broadcaster appointed to the Pro Football Hall of Fame's Board of Selectors, serving for 10 years
- The asteroid 7835 Myroncope was named in his honor in 2008.

== Bibliography ==
- Brown, Jim; Myron Cope (1964). Off My Chest. Doubleday. p. 230. (Jim Brown's autobiography)
- Cope, Myron (1968). Broken Cigars. Prentice-Hall. p. 275. (collection of articles)
- Cope, Myron (1970). The Game that was: The Early Days of Pro Football (edition 1 ed.). World Publishing Company. p. 294.
- Cope, Myron (1974). The Game that was: An Illustrated Account of the Tumultuous Early Days of Pro Football (edition 2 ed.). Crowell. p. 253. ISBN 0-690-00586-5.
- Cope, Myron (2002). Double Yoi! (edition 1 ed.). Sports Publishing, L.L.C. p. 229. ISBN 1-58261-548-9.(autobiography)
- Cope, Myron (2006). Double Yoi! (edition 2 ed.). Sports Publishing, L.L.C. pp. 229. ISBN 1-59670-069-6.(autobiography)

== See also ==
- Steeler Nation
- Pittsburgh Steelerettes
- Steely McBeam
