= Alexa Tarantino =

American jazz musician

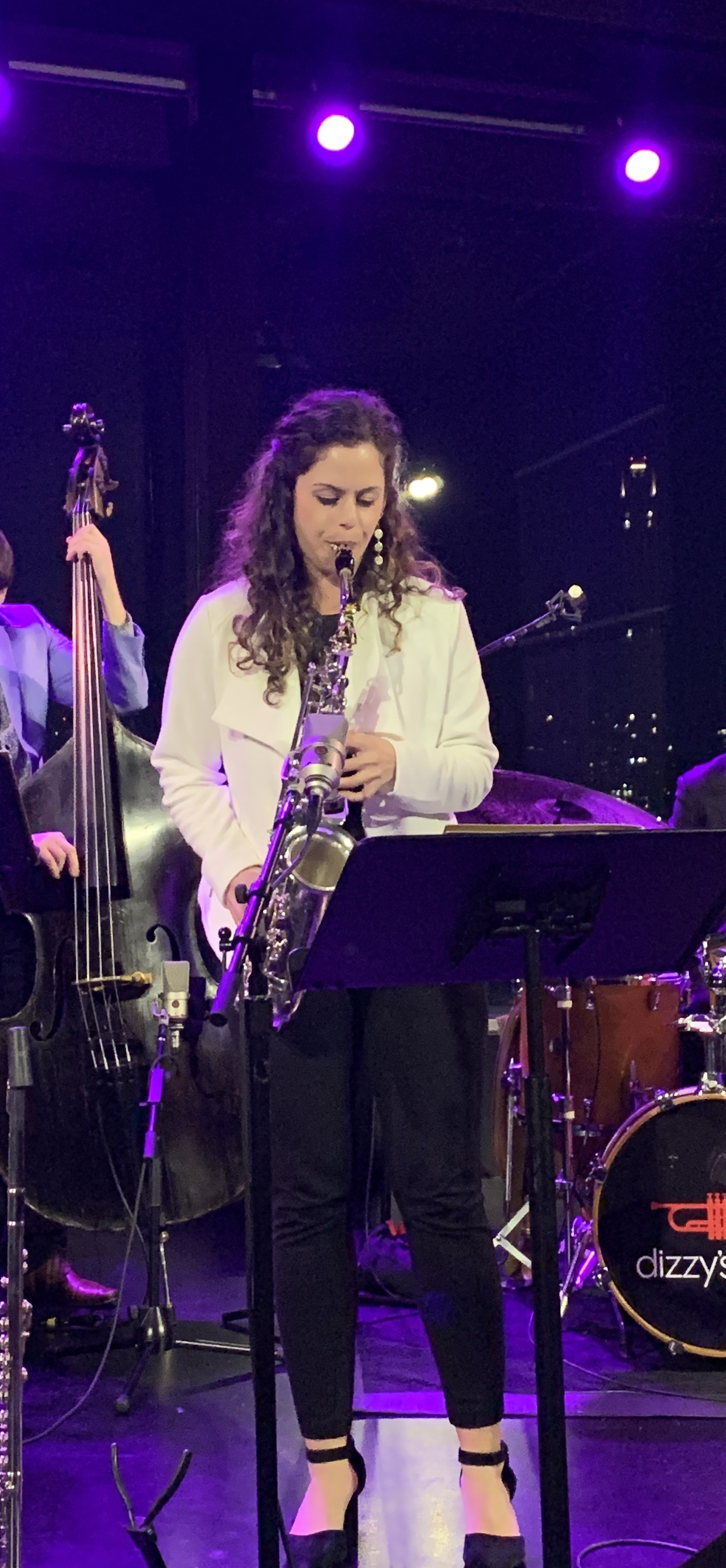
- Tarantino at Dizzy's Club in 2020

Background information
- Genre: Jazz
- Occupation: Musician
- Instruments: Saxophone; clarinet; flute
- Years active: 2010s–present
- Label: Posi-Tone
- Member of: Jazz at Lincoln Center Orchestra
- Website: alexatarantino.com

Alexa Tarantino is an American jazz saxophonist, woodwind doubler, composer, and educator.

== Early life and education ==
Alexa Tarantino obtained a bachelor's degree in Jazz Saxophone Performance and Music Education along with a Certificate in Arts Leadership from the Eastman School of Music in Rochester, New York. She received her master's degree in Jazz Studies from The Juilliard School.

== Personal life ==
Tarantino is married to pianist, arranger, and composer Steven Feifke.

== Musical career ==
She has performed with Sherrie Maricle and the DIVA Jazz Orchestra, the Jazz at Lincoln Center Orchestra, Darcy James Argue's Secret Society, Wynton Marsalis, Arturo O'Farrill and the Afro Latin Jazz Orchestra, and Cécile McLorin Salvant, among others.

Tarantino's most recent album, Firefly, was released on Posi-Tone Records in 2021 and reached No. 7 on the JazzWeek Charts. Her second album as leader, Clarity, was also released by Posi-Tone. On it, she plays alto and soprano saxophones, flute, and alto flute. Tarantino's debut album as leader, Winds of Change, was released by Posi-Tone Records in 2019, and reached No. 15 on the JazzWeek charts and No. 79 on the 2019 JazzWeek Top 100. The personnel on this album included Ulysses Owens Jr. (drums), Christian Sands (piano), Joe Martin (bass), and Nick Finzer (trombone).

Tarantino was nominated for "Rising Star – Alto Saxophone" by Downbeat Magazine's Critics' Poll in 2021 and 2020, while JazzTimes Critics' Poll named her one of the "Top 5 Alto Saxophonists of 2019". She has also worked extensively with pianist Steven Feifke. In 2021, Tarantino was a recipient of the Jazz Coalition Fund.

== Discography ==
=== As leader/co-leader ===
Year released	Title	Label	Personnel/Notes
2015	Crossing Paths	Infinite Records	Released as a co-leader with pianist Dariusz Terefenko. Composer, "Crossing Paths," "Final Breath," Co-Arranger, Alto Saxophone. Released on Infinite Records, label founded by Tarantino in 2015.
2019	Winds of Change	Posi-Tone	Quintet featuring Christian Sands (piano), Joe Martin (bass), Rudy Royston (drums), Nick Finzer (trombone). Composer/arranger, Alto and soprano saxophones, Alto flute
2020	Clarity	Posi-Tone	Quartet featuring Steven Feifke (piano), Joe Martin (bass), Rudy Royston (drums). Composer/arranger, alto and soprano saxophones, flute and alto flute
2021	Firefly	Posi-Tone	Quintet featuring Art Hirahara (piano), Boris Kozlov (bass), Rudy Royston (drums) Behn Gillece (vibraphone). Composer/arranger, alto and soprano saxophones, flute and alto flute, clarinet.

=== As sidewoman ===
Year released	Leader	Title	Label	Notes
2013	Colossus Large Ensemble	Colossus	Independent	Alto saxophone, clarinet
2015	Dariuzs Terenfenko	Crossing Paths	Infinite Records	Composer "Crossing Paths," "Final Breaths," co-arranger, alto saxophone
2017	The DIVA Jazz Orchestra	Diva: 25th Anniversary	Artist Share	Alto and soprano saxophones, composer/arranger/featured soloist "Square One," featured soloist "Seesaw"
2017	The DIVA Jazz Orchestra	Diva + The Boys	MCG Jazz	Alto saxophone, soprano saxophone, flute, clarinet
2018	Arturo O'Farrill & the Afro Latin Jazz Orchestra	Fandango at the Wall: A Soundtrack for the United States, Mexico, and Beyond	Resilience Music Alliance	Alto and soprano saxophones, flute
2018	Lauren Sevian	Bliss	Posi-Tone	Alto saxophone
2018	The Verve Jazz Ensemble	Connect the Dots	Lightgroove Media	Alto saxophone, flute
2019	Something Blue	Maximum Enjoyment	Posi-Tone	Alto saxophone
2019	Lioness	Pride & Joy	Posi-Tone	Alto saxophone, composer/arranger "Hurry Up and Wait"
2019	Chris Teal	Analog Dreams	Outside-In Music	Alto saxophone
2019	The Verve Jazz Ensemble	Night Mode	Lightgroove Media	Alto saxophone, alto flute
2020	Works for Me	Reach Within	Posi-Tone	Alto saxophone, alto flute
2020	Posi-Tone Records Collective	Tales of Wonder: A Celebration of Stevie	Posi-Tone	Alto saxophone (track one only)
2021	Ulysses Owens Jr.	Soul Conversations	Outside-In Music	Alto saxophone
2021	Steven Feifke	Kinetic	Outside-In Music	Alto saxophone
2021	KIMBROUGH Ensemble	KIMBROUGH	Newvelle Records	Alto saxophone
2022	Cécile McLorin Salvant	Ghost Song	Nonesuch	Flute
