= Live at the Village Vanguard (2015 Christian McBride album) =

Live album by Christian McBride
- Released: September 18, 2015
- Recorded: December 12–14, 2014
- Venue: Village Vanguard
- Genre: Jazz
- Length: 68:27
- Label: Mack Avenue MAC 1099
- Producer: Christian McBride, Maria Ehrenreich

Christian McBride chronology
Out Here (2013)	Live at the Village Vanguard (2015)	Flaga: Book of Angels Volume 27 (2016)

Professional ratings
Review scores
Source	Rating
Jazz Forum	5/5 stars
RTÉ.ie	2.5/5 stars
Tom Hull	B+

Live at the Village Vanguard is a live album by American jazz bassist Christian McBride. It was recorded over three consecutive nights in December 2014 at the famous jazz club Village Vanguard in New York City and released on September 18, 2015 via Mack Avenue label. The cover of "Cherokee" featured in the album won the Grammy Award for Best Improvised Jazz Solo at the 58th Annual Grammy Awards in 2016. This is the thirteenth full-length album recorded under his leadership.

== Reception ==
Colin Fleming of JazzTimes noted "Cutting an album at the Village Vanguard is both a rite of passage and an attempt to take one’s own place in a particularly hallowed hall of live recordings. But it’s evident here, with the opening take of Wes Montgomery’s “Fried Pies,” that Christian McBride’s trio is more than capable of advancing on both fronts. McBride dubs drummer Ulysses Owens Jr. his American Express, as he’s loath to leave home without him, and with the kick the man provides it’s no wonder. The opener has a taut, bracing solo that pianist Christian Sands helps transition into a percussive duet before the central refrain comes roaring back in, McBride’s bass encircling the driving progressions of his counterparts".

On Audiophilia.com Anthony Kershaw wrote "Typical of McBride, the charts are hard driving and swing. There's lots of technique on show, but great musicianship and musicality, too. The audience loves it and you can feel the energy in the room... This album has a lot of his debut album's energy. His improvisational style has developed, especially on ballads, but his ingenue talent was so well defined in 1994 that this album is simply an emphasis on it. There was a lot to love from the beginning. Live at the Village Vanguard has a nice mix of up tempo original charts, standards (The Lady Of My Life, Cherokee, Down By The Riverside), covers and ballads."

== Track listing ==
No.	Title	Writer(s)	Length
1.	"Fried Pies"	Wes Montgomery	9:13
2.	"Band Introduction"		2:37
3.	"Interlude"	J.J. Johnson	7:18
4.	"Sand Dune"	Christian Sands	9:06
5.	"The Lady in My Life"	Rod Temperton	6:55
6.	"Cherokee"	Ray Noble	8:43
7.	"Good Morning Heartache"	Ervin Drake, Dan Fisher, Irene Higginbotham	10:34
8.	"Down by the Riverside"	Traditional	6:48
9.	"Car Wash"	Norman Whitfield	7:13
Total length:			68:27

== Personnel ==
Band

- Christian McBride – bass
- Christian Sands – piano
- Ulysses Owens – drums

Production

- Keith H. Brown – illustrations
- Christian McBride – producer
- Randall Kennedy – creative director
- Raj Naik – art direction, design
- Trevor Smith – photography
- Gretchen Valade – executive producer
- Todd Whitelock – mixing
- Mark Wilder – mastering

== Chart performance ==
Chart (2015)	Peak position
US Jazz Albums (Billboard)	10
