= Bryan Carter =

American drummer & vocalist (born 1990)

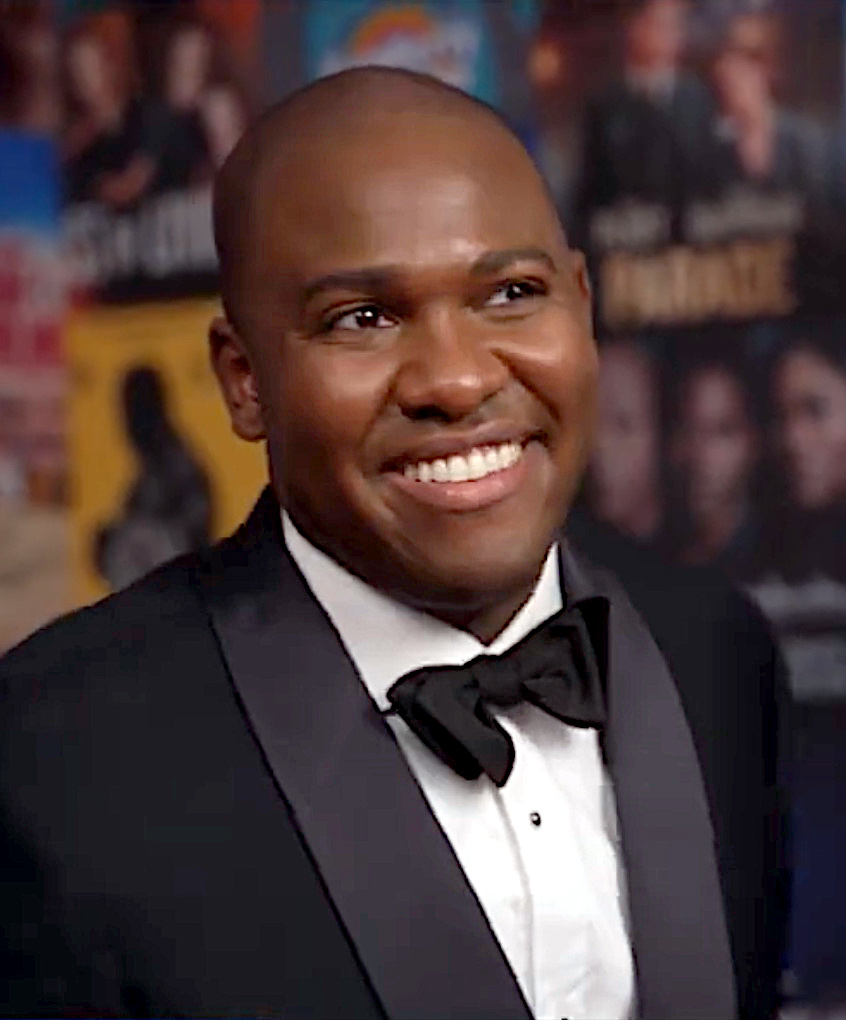
- Carter at the 76th Tony Awards in 2023

Background information
- Born: July 11, 1990 (age 36); St. Louis, Missouri
- Origin: New York City
- Genres: Jazz
- Occupations: drummer, vocalist, composer, arranger, orchestrator, bandleader
- Labels: Bandstand Presents, La Reserve
- Website: www.bryancartermusic.com

Bryan Carter (born July 11, 1990, in St. Louis, Missouri) is an American drummer, vocalist, composer, arranger, orchestrator and bandleader. In 2023, he and Charlie Rosen won the Tony Award for Best Orchestrations for Some Like It Hot. In 2024, he and Charlie Rosen won the Grammy Award for Best Musical Theatre Album for co-producing the cast album. In 2026, he won the Grammy Award for Best Arrangement, Instrumental or A Cappella alongside Charlie Rosen and Matthew Whitaker.

== Early life and education ==
Bryan Carter was born in St. Louis, Missouri. He was introduced to the drums by his father at the age of two. He began his formal musical training on the violin at the age of four using the Suzuki method. Carter was raised in Sycamore, Illinois and attended Sycamore High School. While in high school he was a part of The Gibson/Baldwin Grammy Jazz Ensemble where he met future collaborators Emmet Cohen, Benny Benack III, Grace Kelly, Cody Fry and Chad Lefkowitz-Brown.

Carter attended The Juilliard School in New York City, receiving a Bachelor of Music in 2012.

== Career ==
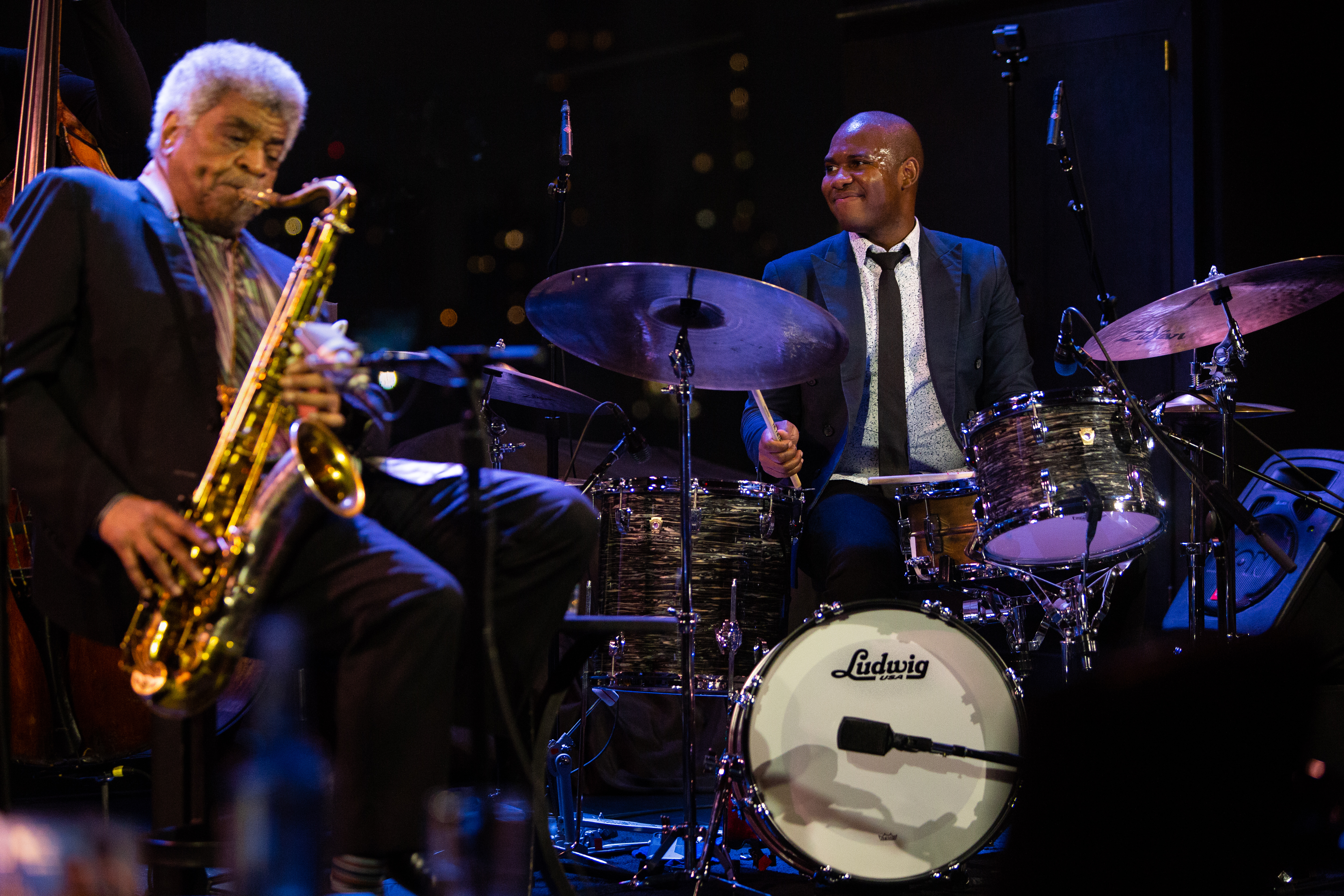
Carter with NEA Jazz Master George Coleman

=== Music ===
Bryan Carter is primarily known for his work in Jazz and Improvisational music. He has performed/recorded with Wynton Marsalis, Jon Batiste, Kenny Barron, McCoy Tyner, Marcus Roberts, Kurt Elling, Kris Bowers, Steven Feifke, Emmet Cohen, Braxton Cook, Marquis Hill, Veronica Swift, Martina DaSilva, Michael Feinstein and Steve Tyrell.

As a bandleader, Carter tours with his band, “Bryan Carter & The Swangers” as well as its “concert-driven” counterpart, “The Swangers Orchestra.

In 2024, Bryan Carter premiered his seven-movement jazz oratorio titled "Rustin in Renaissance" at Jazz at Lincoln Center's Appel Room. The piece highlights the life of civil rights pioneer Bayard Rustin and is scored for a 35-piece ensemble with four featured vocalists. It received critical acclaim, with Will Friedwald of the New York Sun stating, "Carter is the young musician who, in the current century, is doing the best job of anyone at navigating between the worlds of jazz and musical theater... He's the perfect individual to mastermind an evening of music dedicated to Bayard Rustin".

In 2026, he won the Grammy Award for Best Arrangement, Instrumental or A Cappella for "Super Mario Praise Break" alongside Charlie Rosen and Matthew Whitaker.

=== Theatre ===
In 2012 Bryan Carter was cast in Kyle Riabko’s “What’s it all About: Bacharach Reimagined” musical-workshop where he starred alongside Charlie Rosen, Daniel Bailen, Laura Dreyfuss and Ariana Debose. In 2022, Carter contributed additional orchestrations to Michael R. Jackson's Pulitzer Prize winning musical, “A Strange Loop”. He co-orchestrated “Some Like It Hot”, a Broadway musical based on the film of the same name. He has as performed with Tituss Burgess, Laura Osnes, Gavin Creel, Kristin Chenoweth, and Aaron Tveit.

Bryan Carter is the first black orchestrator to win the "Outer Critics Circle Award" for "Outstanding Orchestrations." Carter and his co-orchestrator Charlie Rosen are the first orchestrators to win the Outer Critics Circle Award, The Drama Desk Award, and The Tony Award in a single season.

In 2025, Carter served in seven creative roles, including music direction and orchestrations, for George Clooney and Grant Heslov's play Good Night, and Good Luck. It is the highest grossing play in Broadway history, and is the first play to surpass a gross of $4 million in a single week. Carter also continued in these creative roles, including co-music supervision alongside Daniel Kluger (composer), for a live CNN broadcast on June 7, 2025, making it the first live televised performance of a Broadway show.

=== Film/Television ===
Bryan Carter served as the house drummer for NBC’s summer variety show “Maya & Marty” starring Maya Rudolph, Martin Short and Keenan Thompson. The show featured special guests in musical segments Jimmy Fallon, Steve Martin and Nick Jonas. In 2021 and 2022 Bryan Carter worked on “The Not-Too-Late Show with Elmo” and “Sesame Street”.

Carter has appeared as the guest drummer on NBC's "Late Night with Seth Meyers".

=== Awards and nominations ===
Year	Award	Category	Nominated work	Result	Ref.
2023	Outer Critics Circle Award	Outstanding Orchestrations	Some Like It Hot	Won	
2023	Drama Desk Award	Outstanding Orchestrations	Some Like It Hot	Won	
2023	Tony Award	Best Orchestrations	Some Like It Hot	Won	
2024	Grammy Award	Best Musical Theatre Album	Some Like It Hot	Won	
2026	Grammy Award	Grammy Award for Best Arrangement, Instrumental or A Cappella	Super Mario Praise Break	Won	
2026	Drama Desk Award	Outstanding Orchestrations	The Fear of 13	Nominated	

== Personal life ==
Carter resides in the Hells Kitchen neighborhood of New York City. He identifies as queer.

== Jazz at Pride ==
In 2019, Bryan established “Jazz at Pride”—a non-profit organization dedicated to celebrating and creating safe spaces for the LGBTQIA+ community within the jazz community.

== Endorsements ==
Carter endorses Vic Firth drumsticks, mallets and brushes, Zildjian cymbals, Remo drumheads and Ludwig Drums.
