= Benny Benack III =

American jazz trumpeter (born 1990)

Benny Benack
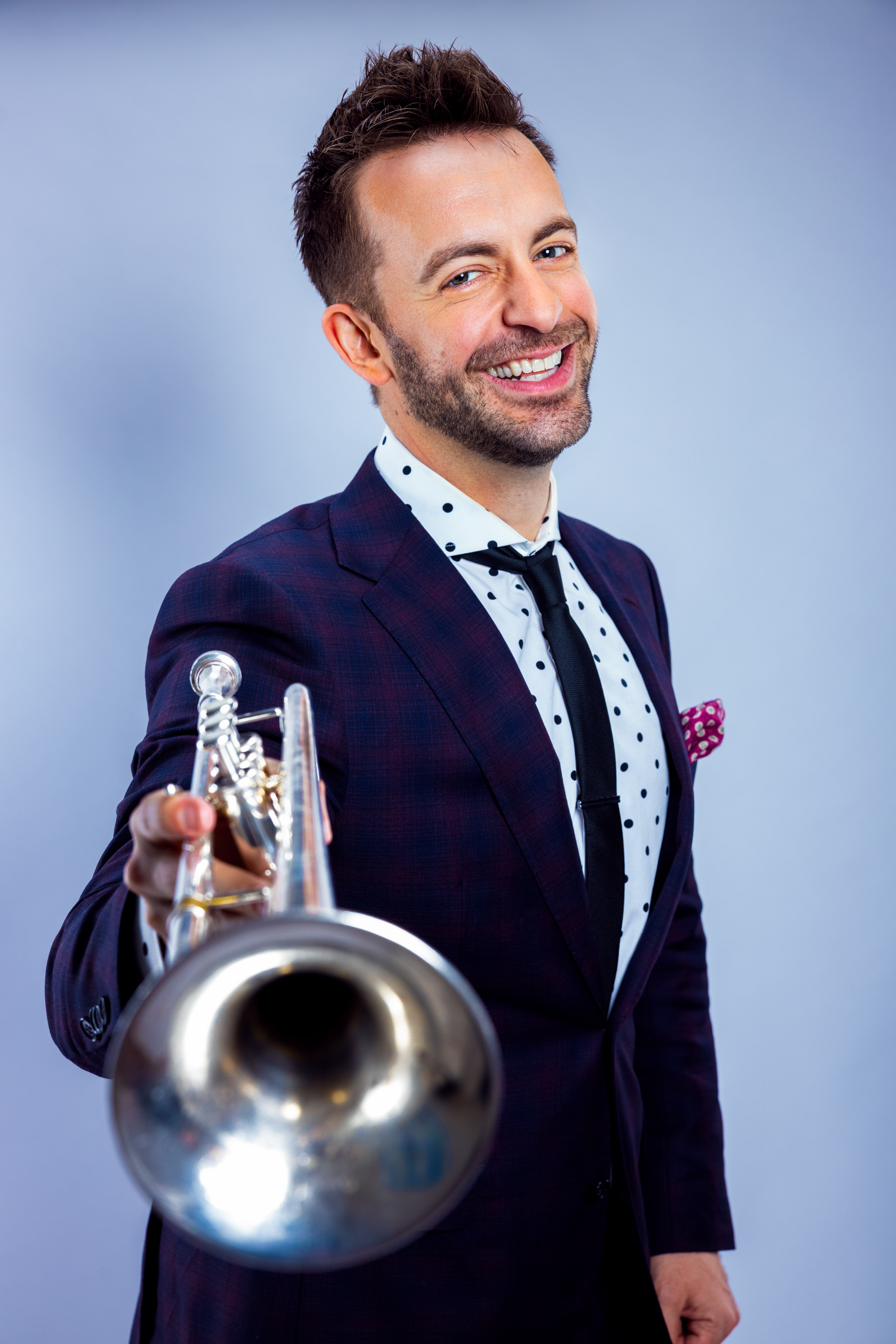
- Benack in 2022

Background information
- Born: November 23, 1990 (age 35); Pittsburgh, Pennsylvania, U.S.
- Genre: Jazz
- Instruments: Trumpet

Ben Edward Benack III, also known as Benny Benack III, (born November 23, 1990) is an American jazz trumpeter, vocalist and composer.

== Early life and education ==
Benny Benack III was born in Pittsburgh, Pennsylvania. He was introduced to the trumpet by his parents at the age of nine after studying piano initially from age five. Benack was raised in the township of Upper St. Clair, Pennsylvania and attended Upper St. Clair High School. While in high school he was a part of The Gibson/Baldwin Grammy Jazz Ensemble where he met future collaborators Emmet Cohen, Bryan Carter, Grace Kelly and Chad Lefkowitz-Brown.

Benack attended The Manhattan School of Music in New York City on a full-tuition scholarship, receiving a Bachelor of Music in 2013 and Master of Music in 2015.

== Career ==
Benny Benack III is primarily known for his work in jazz and cabaret. He has performed with jazz artists Ulysses Owens Jr., Christian McBride, Ann Hampton-Calloway and Joey DeFrancesco. Outside of jazz he has performed with Josh Groban, Diplo, Major Lazer, Ben Folds and Isaac Mizrahi.

Benack has appeared as a featured soloist and performer with Post Modern Jukebox. He is regularly featured with Charlie Rosen & The 8-Bit Big Band.

He was voted the #2 Male Jazz Vocalist "Rising Star" in the August 2023 issue of "Downbeat Magazine". He also appeared in the Trumpet 'Rising Star' category in the same issue of DownBeat Magazine.” He has a weekly residency hosting the Jam Session at Smalls Jazz Club in NYC when he isn't on tour, and has made frequent appearances on Emmet Cohen's "Emmet's Place" livestream, which gained significant popularity during the Covid-19 pandemic in 2020.

He released his third studio album, "Third Time's the Charm" in June 2023, which debuted at #33 on the Jazz Week radio charts the subsequent month. The album features notable Jazz stars such as Peter Bernstein, Emmet Cohen, Bria Skonberg, Chad LB and more.

== Film and television ==
Benack played on The Late Show with Stephen Colbert in the Late Show House Band for a handful of episodes in November 2022. Benack was also the house-trumpet player for NBC's summer variety show, Maya & Marty starring Maya Rudolph, Martin Short and Keenan Thompson. The show featured special guests in musical segments Jimmy Fallon, Steve Martin and Nick Jonas. He performed vocals for a musical segment in the finale of season 2 of Helluva Boss.

== Family ==
Benny is the grandson of musician Benny Benack, who is perhaps best known for writing the Pittsburgh Pirates and Steelers theme, "Beat 'Em Bucs." His father is musician Benny "Peek" Benack II. His mother Claudia Benack is a professor of music theater at Carnegie Mellon University. His sister Laura resides in Los Angeles, CA and co-leads a band "Bass Race" with her husband in which they both sing, play instruments and produce original songs.
