= Emmet Cohen =

American jazz pianist (born 1990)

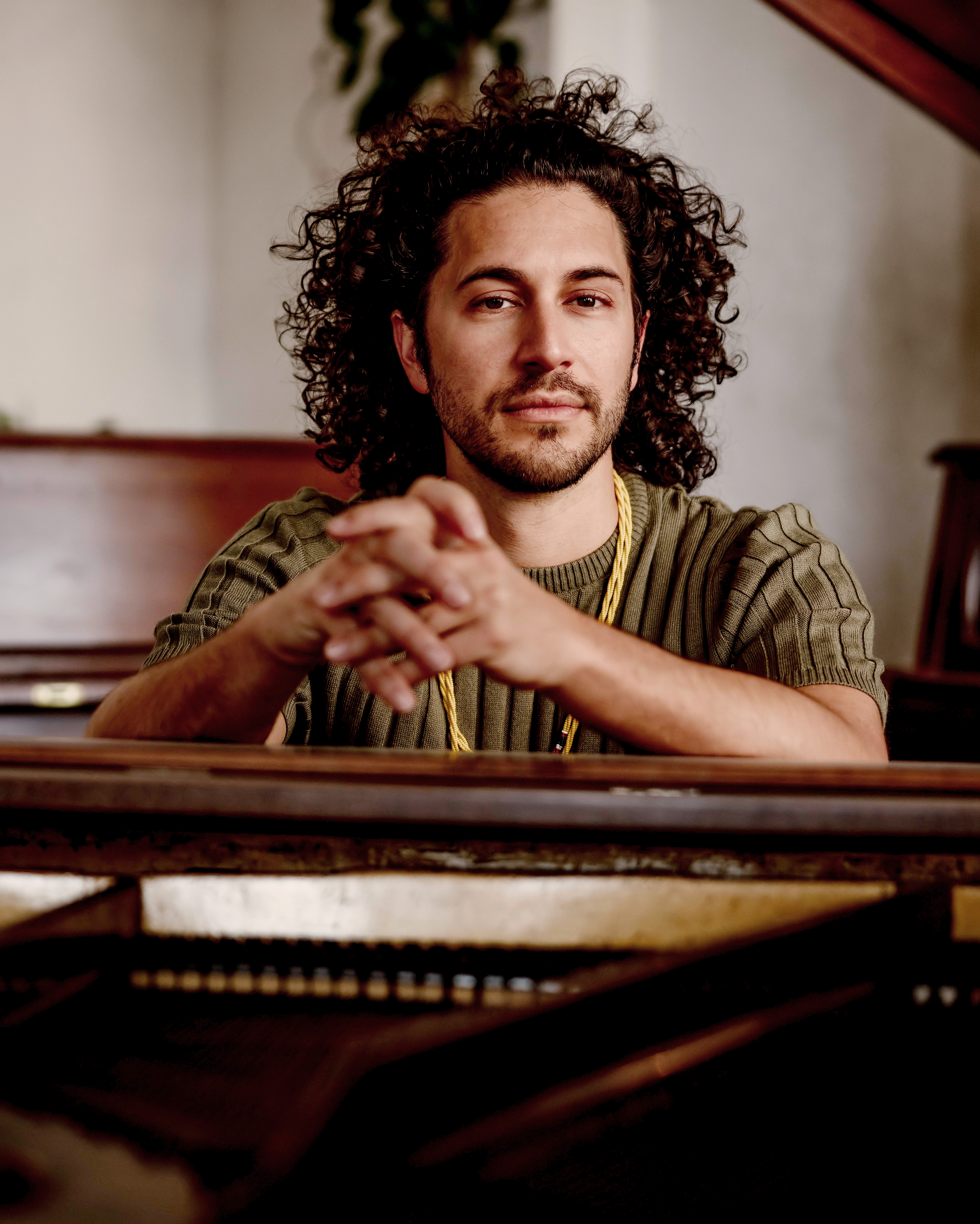
- Cohen in 2022

Background information
- Born: Emmet Harley Cohen; May 25, 1990 (age 36); Miami, Florida, U.S.
- Origin: New York City, U.S.
- Genres: Jazz; straight-ahead jazz; bebop; stride piano
- Occupations: Musician; composer; educator
- Instruments: Piano; Hammond B-3 organ
- Years active: 2010–present
- Label: Mack Avenue
- Member of: Emmet Cohen Trio
- Website: www.emmetcohen.com

Emmet Harley Cohen (born May 25, 1990) is an American jazz pianist, composer, arranger, bandleader and educator.

== Early life and education ==
Emmet Cohen was born in Miami, Florida, United States. He began studying piano at the age of three using the Suzuki method. He was raised in Montclair, New Jersey, and attended Montclair High School. While in high school, he was a part of The Gibson/Baldwin Grammy Jazz Ensemble, where he met future collaborators Bryan Carter, Benny Benack III, Grace Kelly, and Chad Lefkowitz-Brown. Cohen received a Bachelor of Music from the Frost School of Music at the University of Miami in 2012 and a Master of Music from the Manhattan School of Music in 2014.

According to Cohen, listening to and learning from other jazz artists has been a hallmark of his development from a young age. He frequented jazz clubs on his own and with his father, often talking with the artists or sitting in on sessions. Cohen learned to play the Hammond B-3 organ at Cecil's Jazz Club in West Orange, run by Cecil Brooks III, where he regularly played the B-3 during sessions led by saxophonist Bruce Williams.

== Career ==
Cohen is primarily known for his work in jazz, although he has also studied European art music (classical music) extensively, an influence apparent in his technique, occasional improvisational "quotes", and technical mastery of the keyboard as well as producing ragtime music, Tin Pan Alley, and swing. He has performed with Christian McBride, Herlin Riley, Brian Lynch, Ron Carter, Jimmy Cobb, Albert "Tootie" Heath, Joe Lovano, Eddie Henderson, and George Coleman, among others. As a bandleader, Cohen tours with his band, the Emmet Cohen Trio, with various collaborators, including Russell Hall, Kyle Poole, Phillip Norris, and Joe Farnsworth.

In 2010, while a student at the Frost School of Music, Cohen recorded and self-released his debut album, In the Element. In 2011, during his senior year, he won the Kathleen T. and Philip B. Phillips, M.D., Jazz Piano Competition, a nationally recognized jazz performance competition for undergraduate and graduate students at colleges and universities throughout the United States sponsored by the University of West Florida.

In 2011, after placing third in the Thelonious Monk International Piano Competition, held annually at the Kennedy Center's Eisenhower Theater in Washington, D.C., Cohen and the two other finalists were invited to a meet and greet at the Oval Office on September 13, 2011, with President Barack Obama.

After graduating from the University of Miami in 2012, Cohen returned to New York and completed a Master of Music in 2014 at the Manhattan School of Music, which he attended on a full-ride merit scholarship. While there, he released his second and third albums, Infinity (2013), recorded in Italy, and Questioned Answered (2014). In JazzTimes, Brian Lynch wrote, "Lots of young pianists have chops and energy, but Cohen also has an instinct for meaningful aesthetic form. His spilling runs and chiming resolutions are necessary to an overall design."

Since becoming a professional musician, Cohen has become a "high-in-demand jazz pianist and recording artist". He performs at jazz clubs, jazz festivals, jazz cruises, and music venues throughout the U.S. and in more than a dozen countries, including the SF Jazz Festival, Monterey Jazz Festival, Newport Jazz Festival, North Sea Jazz Festival (Netherlands), and Bern Jazz Festival (Switzerland). His live venues have included the Village Vanguard, the Blue Note, Dizzy's Club Coca-Cola, Birdland, Jazz Standard, and Lincoln Center's Rose Hall in New York City; the Kennedy Center in Washington, D.C.; Ronnie Scott's in London; Jazzhaus Montmartre in Copenhagen; the Cotton Club in Tokyo; and the Jazz cruise, the Blue Note at Sea cruise, and the Botti at Sea cruise. For many years he was Hammond B-3 organist-in-residence, hosting a weekly late-night session at the Smoke Jazz & Supper Club in New York City.

In 2019, Cohen received first place in the American Piano Awards, earning him the Cole Porter Fellowship, which included a $50,000 grant, a recording contract with Mack Avenue Records, and a two-year residency at the University of Indianapolis.

In October 2020, during the COVID-19 pandemic, Cohen "managed to revive a European tour originally scheduled for May and string together a dozen dates over 16 days, visiting Italy, Germany, Switzerland and Austria." According to Cohen, he set out to provide "something that the world is lacking—not only jazz, but joy."

In 2021, Cohen released his first album on Mack Avenue, Future Stride, to strong reviews. According to The Guardian, the title "refers to a piano style that evolved in 1920s Harlem, and the piece features bursts of stride barging into passages of later styles." Cohen often discusses his passion for honoring jazz masters, and in a 2021 interview, he related the influence of jazz history on his work, and the naming of Future Stride in honor of learning from jazz masters.

In 2022, Mack Avenue released Cohen's Uptown in Orbit to favorable reviews. One critic wrote, "Cohen consistently has a way of playing old-school music in new inventive ways. He's at the vibrant intersection of the old and new all at once. Unequivocally, his trio is one of the best out there in a crowded field of piano trios. Jones and Bartley fit right in with this energetic group."

In 2024, Mack Avenue released Cohen's third album, Vibe Provider, which is dedicated to his deceased friend Funmi Ononaiye. It features Phillip Norris on bass, either Kyle Poole or Joe Farnsworth on drums, Bruce Harris on trumpet, Tivon Pennicott on tenor saxophone, Frank Lacy on trombone, and Cecily Petrarca on koshkah.

== Live from Emmet's Place ==
Live from Emmet's Place was a weekly video-streaming broadcast and concert Cohen produced on which he and his trio performed with various guests in his fifth-floor walk-up apartment in Harlem. Guests on Live from Emmet’s Place represented a multi-generational cross-section of jazz, from masters such as Houston Person, Joe Lovano, Brad Mehldau, Christian McBride, Eddie Henderson, Steve Davis, Sheila Jordan, and Victor Lewis to newcomers such as tenor saxophonist Nicole Glover and vocalist Samara Joy. It began during the COVID-19 pandemic, and viewership grew from a few hundred to over 1,000 in real time on Facebook and YouTube, with total video views for “Emmet Cohen (weekly)" growing from 1.6 million in January 2021 to 11.4 million in April 2022.

The weekly livestreams have been called "noteworthy for employing sophisticated production values that set the standard for live internet jazz performance". Downbeat wrote, "On the webcasts, the trio swings deeply, often delivering hairpin turns, starts and stops that might lead one to think they are playing well-rehearsed charts. But, in reality, as Poole explained, the musicians' seeming telepathy is a result of living and working together for five years—and, more recently, quarantining together." Chris Robinson wrote, "Perhaps no other album or live performance I've recently experienced has hit this sweet spot of fun balanced with serious artistry more than pianist Emmet Cohen's YouTube series Live from Emmet’s Place [...] Cohen, Hall, and Poole's chemistry and the joy they share in making music is simply infectious."

Cohen said, "One of our main goals is to invite people into the music who may not have known they liked jazz. We like to make it fun and accessible, but also finding ways to challenge the listener as well. We love to provide a link back to the American masters."

[34]

In December 2021, Cohen initiated Emmet’s Place Education, a series of free online master classes with various jazz artists. He has said that one of his greatest passions is teaching, putting new concepts in front of students, and working with them at their level. He also visits schools, gives lessons, teaches master classes, hosts performances, conducts clinics, and gives lectures, often in connection with his tour schedule.

On May 3, 2022, the Jazz Journalists Association voted Cohen its "Live-Stream Producer of the Year". The JJA 2022 Jazz Journalism Awards, its 27th annual poll of professional journalist members, received nearly 300 nominations in 12 categories.

Cohens' last live streamed performance at his Harlem apartment was on October 6, 2025 with the announcement to relocate and continue the series to Power Station (recording studio). They held their first inaugural performance at the studio on December 8th, 2025 featuring Joshua Redman.

== Master Legacy Series ==
Since 2016, Cohen has produced a series of albums, live interviews, and performances as part of the Master Legacy Series, featuring recognized jazz masters. He played on the five albums released as of 2021, featuring collaborations with Houston Person, Jimmy Cobb, Ron Carter, Benny Golson, Albert "Tootie" Heath, and George Coleman.

According to Cohen, the series aims to "share the unwritten folklore that is America's unique artistic idiom." He said his impetus for the project was a five-hour bus ride in 2013 talking with jazz musician Jimmy Heath who told stories about many older jazz masters:

I felt like there was an urgency and there was a big generation gap. […] I wanted to create an artistic project that would allow for the collaboration between the oldest generation and the youngest generation, and really hone in [sic] on what that apprenticeship is and should be—with the intergenerational transference of knowledge and passing of the torch. [...] what it feels like and how we can contribute to the history and the idiom.

Cohen frequently expresses gratitude to and admiration of older musicians:

They are all very emphatic about the music, and how it's guided their lives, and how it's guided the shape of America. That's another thing—they've lived through the 1950s and the 1960s, and toured in the South in the time of segregation, and were really inventing America's music in a place where America didn't accept them. And that story to me is really, really powerful because they gave so much to people… the culture and the society and environment of what it means to be an American.

In November 2023, Cohen released Master Legacy Series Volume 5 with tenor saxophonist Houston Person. The album reflects the long history of collaboration between the two and Cohen's respect for Person as a melodist and poet. Described as "inter-generational sessions where jazz knowledge, tradition, and history are handed down eagerly and generously", the album reached No. 1 for four consecutive weeks and fifth overall on the JazzWeek Jazz Charts after its release.

== Recognition ==
- 2009: Young Arts award (jazz) from the National YoungArts Foundation
- 2011: First Place, Kathleen T. and Phillip B. Phillip's Piano Competition, a nationally recognized jazz performance competition for undergraduate and graduate students throughout the United States
- 2011: Finalist for the American Piano Awards Cole Porter Fellowship
- 2011: Third-place prize in the Thelonious Monk Institute of Jazz International Piano Competition, held annually at the Kennedy Center in Washington, D.C. (now the Herbie Hancock Institute of Jazz)
- 2014: First place in the American Jazz Pianist Competition
- 2015: Finalist in the American Pianists Awards
- 2019: First place in the American Pianists Awards; receiving the Cole Porter Jazz Fellowship valued at over $100,000 (a cash prize, career consultation and concert booking, and a contract with Mack Avenue Records)
- 2019: Named UIndy Artist-in-Residence at the University of Indianapolis
- 2021: Featured in Jazziz magazine Editors' Choice playlist for the week of February 1 – Future Stride
- 2021: Recognized in JazzWeek's Year End Jazz Chart: 2021 – Future Stride, most played album on the radio
- 2021: Selected by the Jazz Journalists Association (JJA) as Up and Coming Musician of the Year
- 2021: Lied Center of Kansas 2021–22 IMPACT Award for distinguished service to the performing arts
- 2022: Featured in 2021 JazzTimes Readers’ Poll: Artist of the Year – 4th Place, Acoustic Small Group/Artist; Tied for 3rd Place, Pianist; Tied for 2nd Place
- 2022: DownBeat 70th Annual Critics Poll – #1 Rising Star Pianist and #4 Rising Star Jazz Artist
- 2022: DownBeat 87th Annual Readers Poll – #3 Pianist
- 2023: Honored by the Jazz Journalists Association with two awards: Pianist of the Year and Live-Stream Producer of the Year
- 2023: DownBeat 71st Annual Critics Poll – #5 Rising Star Pianist and #2 Rising Star Jazz Group (Emmet Cohen Trio)
- 2023: DownBeat 88th Annual Readers Poll – #4 Group (Emmet Cohen Trio) and #4 Piano
- 2024: DownBeat 72nd Annual Critics Poll – #10 Pianist, #3 Rising Star Jazz Artist, #1 Rising Star Jazz Group (Emmet Cohen Trio)

== Discography ==
=== As leader ===
- In the Element (self-released, 2011) – with Greg Gisbert, Joe Sanders, and Rodney Green
- Infinity (Skidoo Records, 2013) – with Giuseppe Venezia and Elio Coppola
- Questioned Answer (Hollistic MusicWorks, 2014) – with Brian Lynch, Boris Kozlov, and Billy Hart
- Masters Legacy Series Volume 1: Jimmy Cobb (Cellar Live, 2017) – with Godwin Louis, Yasushi Nakamura, and Jimmy Cobb
- Masters Legacy Series Volume 2: Ron Carter (Cellar Live, 2018) – with Ron Carter and Evan Sherman
- Emmet Cohen Trio Dirty in Detroit (self-released, 2018) – with Russell Hall and Kyle Poole
- Masters Legacy Series Volume 3: Benny Golson & Albert "Tootie" Heath (self-released, 2019) – with Benny Golson, Russell Hall, Corcoran Holt, and Albert "Tootie" Heath
- Masters Legacy Series Volume 4: George Coleman (self-released, 2019) – with George Coleman, Russell Hall, and Bryan Carter
- Future Stride (Mack Avenue, 2021) – with Russell Hall and Kyle Poole
- Uptown in Orbit (Mack Avenue, 2022) – with Patrick Bartley, Sean Jones, Russell Hall, and Kyle Poole
- Masters Legacy Series Volume 5: Houston Person (Bandstand, 2023) – with Houston Person, Yasushi Nakamura, and Kyle Poole
- Vibe Provider (Mack Avenue, 2024) – with Tivon Pennicott, Bruce Harris, Frank Lacy, Philip Norris, Kyle Poole, and Joe Farnsworth
- Universal Truth (Mack Avenue, 2026) – with Jeremy Pelt, George Coleman, Tivon Pennicott, Yasushi Nakamura, Ron Carter, and Joe Farnsworth

=== As sideman ===
With Herlin Riley

- New Direction (Mack Avenue, 2016)
- Perpetual Optimism (Mack Avenue, 2019)

With Benny Benack III

- One of Kind (BB3 productions, 2017)
- Third Time's The Charm (La Reserve, 2023)

With Veronica Swift

- Confessions (Mack Avenue, 2019)
- This Bitter Earth (Mack Avenue, 2021)

With others

- Troy Roberts, Days Like These (Toy Robot Music, 2019)
- Ashley Pezzotti, We've Only Just Begun (self-released, 2019)
- Jean John, A Love Lane Nocturne (Zan Tetickovic, 2019)
- Anaïs Reno, Lovesome Thing (Harbinger, 2021)
- The Four Freshmen, The Four Freshmen: Featuring Emmet Cohen, Russell Hall, And Kyle Poole (CD Baby, 2022)
- Alex Weitz, Rule of Thirds (Outside in Music, 2023)

== Critical reception ==
Cohen's recordings and live performances have received numerous reviews and accolades in the press and on jazz community blogs. Often noted are his innovative interpretations of jazz standards, skill as a composer, energetic style, and precise technical skills. Giovanni Russonello of The New York Times mentioned his "breezy, phlegmatic command at the keyboard, and a deep well of historical jazz references at his fingertips". Jeff Tamarkin of JazzTimes wrote, "Cohen's skill on his instrument is matched by his inventiveness. His mastery of mainstream-jazz language and his wide-ranging technical facility are pronounced."

Dave Gelly of The Guardian wrote that Future Stride "has the rare and elusive quality of charm" and that, although serious, it includes "little eccentricities and the occasional wink". For Jazziz magazine, Suzanne Lorge wrote, "his originals brim with spontaneity and stylistic allusions without devolving into disarray or languishing in clichés; that he can interpolate so many fleeting musical notions into one mutating composition is astonishing."
