= Alex Goodman =

Canadian jazz guitarist (born 1987)

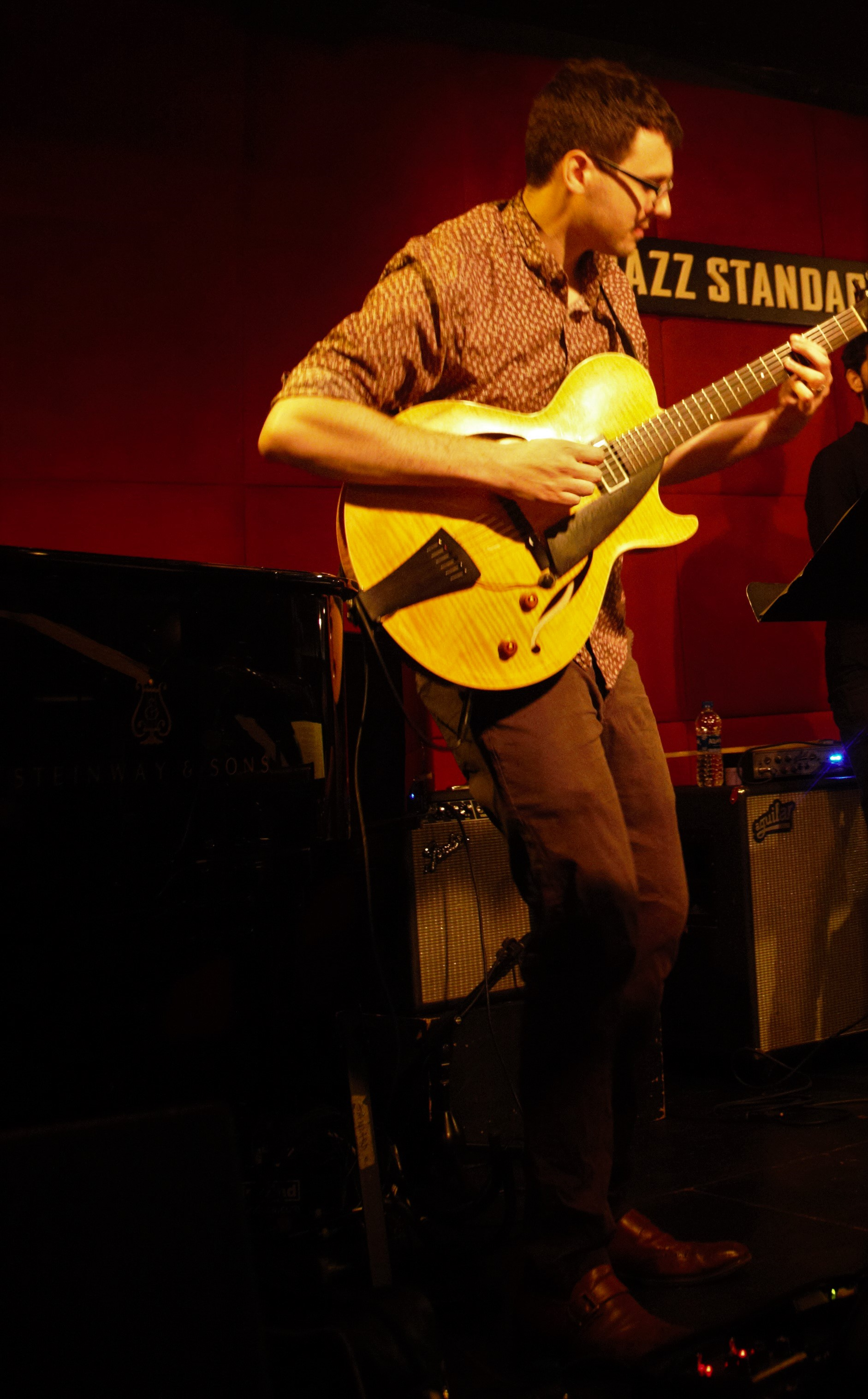
- Goodman performing at the Jazz Standard in New York City

Background information
- Born: December 22, 1987 (age 38)
- Origin: Toronto, Canada
- Genres: Jazz
- Occupations: Guitarist, composer, academic teacher
- Instrument: Guitar
- Website: www.alexgoodmanmusic.com

Alex Goodman is a Canadian jazz guitarist.

== Biography ==
A native of Toronto, Canada, Goodman initially attended McGill University as a political science major. He later opted to return to Toronto to study jazz performance and composition at the University of Toronto before relocating to New York City to complete a Master's degree at Manhattan School of Music.

In 2013, Goodman received a nomination for Canada's Juno Award for Contemporary Jazz Album of the Year. The album, Bridges, featured original music by Goodman as well as arrangements of compositions by Béla Bartók and Frédéric Chopin. He also received the 2013 ASCAP Herb Alpert Jazz Composer Award.

In July 2014, Goodman became the first Canadian to win both first prize and the Public's Choice Award at the prestigious SOCAR Montreux International Jazz Guitar Competition.

He has worked with artists including John Patitucci, Bob Mintzer, Manuel Valera, Ari Hoenig, Tim Ries, Dick Oatts, John Riley, Jimmy Macbride, Rich Perry, Dave Douglas, Dan Tepfer and others.

He has released many albums, including Trio, After All (2026), Good Morning Heartache (2025), "Library" (2025), Impressions in Blue and Red (2020), Second Act (2017), Border Crossing (2016), Etudes for Solo Guitar (2014), Bridges (2011), Convergence (2009) and Roots (2007).

Since 2024, he has acted as Professor of Jazz Guitar at Kunst Universitat Graz Jazz Institut

== Discography ==
=== As leader ===
- Trio, After All (Outside In, 2026)
- Good Morning Heartache (Outside In, 2025)
- Library (with Martina DaSilva, La Reserve, 2025)
- Impressions in Blue and Red (Outside In, 2020)
- Second Act (Lyte, 2017)
- Border Crossing (Origin, 2016)
- Etudes for Solo Guitar (Independent, 2014)
- Bridges (Connection Point, 2011)
- Convergence (with Brent Mah, Independent, 2009)
- Roots (Independent, 2007)

=== As sideman ===
With Manuel Valera

- 2022 Distancia
- 2020 José Martí en Nueva York

With Lucas Pino

- 2023 Covers

With Jihye Lee

- 2024 Infinite Connections

With Mareike Wiening

- 2023 Reveal
- 2022 Future Memories
- 2021 Live at Bird's Eye
- 2019 Metropolis Paradise
- 2015 Crosswalk

With Remy Le Boeuf

- 2024 Heartland Radio
- 2021 Architecture of Storms
- 2019 Assembly of Shadows

With Amanda Tosoff

- 2021 Earth Voices
- 2016 Words

With Martina DaSilva

- 2024 Living Room Petit
- 2023 Living Room Christmas
- 2022 Living Room 3

With Cy Leo

- 2023 Free Dimension

With Jesse Simpson

- 2022 Bar Bayeux Beginnings

With Ernesto Cervini

- 2021 Tetrahedron Live at the Jazz Room

With Leo Sherman

- 2019 Tonewheel

With Andrew Van Tassel

- 2021 Shapeshifter

With Allegra Levy

- 2018 Looking at the Moon

With Tomoko Omura

- 2017 Post Bop Gypsies

With Chad Lefkowitz Brown

- 2020 Quarantine Sessions

With Matthew Sheens

- 2016 Cloud Appreciation Day

With Garry Dial & Dick Oatts

- 2014 That Music Always Round Me

With San Fermin

- 2014 San Fermin
