= 7835 Myroncope =

Main-belt asteroid

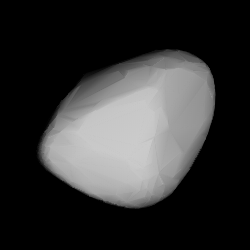
- Shape model of Myroncope from its lightcurve

Discovery
- Discovered by: T. B. Spahr
- Discovery site: Catalina Stn.
- Discovery date: 16 June 1993

Designations
- Named after: Myron Cope (American sports announcer)
- Alternative designations: 1993 MC · 1990 WV_{12}
- Minor planet category: main-belt · (middle); Mitidika

Orbital characteristics
- Epoch 4 September 2017 (JD 2458000.5)
- Uncertainty parameter 0
- Observation arc: 26.35 yr (9,623 days)
- Aphelion: 3.1508 AU
- Perihelion: 1.9528 AU
- Semi-major axis: 2.5518 AU
- Eccentricity: 0.2347
- Orbital period (sidereal): 4.08 yr (1,489 days)
- Mean anomaly: 351.55°
- Mean motion: 0° 14^{m} 30.48^{s} / day
- Inclination: 12.964°
- Longitude of ascending node: 220.40°
- Argument of perihelion: 37.179°

Physical characteristics
- Mean diameter: 6.21 km (calculated); 10.752±0.061 km
- Synodic rotation period: 7.43019±0.00001 h
- Pole ecliptic latitude: (72.0°, −64.0°) (λ_{1}/β_{1}); (288.0°, −55.0°) (λ_{2}/β_{2})
- Geometric albedo: 0.085±0.018; 0.20 (assumed)
- Spectral type: S (assumed)
- Absolute magnitude (H): 13.3 · 13.4

7835 Myroncope (prov. designation: 1993 MC) is an asteroid of the Mitidika family from the central region of the asteroid belt. It was discovered on 16 June 1993, by American astronomer Timothy Spahr at the Catalina Station in Arizona, United States. The assumed S-type asteroid has a rotation period of 7.4 hours and measures approximately 10 kilometers (6 miles) in diameter. It was named in memory of American sports announcer Myron Cope (1929–2008).

== Classification and orbit ==
Myroncope has been identified as a member of the Mitidika family, a dispersed asteroid family of typically carbonaceous C-type asteroids. The family is named after 2262 Mitidika (diameter of 9 km) and consists of 653 known members, the largest ones being 404 Arsinoë (95 km) and 5079 Brubeck (17 km).

The asteroid orbits the Sun in the central main-belt at a distance of 2.0–3.2 AU once every 4 years and 1 month (1,489 days). Its orbit has an eccentricity of 0.23 and an inclination of 13° with respect to the ecliptic. The first identification of this asteroid was made at the Japanese Geisei Observatory in 1990. However the observation was excluded from the asteroid's orbit determination and did not extend its observation arc prior to its discovery.

== Naming ==
This minor planet was named in memory of famed sports announcer and journalist Myron Cope (1929–2008). He was a color commentator for the Pittsburgh Steelers National Football League team for 35 years and was the creator of the Terrible Towel in 1975. The naming citation was published by the Minor Planet Center on 20 May 2008 (M.P.C. 62928).

== Physical characteristics ==
=== Diameter and albedo ===
According to the survey carried out by the NEOWISE mission of NASA's Wide-field Infrared Survey Explorer, Myroncope measures 10.8 kilometers in diameter and its surface has an albedo of 0.08. The Collaborative Asteroid Lightcurve Link assumes a standard albedo for stony asteroids of 0.20 and calculates a smaller diameter of 6.2 kilometers based on an absolute magnitude of 13.4.

=== Rotation period and poles ===
In 2016, the asteroid's lightcurve has been modeled using data from Lowell photometric database, which gave a sidereal rotation period of 7.43019 hours, as well as two spin axes of (72.0°, −64.0°) and (288.0°, −55.0°) in ecliptic coordinates (λ, β) (Q=n.a.).
