= Alma Macbride =

- Born: April 21, 1995 (age 31)
- Origin: Hartford, Connecticut, U.S.
- Genres: Jazz
- Occupation: filmmaker
- Instrument: Piano
- Website: almamacbride.com

Alma Macbride (born April 21, 1995) is an American filmmaker and artist based in New York City. They are the daughter of classical pianist David Macbride and painter Lisa Macbride, and the younger sister of jazz drummer and composer Jimmy Macbride.

== Biography ==
Macbride graduated from Harvard University, where they studied film production with Robb Moss and Guy Maddin. They also have a wide musical background, and was taught piano from the age of 4. They picked up jazz piano at the age of 8, and have composed music thereafter, for which they have won an ASCAP Award and full scholarships to Grammy Camp and the Skidmore Jazz Institute. They have performed with a series of musicians like Jimmy Greene, Wynton Marsalis, and the Jazz at Lincoln Center Orchestra.

== Honors ==
- 2012: Recipient of the ASCAP Young Jazz Composers Award for the composition Full House
