= Pittsburgh Steelerettes =

Cheerleading squad in the US

- Established: 1961; 65 years ago
- Defunct: 1969; 57 years ago
- Affiliations: Pittsburgh Steelers
- Website: steelerettes.com
- Formerly called: Pittsburgh Steelerettes (1961-1969)

The Pittsburgh Steelerettes were the first cheerleading squad in the National Football League, serving as the cheerleaders for the Pittsburgh Steelers during the 1960s. The squad eventually disbanded, and the Steelers to this day are among the few NFL teams that do not have cheerleaders.

From their beginning in 1961 until the squad's demise in 1969, all members of the Steelerettes were full-time students at Robert Morris Junior College in Pittsburgh, Pennsylvania. Robert Morris was a small junior college without a football team that had unofficially adopted the Steelers as "their team". An administrator at the college, William Day, also served as the entertainment coordinator for the Steelers. It was his idea to hold tryouts at the college and select a group of young female students to perform on the field, in hopes of improving lackluster ticket sales to Steelers games.

At tryouts, candidates were evaluated on coordination, personality, gymnastics, and appearance. Squad members took a basic football test to prove that they would know when to cheer and were required to maintain a 2.0 GPA. At games, they performed choreographed jazz routines to live jazz music, performed by Harold Betters and bandleader Benny Benack. They practiced in the school cafeteria or in front of their dormitory. Steelerettes received one free ticket per game as pay.

During the 1962 season, the Steelerettes were accompanied by a squad of the NFL's first male cheerleaders, also Robert Morris students, known as the Ingots. The men fired a cannon filled with 12-gauge blanks when the Steelers scored, wearing uniforms of black slacks, white or gold shirts, and hard hats. The male group disbanded at the end of one season.

By the late 1960s, Robert Morris' student body had grown, and the school now had its own football team. The decision to disband was a joint decision between the Rooney family and Robert Morris. Apparently, the cheerleaders wished to wear outfits that were more "modern" and "daring". In response, the owner fired the team. The last squad of Steelerettes left the field after the 1969 season, the first year of Hall of Famers head coach Chuck Noll and defensive tackle "Mean Joe" Greene. Nearly 60 women participated in the squad over their eight seasons.

The team has not had another cheerleading squad since the Steelerettes were disbanded.

== See also ==
- Steeler Nation
- Steely McBeam
