= Jimmy Macbride =

American jazz drummer and composer (born 1991)

- Born: May 10, 1991 (age 35)
- Origin: Hartford, Connecticut
- Genre: Jazz
- Occupation: Musician
- Instrument: Drums
- Spouse: Miki Yamanaka
- Website: jimmymacbride.com

Jimmy Macbride (born May 10, 1991) is an American jazz drummer and composer. He is the older brother of jazz pianist, composer and film maker Alma Macbride.

== Biography ==
Raised in West Hartford, Connecticut, Macbride grew up in an artistic family—his father a composer of classical music and his mother a visual artist. He developed an early interest in jazz from listening to his parents' cassettes of Frank Sinatra and began to perform professionally while in the third grade. He later attended Hall High School where he participated in the school's award-winning jazz program and has since been cited among its notable alumni (including pianist Brad Mehldau, saxophonists Joel Frahm and Noah Preminger, and composer Patrick Zimmerli). In 2009, he relocated to New York City to study at the Juilliard School.

He has worked with saxophonists Jimmy Greene, Chad Lefkowitz-Brown, Chase Baird, and Lucas Pino, guitarists Nir Felder and Adam Rogers, pianist David Virelles and others. He has also been a key member of Samora Pinderhughes' Transformation Suite ensemble.

Together with his sister Alma Macbride, Jimmy has given concerts throughout the greater Hartford, Connecticut area at senior citizen homes and other similar venues. The duo donated all proceeds to the Whiting Lane School to aid in the purchase of musical instruments and other equipment.

== Discography ==
=== As sideman ===
Album artist	Title	Year	Label
Luke Sellick	Alchemist	2017	Cellar Live
Alex Wintz	Life Cycle	2017	Culture Shock
Paul Jones	Clean	2017	Outside In Music
Nick Finzer	Hear & Now	2017	Outside In Music
Chris Ziemba	Manhattan Lullabye	2017	Outside In Music
Chad Lefkowitz-Brown	Onward	2017	Independent
Alex Goodman	Second Act	2017	Lyte Records
Roxy Coss	Chasing the Unicorn	2016	Posi-tone Records
Dan Wilkins Ensemble	Jnana-Vijnana (Awake)	2015	Minsi Ridge Records
Steven Feifke	Peace in Time	2015
Nick Finzer	The Chase	2015	Origin Records
Davey Lantz Trio	Ascent	2015	Minsi Ridge Records
Clovis Nicolas	Nine Stories	2014	Sunnyside Records
