= Out Here (Christian McBride album) =

Studio album by Christian McBride
- Released: August 6, 2013
- Recorded: April 1–2, 2012
- Studios: Avatar (New York, New York)
- Genre: Jazz
- Length: 65:00
- Label: Mack Avenue MAC 1069
- Producer: Christian McBride

Christian McBride chronology
People Music (2013)	Out Here (2013)	Live at the Village Vanguard (2015)

Out Here is a studio album by jazz bassist Christian McBride. It was released on August 6, 2013 via Mack Avenue label. This is his twelfth album as a leader.

== Reception ==
Professional ratings
Aggregate scores
Source	Rating
Metacritic	79/100
Review scores
Source	Rating
AllMusic	4/5 stars
The Guardian	4/5 stars
Jazzwise	4/5 stars
Tom Hull	B+

Critical reviews were generally favorable, as the album received a score of 79% on Metacritic. Matt Collar of AllMusic wrote "Christian McBride's second studio album in 2013, Out Here, finds the adept bassist leading his trio through a jaunty, exuberant set of straight-ahead acoustic jazz. The album follows on the heels of his equally as appealing quintet album, People Music. However, where that album found McBride delving into the knotty post-bop sound of artists like '60s Bobby Hutcherson, Out Here is more of a classic standards album in the vein of works by Oscar Peterson and Duke Ellington. Joining McBride here is his working trio of pianist Christian Sands and drummer Ulysses Owens, Jr., who was also featured on People Music. Both Sands and Owens are superb, technically adroit musicians who complement McBride's warm, generous bass playing at every turn on Out Here. What's great about McBride leading his own trio is that because he is fundamentally such a monster of a bassist, he can and does take the lead on any given song just as well, if not better, than many of his non-rhythm section instrument-playing brethren."

Phil Johnson of The Independent stated "Most piano trios in what is now a very crowded market, follow some special programme or USP: getting all trancey, say, or covering tunes by long dead folkies. McBride, who is both the bassist and the boss, doesn't bother, preferring the usual mix of standards and ballads. The result is refreshing but also a bit boring, although things get interesting towards the end with a gooey show-tune ("I Have Dreamed") and a funky "Who's Making Love".

== Track listing ==
No.	Title	Writer(s)	Length
1.	"Ham Hocks and Cabbage"	McBride	8:25
2.	"Hallelujah Time"	Malcolm Dodds, Harriette Hamilton, Oscar Peterson	4:03
3.	"I Guess I'll Have to Forget"	McBride	8:26
4.	"Easy Walker"	Billy Taylor	6:42
5.	"My Favorite Things"	Oscar Hammerstein II, Richard Rodgers	9:19
6.	"East of the Sun (And West of the Moon)"	Brooks Bowman	7:41
7.	"Cherokee"	Ray Noble	5:39
8.	"I Have Dreamed"	Oscar Hammerstein II, Richard Rodgers	8:27
9.	"Who's Making Love"	Homer Banks, Bettye Crutcher, Don Davis, Raymond Jackson	6:18
Total length:			65:00

== Personnel ==
Band

- Christian McBride – bass, producer
- Christian Sands – piano
- Ulysses Owens – drums

Production

- Randall Kennedy – creative director
- André Kimo Stone Guess – associate producer
- Chi Modu – photography
- Raj Naik – art direction, design
- Al Pryor – A&R
- Will Wakefield – production manager
- Mark Wilder – mastering

== Chart performance ==
Chart (2013)	Peak position
US Jazz Albums (Billboard)	11
