= Benny Benack =

American jazz musician

Ben E. "Benny" Benack I (August 31, 1921 – July 23, 1986) was at the forefront of the Pittsburgh jazz scene in the 1960s and 1970s. A talented trumpet player, Benack was made famous by his song "Beat'em Bucs" and was a staple at Pittsburgh Pirates and Pittsburgh Steelers games. The Benny Benack Orchestra played the styles of traditional jazz, dixieland, and swing. He was known as the "King of Dixieland" in Pittsburgh for many years.

== Biography ==
Benack was born to Italian immigrant parents in 1921 and grew up in Clairton, Pennsylvania, a suburb of Pittsburgh. His father, Charlie, was a self-taught photographer who started out walking from one mill town to another in the Monongahela River valley, his equipment on a donkey, making family portraits and class photographs. Uninterested in following in the photography business, young Benny began playing trumpet at age five, and practiced for six or seven hours a day throughout his childhood.

He was educated in the fine arts department of the Carnegie Institute of Technology, now Carnegie Mellon University, where he was friends with jazz composer Sammy Nestico. He also attended the University of Pittsburgh. He played at army bases in Florida and India during World War II, was director of a group of young musicians known as the Dodge Kids, and toured the country with the Tommy Dorsey Orchestra and the Raymond Scott Orchestra. During the late 1950s and '60s, he was an innovative bandleader at Clairton High School, introducing jazz, swing, and high-stepping routines to the marching band's pregame and halftime performances.

Benack died in 1986 of lung cancer.

== Personal life ==
He and his wife Gretchen had three children: Benny "Peek" Benack II, Flip, and Suzie, each of whom had two children of their own. Peek and Flip both live near Pittsburgh with their families, while Suzie moved to upstate New York. Peek continues the family musical tradition as Benny Benack Jr., playing trumpet, clarinet, and saxophone.

Peek's son, Benny Benack III, is following in his grandfather's footsteps as a jazz trumpeter and vocalist, touring the world as an international soloist with such artists as Postmodern Jukebox, Aaron Johnson, Christian McBride, Josh Groban, Isaac Mizrahi, Joey DeFrancesco, and many others. He was featured on the NBC series Maya & Marty as part of the in-house band.

Flip currently owns and operates Benack Sound Productions, an audio/visual production company near Pittsburgh, Pennsylvania.
