= Matthew Whitaker (pianist) =

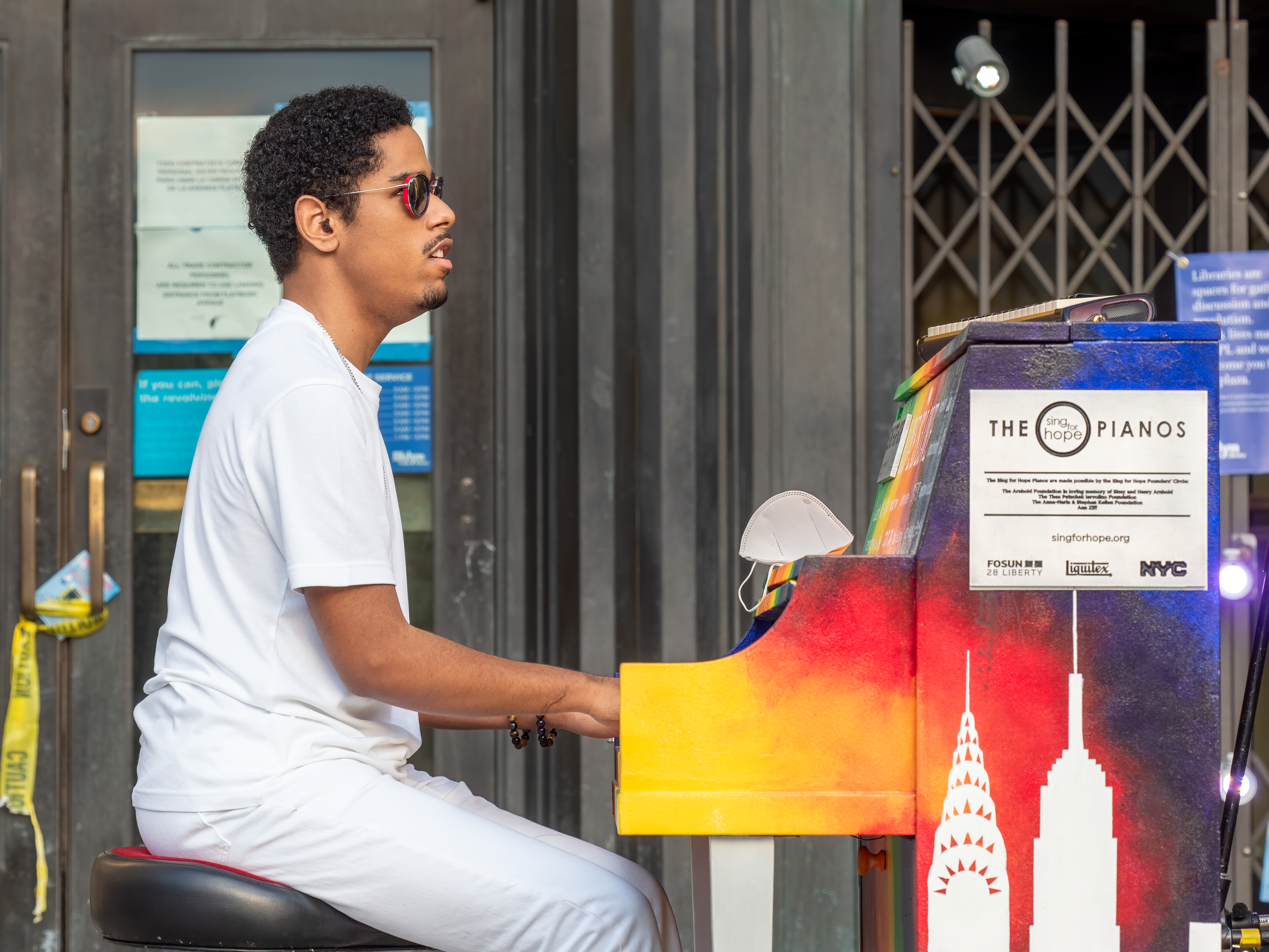
- Whitaker in Brooklyn in June 2020

Background information
- Born: April 3, 2001 (age 25); Hackensack, New Jersey, U.S.
- Genre: Jazz
- Instruments: Piano; Organ
- Website: www.matthewwhitaker.net

Matthew Whitaker (born April 3, 2001) is an American jazz pianist. Blind since birth, he has performed at venues including Carnegie Hall, the Kennedy Center, Lincoln Center and the Apollo Theater, where, at 10, he was the opening performer for Stevie Wonder's induction into the Apollo Theater's Hall of Fame.

Whitaker was the subject of Thrive, a 13-minute documentary about "the prodigious talent and irrepressible spirit of a musically precocious 12-year-old blind boy."

== Early life and education ==
Whitaker was born in Hackensack, New Jersey to May and Moses Whitaker. Born three months prematurely, he weighed less than two pounds, and was given a less than 50 percent chance of survival. He was later diagnosed with retinopathy of prematurity (ROP), which caused his blindness. On his third birthday, he played "Twinkle, Twinkle Little Star" on a toy Yamaha keyboard he had received as a birthday present. Whitaker had heard the song and played it by ear.

Whitaker began taking piano lessons when he was 5 as the youngest student at The Filomen M. D'Agostino Greenberg Music School, a New York school for the blind and visually impaired. With perfect pitch, he learned to play piano mainly by listening, although he learned to read Braille music as well. He later studied at The Harlem School of the Arts, and in addition to taking lessons in classical and jazz piano, he learned to play the organ, percussion instruments, the clarinet and bass guitar. At 9, he earned the support of the Jazz Foundation of America, and as a teenager, he attended the Manhattan School of Music's Pre-College Jazz program. His playing was influenced by Jimmy Smith, Joey DeFrancesco, Art Tatum, Oscar Peterson, Barry Harris, Erroll Garner, and Thelonious Monk.

== Career ==
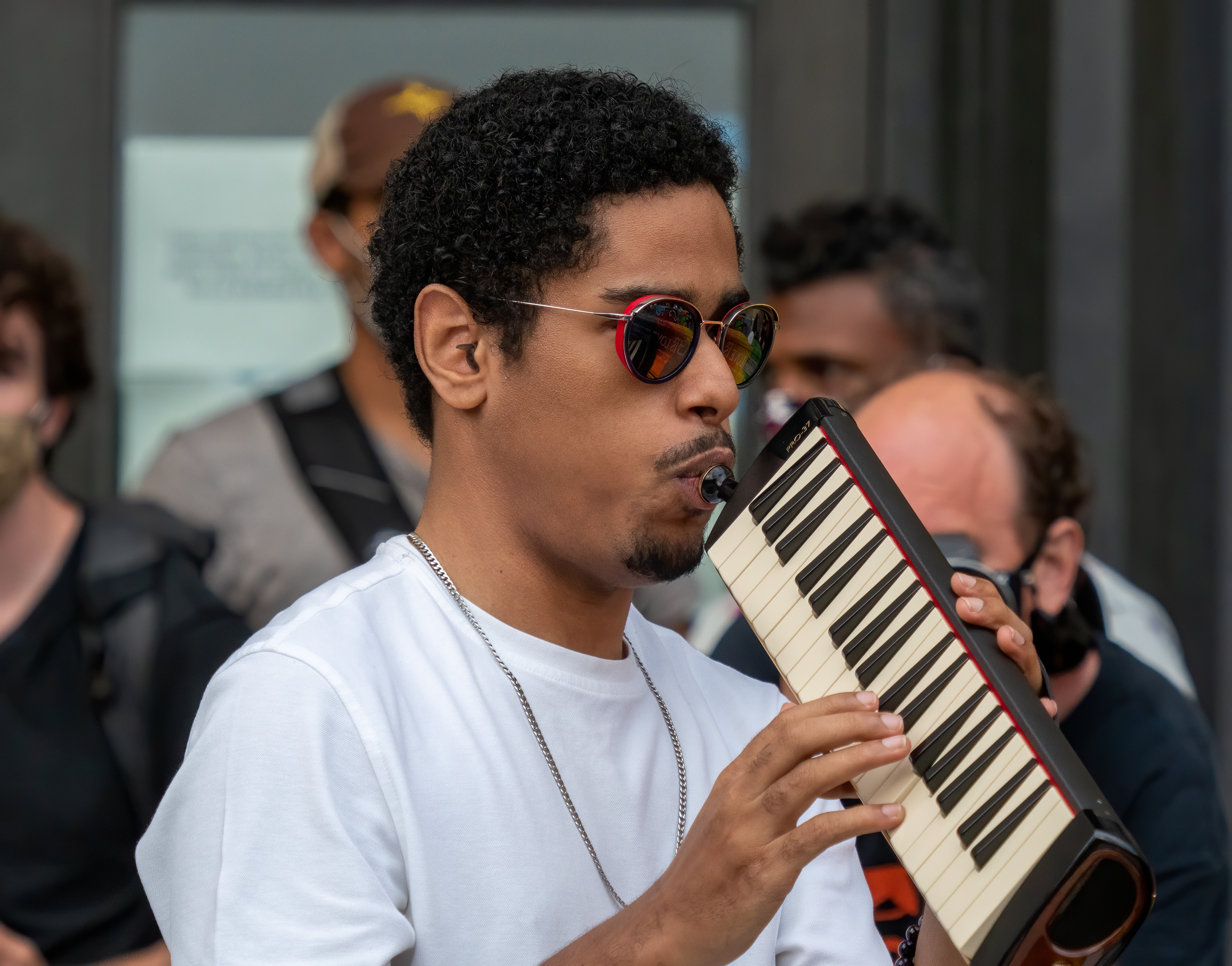
Whitaker playing a melodica in June 2020

On March 6, 2017, he released his first album, Outta the Box. Other musicians on the album include Christian McBride, Dave Stryker, Will Calhoun, Sammy Figueroa, Melissa Walker, and James Carter.

In April 2017, Whitaker performed on the Ellen Degeneres Show and competed on Fox's Showtime at the Apollo, winning first place. Whitaker has toured Europe, the Middle East and Asia. Among other venues, he has performed at the main concert hall at the Kennedy Center in Washington, D.C and the Weill Recital Hall at Carnegie Hall. He was featured on 60 Minutes in December, 2020.

In 2025, Matthew Whitaker was named the inaugural artist-in-residence at the Augustana University School of Music in Sioux Falls, South Dakota. In 2026, he won the Grammy Award for Best Arrangement, Instrumental or A Cappella for "Super Mario Praise Break" alongside Charlie Rosen and Bryan Carter.

== Discography ==
- Outta the Box (2017)
- Now Hear This (2019)
- Connections (2021)
- On Their Shoulders: An Organ Tribute (2024)
