= Quentin Angus =

- Born: Mount Pleasant, South Australia
- Genres: Jazz
- Occupation: Musician
- Instrument: Guitar
- Years active: 2000s–present
- Website: quentinangus.com

Quentin Bryan Angus is an Australian jazz guitarist.

== Career ==
Quentin Bryan Angus is from country South Australia.

He holds a PhD, a Master of Music degree, and a Bachelor of Music Degree from the Elder Conservatorium at the University of Adelaide.

== Career ==
Angus has produced two independently released albums, Retrieval Structure (2011) and Perception (2013).

His quintet has performed at Jazz Hoeilaart in Belgium and Europafest in Romania.

He has written three transcription books of Gilad Hekselman's Improvisations from his albums: Split-Life; Words Unspoken; and 'Hearts Wide Open' were published by Mel Bay, JazzHeaven, the NZMiC music journal. He has also presented research papers on his transcriptions of Hekselman and John Abercrombie at music conferences in New Zealand and Australia.

== Awards and honours ==
Angus received the Helpmann Academy's Keith Michell Award in 2010, The first time a jazz musician had ever won the award.

He was the inaugural winner of the APRA Art Music Award for Excellence In Jazz in 2012.

In 2013, he was awarded the Dame Ruby Litchfield Scholarship for Performing Arts.

He won Downbeat Jazz Awards for Jazz Soloist in 2012 and 2014, and for Jazz Composition in 2011, 2012, and 2014.

He participated in the Betty Carter Jazz Ahead residency at the Kennedy Center, Washington DC in 2011 and 2013.
