= Christian Sands =

American jazz pianist and composer (born 1989)

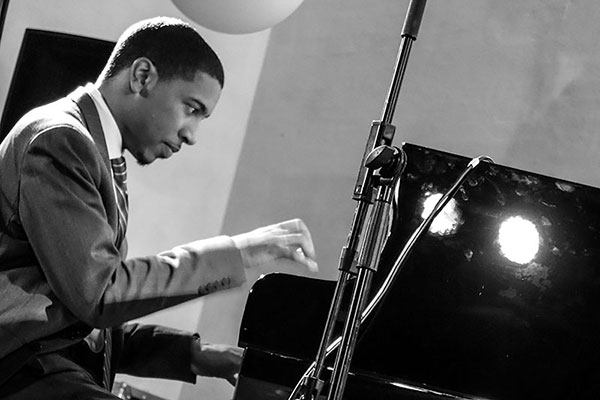
- Sands in Denmark, 2015

Background information
- Born: Christian Sylvester Sands; May 22, 1989 (age 37); New Haven, Connecticut, U.S.
- Genre: Jazz
- Occupations: Musician, composer
- Instrument: Piano
- Years active: 2000s–present
- Label: Mack Avenue
- Website: christiansandsjazz.com

Christian Sylvester Sands (born May 22, 1989) is an American jazz pianist and composer. His third album for Mack Avenue Records, Be Water, was released in 2020 and received a Grammy Award nomination in the Best Instrumental Composition category for the song "Be Water II".

== Life and career ==
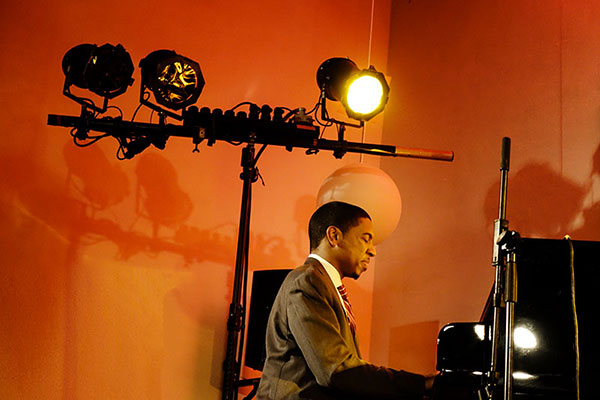
Sands in Denmark, 2015

Sands was born on May 22, 1989. He grew up in New Haven, Connecticut, and later moved to the nearby town of Orange. He started playing the piano at a very young age, and took lessons from the age of four; he commented that "I grew up with it in the house, in the classroom and on stage so it has always been a huge part of my life".

Sands was mentored by pianist Billy Taylor, who allowed the teenager to close one of the sets that Taylor played at the Kennedy Center. Sands went on to study at the Manhattan School of Music. The school's Afro-Cuban Jazz Orchestra, led by Bobby Sanabria, recorded the album Kenya Revisited Live in 2009; it was nominated for a Latin Grammy.

After graduating, Sands joined Inside Straight, one of bassist Christian McBride's bands; they have toured internationally.

Sands became a Steinway artist in 2012. In 2014, Sands cited as influences McBride, Wynton Marsalis, Kenny Garrett, and Marcus Roberts, because "They're coming from the tradition of bringing people into the music, but also moving it forward into new directions". In the same year, Sands became an American Pianists Association Jazz Fellowship Awards Finalist.

His composition "Be Water II" was nominated for the Best Instrumental Composition Grammy Award in 2020.

== Discography ==
An asterisk (*) indicates that the year is that of release.

=== As leader ===
Year recorded	Title	Label	Personnel/Notes
2002*	Footprints	Stanza	Trio, with Jeff Fuller (bass), Jesse Hameen II (drums)
2004*	Harmonia	Stanza	Trio, with James Cammack (bass), Arti Dixson (drums)
2007*	Risin'	Christian Sands	With Michael Asseta (bass), Jesse Hameen II & Ryan Sands (drums), Josh Evans (trumpet), Bill Evans (sax)
2008	Furioso	M&I	With Craig Handy (flute, tenor sax), Randy Brecker (flugelhorn, trumpet), Ugonna Okegwo (bass), Louis Hayes (drums)
2014	Take One	Storyville	Trio, with Thomas Fonnesbæk (bass), Alex Riel (drums); in concert
2017	Reach	Mack Avenue	With Marcus Baylor (drums), Yasushi Nakamura (bass), Gilad Hekselman (guitar), Christian McBride (bass), Cristian Rivera (percussion), Marcus Strickland (tenor sax, bass clarinet)
2017–2018	Reach Further	Mack Avenue	Most tracks trio with Yasushi Nakamura (bass), Jerome Jennings (drums); some tracks trio with Nakamura (bass), Marcus Baylor (drums); EP; Jennings tracks in concert
2018	Facing Dragons	Mack Avenue	With Yasushi Nakamura (bass), Jerome Jennings (drums), Marcus Strickland (sax), Keyon Harrold (trumpet), Caio Afiune (guitar), Cristian Rivera and Roberto Quintero (percussion)
2020	Be Water	Mack Avenue	With Yasushi Nakamura (bass), Clarence Penn (drums), Marcus Strickland (sax), Sean Jones (trumpet), Marvin Sewell (guitar), Steve Davis (trombone)
2023	Christmas Stories	Mack Avenue	With Jimmy Greene (sax), Stefon Harris (vibraphone), Marvin Sewell and Max Light (guitar), Yasushi Nakamura (bass), Ryan Sands (drums), Keita Ogawa (percussion)
2024	Embracing Dawn	Mack Avenue	With Yasushi Nakamura (bass), Ryan Sands (drums), Marvin Sewell (guitar), Warren Wolf (vibraphone), Grégoire Maret (harmonica)

=== As sideman ===
Year recorded	Leader	Title	Label
2009*	Bobby Sanabria	Kenya Revisited Live	
2012*	Ulysses Owens	Unanimous	Criss Cross Jazz
2013*	Christian McBride	People Music	Mack Avenue
2013*	Christian McBride	Out Here	Mack Avenue
2017*	Gregory Porter	Nat King Cole & Me	Blue Note
2019*	Jordan Pettay	First Fruit	Outside in Music
2019	Alexa Tarantino	Winds of Change	Posi-Tone
2025	Kurt Elling	Wildflowers, Vol. 3	Big Shoulders
