= Ulysses Owens =

American jazz drummer (born 1982)

Ulysses Owens Jr.
- Born: December 6, 1982 (age 43); Jacksonville, Florida, United States
- Genres: Jazz, hard bop, swing
- Occupations: Musician, producer, educator
- Instruments: Drums, percussion
- Years active: 2002–present
- Website: www.usojazzy.com

Ulysses Owens Jr. (born December 6, 1982) is an American drummer and percussionist.

He was the drummer on vocalist Kurt Elling's Grammy-winning album Dedicated to You: Kurt Elling Sings the Music of Coltrane and Hartman, and on bassist Christian McBride's Grammy-winning The Good Feeling.

== Biography ==
Owens was born in Jacksonville, Florida. He began playing the drums at the age of 3. He played many types of music in his younger years, centering on his experience in the church. By the time he was in his early teens, he realized that he would become a jazz musician, and received a full scholarship to study at the Juilliard School, in its inaugural jazz program.

Owens was the drummer on vocalist Kurt Elling's Dedicated to You: Kurt Elling Sings the Music of Coltrane and Hartman, and on bassist Christian McBride's The Good Feeling, both of which won Grammy Awards. He has also played with pianist Joey Alexander. His composition "The Simplicity of Life" was commissioned by the string quartet ETHEL for their multimedia show ETHEL's Documerica.

== Charity work ==
Owens is also the co-founder and artistic director of the charity, Don’t Miss A Beat. DMAB’s mission is “…to blend music, art, academic achievement, and civic engagement to inspire and enlighten children and teens in the Riverside and Brooklyn communities.” After graduating from Juilliard in 2006, Owens traveled the world as a jazz drummer. "I saw so many arts programs for kids, especially in other cultures, and I thought we really need something like this back home." After hearing about Jacksonville's high dropout rate and other problems with struggling youths, Owens and his family designed a program to help suspended youths stay in school. Programming also includes developing workable skills for parents so that, as noted previously, youth have self-sufficient, caring adult role models who are able to provide a safe, healthy environment for their children.

== Discography ==
=== As leader ===
- Unanimous (Criss Cross Jazz, 2012)– rec. 2011
- Ulysses Owens Jr. Big Band, Soul Conversations (Outside in Music, 2021)– rec. 2019
- Ulysses Owens Jr. and Generation Y, A New Beat (Cellar Music, 2024)
- Ulysses Owens Jr. and Generation Y, Around The World With U (Cellar Music, 2026)
- Ulysses Owens Jr. and Generation Y, Kind of Grunge (Musora, 2026)

=== As sideman ===
With Christian McBride

- Christian McBride Big Band, The Good Feeling (Mack Avenue, 2011)
- People Music (Mack Avenue, 2013)
- Out Here (Mack Avenue, 2013)
- Live at the Village Vanguard (Mack Avenue, 2015) – live rec. 2014

With others

- Joey Alexander, Countdown (Motema, 2016)
- Gregory Porter, Nat "King" Cole & Me (Blue Note, 2017)
- Matthew Whitaker, Now Hear This (Resilience, 2019)
