= Chad Lefkowitz-Brown =

American saxophonist (born 1989)

Chad LB
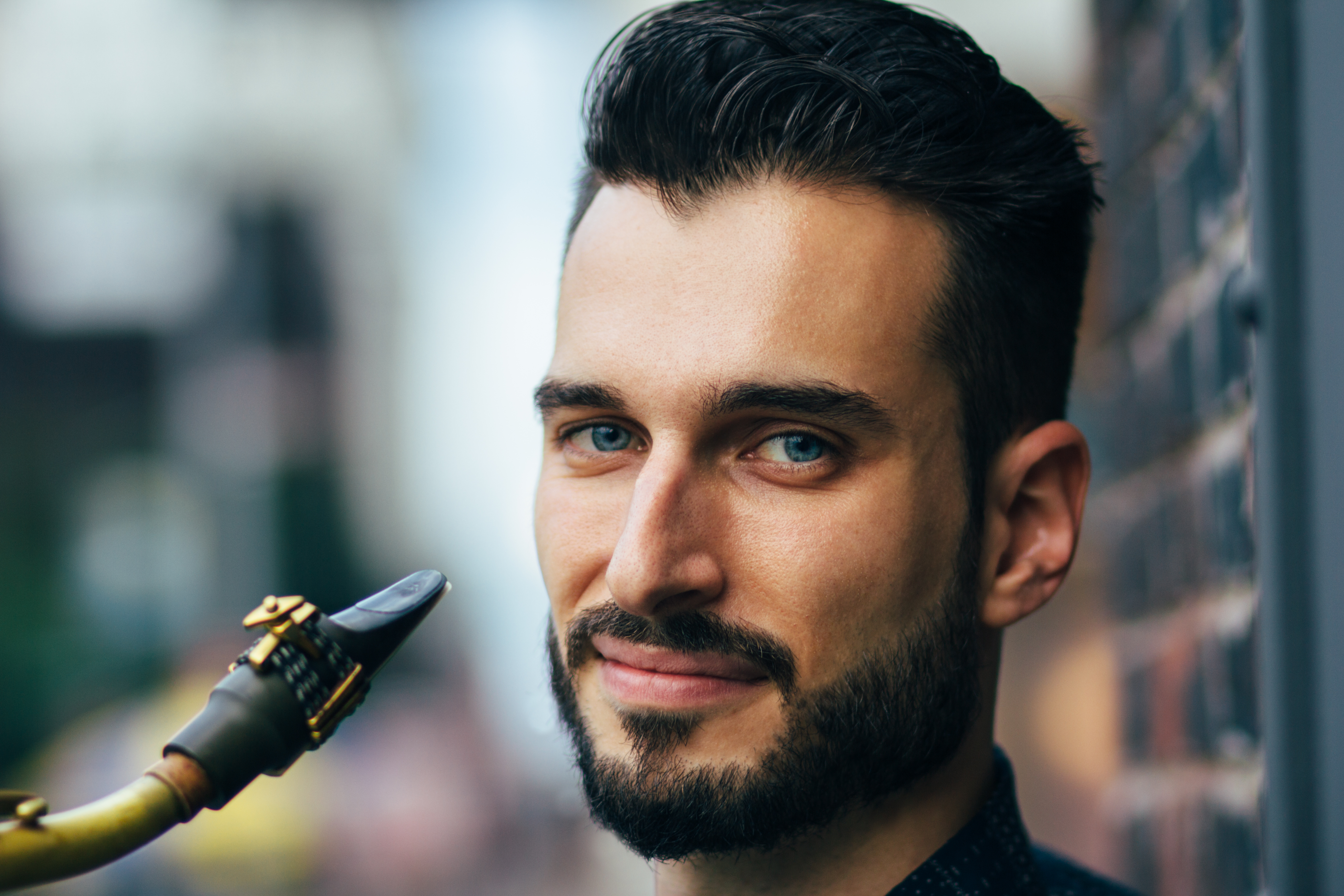

Background information
- Born: September 8, 1989 (age 37); Horseheads, New York, U.S.
- Genre: Jazz
- Occupation: Musician
- Instrument: Saxophone
- Years active: 2000s – present
- Label: Motéma Music/Origin
- Website: www.chadlb.com

Chad Lefkowitz-Brown (known as Chad LB; born September 8, 1989) is a New York-based saxophonist and recording artist recognized for his work as a soloist in the genres of jazz and pop music. He was a member of the multi Grammy winning Afro Latin Jazz Orchestra (ALJO) and has toured with popular music icon Taylor Swift. Known for his virtuosic skill, speed, and intricate lines as a jazz improviser, he is also an educator and is on faculty at the San Francisco Conservatory as a visiting artist for The Roots, Jazz, and American Music program.

== Background ==
LB started playing the saxophone at the age of 9, taught by his father, a music teacher and multi-instrumentalist. Home schooled by his father, he initially didn't enjoy playing and working out of method books. His interest was sparked when his father taught him ways he could improvise and ignited a love of jazz music by playing records, particularly featuring saxophone players. He later benefited from books written by Jerry Bergonzi and Walt Weiskopf.

LB began performing throughout the Southern Tier at age 11, working under the guidance of drummer George Reed, who backed many jazz legends during the early stages of his career, including Charlie Parker, Teddy Wilson, Buddy Tate, and Marian McPartland.

At age 18, LB was selected to be a member of the Brubeck Institute Jazz Quintet, the resident student ensemble at the Brubeck Institute, a fellowship program founded by the late jazz legend Dave Brubeck. LB studied there under the mentorship of the program's Artistic Director, Dr. Joe Gilman. During LB's residence at the institute, he recorded two albums under Gilman's name, both of which were released on Capri Records. LB also performed regularly with Dave Brubeck as a member of the Brubeck Institute Jazz Quintet at festivals and venues throughout the United States and Canada.

During LB’s scholastic career, he received a number of accolades and won numerous awards, including 15 Down Beat Magazine Student Music Awards, winning in several different categories, like "Best Jazz Soloist" and "Best Original Song."

LB currently tours globally as a soloist under his own name and with many jazz groups, including the Afro Latin Jazz Orchestra, Chris Botti, Clarence Penn, Arturo O'Farrill, Ron McClure, Quentin Angus, the Metta Quintet, and Adam O'Farrill. Since 2017, his working quartet has included pianist Steven Feifke, bassist Raviv Markovitz and drummer Jimmy MacBride, among others. LB is also on faculty as a visiting artist at the new San Francisco Conservatory of Music Roots, Jazz and American Music program, along with a number of jazz luminaries like Matt Wilson, Edward Simon, Julian Lage and Sean Jones.

== Discography ==
=== As Leader ===
- 2013: Imagery Manifesto (Independent)
- 2017: Onward (Independent)
- 2018: Electric Band: 2013-2014 (Independent)
- 2018: Standard Sessions (Independent)
- 2021: Quartet Sessions (La Reserve)

==== With Chad LB Virtual Big Band ====
- 2020: Quarantine Standards (Sound Frame)

==== With Chad LB & Sonic Magic ====
- 2019: Chad LB & Sonic Magic (Independent)
- 2019: Live at the Bridge (Independent)

==== With Rosenberg-Lefkowitz Quintet ====
- 2011: RLQ (Independent)

=== As Sideman ===
- Raviv Markowitz - Pulse (Independent)
- Steven Feifke – Peace in Time (Independent)
- Arturo O'Farrill and the Afro Latin Jazz Orchestra – The Offense of the Drum (Motéma Music)
- Clarence Penn – Monk: The Lost Files (Origin Records)
- Adam O'Farrill's Stranger Days – "El Maquech" (Biophilia records)
- Adam O'Farrill – Stranger Days (Sunnyside Records)
- Isaac Darche – Team and Variations (Challenge Records)
- Jorn Swart – A Day In The Life or Boriz (Mainland Records)
- Ron McClure – Ready Or Not (SteepleChase Records)
- Phillip Phillips – Behind the Light (Interscope Records)
- Natalie Cressman – Secret Garden (Independent)
- Quentin Angus – Retrieval Structure (Independent)
- Joe Gilman – Relativity (Capri Records)
- Joe Gilman – Americanvas (Capri Records)
- Hironori Momoi – Liquid Knots (Independent)
