= Dianne Reeves discography =

- Studio albums: 16
- Soundtrack albums: 1
- Live albums: 4
- Compilation albums: 2
- Christmas: 1

This is the discography of Dianne Reeves, an American jazz singer.

== Studio albums ==
List of studio albums, with selected chart positions
| Title | Album details | Peak chart positions | | | | | Notes |
| Title | Album details | US | US R&B | US Jazz | FRA | NED | Notes |
|---|---|---|---|---|---|---|---|
| Welcome to My Love | Released: 1982; Label: Palo Alto | — | — | — | — | — | |
| For Every Heart | Released: 1984; Label: Palo Alto/TBA Records | — | — | — | — | — | |
| Dianne Reeves | Released: 1987; Label: Blue Note | 172 | 28 | — | — | — | |
| The Nearness of You | Released: 1988; Label: Blue Note | — | — | — | — | — | |
| Never Too Far | Released: 1990; Label: EMI USA | 81 | 14 | — | — | — | |
| I Remember | Released: 1991; Label: Blue Note | — | — | — | — | — | |
| Art & Survival | Released: 1994; Label: EMI USA | — | 93 | 19 | — | — | |
| Quiet After the Storm | Released: 1994; Label: Blue Note | — | — | 17 | — | — | Reeves' 1st nomination for Grammy Award for Best Jazz Vocal Performance |
| The Grand Encounter | Released: 1996; Label: Blue Note | — | — | 28 | — | — | |
| That Day... | Released: 1997; Label: Blue Note | — | — | 24 | — | — | Reeves' 2nd nomination for Grammy Award for Best Jazz Vocal Performance |
| Bridges | Released: 1999; Label: Blue Note | — | — | 14 | — | — | Reeves' 3rd nomination for Grammy Award for Best Jazz Vocal Performance |
| The Calling: Celebrating Sarah Vaughan | Released: 2001; Label: Blue Note | — | — | 8 | — | — | Reeves' 2nd win of Grammy Award for Best Jazz Vocal Album |
| A Little Moonlight | Released: 2003; Label: Blue Note | — | — | 5 | 77 | — | Reeves' 3rd win of Grammy Award for Best Jazz Vocal Album |
| When You Know | Released: 2008; Label: Blue Note | — | — | 6 | 94 | — | |
| Beautiful Life | Released: 2013; Label: Concord Jazz | — | — | 3 | — | 86 | Reeves' 5th win of Grammy Award for Best Jazz Vocal Album |
"—" denotes a recording that did not chart or was not released in that territory.

=== Christmas albums ===
List of compilation albums, with selected chart positions
| Title | Album details | Peak chart positions |
| Title | Album details | US Jazz |
|---|---|---|
| Christmas Time Is Here | Released: September 28, 2004; Label: Blue Note | 17 |

=== Soundtrack albums ===
List of compilation albums, with selected chart positions
| Title | Album details | Peak chart positions | Notes |
| Title | Album details | US Jazz | Notes |
|---|---|---|---|
| Good Night, and Good Luck | Released: September 27, 2005; Label: Concord Jazz | 4 | Reeves' 4th win of Grammy Award for Best Jazz Vocal Album |

== Live albums ==
List of compilation albums, with selected chart positions
| Title | Album details | Peak chart positions | Notes |
| Title | Album details | US Jazz | Notes |
|---|---|---|---|
| Echoes of Ellington Vol. 1 (with Randy Brecker, Tom Scott, Robben Ford, Bill Evans) | Released: 1987; Label: PolyGram | — | |
| New Morning | Released: 1997; Label: Blue Note | — | |
| In the Moment – Live in Concert | Released: 2000; Label: Blue Note | 14 | Reeves' 1st win of Grammy Award for Best Jazz Vocal Album |
| The World of Duke Ellington Vol. 2 (with John Clayton, Ray Brown, Jeff Hamilton, Benny Green) | Released: 2008; Label: BHM Productions | — | |

== Compilation albums ==
List of compilation albums, with selected chart positions
| Title | Album details | Peak chart positions |
| Title | Album details | US Jazz |
|---|---|---|
| The Palo Alto Sessions 1981-1985 | Released: 1996; Label: Blue Note | — |
| The Best of Dianne Reeves | Released: 2002; Label: Blue Note | 21 |
| Music for Lovers | Released: 2006; Label: Blue Note | — |

== Singles ==
List of singles, with selected chart positions, showing year released and album name
| Title | Year | Peak chart positions | | | Album |
| Title | Year | US Adult | US R&B | US Smooth | Album |
|---|---|---|---|---|---|
| "Better Days" | 1988 | — | 44 | — | Dianne Reeves |
| "Never Said (Chan's Song)" | 1988 | — | — | — | Dianne Reeves |
| "Never Too Far" | 1990 | 45 | 5 | — | Never Too Far |
| "Come In" | 1990 | — | 34 | — | Never Too Far |
| "More to Love" | 1990 | — | 45 | — | Never Too Far |
| "When Morning Comes" | 1995 | — | — | — | Quiet After the Storm |
| "I Want You" (featuring Sean Jones) | 2014 | — | — | 11 | Beautiful Life |
| "Waiting In Vain" (featuring Lalah Hathaway) | 2014 | — | — | 25 | Beautiful Life |
"—" denotes a recording that did not chart or was not released in that territory.

=== Promotional singles ===
List of promotional singles, showing year released and album name
| Title | Year | Album |
|---|---|---|
| "Who Knows Where Love Goes" | 1983 | For Every Heart |
| "Afro Blue" | 1991 | I Remember |
| "Just My Imagination" | 2008 | When You Know |

== Other charted songs ==
| Title | Year | Peak chart positions | Album |
| Title | Year | JPN | Album |
|---|---|---|---|
| "Lovin' You" | 2008 | 93 | When You Know |

== Guest appearances ==
- 1975: Best of Ronnie Laws
- 1976: Yesterday's Dreams (Alphonso Johnson)
- 1977: Comin' Through (Eddie Henderson); From Me to You (George Duke); Sky Islands (Caldera)
- 1978: Black Forest (Luis Conte); Kinsman Dazz (Kinsman Dazz); Steamline (Lenny White) (background vocals); Time and Chance (Caldera)
- 1979: Splendor (Splendor)
- 1981: Seduzir (Djavan)
- 1981: Tender Togetherness (Stanely Turrentine)
- 1984: Fiesta (Victor Feldman)
- 1985: Ebony Rain (Mark Winkler); Magnetic (Steps Ahead); Streetshadows (David Diggs)
- 1986: This Side Up (David Benoit)
- 1988: Joy Rider (Wayne Shorter)
- 1989: At Last (Lou Rawls); Ballads (Lou Rawls); Best of Feldman and the Generation Band (Victor Feldman's Generation Band); Straight to My Heart: The Music of Sting (Bob Belden Ensemble)
- 1990: Nova Collection '90 (Various); Yule Struttin' (Various)
- 1991: Continuing the Legacy of Black Music... (Various); Free Play (Eduardo Del Barrio); Keys to Life (Ben Tankard)
- 1992: Christmas Carols & Sacred Songs (Boys Choir of Harlem); Handel's Messiah: A Soulful Celebration (Various); Legendary Lou Rawls (Lou Rawls); Moonlight Love: Soft Sounds for a Summer Night (Various)
- 1993: Journey (McCoy Tyner Big Band); Let Your Love Flow (Solomon Burke)(background vocals); When the Time is Right (Javon Jackson)
- 1994: Blue Note Now! (Various); For the Love of Music (Lionel Hampton); I've Known Rivers (Billy Childs); Shades of Blue (Bob Belden)
- 1995: Esquire Jazz Collection: Crosstown Traffic (Various); Jazz to the World (Various); Rhythm & Blues Christmas [CEMA] (Various); Today's Stars Sing Holiday Classics (Various)
- 1996: Benny Carter Songbook (Benny Carter)
- 1996: Bob Beldon Presents Strawberry Fields (Various); Doky Brothers, Vol. 2 (Niels Lan Doky & Chris Minh Doky); Never Ending Game, Vol. 1 (Dreadformation); New Groove: The Blue Note Remix Project, Vol. 1 (Various); Panasonic Village Jazz Festival 1996 (Various); Place of Hope (Various); Soulful Sounds of Christmas [One Way] (Various); Strawberry Fields (Bob Belden); World Christmas (Various)
- 1997: 1997 Panasonic Village Jazz Festival (Various); Best of George Duke: The Elektra Years (George Duke) (background vocals); Fiesta & More (Victor Feldman); Is Love Enough?(George Duke) (background vocals); Last Time I Committed Suicide (Original Soundtrack); Monk on Monk (T.S. Monk); Sample This (Joe Sample); Sleep Warm (Various); Slow Jams: On the Jazz Tip, Vol. 1 (Various); Soul Control (Gerald Veasley); That Old Feeling (Original Soundtrack); Yule Be Boppin' (Various); Great Jazz Vocalists Sing Strayhorn & Ellington (Various); Ultimate Nina Simone (Nina Simone)
- 1998 :Afro-Cuban Fantasy (Poncho Sanchez); Blue Box, Vol. 2: Finest Jazz Vocalists (Various); Blue Note Salutes Motown (Various); Blue Note Years 1939–1999(Various); Chez Toots (Toots Thielemans); Colors of a Band (Peter Herbolzheimer); Minh Chris (Minh Doky); Seasons 4 U (Lou Rawls); Soulful Divas, Vol. 3: Softly with a Song (Various); Soulful Divas, Vol. 5: Ladies of Jazz N Soul (Various); Ultimate Divas [Box] (Various); We've Got What You Need (James Williams & ICU)
- 1999: Afro Blue (Various); Art & Soul (Renee Rosnes); Beach Music Anthology, Vol. 2 (Various); Best Blue Note Album in the World Ever (Various); Billboard Top Contemporary Jazz (Various); Blue Movies: Scoring for the Studio (Various); Blue Note Years, Vol. 6: New Era 1975–1998 (Various); Blue Note Years, Vol. 7: Blue Note Now & Then (Various); Blue Valentines (Various); Down Here Below (Jeffery Smith); Edge (Lenny White); Jazznavour (Charles Aznavour); Just the Ticket (Original Soundtrack) (background vocals); Live at the Blue Note: 75th Birthday Celebration (Chico & Von Freeman); Live in Swing City: Swingin' with the Duke (Lincoln Center Jazz Orchestra & Wynton Marsalis); Manhattan Melodies (Eric Reed); Native Voices (Various); R 'N' Browne (Tom Browne); Tribute to Ellington (Daniel Barenboim)
- 2000: 30 Years of Montreux Jazz Festival (Various); Anthology (Eddie Henderson) (background vocals); Going Home: Tribute To Duke Ellington (Various); Love Affair: The Music of Ivan Lins (Jason Miles/Various); Never Gonna Give Up (Lorrich); Pure Cool (Various); Sci-Fi (Christian McBride); Smooth and Straight (Various); Smooth Grooves: Jazzy Soul, Vol. 2(Various); Yesterday, Today and Tomorrow (Rodney Whitaker)
- 2001: Dear Louis (Nicholas Payton); Identity Crisis (Affirmation); Let's Get Lost: The Songs of Jimmy McHugh (Terence Blanchard); Phonography (DJ Smash); With a Little Help From My Friends (Renee Rosnes)
- 2002: Café (Trio da Paz); I Heard It on NPR: Jazz for Blue Nights (Various); Incredible Solomon Burke at His Best (Solomon Burke) (background vocals); Lenny White Collection (Lenny White); Pump It Up (Les McCann); Tom Browne Collection (Tom Browne)
- 2003: I Heard It on NPR CD Box Set: Jazz for Blue Nights (Various); Midnight Music (Various); Wise Children (Tom Harrell)
- 2004: Blue Note Plays the Beatles (Various); Colors of Latin Jazz: Música Romántica (Various): The Magic Hour (Wynton Marsalis)
- 2006: The Phat Pack (Gordon Goodwin's Big Phat Band)
- 2014: Map to the Treasure: Reimagining Laura Nyro (Billy Childs)
- 2024: Milton + Esperanza (Milton Nascimento, Esperanza Spalding)
- 2025: Without Further Ado, Vol 1 (Christian McBride)
