= Dreamer (Caldera album) =

Studio album by Caldera
- Released: January 1, 1979; January 1, 1995 (re-release)
- Recorded: Hollywood Sound, December 1978 – January 1979
- Genres: Jazz fusion, latin jazz, progressive rock
- Length: 43:13
- Label: Capitol
- Producers: Eduardo del Barrio, Jorge Strunz, Steve Tavaglione and John Palladino

Caldera chronology
Time and Chance (1978)	Dreamer (1979)

Dreamer is the fourth and final album by the jazz fusion group Caldera.

== Critical reception ==
Professional ratings
Review scores
Source	Rating
AllMusic	4.5/5 stars
Record Mirror	3.5/5 stars

Alex Henderson of AllMusic, where it received a 4.5 out of 5 stars rating, wrote "Caldera's fans -- something it didn't have nearly enough of -- hoped that Dreamer would be the LP to make the band famous in the jazz-fusion world. But Caldera continued to be obscure, despite providing an adventurous, captivating mixture of jazz, funk, rock, and Latin music. True to form, the writing is excellent on this album...For Caldera, the term "Latin music" meant a variety of things—everything from Spanish flamenco and Afro-Cuban salsa to Brazilian samba and Andean music—and on this LP, all of those things successfully interact with jazz, funk, and rock." Paul Sexton of Record Mirror gave Dreamer a 3.5 out of 5 stars rating. Sexton praised the album saying "Dreamer is one of the most exciting jazz fusion albums I've heard for a long time."

== Track listing ==
1. "To Capture the Moon" (Eduardo del Barrio) – 5:00
2. "Rain Forest" (Jorge Strunz) – 8:06
3. "Dream Child" (Eduardo del Barrio) – 5:12
4. "Celebration" (George del Barrio) – 4:35
5. "Reflections on Don Quixote" (Eduardo del Barrio) – 7:11
6. "Brujerias" (Eduardo del Barrio, Jorge Strunz) – 6:02
7. "Himalaya" (Jorge Strunz) – 7:04

== Personnel ==
- Jorge Strunz — acoustic guitar, electric guitar, chant
- Eduardo del Barrio — acoustic piano, electric piano, Oberheim Polyphonic, Mini Moog, Prophet 5 synthesizers, percussion, chant (on 7), palmas (on 6)
- Steve Tavaglione — alto saxophone, soprano saxophone, flute, bamboo flute
- Mike Azeredo — congas, percussion
- Greg Lee — electric bass
- Luis Conte — congas, timbales, batá, chant
- Alex Acuña — drums, batá

=== Guests ===
- George del Barrio — Fender Rhodes (track 4 only)
- Dean Cortez — bass (track 7 only)
- Gino D'Anri — flamenco guitar (track 6 only)
- Antonio Sanchez — palmas (track 6 only)
- Ernesto Herrera — palmas (track 6 only)
- Kathlyn Powell — Celtic harp (track 7 only)
