= Raul de Souza =

Brazilian trombonist (1934–2021)

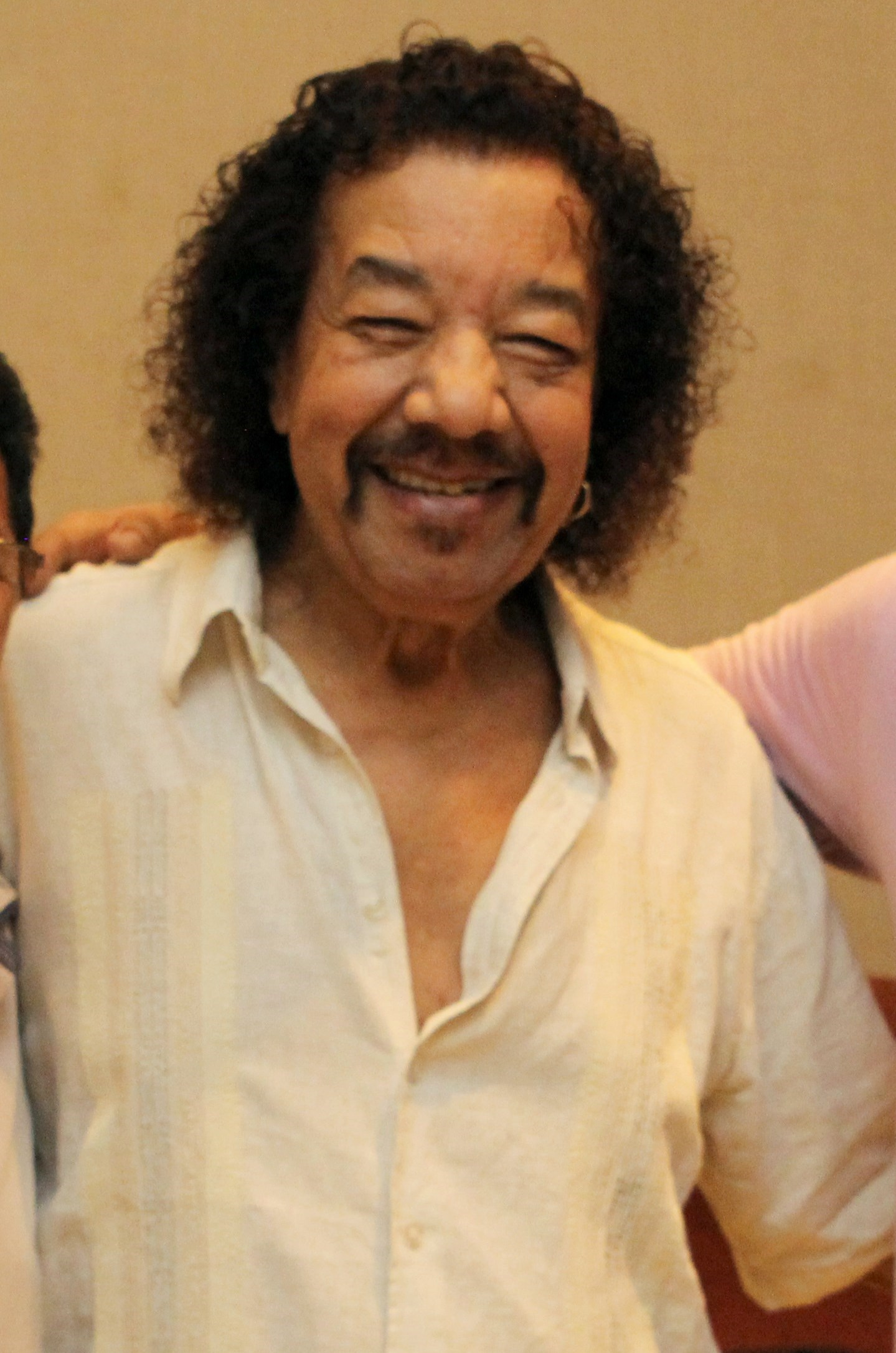
Raul de Souza in 2014

Raul de Souza (23 August 1934 -– 23 June 2021), also known as Raulzinho, was a Brazilian trombonist who recorded with Sérgio Mendes, Flora Purim, Airto Moreira, Milton Nascimento, Sonny Rollins, Azar Lawrence, Hermeto Pascoal, Cal Tjader and the jazz/fusion band Caldera.

== Life and career ==
De Souza was born in Rio de Janeiro. American producer, composer and pianist George Duke was brought in to produce de Souza's first and second album releases for Capitol in the mid-1970s, Sweet Lucy and Don't Ask My Neighbors. In 1979, de Souza released 'Til Tomorrow Comes, an Arthur Wright production with many of the top soul session players in Los Angeles.

Colors, his earlier album for Milestone, is available on CD as part of the Original Jazz Classics series from Fantasy Records.

In the early 1960s, he was a member of Sérgio Mendes’ original Bossa Rio group. In the late ’60s, a second, more pop-oriented Bossa Rio group was led by keyboardist Manfredo Fest (Mendes was the producer of their two albums).

He appeared at many international jazz festivals and after living and working in the United States for many years, he had returned to live in Brazil where he continued to play and compose.

De Souza died at age 86 in France on 13 June 2021 from throat cancer.

== Discography ==
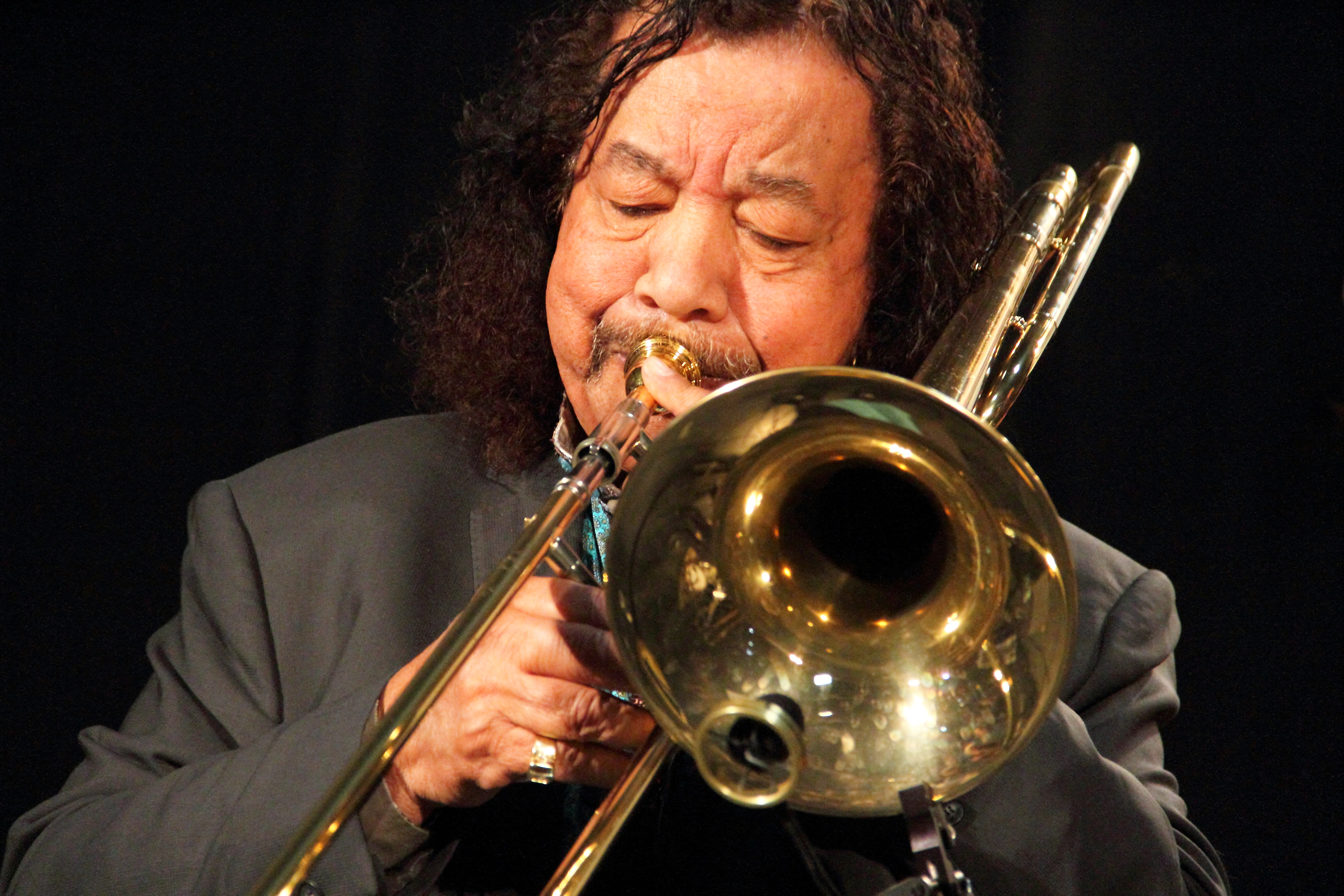
Raul de Souza in 2018

=== As leader ===
- Colors (Milestone, 1975)
- Sweet Lucy (Capitol, 1977)
- Don't Ask My Neighbors (Capitol/EMI, 1978)
- 'Til Tomorrow Comes (Capitol, 1979)
- Viva Volta Inverno & Verao, (RGE, 1986)
- 20 Preferidas (RGE, 1996)
- Rio (Mix House, 1999)
- Elixir (Tratore, 2004)
- Jazzmim (Biscoito Fino, 2006)
- Soul & Creation (PAO, 2008)
- Bossa Eterna (Biscoito Fino, 2008)
- Brazilian Samba Jazz (Encore Merci, 2016)
- Blue Voyage (Selo, 2018)
- Curitiba 58 (Gramofone, 2019)
- Plenitude (PAO, 2021)

=== As sideman ===
- Caldera, Caldera (Capitol/EMI, 1976)
- Azar Lawrence, Summer Solstice (Prestige, 1975)
- David Feldman, Horizonte (2016)
- Hermeto Pascoal, Slaves Mass (Warner Bros., 1977)
