= Sky Islands (Caldera album) =

Studio album by Caldera
- Released: April 28, 1977; 1993 (re-release)
- Recorded: December 1976 – January 1977
- Studio: Indigo Ranch
- Genre: Jazz-funk
- Length: 38:42
- Label: Capitol
- Producers: Eduardo del Barrio, Larry Dunn, Jorge Strunz and Larkin Arnold

Caldera chronology
Caldera (1976)	Sky Islands (1977)	Time and Chance (1978)

Sky Islands is the second album by Jazz fusion group Caldera released in 1977 on Capitol Records. The album reached No. 18 on the Cashbox Top 40 Jazz Albums chart.

== Critical reception ==
Professional ratings
Review scores
Source	Rating
AllMusic	3.5/5 stars
All About Jazz	4.5/5 stars

Jakob Baekgaard of All About Jazz, gave Sky Islands a 4.5 out of 5 stars rating. Baekgaard took note that "Caldera's musical vision is widescreen and cinematic, but the wondrous thing is that it never becomes too much, which has always been the danger of fusion. In some cases, the grand gestures can turn into mannerisms. Caldera keeps the wide soundscapes in check with organically earthy rhythms and a perfect balance between electric and acoustic. The result is a sound that is surprisingly contemporary and, rather than being a journey back in time, revisiting these records is just as much a peek into the future."

Alex Henderson of AllMusic, in a 3.5 out of 5 stars rating, found that "While Caldera's first LP was produced by Wayne Henderson, Sky Islands finds Strunz and del Barrio doing the producing with Earth, Wind & Fire keyboardist Larry Dunn -- who was a logical choice considering that EWF was among Caldera's many influences. At times, they tend to over-produce. But the writing is consistently superb, and all things considered, Sky Islands makes good on the promise of the band's previous album."

== Covers ==
The album's title track was covered by Dianne Reeves on her 1987 self titled album and Ramsey Lewis on his 1993 LP Sky Islands.

A version of "Ancient Source" resulted from the collaboration between Herb Alpert and Caldera keyboardist Eddie del Barrio and appeared on Alpert's 1988 release Under a Spanish Moon.

== Track listing ==
No.	Title	Writer(s)	Length
1.	"Sky Islands"	Larry Dunn	6:07
2.	"Ancient Source"	Eduardo del Barrio, Ernesto J.Herrera	4:30
3.	"It Used to Be"	Eduardo del Barrio	1:12
4.	"Pegasus"	Eduardo del Barrio, Jorge Strunz	4:56
5.	"Carnavalito"	Eduardo del Barrio	4:51
6.	"Seraphim (Angel)"	Larry Dunn	4:46
7.	"Indigo Fire"	Jorge Strunz	1:06
8.	"Triste"	George del Barrio	6:50
9.	"Pescador (Fisherman)"	Mike Azevedo	1:04

== Personnel ==
- Jorge Strunz — acoustic guitar, electric guitar, percussion
- Eduardo del Barrio — acoustic piano, electric piano, synthesizers, Moog, Roland, Oberheim Polyphonic
- Steve Tavaglione — flute, alto flute, soprano saxophone, alto saxophone, tenor saxophone
- Mike Azeredo — congas, percussion
- Carlos Vega — drums
- Dean Cortez — electric bass
- Hector Andrade — timbales, congas, percussion
- Ernesto Herrera — lyricist

=== Guests ===
- Larry Dunn — synthesizer (solo on track 2)
- Roberto da Silva — percussion
- Dianne Reeves — vocals (tracks 1 and 2)
- Chester Thompson — drums (track 4 only)
- Ralph Humphrey — drums (track 1 only)
- Ralph Rickert — flugelhorn (track 8 only)
- Ray Armando — percussion
- Steve Barrio, Jr. — percussion
- Paul Shure — violin
- Bonnie Douglas — violin
- Harry Bluestone — violin
- Marshall Sosson — violin
- Nathan Ross — violin
- Antol Kaminsky — violin
- Jack Pepper — violin
- Irma Neumann — violin
- Janet Lakatos — viola
- Louis Kievman — viola
- Fredrick Seykora — cello
- Selene Hurford — cello
- Shusei Nagaoka — cover art
