= Time and Chance (Caldera album) =

Studio album by Caldera
- Released: 1978; 1994 (re-release)
- Recorded: December 1977 – January 1978
- Studio: Hollywood Sound
- Genres: Jazz fusion, jazz rock, progressive rock
- Length: 45:16
- Label: Capitol
- Producers: Eduardo del Barrio, Larry Dunn, Jorge Strunz, Steve Tavaglione, Larkin Arnold

Caldera chronology
| Sky Islands (1977) | Time and Chance (1978) | Dreamer (1979) |

Time and Chance is the third studio album by the jazz fusion band Caldera, released in 1978 on Capitol Records. The album rose to No. 29 on the Billboard Jazz Albums chart.

== Critical reception ==
Professional ratings
Review scores
| Source | Rating |
|---|---|
| AllMusic | 4/5 stars |

Alex Henderson of AllMusic wrote "As strong as Caldera and Sky Islands were, neither album made Caldera a big name in the jazz-fusion world; nor did the band's third album, Time and Chance. Quite possibly, a lot of the fusion lovers who were craving Return to Forever, Weather Report, and Al Di Meola in the 1970s would have appreciated Caldera as well if they had been exposed to their music. But the band never caught on and only had a very small following. You can't blame that on Caldera's material, for the writing of Jorge Strunz and Eduardo del Barrio is excellent on this LP. The band's imaginative nature is hard to miss on instrumentals that range from the flamenco-influenced "Mosaico" and the optimistic "Revivisence" to the Al Did Meola-ish "Horizon's End."

== Track listing ==
| No. | Title | Writer(s) | Length |
|---|---|---|---|
| 1. | "The Arousing" | Eduardo del Barrio | 2:50 |
| 2. | "Reviviscence" | Eduardo del Barrio | 7:00 |
| 3. | "Mosaico" | Eduardo del Barrio, Jorge Strunz | 7:00 |
| 4. | "Magewind" | George del Barrio | 1:34 |
| 5. | "Crosscountry" | George del Barrio | 5:24 |
| 6. | "Passages" | Eduardo del Barrio | 7:30 |
| 7. | "Dreamborne" | Jorge Strunz | 1:40 |
| 8. | "Shanti" | Larry Dunn | 4:00 |
| 9. | "Horizon's End" | Jorge Strunz | 8:18 |

== Personnel ==
- Jorge Strunz — acoustic guitar, electric guitar
- Eduardo del Barrio — acoustic piano, electric piano, synthesizers, Moog, Roland, Oberheim Polyphonic, Yamaha Polyphonic
- Steve Tavaglione — flute, alto saxophone, soprano saxophone
- Mike Azeredo — congas, percussion
- Carlos Vega — drums
- Greg Lee — electric bass, Moog bass pedals
- Hector Andrade — timbales, congas, percussion

=== Guests ===
- Larry Dunn — synthesizer (track 8)
- Roberto da Silva — drums (track 8 only)
- Alex Acuña — drums (tracks 1, 2, 3, 4, 5, 6, 7 and 9)
- Luis Conte — bata, conga and timbales (track 9 only)
- Akim Robert Davis — bata (track 9 only)
- George del Barrio — acoustic piano (track 4 only), electric piano (track 5 only)
- Charles Faris — digital aquasonic modulator (track 8 only)
- Dianne Reeves — background vocals (tracks 8 only)
- Michelle Wiley — background vocals (tracks 8 only)
- Ella Faulk — background vocals (tracks 8 only)
