= Christmas Time Is Here (Dianne Reeves album) =

Studio album by Dianne Reeves
- Released: 2004
- Genres: Vocal jazz; smooth jazz
- Length: 47:55
- Label: Blue Note
- Producers: Dianne Reeves, Peter Martin

Dianne Reeves chronology
A Little Moonlight (2003)	Christmas Time Is Here (2004)	Good Night and Good Luck (2005)

Professional ratings
Review scores
Source	Rating
AllMusic	3/5 stars
All About Jazz	3.5/5 stars

Christmas Time Is Here is a studio album by American jazz singer Dianne Reeves. The album peaked at No. 17 on the US Billboard Top Jazz Albums chart and No. 9 on the US Billboard Traditional Jazz Albums chart.

== Reception ==
All About Jazz described the album as "an above-average and sometimes spectacular album that doesn't deserve to compete with screaming kids and tearing paper for the listener's ear."

== Track listing ==
No.	Title	Length
1.	"Little Drummer Boy"	5:02
2.	"Carol of the Bells"	3:57
3.	"Christmas Time Is Here"	3:21
4.	"This Time of the Year"	4:55
5.	"Christmas Waltz"	3:42
6.	"I'll Be Home for Christmas"	5:28
7.	"Christ Child's Lullaby"	3:48
8.	"A Child Is Born"	5:01
9.	"This Christmas Song (Chestnuts)"	5:30
10.	"Let It Snow"	3:24
11.	"Have Yourself a Merry Little Christmas"	4:19
