= I Remember (Dianne Reeves album) =

Studio album by Dianne Reeves
- Released: 1991
- Studio: Mad Hatter, Los Angeles, CA
- Genre: Vocal jazz
- Length: 44:57
- Label: EMI

Dianne Reeves chronology
Never Too Far (1989)	I Remember (1991)	Art & Survival (1994)

I Remember is a studio album by American jazz singer Dianne Reeves, released in 1991 on EMI Records. The album peaked at No. 1 on the US Billboard Traditional Jazz Albums chart.

== Critical reception ==
Professional ratings
Review scores
Source	Rating
AllMusic	5/5 stars

Jay Roebuck of the Orange County Register declared, "Dianne Reeves is one of the premier singers in jazz. She has a voice and range that bring Sarah Vaughan to mind, but she definitely has her own style... This is Dianne Reeves' best CD to date."

Scott Yanow of AllMusic wrote, "When she wants to sing jazz, Dianne Reeves has always had the ability to reach the top of her field, but she has long seemed unable to make up her mind between jazz, R&B, world music, and pop. This Blue Note disc fortunately finds her mostly sticking to jazz and in consistently superb form."

Karl Stark of the Miami Herald praised the album, saying, "In I Remember, singer Dianne Reeves drops a little of her pop-lite persona and puts out some exciting, hard-core stuff, fulfilling some of her awesome potential."

== Track listing ==
No.	Title	Writer(s)	Length
1.	"Afro Blue"	Mongo Santamaria, Oscar Brown Jr.	4:49
2.	"The Nearness of You/Misty"	Erroll Garner, Hoagy Carmichael, Johnny Burke, Ned Washington	3:12
3.	"I Remember Sky"	Stephen Sondheim	4:23
4.	"Love for Sale"	Cole Porter	3:43
5.	"Softly as in the Morning Sunrise"	Oscar Hammerstein, Sigmund Romberg	4:52
6.	"Like a Lover"	Alan Bergman, Marilyn Bergman, Dori Caymmi	5:37
7.	"How High the Moon"	Morgan Lewis, Nancy Hamilton	4:05
8.	"You Taught My Heart to Sing"	McCoy Tyner, Sammy Cahn	6:14
9.	"For All We Know"	J. Fred Coots, Sam Lewis	8:02
