= Good Night, and Good Luck (Music from and Inspired by the Motion Picture) =

2005 film soundtrack album

Soundtrack album by Dianne Reeves
- Released: September 27, 2005
- Genres: Jazz; vocal jazz
- Length: 51:09
- Label: Concord

Dianne Reeves chronology
Christmas Time Is Here (2004)	Good Night, and Good Luck (Music from and Inspired by the Motion Picture) (2005)	Music For Lovers (2006)

Good Night, and Good Luck (Music from and Inspired by the Motion Picture) is the soundtrack album to the 2005 film Good Night, and Good Luck directed by George Clooney. The album accompanied several cover versions of 1960s jazz songs performed by Dianne Reeves and a combo of jazz singers. The soundtrack album was released through Concord Records on September 27, 2005 and won the Grammy Award in 2006 for Best Jazz Vocal Album.

== Background ==
A small jazz combo starring jazz singer Dianne Reeves was hired to record the film's soundtrack. This combo—Peter Martin, Christoph Luty, Jeff Hamilton and Matt Catingub—was featured in several scenes; for example, in one scene the newsmen pass a studio where she is recording with the rest of the band. The album accompanied several jazz standards of 1940s to 1960s which includes "How High the Moon", "I've Got My Eyes on You", "Too Close For Comfort", "Straighten Up and Fly Right" and "One for My Baby". Most of the jazz musical numbers were recorded live. The album was released through Concord Records on September 27, 2005.

== Track listing ==
No.	Title	Length
1.	"Straighten Up and Fly Right"	2:44
2.	"I've Got My Eyes on You"	2:06
3.	"Gotta Be This or That"	3:16
4.	"Too Close for Comfort"	3:50
5.	"How High the Moon"	2:22
6.	"Who's Minding the Store?"	4:31
7.	"You're Driving Me Crazy"	1:57
8.	"Pretend"	4:01
9.	"Solitude"	5:28
10.	"TV Is the Thing This Year"	1:43
11.	"Pick Yourself Up"	2:38
12.	"When I Fall in Love"	3:52
13.	"Into Each Life Some Rain Must Fall"	4:08
14.	"There'll Be Another Spring"	4:43
15.	"One for My Baby"	3:50
Total length:		51:09

== Reception ==
Tim Sendra of AllMusic wrote "Had Clooney chosen songs actually recorded in the '50s, the soundtrack may have been more authentic, but Reeves and her group do a commendable job of re-creating the simple and sentimental sound of the era's mainstream vocal jazz." Jim Santella of All About Jazz wrote "For the most part, however, singer and tenor saxophone combine with piano trio to place the viewer in a nightclub setting where smoke fills the room and everyone knows how to relax." Critic based at JazzWise wrote "the songs she delivers are exquisite".

== Chart performance ==
Chart (2006)	Peak position
US Jazz Albums (Billboard)	13

== Accolades ==
Award / Association / Film festival	Date of ceremony	Category	Recipient(s)	Result	Ref(s)
Grammy Awards	February 8, 2006	Best Jazz Vocal Album	Dianne Reeves (for Good Night, and Good Luck)	Won	
Women Film Critics Circle	December 28, 2005	Best Soundtrack	Dianne Reeves	Won	
