= George del Barrio =

Argentine-American composer, arranger, conductor and keyboardist

- Born: Jorge Gutierrez del Barrio; February 26, 1932; Argentina
- Died: August 11, 2012 (aged 80)
- Occupations: Composer; arranger; conductor; keyboardist
- Children: Raymond del Barrio; George "Gibi" del Barrio
- Relatives: Eduardo "Eddie" del Barrio (brother); Ramón "Minty" Gutiérrez del Barrio (brother)
- Musical career
- Instruments: Piano; keyboards
- Years active: 1960s–2000s

George del Barrio (born Jorge Gutierrez del Barrio; February 26, 1932 – August 11, 2012) was an Argentine-American composer, arranger, conductor and keyboardist. His credits included work with Herb Alpert, Michael Jackson, Earth, Wind & Fire, Stanley Clarke, George Duke, Philip Bailey, Deniece Williams, Jeffrey Osborne, Barry Manilow, Chayanne, Shelby Lynne and Toby Keith.

== Early life and background ==
Del Barrio was born in Mendoza, Argentina. He was classically trained in music, through his family's musical background, alongside his brother, pianist and composer Eddie del Barrio. He relocated to the United States and began working in Los Angeles on recording sessions and television scores, playing keyboards and writing and conducting arrangements.

== Career ==
Del Barrio arranged and conducted for Perry Como, Abbe Lane, Vikki Carr and Al Jarreau. In 1964, del Barrio conducted Abbe Lane's orchestra during her engagement at the Shoreham Hotel in Washington, D.C.

During the 1970s, del Barrio worked with the jazz fusion group Caldera. He arranged and conducted the strings on the 1977 album Sky Islands and composed "Triste".

Del Barrio arranged and conducted strings for Stanley Turrentine's Tender Togetherness (1981). He played keyboards and contributed arrangements to Earth, Wind & Fire's Powerlight (1983).

Del Barrio composed the three-part suite "Under a Spanish Moon" for Herb Alpert. He was the arranger and conductor and played piano on Alpert's album Under a Spanish Moon. In 1988, del Barrio worked with Alpert on his first solo orchestral tour. Herb Alpert said he hired George del Barrio to "take some of the evergreens and augment them for orchestra, along with contemporary works." He was the conductor of Alpert's performances at the Hollywood Bowl.

Del Barrio arranged the strings on "Who Is It" from Michael Jackson's album Dangerous (1991). He also wrote an arrangement for "Morphine". During the 1990s, del Barrio conducted and arranged strings for Stanley Clarke, and wrote arrangements for Chayanne and Chanté Moore. He conducted and arranged strings for Shelby Lynne's I Am Shelby Lynne (2000) and also arranged strings for her album Identity Crisis (2003). Del Barrio wrote string arrangements for three songs on Toby Keith's album White Trash with Money (2006), including "A Little Too Late".

== Personal life ==
Del Barrio's brothers were musician and composer Eduardo "Eddie" del Barrio and musician, composer and conductor Ramón "Minty" Gutiérrez del Barrio. His sons were dancer and choreographer Raymond del Barrio and composer, arranger and orchestrator George "Gibi" del Barrio.

== Selected discography ==
- Sky Islands – Caldera (1977) – arranger, composer
- Time and Chance – Caldera (1978) – keyboards
- Hell of an Act to Follow – Willie Bobo (1978) – arranger
- Awakening – Narada Michael Walden (1979) – conductor; horn, string and orchestral arrangements
- B.C. – Billy Cobham (1979) – arranger, conductor, orchestration
- Tender Togetherness – Stanley Turrentine (1981) – conductor, string arrangements
- Jeffrey Osborne – Jeffrey Osborne (1982) – string arrangements
- Luz – Djavan (1982) – arranger, conductor
- Powerlight – Earth, Wind & Fire (1983) – keyboards, arrangements
- The Clarke/Duke Project II – Stanley Clarke and George Duke (1983) – string arrangements
- Continuation – Philip Bailey (1983) – string conductor
- Third Generation – Hiroshima (1983) – string arrangements
- Let's Hear It for the Boy – Deniece Williams (1984) – string arrangements
- I've Got the Cure – Stephanie Mills (1984) – conductor, string arrangements
- Truly for You – The Temptations (1984) – string arrangements
- Manilow – Barry Manilow (1985) – string arrangements
- Under a Spanish Moon – Herb Alpert (1988) – composer, arranger, conductor, piano
- Positive – Peabo Bryson (1988) – string arrangements
- One Love – One Dream – Jeffrey Osborne (1988) – conductor
- East – Hiroshima (1989) – arranger, string arrangements
- Dangerous – Michael Jackson (1991) – string arrangement on "Who Is It"
- Provócame – Chayanne (1992) – conductor; horn and string arrangements
- Precious – Chanté Moore (1992) – arranger, string arrangements
- East River Drive – Stanley Clarke (1993) – conductor, string arrangements
- I Am Shelby Lynne – Shelby Lynne (2000) – arranger, conductor, string arrangements
- Identity Crisis – Shelby Lynne (2003) – string arrangements
- White Trash with Money – Toby Keith (2006) – string arrangement on "A Little Too Late"
