= Midnight Sun (Herb Alpert album) =

Studio album by Herb Alpert
- Released: 1992
- Recorded: 1991–1992
- Genre: Easy listening, jazz
- Length: 51:16
- Label: A&M
- Producer: Herb Alpert

Herb Alpert chronology
North on South St. (1991)	Midnight Sun (1992)	Second Wind (1996)

Professional ratings
Review scores
Source	Rating
AllMusic	3/5 stars

Midnight Sun is an album of late-night jazz standards recorded by Herb Alpert. This was Alpert's final release of newly recorded music for A&M Records in 1992. It would also mark the 30th anniversary of A&M Records.

Featured tracks include "Friends" (an original composition featuring a duet with the late Sax legend Stan Getz recorded in 1990), as well as an orchestral arrangement of the hit "A Taste of Honey". Alpert offers two vocal efforts, "Someone to Watch Over Me", and a new version of "I've Grown Accustomed to Her Face". The album closes with "Smile", co-written by Charlie Chaplin, whose legendary lot became the home of the A&M Studios back in 1966.

== Track listing ==
1. "Midnight Sun" (Lionel Hampton, Sonny Burke, Johnny Mercer) - 6:05
2. "All the Things You Are" (Oscar Hammerstein II, Jerome Kern) - 3:53
3. "Someone to Watch Over Me" (George & Ira Gershwin) - 5:16
4. "In the Wee Small Hours" (Bob Hilliard, David Mann) - 5:53
5. "Friends" (Eddie del Barrio, Herb Alpert) - 4:21
6. "A Taste of Honey" (Bobby Scott, Ric Marlow) - 6:52
7. "Mona Lisa" (Jay Livingston, Ray Evans) - 5:46
8. "I've Grown Accustomed to Her Face" (Alan Jay Lerner, Frederick Loewe) - 5:07
9. "Silent Tears and Roses" (Eddie del Barrio) - 3:50
10. "Smile" (Charlie Chaplin, John Turner, Geoffrey Parsons) - 4:13

== Personnel ==
- Herb Alpert – trumpet, vocals
- Frank Collett – grand piano (1–4, 6–10)
- Eddie del Barrio – grand piano (5), arrangements and conductor
- Larry Carlton – guitars (1–4, 6–10)
- John Pisano – guitars
- Barry Zwieg – guitars (1–4, 6–10)
- Monty Budwig – bass
- Harvey Mason – drums (1–4, 6–10)
- Jeff Hamilton – drums (5)
- Stan Getz – tenor saxophone (5)
- Bill Hughes – string contractor

== Production ==
- Herb Alpert – producer
- Steve Smith – engineer
- John Aguto – assistant engineer
- Greg Goldman – assistant engineer
- Ed Goodreau – assistant engineer
- Eric Rudd – assistant engineer
- Thom Russo – assistant engineer
- Bernie Grundman – mastering at Bernie Grundman Mastering (Hollywood, California)
- Roland Young – art direction
- Jürgen Reisch – photography
- Kip Cohen – management, direction
