= Slaves Mass =

Slaves mass

Studio album by Hermeto Pascoal
- Released: 1977
- Genres: Jazz, experimental music, jazz fusion, jazz rock, Baião music, psychedelia
- Length: 42:43
- Label: Warner Bros.
- Producers: Airto Moreira, Flora Purim

Professional ratings
Review scores
Source	Rating
AllMusic	4/5 stars

Slaves Mass is a 1977 album by Brazilian composer and multi-instrumentalist Hermeto Pascoal. Recorded for Warner Bros. Records, the album features some of the most beloved Brazilian musicians of the time.

== Track listing ==
#	Title	Songwriters	Length
1.	"Mixing Pot" ("Tacho")	Hermeto Pascoal	9:18
2.	"Slaves Mass" ("Missa Dos Escravos")	Hermeto Pascoal	4:19
3.	"Little Cry for Him" ("Chorinho Para Ele")	Hermeto Pascoal	2:11
4.	"Cannon (Dedicated To Cannonball Adderley)"	Hermeto Pascoal	5:20
5.	"Just Listen" ("Escuta Meu Piano")	Hermeto Pascoal	7:08
6.	"That Waltz" ("Aquela Valsa")	Hermeto Pascoal	2:46
7.	"Cherry Jam" ("Geléia De Cereja")	Hermeto Pascoal	11:45
	Bonus tracks		
8.	"Open Field" ("Campo Aberto")	Hermeto Pascoal	4:25
9.	"Pica Pau (Take 1)"	Hermeto Pascoal	14:20
10.	"Star Trap (Part 2)"	Hermeto Pascoal	15:45

The bonus tracks were included in 2005, when the album was released on CD.

== Personnel ==
- Hermeto Pascoal: piano, keyboards, clavinet, melodica, soprano sax, flutes, acoustic guitar, twelve strings guitar and vocals (in "Cannon"), live pigs (in "Slaves Mass").
- Flora Purim: vocals (in "Slaves mass" and "Cannon").
- Airto Moreira: drums (all tracks except "Mixing pot", "Pica pau" and "Star trap"), percussion and vocals (in "Cannon").
- Chester Thompson: drums (in "Mixing pot", "Pica pau" and "Star trap").
- Ron Carter: acoustic bass (all tracks except "Mixing pot", "Pica pau" and "Star trap").
- Alphonso Johnson: electric bass (in "Mixing pot", "Pica pau" and "Star trap").
- Raul de Souza: trombone and vocals (in "Cannon")
- David Amaro: electric guitar, acoustic guitar and twelve strings guitar.
- Hugo Fattoruso: vocals (in "Cannon").
- Laudir de Oliveira: vocals (in "Cannon").
