= North on South St. =

Studio album by Herb Alpert
- Released: 1991
- Studio: A&M Studios (Hollywood, California); Soundworks West (Los Angeles, California).
- Genre: R&B
- Length: 44:37
- Label: A&M
- Producer: Herb Alpert, Greg Smith, Robert Jerald, Jimmy B, Troy Staton, Eddie del Barrio, Steve Smith

Herb Alpert chronology
My Abstract Heart (1989)	North on South St. (1991)	Midnight Sun (1992)

Professional ratings
Review scores
Source	Rating
Allmusic	3/5 stars

North on South St. is a hip-hop influenced album by Herb Alpert released in 1991 and his last vinyl release on A&M Records before he released Midnight Sun (available on CD and cassette only) in 1992. The album was a commercial success and produced two singles: "Jump Street" and "North on South St." Both of the singles had a video, yet "North on South St." got a bit of popularity because the video was featured on Beavis and Butt-head several years later. There was a promotional plastic compass that was created as a marketing advertisement piece to commemorate the album release.

== Track listing ==
1. "Jump Street" (Greg Smith, Herb Alpert) - 4:47
2. "It's the Last Dance" (Herb Alpert, Greg Smith) - 4:37
3. "Passion Lady" (Troy Staton, Herb Alpert, Marc Jay Goodman, Mike Schlesinger) - 4:47
4. "North on South St." (Herb Alpert, Greg Smith) - 3:37
5. "Paradise 25" (Robert Jerald, Herb Alpert) - 4:21
6. "Na Na Na" (Greg Smith, Herb Alpert) - 4:16
7. "Funky Reggae" (Jimmy B, Herb Alpert) - 4:51
8. "Where's Tommy?" (Herb Alpert, Jimmy B, Eddie del Barrio) - 4:01
9. "City Terrace" (Herb Alpert, Greg Smith) - 4:11
10. "I Can't Stop Thinking About You" (Herb Alpert) - 5:09

== Critical reception ==
Shelly Weiss of Cashbox praised the album as “the tightest, most finely crafted quality album I've heard all year… across-the-board appeal, and will get the street crowd as well as the yuppies..”

== Personnel ==
- Herb Alpert – all trumpets, voice (4), drum programming (8, 10), keyboards (10)
- Greg Smith – keyboards (1, 10), programming (1, 2, 4, 6, 9), guitars (1), bass (1)
- Joe Rotondi Jr. – acoustic piano (1, 5, 7), acoustic piano solo (3)
- Troy Staton – keyboard programming (3), bass and drum programming (3)
- Marc J. Goodman – additional keyboards (3), interlude solos (3)
- Michael Schlesinger – synthesizer programming (3)
- Robert Jerald – programming (5)
- Eddie del Barrio – keyboards (8, 10), bass (8), strings (10)
- Kenny McCloud – guitars (7), drum programming (10)
- Anthony Sapp – bass (7)
- Jimmy "B" Bakker – drum programming (7)
- Chris Boyd – drum programming (8)
- Steve Smith – drum programming (8)
- Kevin Ricard – percussion (1, 3, 5, 7, 9, 10)
- Brenda Andrews – sampled voice (8)

Voices on "Funky Reggae"

- Jimmy B, Stayce Branché, Karen "K-Dean" Cover, Karime Harris, Michelle James, Janeen Jewett, Vatrena King, Lynette Lewis and Linda Williams

=== Production ===
- Chris Boyd – executive producer
- Herb Alpert – producer
- Greg Smith – producer (1, 2, 4, 6, 9, 10)
- Troy Staton – producer (3)
- Robert Jerald – producer (5)
- Jimmy B – producer (7)
- Eddie del Barrio – producer (8)
- Steve Smith – producer (8), engineer, remixing
- Mike Baumgartner – assistant engineer
- Michael Morongell – remixing, technical advisor
- Tom Hardisty – remix assistant
- Brian Gardner – mastering at Bernie Grundman Mastering (Hollywood, California)
- Chuck Beeson – art direction, design
- Caroline Greyshock – photography
- Kip Cohen – management direction
