= When You Know =

Studio album by Dianne Reeves
- Released: April 15, 2008
- Studio: NRG
- Genre: Vocal jazz; smooth jazz
- Length: 53:14
- Label: Blue Note
- Producer: George Duke

Dianne Reeves chronology
Good Night, and Good Luck (Soundtrack) (2005)	When You Know (2008)	Beautiful Life (2014)

Professional ratings
Review scores
Source	Rating
AllMusic	2.5/5 stars

When You Know is an album by American jazz singer Dianne Reeves. It was released on April 15, 2008, via Blue Note Records.

== Track listing ==
No.	Title	Writer(s)	Length
1.	"Just My Imagination (Running Away with Me)"	Norman Whitfield, Barrett Strong	4:52
2.	"Over the Weekend"	John Benson Brooks, Joseph McCarthy	5:23
3.	"Lovin' You"	Minnie Riperton, Richard Rudolph	5:29
4.	"I'm in Love Again"	Cy Coleman, Peggy Lee, Bill Schluger	4:44
5.	"Midnight Sun"	Sonny Burke, Lionel Hampton, Johnny Mercer	5:43
6.	"Once I Loved"	Antônio Carlos Jobim, Vinícius de Moraes, Ray Gilbert	5:33
7.	"The Windmills of Your Mind"	Alan Bergman, Marilyn Bergman, Michel Legrand	5:15
8.	"Social Call"	Gigi Gryce, Jon Hendricks	4:18
9.	"When You Know"	Jeff Franzel, Tom Kimmel	6:45
10.	"Today Will Be a Good Day"	Dianne Reeves	5:10
Total length:			53:14

== Chart history ==
Chart (2008)	Peak position
US Top Jazz Albums (Billboard)	6
