= Eddie del Barrio =

Argentinian musician (b. 1937)

- Born: Eduardo Gutiérrez del Barrio; Buenos Aires, Argentina
- Genres: Jazz, Latin jazz, classical.
- Occupations: Musician, composer, arranger
- Instruments: Piano, keyboards
- Years active: 1955–present
- Label: A&M
- Formerly of: Caldera

Eduardo Gutiérrez del Barrio, known professionally as Eddie del Barrio, is an Argentinian composer, arranger, songwriter, and pianist. He is a founding member of the jazz fusion band Caldera. He has collaborated with Earth, Wind & Fire, Stan Getz, Herb Alpert, and Dianne Reeves.

== Early life ==
Eduardo del Barrio was born in Buenos Aires, Argentina, in 1937. In 1942 his family moved to Mendoza, where his father started a music school. Del Barrio is a classically trained pianist. At seventeen he led a jazz band, playing in clubs. In 1965 he moved to the United States. His brother Jorge del Barrio was classically trained and moved to Los Angeles, where he worked as an arranger.

== Career ==
Eduardo del Barrio and Jorge Strunz of Costa Rica were the founding members of Caldera, a jazz fusion group. Caldera was composed of Del Barrio on keyboards, Strunz on guitar, Dean Cortez on bass and Steve Tavaglione on saxophone, Cuban drummer Carlos Vega, and Brazilian percussionist Mike Azevedo.

In 1976 Capitol Records signed the band and released the debut album Caldera. Del Barrio co-produced the albums Sky Islands, Time and Chance, and Dreamer. Larry Dunn of Earth, Wind & Fire, co-produced Sky Islands. Caldera's song "Out of the Blue" reached position 95 on the Billboard Hot Soul Singles chart on January 22, 1977. "Time and Chance" reached position 46 on the Billboard Best Selling Jazz LPs chart in October 1978. "Ancient Source" was sampled by American rapper Joey Badass on his song "95 Til' Infinity".

Del Barrio composed "Fantasy", "Runnin' ", "Star", "Sailaway", "Sparkle", "Straight from the Heart" and "Miracles" for Earth, Wind & Fire. "Runnin'" was re-recorded by American jazz musician Marcus Miller with additional music and lyrics under the title "Keep 'Em Runnin". "Fantasy" received a nomination for Grammy Award for Best R&B Song. "Runnin" won a Grammy award for Best R&B Instrumental Performance.

Del Barrio collaborated with Dianne Reeves during the recording sessions for Caldera's album Sky Islands when she sang on the song "Ancient Source". Reeves sang a version of "Ancient Source" on her album The Nearness of You. Del Barrio was a composer on her albums Dianne Reeves and Bridges and produced her album Art and Survival.

During 2005, the Los Angeles Philharmonic commissioned Del Barrio to compose a symphonic jazz mass. "Misa Justa" was written for an orchestra, large choir, five jazz soloists, bass, and drums. Dianne Reeves, Billy Childs, Hubert Laws, Pal McCandless and Terence Blanchard made guest appearances at the concert, which premiered at the Walt Disney Concert Hall.

Del Barrio began his collaboration with Herb Alpert by composing four songs for his 1988 album Under a Spanish Moon. He composed and played on Alpert's North on South St. and worked as an orchestrator on Alpert's album Midnight Sun. Del Barrio then arranged, orchestrated, and played keyboards on Alpert's album Steppin' Out.Steppin' Out won the Grammy Award for Best Pop Instrumental Album in 2013. Herb Alpert signed Del Barrio to A&M, where he recorded his album Free Play.

Del Barrio worked as a composer, orchestrator, and keyboard player on Stan Getz's album Apasionado. The album received a Grammy Award nomination for Best Jazz Fusion Performance.

== Awards and honors ==
- Grammy Award nomination, Best R&B Song, "Fantasy" by Earth, Wind & Fire, 1978

== Discography ==
- Free Play (A&M, 1991)
