= Art & Survival =

Studio album by Dianne Reeves
- Released: 1994
- Genre: Vocal jazz
- Label: EMI
- Producer: Eddie del Barrio, Terri Lyne Carrington

Dianne Reeves chronology
I Remember (1991)	Art & Survival (1994)	Quiet After the Storm (1994)

Art & Survival is an album by the American vocal jazz singer Dianne Reeves, released in 1994.

The album peaked at No. 19 on the Billboard Jazz Albums chart. It has sold more than 500,000 copies. Sheryl Lee Ralph sang part of "Endangered Species" during her 2022 Emmy Awards acceptance speech.

== Production ==
The album was produced by Eddie del Barrio and Terri Lyne Carrington. Reeves cowrote more than half the songs on Art & Survival. Due to industry and personal issues, she went into the recording studio knowing that Art & Survival could be her final album.

== Critical reception ==
Professional ratings
Review scores
Source	Rating
AllMusic	3/5 stars
Robert Christgau	(dud)
The Encyclopedia of Popular Music	3/5 stars
The Indianapolis Star	3.5/4 stars
Los Angeles Times	3/4 stars
MusicHound R&B: The Essential Album Guide	3.5/5 stars
USA Today	3/4 stars

The Los Angeles Times thought that "this multitextured experiment, with its frequent spiritual-based stories, is Reeves' most ambitious effort." The Washington Post wrote: "By far her most personal and soul-searching recording, the album seems as much therapy as a musical expression for the gifted singer." The Philadelphia Daily News said that, "in an incantational style sometimes reminiscent of Leon Thomas and Roberta Flack, the singer/composer evokes ancient spirits and the freeing powers of the Lord, explaining how she's come through the wringer a changed woman."

Newsday deemed the album "a song cycle about self-discovery." Essence called it an "album of powerfully rendered, personal yet universal compositions that run the rhythmic gamut from hard-swinging jazz to plaintive ballads to a cappella African chants." USA Today wrote that "Body and Soul" is "a scat-driven, Afro-Cuban tour de force."

AllMusic considered the album "neither '90s revisited bop nor overtly commercial Quiet Storm fodder ... [Reeves] is really seeking a middle ground between her two audiences."

== Track listing ==
No.	Title	Length
1.	"Old Souls"	5:20
2.	"Come to the River"	5:36
3.	"One More Time"	5:37
4.	"Anthem"	5:26
5.	"Freedom Dance"	6:55
6.	"Endangered Species"	3:23
7.	"Josa Lee"	6:54
8.	"Body and Soul"	10:06
9.	"Silent Tears and Roses"	6:49
10.	"Lament for a Lonely Child"	6:48
11.	"Bird Alone"	6:46
