= A Little Moonlight =

Studio album by Dianne Reeves
- Released: August 19, 2003
- Recorded: December 4–10, 2002
- Genre: Vocal jazz
- Label: Blue Note
- Producer: Arif Mardin

Dianne Reeves chronology
The Calling: Celebrating Sarah Vaughan (2001)	A Little Moonlight (2003)	Christmas Time Is Here (2004)

Professional ratings
Review scores
Source	Rating
Allmusic	link

A Little Moonlight is an album by Dianne Reeves released in 2003.

A Little Moonlight won Reeves her third consecutive Grammy Award for Best Jazz Vocal Album.

== Track listing ==
1. "Loads of Love" (Richard Rodgers) – 4:24
2. "I Concentrate on You" (Cole Porter) – 5:20
3. "Reflections" (Jon Hendricks, Blue Mink, Thelonious Monk) – 5:12
4. "Skylark" (Hoagy Carmichael, Johnny Mercer) – 6:52
5. "What a Little Moonlight Can Do" (Harry M. Woods) – 6:21
6. "Darn That Dream" (Eddie DeLange, Jimmy Van Heusen) – 4:46
7. "I'm All Smiles" (Herbert Martin, Michael Leonard) – 5:58
8. "Lullaby of Broadway" (Al Dubin, Harry Warren) – 5:35
9. "You Go to My Head" (J. Fred Coots, Haven Gillespie) – 7:25
10. "We'll Be Together Again" (Carl T. Fischer, Frankie Laine) – 4:35
11. "Make Sure You're Sure" (Stevie Wonder) – 6:23 [Japanese bonus track]

== Personnel ==
- Dianne Reeves – vocals
- Romero Lubambo – guitar, arranger
- Reuben Rogers – bass
- Gregory Hutchinson – drums
- Peter Martin – piano, arranger
- Nicholas Payton – trumpet (track 9)
- Billy Childs Trio – arranger

Technical

- Arif Mardin – producer
- Ted Jensen – mastering
- Michael O'Reilly – engineer
