= Never Too Far (album) =

Studio album by Dianne Reeves
- Released: 1989
- Studio: Ocean Way Recording (Los Angeles, CA); Le Gonks West (Hollywood, CA)
- Genre: Contemporary jazz
- Length: 47:35
- Label: EMI
- Producer: George Duke

Dianne Reeves chronology
The Nearness of You (1988)	Never Too Far (1989)	I Remember (1991)

Singles from Never Too Far
- 1. "Never Too Far" Released: 1989; 2. "Come In" Released: 1990; 3. "More to Love" Released: 1990

Never Too Far is a studio album by American jazz singer Dianne Reeves issued in 1989 on EMI Records. The album peaked at number one on the US Billboard Contemporary Jazz Albums chart and No. 14 on the US Billboard Top R&B Albums chart.

== Overview ==
Never Too Far was produced by George Duke. The album spent two weeks atop the Billboard Contemporary Jazz Albums chart. Never Too Far was recorded at Ocean Way Recording and Le Gonks West in Los Angeles, California.

== Singles ==
"Never Too Far" and "Come In" reached Nos. 5 and 34 on the Billboard Hot R&B Singles chart, respectively.

== Critical reception ==
Professional ratings
Review scores
Source	Rating
AllMusic	4/5 stars

Johnathan Widran of AllMusic wrote, "Helped along by the marvelous texturing skills of producer George Duke and the rhythms of such jazz heavies as Kirk Whalum, Luis Conte, Abe Laboriel, and Stanley Clarke, Reeves shows a grand affinity for a wide range of stylings... Never Too Far may be classified as an R&B album, but Reeves has the voice and soul of a true jazz diva."

== Track listing ==
No.	Title	Writer(s)	Length
1.	"Hello (Haven't I Seen You Before)"	Mark Kibble; Claude V. McKnight III; Mervyn Warren	3:41
2.	"Never Too Far"	Diane Louie	5:19
3.	"Come In"	Dianne Reeves; Billy Childs; Louie	6:56
4.	"How Long"	Reeves; Louie; George Duke	5:05
5.	"Eyes on the Prize"	Reeves; Duke	4:34
6.	"Bring Me Joy"	Reeves; Luis Conte	1:25
7.	"Fumilayo"	Reeves; Duke	5:27
8.	"More to Love"	Reeves; Louie; Duke	4:07
9.	"We Belong Together"	Reeves; Louie	5:33
10.	"Company"	Alfred Johnson; Rickie Lee Jones	5:28
Total length:			47:35

== Charts ==
Chart (1990)	Peak position
US Billboard 200	81
US Top Contemporary Jazz Albums (Billboard)	1
US Top R&B/Hip-Hop Albums (Billboard)	14
