= In the Moment – Live in Concert =

In the Moment: Live in Concert

Live album by Dianne Reeves
- Released: July 4, 2000
- Recorded: January 20–21, 2000
- Venue: Studio Instrument Rentals Sound Stage 1 (Los Angeles, California)
- Genre: Vocal jazz
- Length: 1:13:51
- Label: Blue Note
- Producer: George Duke

Dianne Reeves chronology
Bridges (1999)	In the Moment: Live in Concert (2000)	The Calling: Celebrating Sarah Vaughan (2001)

In the Moment: Live in Concert is a live album by American singer Dianne Reeves released in 2000 on Blue Note Records. This album peaked at No. 14 on the US Billboard Top Jazz Albums chart and No. 4 on the US Billboard Traditional Jazz Albums chart.

== Background ==
Produced by George Duke, this album was recorded on January 20 and 21, 2000, at Studio Instrument Rentals Sound Stage 1, Los Angeles, California.

== Critical reception ==
Professional ratings
Review scores
Source	Rating
AllMusic	4/5 stars
The Star-Ledger	4/5 stars
Orange County Register	(A−)

George Kanzler of The Star-Ledger claimed "Reeves has been criticized for lack of focus (mostly by those who are disappointed she doesn't just follow in Ella and Sarah's footsteps), but in a live context her restless stylistic leaps come off as sheer exuberance. She brings African vocalizing to "Afro-Blue," sing-tells stories of her life and grandmother, and even does Leonard Cohen's "Suzanne."

Richard S. Ginell of AllMusic found "Reeves is in commanding, assured voice throughout the session, roaming from genre to genre without a hint of unease. There is a lot of autobiography here ("The First Five Chapters," "The Best Times"), where Reeves sounds as if she is making the stories up on the spot; she isn't, but the illusion of spontaneity is convincing if you play along with her...Make no mistake, this is a very good recording, but it had the ingredients to be a great one."

Steve Eddy of the Orange County Register praised the album saying, "Instead of standing on stage and performing a few hits, Reeves took chances here, and the audience seemed totally in sync with what she was up to. The disc succeeds in conveying the flavor of a live show, and the recording quality is superb."

== Accolades ==
With In the Moment, Reeves copped her first ever Grammy Award in the category of Best Jazz Vocal Album.

== Track listing ==
No.	Title	Length
1.	"Morning Has Broken"	9:20
2.	"Afro Blue"	5:48
3.	"The First Five Chapters"	7:16
4.	"Triste"	4:40
5.	"Bridges"	5:35
6.	"Love for Sale"	7:31
7.	"Come In"	7:44
8.	"The Best Times (Grandma's Song)"	8:38
9.	"Testify"	5:56
10.	"Suzanne"	5:24
11.	"Mista"	5:59
Total length:		1:13:51

== Personnel ==
- Dianne Reeves – lead vocals
- Otmaro Ruiz – piano, synthesizer, background vocals
- George Duke – additional keyboards, background vocals, producer, piano (track 4)
- Romero Lubambo – guitar
- Reginald Veal – bass, background vocals
- Rocky Bryant – drums, background vocals
- Munyungo Jackson – percussion, background vocals
- Wayne Holmes – additional background vocals, engineering
- Erik Zobler – engineering

== Charts ==
Chart (2000)	Peak position
US Top Jazz Albums (Billboard)	14
US Traditional Jazz Albums (Billboard)	4
