= The Calling: Celebrating Sarah Vaughan =

2001 studio album by Dianne Reeves

Studio album by Dianne Reeves
- Released: February 13, 2001
- Recorded: September 9–11, 2000
- Genre: Vocal jazz
- Length: 1:05:23
- Label: Blue Note
- Producer: George Duke

Dianne Reeves chronology
In the Moment – Live in Concert (2000)	The Calling: Celebrating Sarah Vaughan (2001)	The Best of Dianne Reeves (2002)

The Calling: Celebrating Sarah Vaughan is a 2001 tribute album to Sarah Vaughan by Dianne Reeves, released in 2001 on Blue Note Records. This album peaked at No. 8 on the US Billboard Top Jazz Albums chart and No. 6 on the US Billboard Traditional Jazz Albums chart.

== Influence ==
In the liner notes, Reeves wrote: "Making this CD is the fulfillment of a dream born when I first heard Sarah Vaughan as a teenager. The dream continued to grow as I marveled at her magical touch with lyrics, melodies, harmonies and timbre. ... She fearlessly explored unfamiliar areas in the realm of vocal musical expression, reaching, ascending, grasping and possessing. Sarah was never content to luxuriate in her past laurels, but her musical appetite propelled her forward throughout her career. She never deserted her calling." Reeves also mentions that her first Vaughan album was Sarah Vaughan with Michel Legrand (1972) and tells of how she met Vaughan at a 1975 tribute concert for Cannonball Adderley. She told a woman she was speaking with that she loved Vaughan, not realizing that the woman was Vaughan herself.

== Critical reception ==
Professional ratings
Review scores
Source	Rating
AllMusic	2.5/5 stars
Los Angeles Times	3/5 stars
USA Today	3.5/4 stars

Steve Jones of USA Today declared, "Reeves, with her lively scatting and multi-octave voice, never tries imitating the great singer. She provides a fresh take on each song, luxuriating in the music provided by such musicians as George Duke, Billy Childs, Reginald Veal, Russell Malone and Clark Terry, in addition to a 42-piece orchestra."

Geoff Chapman of the Toronto Star praised the album, saying, "Here, with a core jazz foursome and a sometimes intrusive 42-piece orchestra, she's in vibrant voice tackling pieces associated with the divine Sarah. Their range and tones are similar, chocolate-dense, dark and sweet with ever-present natural elegance and Reeves takes full advantage on 11 pieces- even making "Send In The Clowns" palatable.

Don Heckman of the Los Angeles Times wrote, "There are times in the album when Reeves largely sets aside her own style, choosing instead to emulate both the timbre and the sweeping vocalisms associated with Vaughan. And, to her credit, she does it extremely well. But the subtext of the music has another reference point--the Miles Davis collaborations with arranger Gil Evans. That is provided by composer-pianist Billy Childs, who has delivered a series of lush orchestral wrappings that reach beyond accompaniment and into symbiotic musical partnership. It doesn't always work perfectly, but when it does, the resulting performances are stunning examples of what can happen when talented artists set aside their egos in pursuit of a common creative goal."

Jim Santella of All About Jazz wrote, "With a full string orchestra on every track, Reeves unleashes a program of stirring musical arrangements. Billy Childs, a bright guy with forward-leaning ideas, created most of these unique arrangements. The harmony and rhythm is a far cry from average. Reeves is at home with these arrangements, but you get the impression she's holding back. The drama of two Brazilian pieces brings out her emotional strengths most effectively. Dori Caymmi's 'Obsession' and Milton Nascimento's 'The Call' feature wordless chanting with a powerful hook."

Bret Saunders of The Denver Post also placed The Calling: Celebrating Sarah Vaughan among his list of 2001's top 10 jazz albums.

Ted Gioia later selected two of Reeves covers from this album, "Fascinating Rhythm" and "If You Could See Me Now," as "Recommended Versions" of these songs in his book The Jazz Standards.

== Accolades ==
The Calling: Celebrating Sarah Vaughan won Reeves her second Grammy, in the category of Best Jazz Vocal Album.

== Track listing ==
1. "Lullaby of Birdland" (George Shearing, George David Weiss) - 4:44
2. "Send in the Clowns (Stephen Sondheim) - 6:03
3. "Speak Low" (Ogden Nash, Kurt Weill) - 6:26
4. "Obsession" (Tracy Mann, Danilo Caymmi, Gilson Peranzzetta) - 7:37
5. "If You Could See Me Now" (Tadd Dameron, Carl Sigman) - 6:44
6. "I Remember Sarah" (Billy Childs, Dianne Reeves) - 4:20
7. "Key Largo" (Benny Carter, Karl Suessdorf, Leah Worth) - 4:11
8. "I Hadn't Anyone Till You" (Ray Noble) - 5:41
9. "Fascinating Rhythm" (George Gershwin, Ira Gershwin) - 5:24
10. "Embraceable You" (G. Gershwin, I. Gershwin) - 7:56
11. "A Chamada (The Call)" (Milton Nascimento) - 6:17

=== Japanese bonus track ===
12. "Misty" (Erroll Garner, Johnny Burke)

== Personnel ==
- Dianne Reeves – vocals
- Clark Terry - trumpet (track 8)
- Steve Wilson - soprano & alto saxophones (tracks 2, 4, 7)
- Mulgrew Miller - piano (tracks 1,3, 5-8, 12)
- Billy Childs - piano (tracks 2, 4, 9)
- Romero Lubambo - acoustic guitar (tracks 3, 4, 7, 11)
- Russell Malone - acoustic guitar (track 10)
- Reginald Veal - acoustic & electric bass (track 9)
- Greg Hutchinson - drums
- Munyungo Jackson - percussion (tracks 3, 4, 7. 9, 11)
- Billy Childs, Patrick Gandy - conductor and arranger
- George Duke - producer
