= Dianne Reeves (album) =

Studio album by Dianne Reeves
- Released: August 25, 1987
- Studio: Mama Jo's (North Hollywood, California); Le Gonks West (Hollywood, California)
- Genre: Contemporary jazz
- Length: 43:33
- Label: Blue Note
- Producer: George Duke

Dianne Reeves chronology
| For Every Heart (1984) | Dianne Reeves (1987) | The Nearness of You (1988) |

Singles from Dianne Reeves
- 1. "Better Days" Released: 1988; 2. "Never Said (Chan's Song)" Released: 1988

Professional ratings
Review scores
| Source | Rating |
|---|---|
| New Musical Express | 8/10 |

Dianne Reeves is the second album by American jazz singer Dianne Reeves, issued in the United States on August 25, 1987, through Blue Note Records. The album peaked at number one on the Billboard Contemporary Jazz Albums chart and number 28 on the Billboard Soul Albums chart in early 1988.

The album was produced by George Duke and recorded at Mama Jo's and Le Gonks West in Hollywood, California.

== Track listing ==
| No. | Title | Writer(s) | Length |
|---|---|---|---|
| 1. | "Sky Islands" | Dianne Reeves; Larry Dunn | 4:43 |
| 2. | "I'm O.K." | Eduardo Del Barrio | 5:16 |
| 3. | "Better Days" | Dianne Reeves; Tony Lorrich | 5:31 |
| 4. | "Harvest Time" | Herbie Hancock; Jean Hancock | 5:38 |
| 5. | "Chan's Song (Never Said)" | Herbie Hancock; Stevie Wonder | 5:34 |
| 6. | "Yesterdays" | Jerome Kern; Otto Harbach | 5:02 |
| 7. | "I've Got It Bad and That Ain't Good" | Duke Ellington; Paul Francis Webster | 7:31 |
| 8. | "That's All" | Alan Brandt; Bob Haymes | 4:13 |
| Total length: | | | 43:33 |

== Personnel ==
- Dianne Reeves – vocals
- George Duke – Synclavier synthesizer (tracks: 1–3), Yamaha TX816 (tracks: 1, 3), piano (track 7), producer
- Billy Childs – piano (tracks: 2, 6, 8)
- Herbie Hancock – keyboards (tracks: 4, 5)
- Jorge del Barrio – Synclavier strings (tracks: 4, 5)
- Paul Jackson – guitar (tracks: 1, 3–5)
- Freddie Washington – bass (tracks: 1, 3–5)
- Tony Dumas – bass (tracks: 2, 8)
- Stanley Clarke – bass (tracks: 6, 7)
- Ricky Lawson – drums (tracks: 1, 3)
- Ralph Penland – drums (tracks: 2, 8)
- Leon "Ndugu" Chancler – drums (tracks: 4, 5)
- Tony Williams – drums (tracks: 6, 7)
- Paulinho da Costa – percussion (tracks: 1, 3–5)
- Airto Moreira – percussion (track 6)
- Justo Almario – tenor saxophone (track 4)
- Freddie Hubbard – flugelhorn (tracks: 6, 7)
- Erik Zobler – engineering
- Alice Murreli – production assistant
- Steve Ford – assistant engineering (tracks: 1–5, 8)
- Mitch Gibson – assistant engineering (tracks: 1, 3–7)

== Charts ==
| Chart (1988) | Peak position |
|---|---|
| US Billboard 200 | 172 |
| US Top R&B/Hip-Hop Albums (Billboard) | 28 |
| US Top Contemporary Jazz Albums (Billboard) | 1 |
