= Steve Tavaglione =

- Also known as: "Tav"
- Born: December 1, 1950 (age 74); Riverside, California, US
- Genres: Jazz fusion, jazz, Latin jazz, classical
- Instrument(s): Woodwind, EWI
- Years active: 1955–present
- Labels: A&M
- Member of: Caldera

Steve "Tav" Tavaglione (born December 1, 1950) is an American woodwind and EWI musician. He is best known for his work as a co-founder of the Latin fusion group Caldera with Jorge Strunz and Eduardo del Barrio, his work with Michael Jackson, Whitney Houston, John Pisano, Scott Kinsey, Diana Ross, George Benson, Lee Ritenour, John Beasley, and his appearances on television and film soundtracks notably film composers Thomas Newman and Mark Isham.

== Early life ==
Tavaglione was born December 1, 1950, in Riverside, California, where he was raised. He learned to play saxophone on his own and sat in with a jazz trio that played at his uncle's bowling alley.

== Career ==
His first professional appearance was performing with Sly and the Family Stone at the first Annual American Music Awards.

=== Caldera ===
Tavaglione was a member of the band Caldera, composed of Eddie del Barrio on keyboards, Jorge Strunz on guitar, Dean Cortez on bass, Cuban drummer Carlos Vega, Brazilian percussionist Mike Azevedo, with Tavaglione on saxophone.

Capitol Records signed the band in 1976 and released four albums, with Caldera as the debut album. Caldera's song "Out of the Blue" reached position 95 on the Billboard Hot Soul Singles chart on January 22, 1977.

"Time and Chance" reached position 46 on the Billboard Best Selling Jazz LPs chart in October 1978.

=== Karizma ===
Tavaglione was a member of the band Karizma in various line ups, with David Garfield as leader.

=== Solo career ===
Tavaglione appears as a studio musician on artist recordings including David Crosby, Mark Isham, John Pisano, John Patitucci, John Beasley, Holly Cole, Dave Weckl, television programs including CSI, CSI: NY and Charmed, and films including Bridge of Spies, Alpha Dog, Wall-e, Finding Nemo, Road to Perdition, American Beauty.

He has appeared as an instrumental soloist on film soundtracks for the scores of Thomas Newman, including The Help and Saving Mr. Banks.

== Discography ==
- Blue Tav (1990)
- Silent Singing (1997)
