= Beautiful Life (Dianne Reeves album) =

Studio album by Dianne Reeves
- Released: February 11, 2013
- Genre: Vocal jazz
- Length: 68:41
- Label: Concord
- Producer: Terri Lyne Carrington

Dianne Reeves chronology
When You Know (2008)	Beautiful Life (2013)

Beautiful Life is a studio album by American jazz singer Dianne Reeves, released in 2013 by Concord label. The album peaked at No. 3 on the US Billboard Top Jazz Albums chart and No. 1 on the US Billboard Top Contemporary Jazz Albums chart. Beautiful Life won a Grammy Award in the category of Best Jazz Vocal Album.

== Critical reception ==
Professional ratings
Review scores
Source	Rating
AllMusic	4/5 stars

Christopher Loudon of JazzTimes stated: "The half-decade absence has done nothing to diminish the power or glory of Reeves’ voice on record. Though she's long been touted as an heir to Ella or Sarah, here she adopts a smoother, more soulful sound that's closer in spirit to Anita Baker... Rounding out the playlist are five originals written or co-written by Reeves. All are good; two–the post-breakup anthem 'Cold' and the fiery 'Tango'–are exceptional."

Thom Jurek of AllMusic said, "Beautiful Life is Reeves' finest record to date. It not only blurs genre lines but erases them. The result is glorious, accessible R&B drenched contemporary jazz that is as sophisticated as it is honest."

== Recording ==
The main recording location was Kaleidoscope Sound, Union City, NJ, with additional sessions at Highend Studio, New York, NY; Rocky Mountain Recorders, Denver, CO; Wellspring Sound, Acton, MA; Bobby Sparks Enterprises, Mesquite, TX.

== Track listing ==
No.	Title	Writer(s)	Length
1.	"I Want You"	Arthur Ross, Leon Ware	4:57
2.	"Feels So Good (Lifted)"	Terri Lyne Carrington, Dianne Reeves, Nadia Washington	4:25
3.	"Dreams"	Stevie Nicks	5:19
4.	"Satiated (Been Waiting)"	Terri Lyne Carrington	5:38
5.	"Waiting in Vain"	Bob Marley	6:35
6.	"32 Flavors"	Ani DiFranco	5:26
7.	"Cold"	Terreon Gully, Peter Martin, Dianne Reeves	6:13
8.	"Wild Rose"	Esperanza Spalding	5:50
9.	"Stormy Weather"	Harold Arlen, Ted Koehler	8:02
10.	"Tango"	Dianne Reeves	6:35
11.	"Unconditional Love (for You)"	Geri Allen, Dianne Reeves	5:42
12.	"Long Road Ahead"	Peter Martin, Dianne Reeves, Peter Sprague	3:59
Total length:			68:41
