= Caldera (Caldera album) =

Studio album by Caldera
- Released: 1976; 1992 (re-release)
- Recorded: December 1975 – January 1976
- Studio: Hollywood Sound
- Genre: Jazz fusion, jazz rock, latin jazz
- Length: 38:42
- Label: Capitol
- Producer: Wayne Henderson

Caldera chronology
Caldera (1976)	Sky Islands (1977)

Caldera is the debut album by the jazz fusion band Caldera that was released in 1976 by Capitol Records. The album reached No. 33 on the Cashbox Top 40 Jazz Albums chart.

== Critical reception ==
Professional ratings
Review scores
Source	Rating
AllMusic	3.5/5 stars

Alex Henderson of AllMusic, where it received a 3.5 out of 5 star rating, wrote "With Wayne Henderson of Crusaders fame handling the production, Caldera showed a great deal of promise on its self-titled 1976 debut album. The Latin jazz-fusion unit isn't afraid to take chances on such imaginative pieces as Jorge Strunz's "El Juguete" and Eduardo del Barrio's "Exaltation"—chances that pay off in a major way. Though one can tell that Caldera's members were well aware of such explorers as Return to Forever, Weather Report, and the Mahavishnu Orchestra, it's also clear that they were major Earth, Wind & Fire fans and had absorbed a wide variety of Latin music. Strunz and del Barrio were hardly the only fusionists who incorporated Latin rhythms in the 1970s -- Chick Corea, George Duke, Wayne Shorter, Al Di Meola, and Joe Zawinul were all well aware of the musical innovations of Latinos, but Caldera was unique in the sense that the band represented a real melting pot of Latinos bringing different ideas to the table. And on this LP, those ideas work magnificently."

== Track listing ==
No.	Title	Writer(s)	Length
1.	"Guanacaste"	Jorge Strunz, Eduardo del Barrio	6:31
2.	"Exaltation"	Eduardo del Barrio	6:52
3.	"Synesthesia"	Jorge Strunz	7:45
4.	"Out of the Blue"	Jorge Strunz, Eduardo del Barrio	4:46
5.	"El Juguete"	Jorge Strunz, H.Hamburg	8:31

== Personnel ==
- Jorge Strunz — acoustic guitar, electric guitar, percussion
- Eduardo del Barrio — acoustic piano, electric piano, synthesizers, percussion, clavinet, vocals
- Steve Tavaglione — soprano saxophone, flute, bass, alto flute
- Mike Azeredo — congas, percussion
- Carlos Vega — drums, percussion
- Dean Cortez — electric bass
- Raul De Souza — bass trombone, trombone
- Roberto da Silva — percussion
- Carolyn Dennis — vocals
