= Caldera (band) =

Former American jazz fusion band

- Origin: New York City
- Genres: Jazz fusion, latin rock, progressive rock
- Years active: 1976–1979
- Label: Capitol/EMI
- Past members: Eduardo del Barrio; Jorge Strunz; Steve Tavaglione; Carlos Vega; Mike "Baiano" Azevedo

Caldera was an American band that combined jazz, funk, and rock with Latin music. Return to Forever and Weather Report influenced Caldera, but its members were also influenced by soul, Afro-cuban, salsa, samba, and Peruvian music.

== Biography ==
Members of Caldera, which was led by keyboardist Eduardo del Barrio and guitarist Jorge Strunz (Strunz & Farah), came from all over Latin America as well as parts of the United States. While bass player Greg Lee and saxophonist Steve Tavaglione were US born, other members were born in Costa Rica (Strunz), Argentina (Del Barrio), Cuba (drummer Carlos Vega), and Brazil (percussionist Mike "Baiano" Azevedo).

In 1976, Caldera signed with Capitol and recorded its self-titled debut album, which was followed by Sky Islands in 1977, Time and Chance in 1978, and Dreamer in 1979. Larry Dunn of Earth, Wind & Fire co-produced Sky Islands. Caldera's song "Out of the Blue" reached No. 95 on the Billboard Hot Soul Singles chart in January 1977. Time and Chance reached No. 46 on the Billboard Best Selling Jazz LPs chart in October 1978. "Ancient Source" was sampled by American rapper Joey Badass on his song "95 Til Infinity". "Ancient Source" was also sampled by Rick Ross on his 2010 effort Teflon Don for the song "Maybach Music 3" featuring T.I., Jadakiss, and Erykah Badu. All but the band’s third album were reissued on CD.

The band separated in 1979. However, most of Caldera's members kept busy long after its breakup. Strunz went on to form the guitar duo Strunz & Farah with Iranian/Persian guitarist Ardeshir Farah, while Del Barrio worked with artists such as Earth, Wind & Fire, Stan Getz and Dianne Reeves throughout the 1980s and 1990s.

== Discography ==
- Caldera (1976)
- Sky Islands (1977)
- Time and Chance (1978)
- Dreamer (1979)
