= Dianne Reeves =

American jazz singer (born 1956)

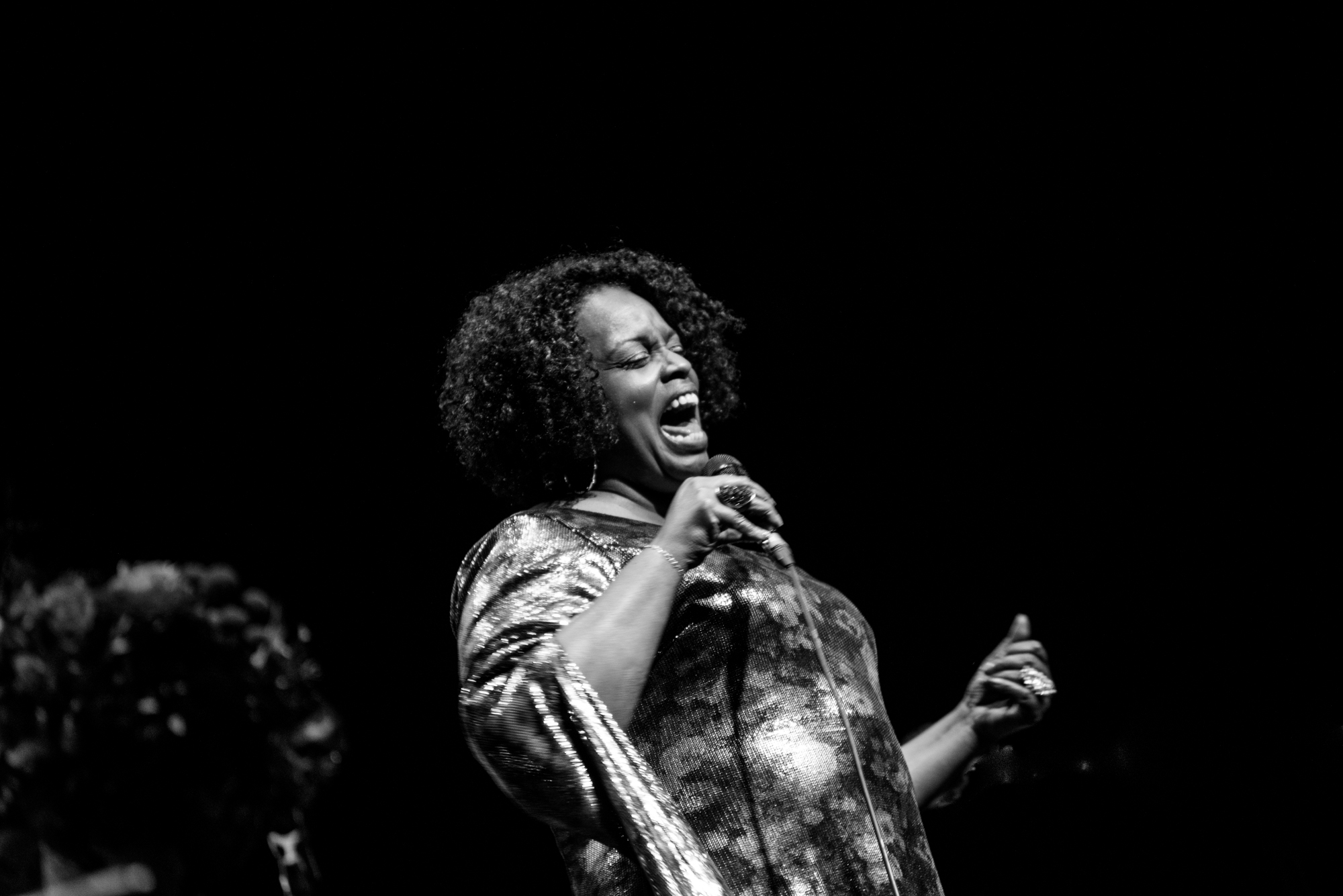

Background information
- Born: Dianne Elizabeth Reeves; October 23, 1956 (age 69); Detroit, Michigan, U.S.
- Genres: Jazz
- Occupation: Musician
- Instrument: Vocals
- Years active: 1976–present
- Labels: Blue Note; Concord
- Website: www.diannereeves.com
- Relatives: Charles Burrell (uncle); George Duke (cousin)

Dianne Elizabeth Reeves (born October 23, 1956) is an American jazz singer. Reeves has won five Grammy awards from a total nine nominations.

== Early life and education ==
Dianne Reeves was born in Detroit, Michigan, United States, into a musical family. Her father sang, her mother played trumpet, her uncle is bassist Charles Burrell, and her cousin was George Duke. Her father died when she was two years old, and she was raised in Denver, Colorado, by her mother, Vada Swanson, and maternal family. Reeves was raised Catholic and attended Cure D'Ars Catholic School in Denver for much of her early schooling.

== Career ==
In 1971, Reeves started singing and playing piano. She was a member of her high-school band and while performing at a convention in Chicago was noticed by trumpeter Clark Terry, who invited her to sing with him. "He had these amazing all-star bands, but I had no idea who they all were! The thing I loved about it was the way they interacted with each other – the kind of intimate exchange that I wasn't part of. For a young singer, it was fertile soil." She studied classical voice at the University of Colorado.

Reeves moved to Los Angeles, where she sang and recorded with Stanley Turrentine, Lenny White, and Billy Childs. She recorded with the band Caldera, then founded the band Night Flight with Billy Childs, with whom she would collaborate again in the 1990s. She moved to New York City and from 1983 to 1986 toured with Harry Belafonte.

She signed with Blue Note in 1987 and that year her eponymous album, featuring Herbie Hancock, Freddie Hubbard, and Tony Williams, was nominated for a Grammy Award. She went on to win five Grammy Awards.

Music critic Scott Yanow has said of her: "A logical successor to Dinah Washington and Carmen McRae, Reeves is a superior interpreter of lyrics and a skilled scat singer." Her sound has been compared to that of Patti Austin, Vanessa Rubin, Anita Baker, and Regina Belle.

Reeves performed at the closing ceremony of the 2002 Winter Olympics in Salt Lake City. In 2005, she appeared in the film Good Night, and Good Luck singing 1950s standards (including "How High the Moon", "I've Got My Eyes on You", "Too Close for Comfort", "Straighten Up and Fly Right" and "One for My Baby"). In 2006, the soundtrack won the Grammy Award for Best Jazz Vocal Album.

Reeves appeared in the 2021 documentary film JazzTown.

== Discography ==
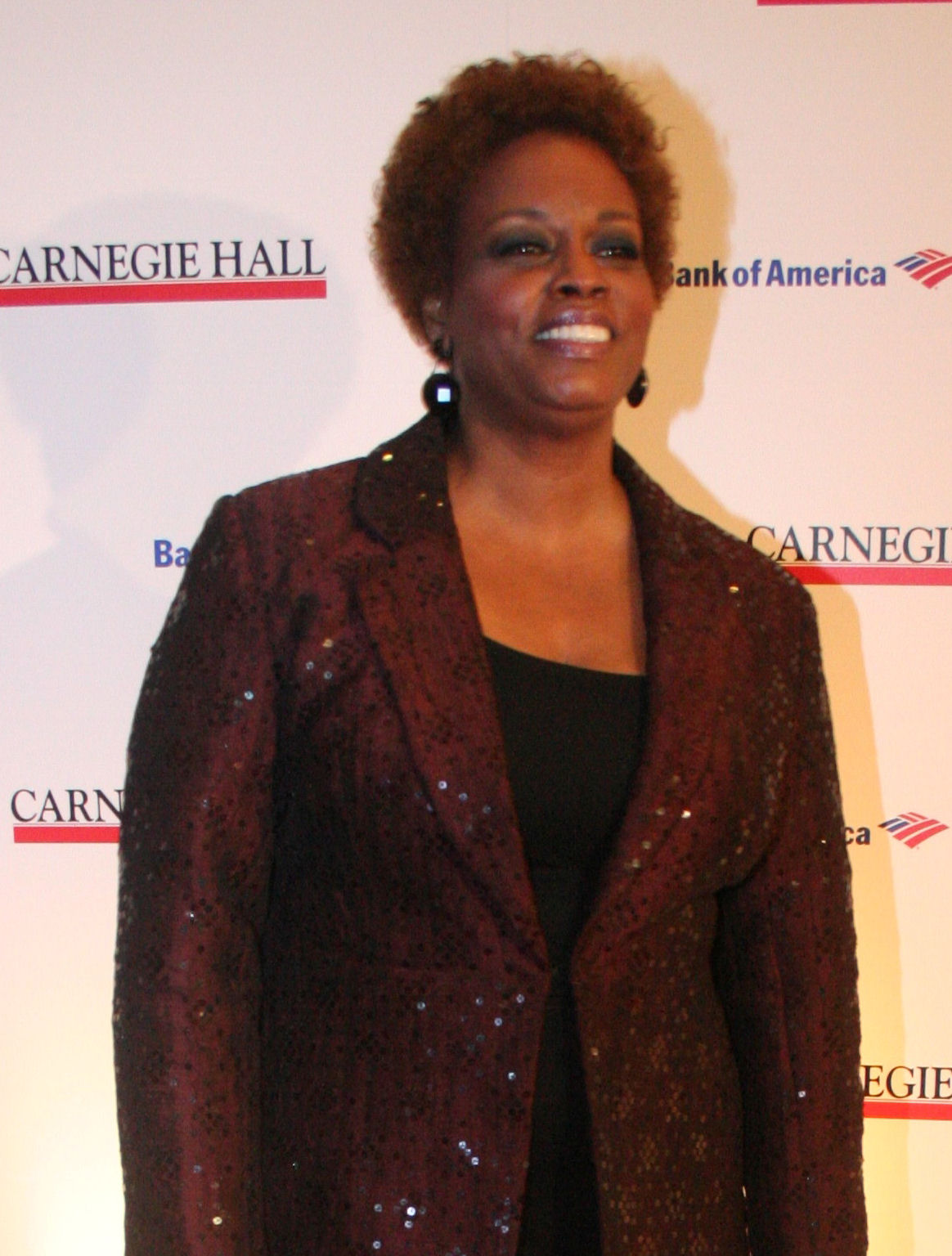
Reeves in April 2011

- Welcome to My Love (Palo Alto, 1982)
- For Every Heart (TBA & Tapes, 1984)
- Ballerina with Marcy Levy (BBC, 1984)
- Dianne Reeves (Blue Note, 1987)
- The Nearness of You (Blue Note, 1988)
- Never Too Far (EMI, 1989)
- I Remember (Blue Note, 1991)
- Quiet After the Storm (Blue Note, 1994)
- Art & Survival (EMI, 1994)
- Three Ladies of Jazz: Live in New York (Jazz Door, 1995)
- The Grand Encounter (Blue Note, 1996)
- New Morning (Blue Note, 1997)
- That Day (Blue Note, 1997)
- Bridges (Blue Note, 1999)
- In the Moment – Live in Concert (Blue Note, 2000)
- The Calling: Celebrating Sarah Vaughan (Blue Note, 2001)
- A Little Moonlight (Blue Note, 2003)
- Christmas Time Is Here (Blue Note, 2004)
- Good Night, and Good Luck (Concord Jazz, 2005)
- Music For Lovers (Blue Note, 2006)
- When You Know (Blue Note, 2008)
- Beautiful Life (Concord, 2013)
- Light Up the Night: Live in Marciac (Concord, 2016)
- Star Child (Arkadia, 2026)

== Filmography ==
- 1991: Appeared as singer in Guilty by Suspicion, directed by Irwin Winkler
- 2005: Appeared as jazz singer in Good Night, and Good Luck, directed by George Clooney
- 2005: Dianne Reeves "Live in Montreal" (Montreal International Jazz Festival 2000)
- 2008: Dianne Reeves: The Early Years, with Billy Childs and Snooky Young

== Awards and honors ==
=== Grammy awards ===
The Grammy Awards are awarded annually by the National Academy of Recording Arts and Sciences. Reeves has received five awards out of nine nominations.

| Year | Category | Nominated work | Result |
|---|---|---|---|
| 1990 | Best Jazz Vocal Performance, Female | I Got It Bad And That Ain't Good (Track) | Nominated |
| 1995 | Best Jazz Vocal Performance | Quiet After The Storm (Album) | Nominated |
| 1998 | Best Jazz Vocal Performance | "That Day... (Album)" | Nominated |
| 1999 | Best Jazz Vocal Performance | Bridges (Album) | Nominated |
| 2000 | Best Jazz Vocal Album | In the Moment – Live in Concert | Won |
| 2001 | Best Jazz Vocal Album | The Calling: Celebrating Sarah Vaughan | Won |
| 2003 | Best Jazz Vocal Album | A Little Moonlight | Won |
| 2005 | Best Gospel Performance, Contemporary Or Inspirational | "Good Night, and Good Luck" | Won |
| 2014 | Best Jazz Vocal Album | "Beautiful Life" | Won |

- 2003: Honorary doctorate, Berklee College of Music
- 2015: Best Album, Jazz FM Awards, Beautiful Life
- 2015: Honorary doctorate, The Juilliard School
- 2018: NEA Jazz Masters
