= Steve Wilson (jazz musician) =

American jazz multi-instrumentalist (born 1961)

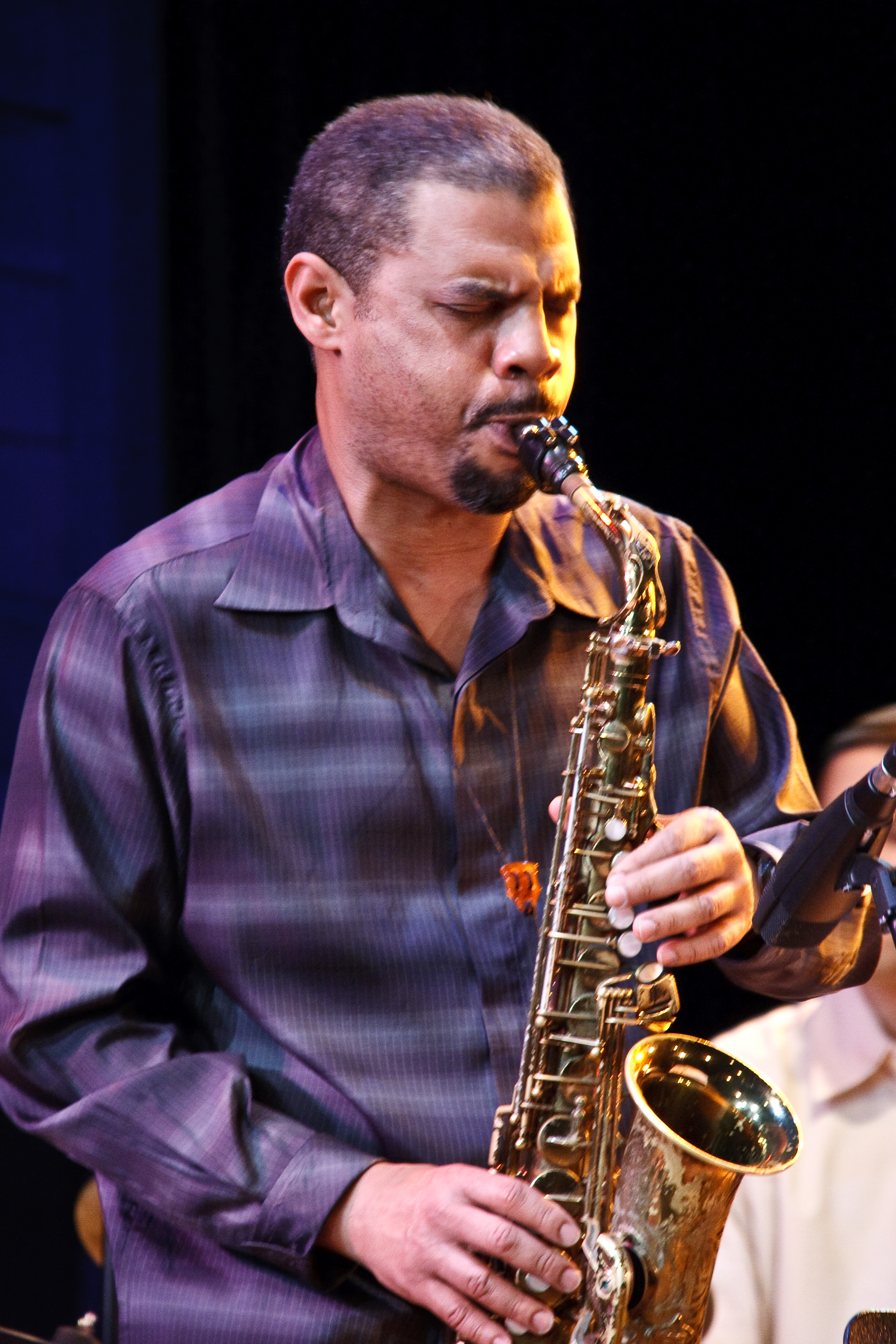
- The Steve Wilson Quartet in Charlottesville, Virginia

Background information
- Born: February 9, 1961 (age 65); Hampton, Virginia, U.S.
- Genres: Jazz, R&B, funk
- Occupations: Musician, teacher
- Instruments: Saxophone, flute
- Years active: 1986–present
- Label: Blue Note/EMI
- Formerly of: Out of the Blue, Steve Wilson Quartet, Generations, The Blue Note 7
- Website: www.stevewilsonmusic.com

Steve Wilson (born February 9, 1961) is an American jazz multi-instrumentalist, who is best known in the musical community as a flutist and an alto and soprano saxophonist. He also plays the clarinet and the piccolo. Wilson performs on many different instruments and has performed and recorded on over twenty-five albums. His interests include folk, jazz, classical, world music, and experimental music. Wilson has been on faculty at The Juilliard School, Manhattan School of Music, Purchase College, William Paterson University, and Jazz House Kids. Since 2013 he has been Professor of Music and Director of Jazz Studies at City College of New York. He is also co-director of the Ravinia Steans Music Institute Program for Jazz. Wilson has maintained a busy career working as a session musician, and has contributed to many musicians of note both on recordings and as a sideman on tours. Over the years he has participated in engagements with several musical ensembles, as well as his own solo efforts.

== Biography ==
As a teenager, Wilson played in rhythm and blues (R&B) and funk bands. After a year accompanying singer Stephanie Mills, he attended Virginia Commonwealth University in Richmond where he majored in music. In 1987 he moved to New York City, where he established himself as a sideman. He performed with the American Jazz Orchestra, the Mingus Big Band, and the Smithsonian Jazz Orchestra. In 1988, he toured Europe with Lionel Hampton. Early in his career he was a member of Out of the Blue, a group which featured young artists signed to the Blue Note label.

Wilson was the subject of a 1996 New York Times profile, entitled "A Sideman's Life". That year he joined the Dave Holland Quintet. From 1998 to 2001, he was a member of Chick Corea's Origin sextet. He played and recorded on Japanese composer Yoko Kanno's debut album, Song to Fly and part of The Seatbelts' New York Musicians during that period.

In 1997, he formed the Steve Wilson Quartet with pianist Bruce Barth, double bassist Ed Howard, and drummer Adam Cruz. The group performed for over a decade and recorded two albums. He also headed a larger ensemble, Generations, which performed jazz and original compositions, and he has performed in a duo with drummer Lewis Nash.

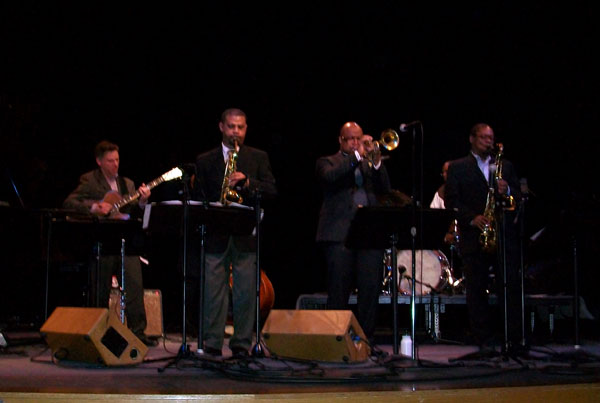
Wilson performing with The Blue Note 7 at the Manchester Craftsmen's Guild in Pittsburgh April 4, 2009

In May 2007, he performed as a soloist for Queen Elizabeth II and Prince Philip during the Jamestown, Virginia quadricentennial. Wilson is on the faculty at the Manhattan School of Music, City College of New York, State University of New York at Purchase, and Columbia University. He has been an artist-in-residence at the University of North Carolina, Hamilton College, Old Dominion University, and with the CITYFOLK arts program in Dayton, Ohio.

A septet formed that year in honor of the imminent 70th anniversary of Blue Note Records. The group recorded an album in 2008, entitled Mosaic, which was released in 2009 on Blue Note/EMI, and toured the United States in promotion of the album from January until April 2009. The group plays the music of Blue Note Records from various artists, with arrangements by members of the band and Renee Rosnes.

In 2010, Wilson celebrated his 50th birthday at Jazz Standard in New York City. He led six bands in six nights, with jazz musicians that included Karrin Allyson, Bruce Barth, Adam Cruz, Carla Cook, Ed Howard, Lewis Nash, Ugonna Okegwo, Jeff "Tain" Watts, Freddie Hendrix, Christian McBride, Mulgrew Miller, Linda Oh, Geoffrey Keezer, and John Wikan. One special feature was the inclusion of a string section to play music from Bird with Strings. It was composed of Diane Monroe, Nardo Poy, Joyce Hammann, Chern Hwei, and Troy Stuart. The Wall Street Journal wrote a full-length feature article.

In 2017, Wilson released a vinyl LP titled Sit Back, Relax & Unwind which was recorded, mixed and mastered with analog technology (live to analog tape) by J.M.I. Recordings. The band on the album was Ray Angry, Ben Williams and Willie Jones III.

== Discography ==
=== As leader ===
- New York Summit (Criss Cross Jazz, 1991) with Mulgrew Miller, James Genus
- Blues for Marcus (Criss Cross, 1993) with Steve Nelson, Bruce Barth, James Genus, Lewis Nash
- Step Lively (Criss Cross, 1993) with Cyrus Chestnut, Freddie Bryant, Dennis Irwin
- Four for Time (Criss Cross, 1994) with Bruce Barth, Larry Grenadier, Leon Parker
- Generations (Stretch, 1998) with Mulgrew Miller, Ray Drummond
- Passages (Stretch, 1999) with Nicholas Payton, Bruce Barth, Ed Howard, Adam Cruz
- Soulful Song (Maxjazz, 2003) with Rene Marie, Carla Cook, Bruce Barth, Ed Howard, Adam Cruz
- Home (We Always Swing, 2010) Co-leader with Bruce Barth, Recorded Live in Columbia, MO
- Sit Back, Relax, & Unwind (J.M.I. Recordings, 2017) with Ray Angry, Ben Williams, and Willie Jones III.

=== As sideman ===
- Carl Allen/Rodney Whitaker, Get Ready (Mack Avenue)
- Karrin Allyson, In Blue (Concord)
- Karrin Allyson, Ballads: Remembering John Coltrane (Concord)
- DMP Big Band, Tribute to Duke Ellington (DMP)
- DMP Big Band, Carved in Stone (DMP)
- Rob Bargad, Better Times(Criss Cross)
- Bruce Barth, Morning Call (Enja)
- Bruce Barth, In Focus (Enja)
- Bruce Barth, Hope Springs Eternal (Double Time)
- Bruce Barth, East and West (Maxjazz)
- Noah Baerman, Soul Force (Lemel)
- Louie Bellson, Live from NYC (Telarc)
- David Berkman, Handmade (Palmetto)
- David Berkman, Communication Theory (Palmetto)
- Chris Berger, Conversations (KSJazz)
- Paul Bollenback, Soul Grooves (Challenge Records)
- Jimmy Bosch, Singing Trombone (Ryko)
- Don Braden, After Dark (Criss Cross)
- Michael Brecker, Wide Angles (Verve)
- Donald Brown, Car Tunes (Muse)
- Donald Brown, Send One Our Love (Muse)
- Bill Bruford, Earthworks Underground Orchestra (Summerfold)
- Freddie Bryant, Take your Dance into Battle (Jazz City/Spirit)
- Freddie Bryant, Boogaloo Brasiliero, (Fresh Sound)
- Freddie Bryant, Kaleidoscope, (Fresh Sound)
- Laverne Butler, A Foolish Thing To Do (Maxjazz)
- Charlie Byrd, Louis, (Concord)
- Don Byron, Bug Music, (Nonesuch)
- Ron Carter, Great Big Band, (EMI)
- Billy Childs, Map to the Treasure: Reimagining Laura Nyro (Sony Masterworks)
- Billy Childs, The Child Within, (Shanachie/Cachet)
- Avishai Cohen, Adama, (Stretch)
- Chick Corea, Corea Concerto, (Sony/Stretch) (Grammy Winner)
- Chick Corea, Rendezvous in New York, (Stretch)
- Chick Corea, Elektric Band: To The Stars, (Stretch)
- Chick Corea & Origin, Live at the Blue Note, (Stretch)
- Chick Corea & Origin, A Week at the Blue Note, (Stretch)
- Chick Corea & Origin, Change, (Stretch)
- Chick Corea & Origin, Originations, (Stretch)
- Roz Corral, Telling Tales, (Blu Jazz)
- Steve Davis, Portrait in Sound, (Stretch)
- Dena DeRose, Introducing Dena DeRose, (Amosaya)
- Dena DeRose, Another World, (Sharp Nine)
- Kenny Drew, Jr., Follow the Spirit, (Sirocco)
- George Duke, Duke, (BPM)
- Billy Drummond, Native Colours, (Criss Cross. 1992)
- Greg Gisbert, On Second Thought, (Criss Cross)
- Darrell Grant, Truth and Reconciliation, (Origin)
- Edsel Gomez, Cubist Music, (Zoho Music)
- Kevin Bruce Harris, Folk Songs/Folk Tales, (Enja)
- Stefon Harris, A Cloud of Red Dust, (Blue Note)
- Kevin Hays, El Matador, (Jazz City)
- David Hazeltine, How It Is, (Criss Cross)
- Joe Henderson, Big Band, Verve (Grammy Winner)
- Dave Holland, Points of View, ECM (Grammy Winner)
- Chie Imaizumi, A Time of New Beginnings, Capri Records
- Ingrid Jensen & Project O, Now As Then, Jig Records
- Ingrid Jensen, Vernal Fields, Enja
- Kelley Johnson, Make Someone Happy, Sapphire
- Ronnie Jordan, A Brighter Day, Blue Note/Angel
- Yoko Kanno, Song To Fly, Victor Entertainment
- Geoffrey Keezer, Falling Up, Maxjazz
- Jonny King, Meltdown, Enja
- Steve Kroon, El Mas Alla (Beyond, Kroonatune)
- Mike LeDonne, Tribute to Milt Jackson, Double-Time
- Victor Lewis, 3 Way Conversation, Red Records
- Dave Liebman, Classique, Owl
- Gunnar Mossblad, The Seasons Reflected Soul Note/CAM
- Didier Lockwood, Storyboard, Dreyfus
- Kevin Mahogany, Songs & Moments, Enja
- Pete Malinverni, Make A Joyful Noise, ArtistShare
- Mulgrew Miller, The Sequel, Maxjazz
- Allison Miller, 5AM, Stroll
- Foxhaven, Bill Mobley New Light Space Time
- Stephanie Mills Tantalizingly Hot 20th Century Fox
- Gunnar Mossblad, Convergence (Mossblad Music)
- Gunnar Mossblad & The Manhattan Sax Ensemble, The Dogwalk (GPC Recordings)
- Shunzo Ohno, Maya (Three Blind Mice)
- Junko Onishi, Junko Onishi (Nippon Crown)
- Out of the Blue, OTB, “Spiral Staircase” (Blue Note)
- Leon Parker, Belief (Sony)
- Leon Parker, Awakening (Sony)
- Clarence Penn, Saomaye (Verve Japan)
- Ken Peplowski, A Good Reed (Concord)
- Ralph Peterson, Art of Blakey (Blue Note)
- Ralph Peterson, Reclamation Project (Evidence)
- Ralph Peterson, The Fo'tet Plays Monk (Evidence)
- Ralph Peterson, V (Blue Note)
- Ralph Peterson, Volition (Blue Note)
- Leslie Pintchik Quartets Ambient Records
- Mika Pohjola Northern Sunrise Blue Music Group
- Dianne Reeves, The Calling: A Tribute to Sarah Vaughn, Blue Note (Grammy Winner)
- Dianne Reeves, Christmas Time Is Here, Blue Note
- Renee Rosnes, For The Moment (Blue Note)
- Renee Rosnes, Written In The Rocks (Smoke Sessions)
- Michele Rosewoman, Qunitessence/Harvest Enja
- Michele Rosewoman, Quintessence / Guardians of the Light Enja
- Maria Schneider, Sky Blue ArtistShare
- Loren Schoenberg, Manhattan Work Song Jazz Heritage
- Loren Schoenberg, Out of this World TCB Music
- David Schumacher, Another Life Amosaya
- Jae Sinnett, The Sinnett ngs J-Net Records
- Jae Sinnett, House and Sinnett PositiveMusic
- Neal Smith, Live at Smalls Smalls Live
- Smithsonian Jazz Orchestra, Big Band Treasure-Live Smithsonian
- Terell Stafford, New Beginnings Maxjazz
- Terell Stafford, Time to Let Go Candid
- Bill Stewart, Telepathy Blue Note
- Joan Stiles, Hurly-Burly Oo-Bla-Dee
- Sunny Sumter, Getting to Know You J. Jordan Music
- Tom Varner, Swimming Omnitone Records
- Melissa Walker, Invitation to Love Enja
- Michael Weiss, Soul Journey Sintra Records
- Scott Wendholt, From Now On Criss Cross
- Buster Williams, Joined at the Hip TCB
- James Williams Jazz Dialogues, Vol. 1, Will Power (Finas Music)
- James Williams Jazz Dialogues, Vol. 4, Music For A While (Finas Music)
- James Williams & ICU, Truth, Justice & the Blues (Evidence)
- James Williams & ICU, We've Got What You Need (Evidence)
- James Williams Quintet, Live at Mills Hall (La Dome)
- Michael Wolff, Joe's Strut (Wrong Records)
- Anthony Wonsey, Exodus (Alfa Jazz, 1996)
- Gerald Wilson, In My Time (Mack Avenue, 2005)
- Gerald Wilson, Monterey Moods (Mack Avenue, 2007)
- Kenny Barron, The Traveler (Sunnyside, 2008)
- Gerald Wilson, Detroit (Mack Avenue, 2009)
- Yōsuke Yamashita, Field of Grooves (Verve, 2009)
- Christian McBride, Kind of Brown (Mack Avenue, 2009)
- Miho Hazama, Journey to Journey (Verve, 2012)
- Roberta Piket, One for Marian: Celebrating Marian McPartland (Thirteen Note, 2016)
- Christian McBride, Bringin' It (Mack Avenue, 2017)
- Christian McBride, Live at the Village Vanguard (Mack Avenue, 2021)
