= American Landscape =

American Landscape may refer to:

- American Landscape (David Benoit album), 1997
- American Landscape (Bruce Barth album), 2003
- American Landscape, two compositions by Soon Hee Newbold, 2006 and 2017 respectively
- American Landscapes, two albums by the Peter Brötzmann Chicago Tentet
