= Don't Take Your Time =

Studio album by Erin Bode
- Released: June 8, 2004
- Recorded: December 3–4, 2003
- Genre: Vocal jazz
- Label: Maxjazz
- Producer: Bruce Barth

Erin Bode chronology
Don't Take Your Time (2004)	Over and Over (2006)

Don't Take Your Time is the first major studio album released by jazz singer Erin Bode. It was recorded over two days at the beginning of December 2003 and released on June 8, 2004 by the label Maxjazz. It has been regarded as "an impressive affair" and that Bode has "irresistibility impossible to deny."

The album contains mostly covers of songs from various genres and Bode is backed by a studio band. The album only one song exclusively penned by Bode and her collaborator, pianist Adam Maness (who would have more impact on her second album, Over and Over).

== Track listing ==
1. "Don't Take Your Time" (Bode, Maness) — 3:44
2. "Here, There and Everywhere" (Lennon, McCartney) — 4:12
3. "In the Pines" (Monroe) — 5:00
4. "Tonight I'll Be Staying Here With You" (Dylan) — 4:49
5. "Time After Time" (Hyman, Lauper) — 4:53
6. "But Not for Me" (Gershwin, Gershwin) — 3:59
7. "Junior and Julie" (Dennis) — 3:14
8. "If It's Magic" (Wonder) — 4:16
9. "I've Never Been in Love Before" (Loesser) — 3:48
10. "You" (Shanks, Thiele, Tonio K.) — 4:13
11. "I Walk a Little Faster" (Coleman, Leigh) — 4:16
12. "Gee Baby Ain't I Good to You" (Razaf, Redman) — 3:41
13. "Count Your Blessings" (Berlin) — 7:25
- A bonus multimedia track was included of "Don't Take Your Time".

== Personnel ==
Band:

- Erin Bode — vocals
- Jerry Barnes — vocals (background)
- Bruce Barth — piano, arranger, producer
- Montez Coleman — drums
- Steve Nelson Quartet — vibraphone
- Meg Okura — violin
- Adam Rogers — guitar, slide guitar

Production:

- David Baker — engineer, mixing
- Peter Doris, Brian Montgomery — assistant engineers
- Larry Grenadier — bass
- Pressley Jacobs — art Direction, design
- Dena Katz, Jimmy Katz — photography
- Katsuhiko Naito — mastering

== Reception ==
Professional ratings
Review scores
Source	Rating
Allmusic	4/5 stars

Although it was her first major label recording, Bode garnered much praise from the jazz community. Allmusic (AMG) states in their review that she "is very deserving of nationwide exposure." Though not the Erin Bode Band that would follow her on tour and on her next album, the backing studio band also receives attention. PortFolio Weekly reviewer Jim Newsom comments on Bode's rendition of Bob Dylan's "Tonight I'll Be Staying Here With You" as "a soul-jazz pocket, pushed by Bruce Barth's gospelly piano", which AMG also calls "bluesy" on the track "Gee Baby, Ain't I Good to You."

Bode's cover of Cyndi Lauper's "Time After Time" garnered much playing time on the radio, especially in her local state. AMG, however, stated that the track "sticks a little too close to the pop world." The lone Bode composed track on the album, the title song "Don't Take Your Time", also received considerable airplay, solidifying "an incredible fan base and airplay to follow." Newsom calls the track "a journey through territory not too far removed from that of Norah Jones, but with more punch."
