= Hurricane (Kanye West and the Weeknd song) =

2021 single by Kanye West and the Weeknd

Single by Kanye West and the Weeknd featuring Lil Baby

from the album Donda
- Released: September 14, 2021
- Recorded: March 2018; September 2018–August 2021
- Studio: Archwood Music (Los Angeles)
- Genre: R&B; pop; hip-hop; gospel
- Length: 4:04
- Label: GOOD; Def Jam
- Songwriters: Kanye West; Abel Tesfaye; Dominque Armani Jones; Albert Daniels; Cailin Russo; Charles Njapa; Christopher Ruelas; Cydel Young; Daniel Seeff; Dexter Mills; Henry Walter; Josh Mease; Khalil Abdul-Rahman; Malik Yusef; Mark Mbogo; Mark Williams; Mike Dean; Nasir Pemberton; Orlando Wilder; Raul Cubina; Ronald Spence Jr.; Sam Barsh; Tobias Smith
- Producers: Kanye West; BoogzDaBeast; DJ Khalil; Mike Dean; Ronny J

Kanye West singles chronology
"Smack DVD" (2021)	"Hurricane" (2021)	"Life of the Party" (2021)

The Weeknd singles chronology
"Die for It" (2021)	"Hurricane" (2021)	"Moth to a Flame" (2021)

Lil Baby singles chronology
"Body in Motion" (2021)	"Hurricane" (2021)	"Girls Want Girls" (2021)

Music video
- "Hurricane" on YouTube

"Hurricane" is a song by American rapper Kanye West and Canadian singer-songwriter the Weeknd featuring fellow American rapper Lil Baby, from the former's tenth studio album Donda (2021). The song was produced by West alongside BoogzDaBeast, DJ Khalil, Mike Dean, and Ronny J, with co-production and additional production from several others. The track also features additional vocals from the Sunday Service Choir and KayCyy. It came from a jam session at Archwood Music Studio, based in Los Angeles, and was passed on by Chance the Rapper to West, who shared a preview of the track in September 2018.

The song was originally slated for inclusion on West's since scrapped album, Yandhi, and went through multiple reiterations prior to release, with the final version being debuted in July 2021. On August 8, 2021, it was accidentally made available via certain streaming services before being pulled less than 24 hours later, but was officially released with the rest of the album on August 29, 2021. It was also eventually sent to US rhythmic contemporary radio stations as the album's lead single on September 14, by GOOD Music and Def Jam. An R&B, hip-hop, and pop jam with an atmospheric beat, it contains organs and bass.

In the lyrics of the song, West touches on personal issues. "Hurricane" received generally positive reviews from music critics, who mostly highlighted the Weeknd's feature. Some praised the song's creativity, while a number of them complimented Lil Baby's verse. It was named to year-end lists for 2021 by multiple publications, including Complex and Slant Magazine. The song won Best Melodic Rap Performance at the 64th Annual Grammy Awards, leading to West tying Jay-Z's record for the most Grammys among rappers.

"Hurricane" charted at number six on the US Billboard Hot 100, alongside reaching number one on the Hot R&B/Hip-Hop, Gospel, and Christian Songs charts. The song scored top 10 positions in 10 other countries, including New Zealand and the United Kingdom. It has been certified platinum in both the United States and Canada by the Recording Industry Association of America (RIAA) and Music Canada (MC), respectively. An accompanying animated music video debuted on March 8, 2022. Digital masked avatars appear in the video, escaping the ADX Florence prison building and watching the baptizing of a faceless representation of Jesus.

The song was performed live by the Sunday Service Choir on multiple occasions, including at a 2021 Halloween concert with Justin Bieber. The song was also performed by West at the Free Larry Hoover Benefit Concert, during his second set. Artist Revenue Advocates (ARA) issued a lawsuit against West for unauthorized elements of "MSD PT2" in July 2024, accusing him of not having obtained a license for usage on the song; though the court determined that the final song did not contain any audio samples, earlier previews did and were argued to be commercialized.

== Background and recording ==
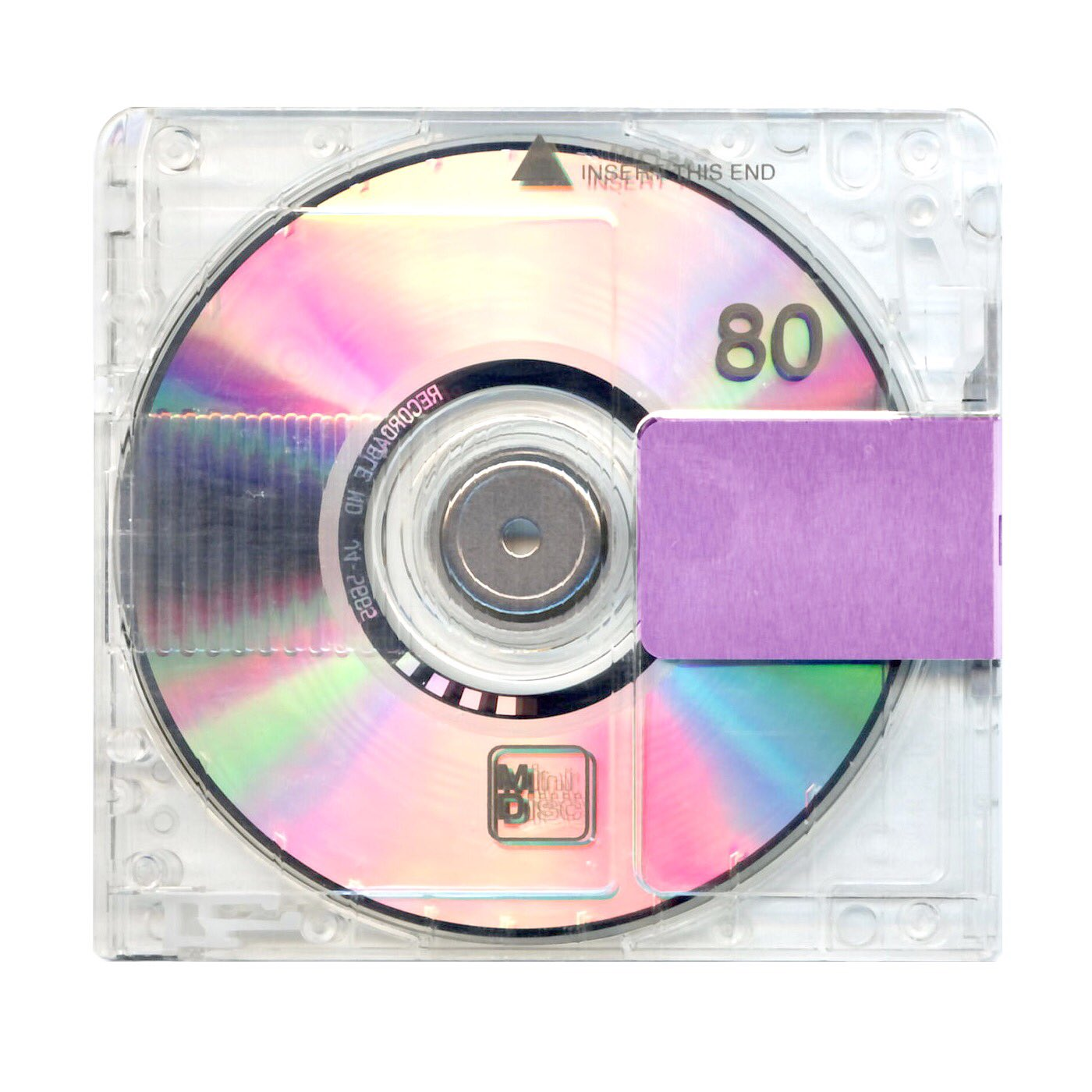
"Hurricane" originated from sessions for Yandhi and was slated to be included on the album, before being shelved.

=== 2018-2019 - Early work on the song ===
The foundation of "Hurricane" came from a three-hour jam session at Archwood Music Studio between American music producer DJ Khalil, bassist Daniel Seeff, and songwriters Josh Mease and Sam Barsh. This version, a one minute instrumental titled "MSD PT2", was later sent to producer Nascent through a Dropbox folder in March 2018. In July 2018, Chance the Rapper announced that West was coming to Chicago to produce a seven-track studio album for him, similar to those recorded during the Wyoming Sessions. According to producer BoogzDaBeast, the beat for the song was originally intended for Chance the Rapper, who passed on it after hearing it. However, when West heard the beat, Boogz recalled that it "sparked something in him", leading to the creation of the song and his now-scrapped album Yandhi, which was set to release two weeks after the demo was recorded.

On September 11, 2018, West reinstated his Instagram account, via which he subsequently shared a snippet of a demo version for "Hurricane", including him singing the chorus; the demo was recorded one day prior to being previewed. A week later, West announced via Twitter that Yandhi was set for release on September 29, 2018. West reaffirmed that the song was set to be included on the album via a snippet posted to Twitter on September 27, 2018. Yandhi went unreleased on its scheduled date and was eventually scrapped. Over time, "Hurricane" went through several iterations, containing vocals from Ant Clemons, Big Sean, Ty Dolla Sign, and Young Thug, with several leaks of the song surfacing online. Though Yandhi had been shelved, "Hurricane" later went into consideration for Donda and created heavy anticipation.

After postponing the release of Yandhi twice, West revealed on Twitter that his recording sessions with Chance the Rapper in Chicago had helped himself reconnect with his roots and faith in Jesus. In early 2019, West started hosting choir sessions with the gospel group The Samples, enlisting choir director Jason White and songwriter Nikki Grier for help with choir arrangement and writing gospel renditions of songs in his discography. Clemons recalled that the sessions eventually "morphed" into West's gospel group the Sunday Service Choir, who performed around the world with the rapper. West recorded with the group for their debut studio album Jesus Is Born (2019), which is credited solely to them. The Sunday Service Choir were one of the guest appearances on Donda to be revealed at the public listening parties, while they contributed additional vocals to six of the album's tracks outside of "Hurricane".

=== 2020-2021 - Donda sessions ===
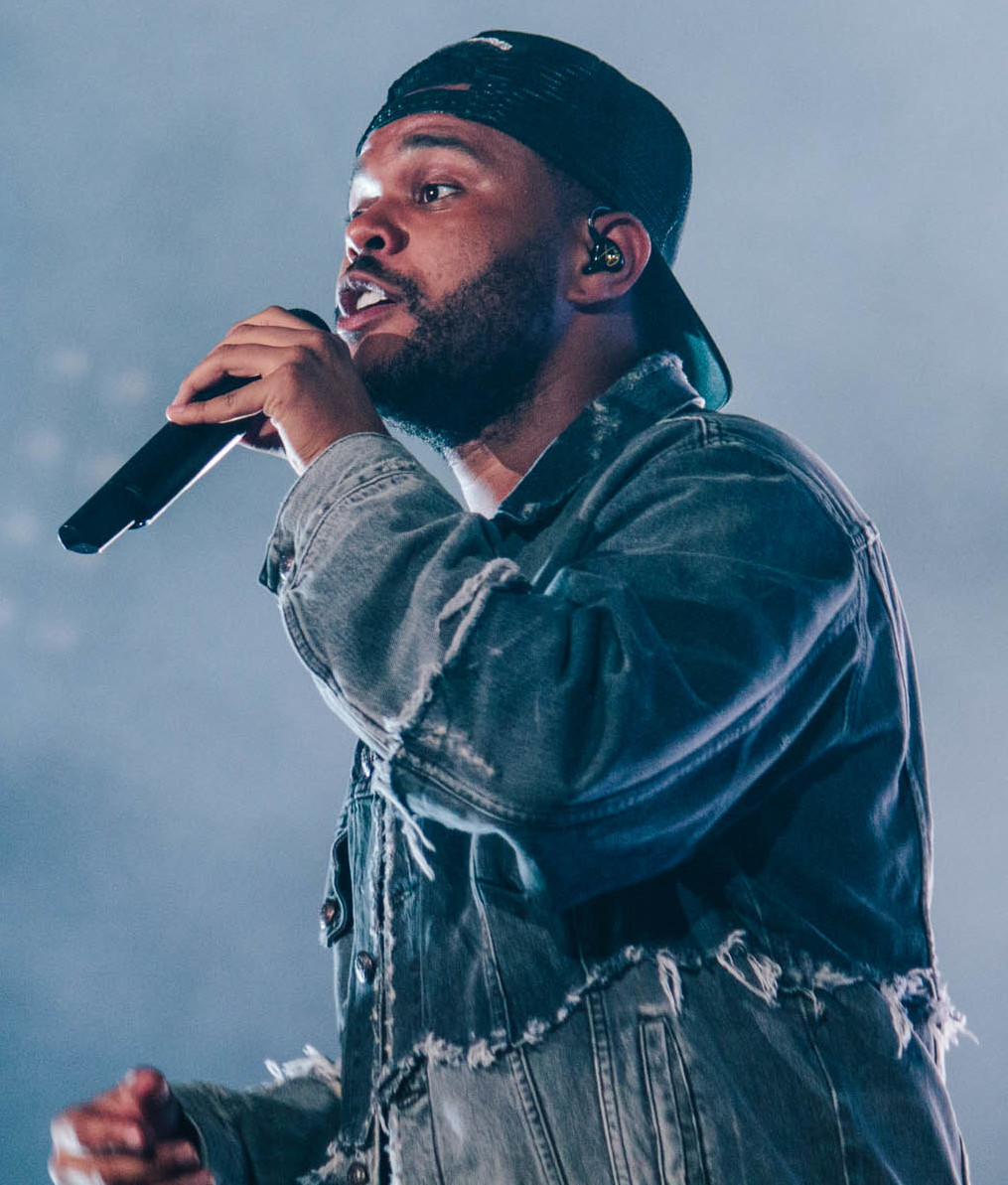
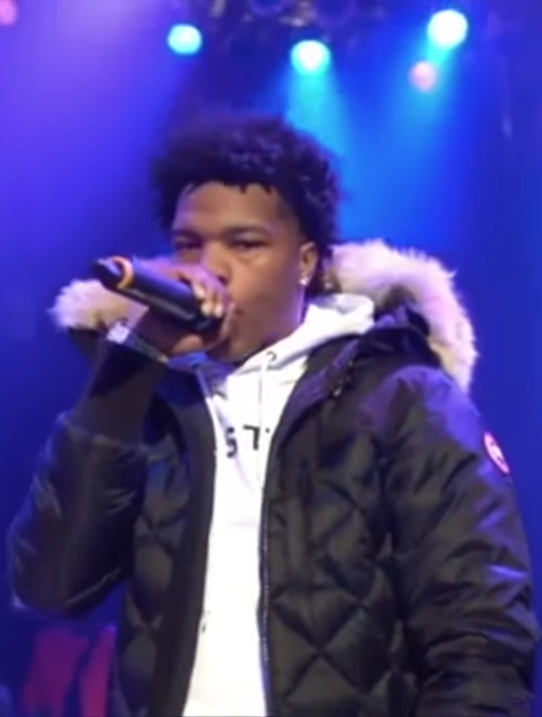
After the song went through several reiterations, the final version of "Hurricane" features vocals from the Weeknd (left) and Lil Baby (right).

On July 21, 2020, West tweeted "Lil Baby my favorite rapper but won't do a song wit me [sic]". Responding to the tweet, Lil Baby declared that nobody had told him West wanted to collaborate and the two arranged a meeting. The rapper was subsequently flown out to Cody, Wyoming, to record for Donda. During the session, Lil Baby recorded his verse for "Hurricane" after Kenyan-American singer songwriter KayCyy had suggested that he should contribute to it, having told him that it was one of the most anticipated songs. In an attempt to appear on the track, KayCyy recorded a bridge which West "actually ended up fucking with", according to the singer. The reworked song was first previewed officially on July 22, 2021, during the first listening party for Donda at Mercedes Benz Stadium in Atlanta. The version played at the event featured a hook that was "heavily autotuned" and performed by West himself.

In an cover story interview for GQ on August 2, 2021, Canadian singer-songwriter the Weeknd stated, "I'd love to work with Kanye again. Especially on production." The two had worked together twice in the past; firstly when a West demo evolved into the Weeknd's "Tell Your Friends" (2015); and the singer featured on West's 2016 track "FML" for their second collaboration. Shortly after the interview, West posted a photo of his call log to Instagram that included "Abel Weeknd", leading to speculation of the Weeknd being included on Donda. "Hurricane" was teased again on August 5, 2021, with the Weeknd performing the hook during the second listening party for the album at Mercedes Benz Stadium. Two days later, American music producer and frequent West collaborator Mike Dean went to Discord and Twitter to ask fans which version of "Hurricane" they preferred between the original version, new version, or a blend of the two. Dean stated in the Discord chat that he was showing West comments from fans; he also told Zane Lowe in an Apple Music interview that West "took all the information he got from everyone, including online reviews, personal friends reviews and he'd just kind of digest it all and adjust the album the way he wants".

== Composition and lyrics ==
"Hurricane"
A 24-second sample of "Hurricane", demonstrating the layered organs and heavy bass. The chorus features the Weeknd letting out confidence while accompanied by the Sunday Service Choir towards the end, whose processed vocals are triggered and cut off in a sampler style. After the chorus, Lil Baby delivers a mournful verse.

Musically, "Hurricane" is an R&B, hip-hop, and pop jam. It utilizes West's typical production style, relying on an atmospheric beat, while including layered organs, heavy bass, and trap drums. It features processed vocals by the Sunday Service Choir that are triggered and cut off in the style of a sampler, moving between digital and choral styles, which was done by Italian mixing engineer Irko at the request of West over a phone call. According to Rolling Stone's Paul Thompson, the choir vocals are processed "in ways that are slightly alien". Alongside the group, additional vocals are provided by KayCyy. West and Lil Baby perform a verse each on the song, while the Weeknd sings the chorus. He delivers gospel-infused vocals, as well as contributing a falsetto. The song's vocal production was handled by White and Grier, while Louis Bell and Patrick Hundley did the editing.

Lyrically, West discusses ongoing personal issues on the song, such as his breakup with Kardashian, his house, past, and fears. The hook sees the Weeknd exude confidence, singing: "Finally free, found the God in me / And I want you to see, I can walk on water." West presents himself as having engaged in a conversation with God, rapping that he "was up for sale" yet could not tell and then declaring, "God made it rain, the Devil made it hell." With certain lyrics, the rapper reflects on progressing from being a school dropout to a guest speaker at Yale University. Lil Baby provides a mournful performance with his verse, admitting at one point that he simply wants to "restart it".

== Release and promotion ==
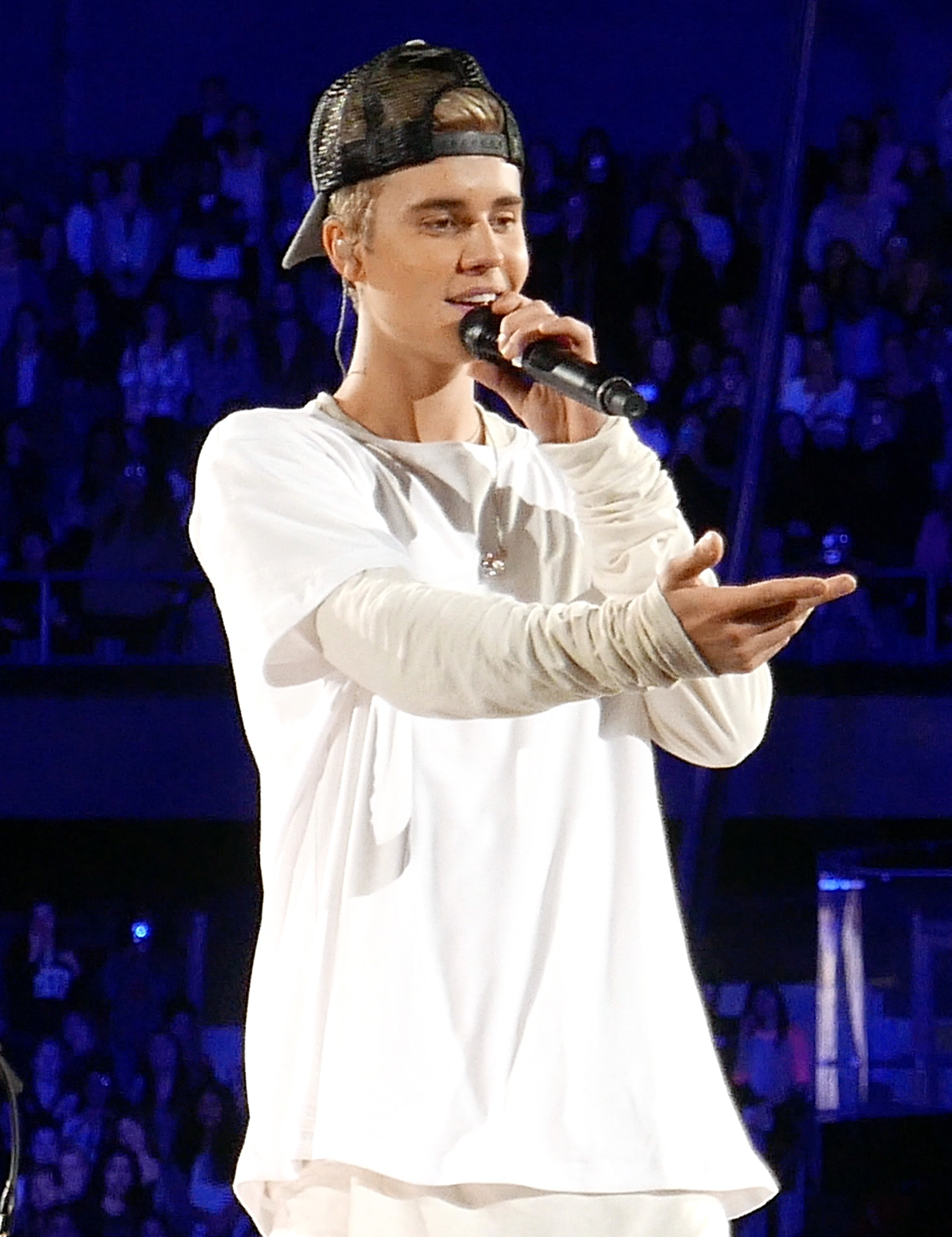
Justin Bieber joined the Sunday Service Choir for a performance of the song at their 2021 Halloween concert, which included him freestyle-singing.

After Donda failed to release on August 6, 2021, "Hurricane" appeared on Apple Music as the second track on the Donda pre-order page. The track was made available via international streaming services such as Yandex and Line Music on August 8, though was not available on any in the United States. On August 29, "Hurricane" was included as the fifth track on West's tenth studio album Donda. The track was playlisted by Swedish mainstream station Sveriges Radio P3 on September 3, 2021. It was sent to American rhythmic contemporary radio stations as the album's lead single 11 days later, through West's labels GOOD Music and Def Jam.

On October 20, 2021, American rapper Big Sean performed his unreleased verse for "Hurricane" as part of a nine-minute freestyle with Power 106's L.A. Leakers. On October 31, 2021, the Sunday Service Choir performed a gospel rendition of "Hurricane" with Canadian singer Justin Bieber for their Halloween concert at an anonymous rooftop location. The group were dressed entirely in white and surrounded by an audience dressed in black, while the singer rocked a white hood. During the performance, Bieber freestyle-sang over the track. On November 7, 2021, a rendition of the song was performed by the Sunday Service Choir for a session in tribute to the victims of a crowd crush at Travis Scott's Astroworld Festival set. The performance was live-streamed, as was the group's performance of it at a session promoting the deluxe edition of Donda a week later. On December 9, 2021, West performed the song at the Los Angeles Memorial Coliseum as part of his and Canadian musician Drake's Free Larry Hoover Benefit Concert. Drake accompanied him on stage and the rapper's performance marked a return after the musician had performed alone, which shocked the audience.

On December 12, 2021, West performed the track as part of a surprise five-song set in the middle of fellow rapper Future's headlining performance at Rolling Loud California. While performing, he rocked a white hoodie, "Free Hoover" jeans, and Yeezy boots. On February 22, 2022, West performed "Hurricane" at the accompanying concert for his eleventh studio album Donda 2 in Miami's LoanDepot Park. During the performance of the song, West appeared to experience an issue with his in-ear monitors and seemingly lost his place, though it was speculated that he forgot the lyrics. The rapper's performance of "Hurricane" was followed by a performance of "Jail pt 2", which featured him reacting to the problem by throwing his microphone.

== Critical reception ==
"Hurricane" was met with generally positive reviews from music critics, many of whom appreciated the Weeknd's feature. In The A.V. Club, Nina Hernandez chose the song as an album highlight due to the Weeknd's appearance. Echoing this opinion at PopMatters, Tony DeGanaro listed the singer's feature amongst the highlights, describing it as sublime. Chris Willman from Variety wrote that he lets out "an unknown gospel side", delivering "a chorus as ineffable as any on his albums". Aaron Loose of Christianity Today saw the song as proof that West is still able to orchestrate "a captivating moment", saying it "rolls into earshot like a wrathful omen" and later develops into "a gorgeous R&B prayer" delivered by the Weeknd. On a similar note, The New York Times critic Jon Caramanica commented that the song shows West maintains the capability "of orchestrating impressive pop music", creating a "disarmingly pretty" track with the Weeknd's "sweet vocals". Thomas Hobbs from The Guardian observed that West comes across as more authentic on the song and "less like someone delivering the doctrine of a corporate superchurch", while also noting "a massive hook" from the Weeknd, who "projects walk-on-water confidence". Writing for DIY, Ryan Bell pointed it out as Donda's closest resemblance to the hits that West used to create, attributing this to the Weeknd's "smooth hook" and "an atmospheric beat with an ominous gospel inflection".

At Exclaim, Riley Wallace asserted that the Weeknd and Lil Baby's features "help alley-oop Ye" one of his best works for years. Mark Richardson of The Wall Street Journal stated that because of the singer's "gospel-drenched vocals" and the rapper's guest verse, the song "merits repeat plays". Vulture's Craig Jenkins pointed to West and the aforementioned two as "one of the better rapper-singer collaborations" of 2021, depicting the rapper as not seeming "labored with his flow". In the Los Angeles Times, Mikael Wood lauded the song as "a heaving R&B jam" and considered "a mournful Lil Baby" to be the main star. Thompson viewed the collision of digital and choral palettes when the Sunday Service Choir's vocals appear as one of the most interesting moments on the album, opining that they are seemingly "instruments at West's disposal" on the "pleading" song. For HipHopDX, David Aaron Brake proclaimed that its layered organs "could soundtrack the ascent to the heavens". Uproxx's Wongo Okon named the song as one of the album's highlights.

Not all reviews were favorable. In a negative review, Jonny Coleman of The Hollywood Reporter found the song's release coincidentally occurring on the same day as Hurricane Ida impacted the Gulf Coast to be distasteful, while he disregarded it as "another generic snooze-fest with all the usual Kanye production touchstones". Coleman felt West's production style had become overused, complaining that "the instrumentation veers into parody at points" when West gets bored or unsure of what to do, even if it is "pretty cool". Loud and Quiet reviewer Robert Davidson wrote off the song as possibly the album's most glaring point that West "opts for lyrical platitudes", assuring his collaboration with the Weeknd and Lil Baby passes by "without ever threatening to quicken the heartbeat", defining it as a "damp squib".

=== Accolades ===
The track was ranked by Complex as the 15th best song of 2021, with Waiss Aramesh praising West's vocal performance, introspective lyricism, and storytelling. It was picked by Slant Magazine as the 24th best song of the year; Charles Lyons-Burt was most impressed by the combination of the Weeknd's "crystal falsetto" with "the magisterial organ and booming trap drums". Exclaim listed the track as the 27th best song of 2021, while The Fader named it the year's 70th best. The song was awarded Best Melodic Rap Performance at the 2022 Grammy Awards, marking West's 24th win at the ceremony and tying him with Jay-Z's record for the most of any rappers.

== Music video ==
In November 2020, a music video was initially shot in Manhattan by frequent West collaborator Hype Williams. Photographs from the shoot surfaced, showing Williams on set with West and Lil Baby. In the end, West went with an animated CGI music video that was directed by French film-maker Arnaud Bresson, who also directed the visual for fellow album track "Heaven and Hell". Production was handled by Laure Salgon, with motion capture being used. On March 8, 2022, a music video for "Hurricane" was premiered.

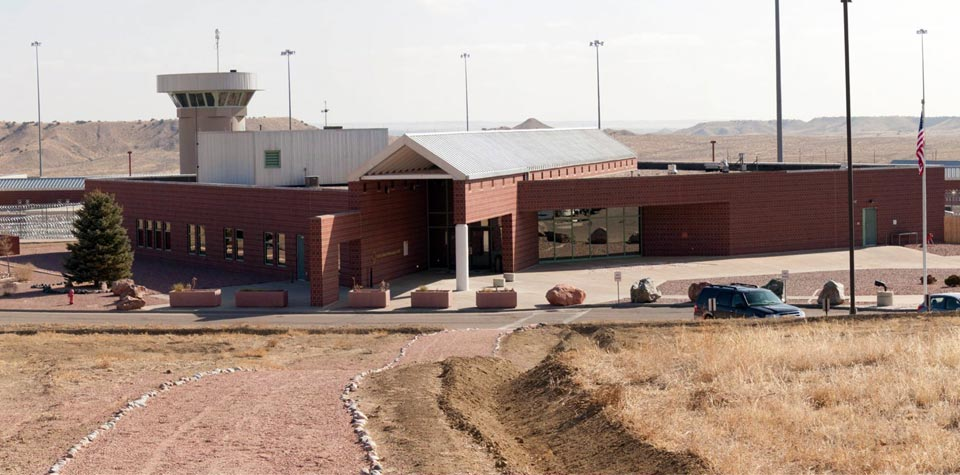
After the opening of the music video, digital avatars appear as an army who climb the fences of Colorado's prison ADX Florence.

An army of digital masked avatars dressed in Yeezy Gap hoodies–resembling the music video released for "Heaven and Hell"–are present in the video, demonstrating a dystopian-looking society. The visual opens with the image of a half land and half water piece of coastline, accompanied by a grey dragon. This is followed by the army of digital avatars climbing fences of the ADX Florence prison building while lightning strikes, appearing merely as silhouettes initially until they can be seen wearing opaque masks. The avatars then escape prison to watch a faceless representation of Jesus get baptized, appearing on a beach where acid rain falls down. In the following scenes, people ascending towards the sky close to a beam of light, while swirling hurricane clouds can be seen. A flash of lightning pierces the sky, inviting the avatars to follow its light. The video also shows clips of West and his collaborators as CGI humanoids performing the song from a "strange heaven-like place". The video ends with a black and white photograph taken from Hurricane Katrina–which killed more than 1,800 people in 2005–of an American flag emerging from a pile of rubble. Wren Graves, writing for Consequence, called the video a "scatterbrained stab at a disaster epic", with "seemingly-unfinished CGI that flickers in and out of focus from frame to incomprehensible frame".

Shortly after the release of the music video, Russian painter Denis Forkas, who has contributed artwork for metal bands such as Behemoth, accused West of plagiarizing his 2017 piece Hortus Aureus in the music video for "Hurricane". Forkas claimed that he had not been contacted by any party involved in the production, and that the artwork was simply re-rendered for the video.

== Commercial performance ==
Upon the release of Donda, "Hurricane" debuted at number six on the US Billboard Hot 100, standing as the album's highest charting track and West's 19th top-20 hit on the chart. The song's entry was powered by 29 million US streams, which led to it topping the Streaming Songs chart and giving West his third number-one. "Hurricane" lasted for 11 weeks on the Hot 100. It further debuted atop the US Hot R&B/Hip-Hop Songs chart, becoming West's eighth chart-topper and his first since "FourFiveSeconds" in 2015. The song stood among the rapper's seven simultaneous top-10 hits on the chart, which tied Drake's 2018 record. It also reached the summit of both the US Christian Songs and Gospel Songs charts, marking West's third number-one on these charts. On the Billboard year-end charts for 2021, the track ranked at numbers two and one on Christian Songs and Gospel Songs, respectively. The song was certified platinum by the Recording Industry Association of America (RIAA) for selling 1,000,000 certified units in the US on January 10, 2022, becoming the album's first single to achieve this certification.

In Canada, the track charted at number four on the Canadian Hot 100. On November 23, 2021, "Hurricane" was certified platinum by Music Canada (MC) for pushing 80,000 units in the region. The song debuted at number three on the New Zealand Singles Chart, charting similarly in Australia by reaching position 4 on the ARIA Singles Chart, becoming the highest charting track from Donda. The song was also a top five hit in Norway and Denmark, peaking at numbers three and five on the Topp 20 Singles and Danish Top 40 charts, respectively. It entered the UK Singles Chart at number seven, standing as the highest of West's three entries from the album. On April 29, 2022, "Hurricane" was certified silver by the British Phonographic Industry (BPI) for pushing 200,000 units in the United Kingdom. As well as the UK, it charted at number seven on both the Icelandic Singles Chart and Irish Singles Chart. The song reached numbers eight and nine on the Swedish Singles Chart and Swiss Singles Chart, respectively. "Hurricane" also entered the top 20 in Finland, Greece, Lithuania, Portugal, India, and Slovakia, while it peaked at number five on the Billboard Global 200.

== Lawsuit ==
On July 17, 2024, Artist Revenue Advocates (ARA) filed a lawsuit against West on behalf of Khalil Abdul-Rahman Hazzard, Sam Barsh, Dan Seeff, and Josh Mease in a Los Angeles Court for copyright infringement. The lawsuit cited usage of elements from "MSD PT2" on "Hurricane" and fellow Donda track "Moon"; the work was recorded by the four musicians for a composer pack and offered for purchase in 2018. West requested permission for usage and ARA refused to give him a license, accusing him of "blatant brazenness" for crediting Hazzard under his stage name of DJ Khalil on the tracks regardless; DJ Khalil and other artists had responded positively to West's use of "MSD PT2", though the ARA argued this as invalid since composition rights were never granted through written contract. Attorneys for ARA issued a statement that the lawsuit focuses on "the rights of artists, musicians, and songwriters" for determining the publishing and usage of their works. They continued that "intellectual property owners" should have a decision in exploitation of their material and the ability to "prevent shameless infringers from simply stealing". The four musicians had unsuccessfully attempted for the three years after the release of "Hurricane" and "Moon" to collect their share of the profits; listening events where the songs were played had earned US$14 million and they had earned US$15 million in streaming revenue by March 1, 2024. The lawsuit identified its defendants as West, Universal Music Group, GOOD Music, and Yeezy LLC, among others, requesting for a court decision over copyright infringement, damages, an award of costs, and any further relief.

On February 26, 2026, the judge presiding over the case dropped the majority of copyright infringement claims against West, as both the ARA's musicology expert and sample-detection tests showed that no direct audio samples of "MSD PT2" were used in the final versions of "Hurricane and "Moon"; ARA continued the case under the pretense that the song's September 2018 demos (referred to in filings as "80 Degrees") and the first listening party version of the song (which contained samples of "MSD PT2") had been commercialized through West's deals with Apple Music and other partners to stream the listening party events. West testified in court on May 6, and was subsequently made to pay US$438,000 in damages for the listening party usage of "MSD PT 2".

== Credits and personnel ==
Credits adapted from Tidal.

- Kanye West – vocals, production, songwriter
- The Weeknd – vocals, songwriter
- Lil Baby – featured vocals, songwriter
- KayCyy Pluto – additional vocals, songwriter
- Sunday Service Choir – additional vocals
- Mike Dean – production, songwriter, mix engineering
- BoogzDaBeast – production, songwriter
- DJ Khalil – production, songwriter
- Ronny J – production, songwriter
- Cirkut – co-production, songwriter
- Ojivolta – co-production, songwriter
- Nascent – additional production, songwriter
- 88-Keys – additional production, songwriter
- Jason White – vocal production
- Nikki Grier – vocal production
- Irko – master engineering, mix engineering
- Sean Solymar – mix assistance
- Tommy Rush – mix assistance
- Al Be Back – songwriter
- Cailin Russo – songwriter
- Consequence – songwriter
- Cyhi the Prynce – songwriter
- Daniel Seeff – songwriter
- Digital Nas – songwriter
- Josh Mease – songwriter
- Malik Yusef – songwriter
- Orlando Wilder – songwriter
- Sam Barsh – songwriter
- Tobias Smith – songwriter
- Alejandro Rodriguez-Dawsøn – record engineering
- Devon Wilson – record engineering
- Jesse Ray Ernster – record engineering
- Josh Berg – record engineering
- Kyle Fitzgibbons – record engineering
- Mikalai Skrobat – record engineering
- Reno Reagan – record engineering
- Roark Bailey – record engineering
- Shane Fitzgibbon – record engineering
- Shin Kamiyama – record engineering
- Zack Djurich – record engineering
- Louis Bell – vocal editing
- Patrick Hundley – vocal editing
- Todd Bergman – vocal editing

== Charts ==
=== Weekly charts ===
Weekly chart performance for "Hurricane"
Chart (2021)	Peak position
Australia (ARIA)	4
Austria (Ö3 Austria Top 40)	23
Canada Hot 100 (Billboard)	4
Czech Republic Singles Digital (ČNS IFPI)	31
Denmark (Tracklisten)	5
Finland (Suomen virallinen lista)	13
France (SNEP)	41
Global 200 (Billboard)	5
Germany (GfK)	37
Greece International (IFPI)	14
Hungary (Stream Top 40)	29
Iceland (Tónlistinn)	7
India International Singles (IMI)	17
Ireland (IRMA)	7
Italy (FIMI)	49
Lithuania (AGATA)	14
Netherlands (Single Top 100)	28
New Zealand (Recorded Music NZ)	3
Norway (VG-lista)	3
Portugal (AFP)	14
Singapore (RIAS)	26
Slovakia Singles Digital (ČNS IFPI)	18
South Africa (TOSAC)	1
Sweden (Sverigetopplistan)	8
Switzerland (Schweizer Hitparade)	9
UK Singles (Official Charts)	7
UK Hip Hop/R&B (Official Charts)	2
US Billboard Hot 100	6
US Hot Christian Songs (Billboard)	1
US Gospel Songs (Billboard)	1
US Hot R&B/Hip-Hop Songs (Billboard)	1
US Pop Airplay (Billboard)	40
US Rhythmic Airplay (Billboard)	9
US Rolling Stone Top 100	1

=== Monthly charts ===
Monthly chart performance for "Hurricane"
Chart (August 2021)	Peak position
Greece International Digital Singles (IFPI)	43

=== Year-end charts ===
2021 year-end chart performance for "Hurricane"
Chart (2021)	Position
US Christian Songs (Billboard)	2
US Gospel Songs (Billboard)	1
US Hot R&B/Hip-Hop Songs (Billboard)	55

== Certifications ==
Certifications for "Hurricane"
Region	Certification	Certified units/sales
Canada (Music Canada)	Platinum	80,000^{‡}
Denmark (IFPI Danmark)	Gold	45,000^{‡}
New Zealand (RMNZ)	Platinum	30,000^{‡}
United Kingdom (BPI)	Silver	200,000^{‡}
United States (RIAA)	2× Platinum	2,000,000^{‡}
^{‡} Sales+streaming figures based on certification alone.
