= Over and Over (Erin Bode album) =

Studio album by Erin Bode
- Released: January 31, 2006
- Recorded: May 19–May 21, 2005
- Genre: Jazz
- Label: Maxjazz
- Producer: Katsuhiko Naito

Erin Bode chronology
| Don't Take Your Time (2004) | Over and Over (2006) |

Over and Over is the second studio album released by jazz singer Erin Bode. It was recorded over three days in mid-May 2005 and released on January 31, 2006 by the label Maxjazz. This album, more than her first, sees Bode being compared to jazz vocalist Norah Jones.

This is the first album that contains songs almost exclusively penned by Bode and her collaborator, pianist Adam Maness. The three exceptions are two pop covers (Paul Simon's "Graceland," Simply Red's "Holding Back the Years") and a jazz standard ("Alone Together").

== Reception ==
Professional ratings
Review scores
| Source | Rating |
|---|---|
| AllMusic | 4/5 stars |

Reviews of the album, mainly grounded in the jazz community, have been positive. George Graham, founder of WVIA-FM 88.9 and jazz expert, calls the album "a more rewarding recording that not only highlights a charming voice, but also gives us worthwhile new songs, and creative, but understated arrangements." Allaboutjazz.com (AAJ) calls Bode "a sorceress of female jazz vocals" with "superior songwriting talent." Allmusic (AMG) gave the album four out of five stars, calling it a "quiet, but engrossing album."

Particular interest focused on the groups' cover of Simon's "Graceland". Jim Newsom of PortFolio Weekly called it "a rich reinvention" and AMG reviewer Stewart Mason described the song as being "transformed from the South African country ramble into something closer to Joni Mitchell's late-'70s fusion period". AAJ reviewer C. Michael Bailey also paralleled the tune with Mitchell and called it "an offbeat, off-time jazz ballad" Graham said that Bode's "Graceland" was "a creative and rather jazzy arrangement...[a] distinctive new spin."

== Track listing ==
1. "Holiday" (Maness) — 4:35
2. "Over and Over" (Bode, Maness) — 4:24
3. "Graceland" (Simon) - 4:58
4. "June" (Bode, Maness) — 4:13
5. "Feet Off the Ground" (Bode, Maness) — 3:17
6. "Long, Long Time" (Bode, Maness) — 5:39
7. "Send Me Up a Sign" (Bode, Maness) — 2:40
8. "St. Louis Song" (Bode, Maness) — 4:05
9. "Perfect World" (Bode, Maness) — 4:35
10. "Something More" (Bode, Maness) — 3:57
11. "Holding Back the Years" (Hucknall) — 4:08
12. "With the Radio On" (Bode, Maness) — 2:52
13. "Alone Together" (Dietz, Schwartz) — 6:31
14. "Home Again" (Bode, Maness) — 2:23

== Personnel ==
Band:

- Adam Maness — vocals, piano
- Erin Bode — vocals, liner notes
- Syd Rodway — bass
- Chris Higginbottom — drums

Guest performers:

- Seamus Blake — saxophone (tenor)
- Dave Eggar — cello
- Josh Mease — guitar (acoustic), vocals (background)

Production:

- Pressley Jacobs — art Direction, design
- Dena Katz, Jimmy Katz — photography
- Katsuhiko Naito — engineer, mastering, mixing
- Max Ross — assistant engineer

== Charts ==
Album - Billboard

| Year | Chart | Position |
|---|---|---|
| 2006 | Top Jazz Albums | 17 |
