= Bruce Barth =

American jazz pianist and composer (born 1958)

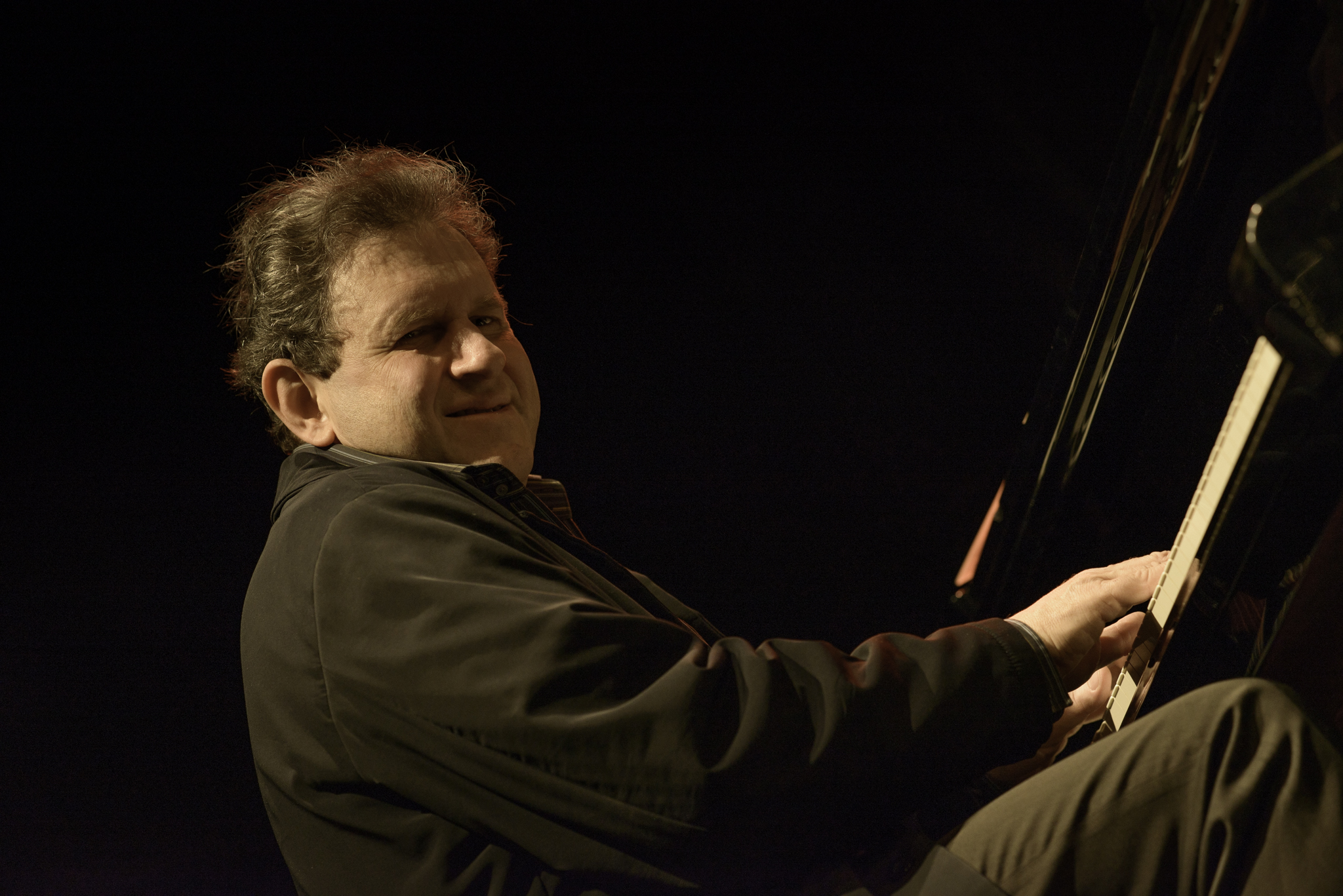

Background information
- Born: September 7, 1958 (age 67); Pasadena, California, U.S.
- Genres: Jazz
- Occupations: Musician, composer, producer
- Instrument: Piano
- Labels: Enja, Fresh Sound, MAXJAZZ
- Website: www.brucebarth.com

Bruce David Barth (born September 7, 1958) is a jazz pianist, composer, and producer.

== Early life ==
Barth was born in Pasadena, California, on September 7, 1958. He started to play the piano around the age of five. He had private jazz lessons with pianist Norman Simmons from 1978 to 1980 and studied at the New England Conservatory of Music in the early 1980s, including under Jaki Byard and George Russell.

== Later life and career ==
Barth moved to New York in 1988, where he was part of groups led by Stanley Turrentine (1989–90) and Terence Blanchard (1990–94). Barth's first album as a leader, In Focus, was released by Enja Records and was based around standards. The follow-up, Morning Call, was also released by Enja and the material was mostly Barth originals. He has led his own small groups since 1993, and has been a freelance pianist and arranger. He was on the teaching faculty of the Berklee College of Music from 1985 to 1988 and Long Island University from 1990. He has also been a record producer, including for vocalist Carla Cook.

== Discography ==
An asterisk (*) indicates that the year is that of release.

=== As leader ===
Year recorded	Title	Label	Personnel/Notes
1993*	In Focus	Enja	Quintet, with Scott Wendholt (trumpet, flugelhorn), Steve Wilson (alto sax, soprano sax), Robert Hurst (bass), Lewis Nash (drums)
1994*	Morning Call	Enja	With Scott Wendholt (trumpet, flugelhorn), Steve Wilson (alto sax, soprano sax), Larry Grenadier (bass), Leon Parker (drums)
1997	Don't Blame Me	Double-Time	Trio, with Ed Howard (bass), Billy Drummond (drums)
1998	Hope Springs Eternal	Double-Time	Quartet, with Steve Wilson (alto sax, soprano sax, flute), Ed Howard (bass), Adam Cruz (drums)
1999	Where Eagles Fly	Fresh Sound	With Sam Newsome (soprano sax), Pat O'Leary (bass), Adam Cruz (drums)
2000	Somehow It's True	Double-Time	With Terell Stafford (trumpet), Adam Kolker (tenor sax, soprano sax), Ugonna Okegwo (bass), Billy Hart (drums), Duduka DaFonseca (percussion)
2000	East and West	Maxjazz	With Terell Stafford (trumpet, flugelhorn), Steve Wilson (alto sax, soprano sax, clarinet), Sam Newsome (soprano sax), Adam Kolker (tenor sax, bass clarinet), Ugonna Okegwo (bass), Al Foster (drums)
2000	American Landscape	Satchmo Jazz	Solo piano
2002	Live at the Village Vanguard	Maxjazz	Trio, with Ugonna Okegwo (bass), Al Foster (drums); in concert
2007*	Live at Maxjazz Cafe del Teatre	Quadrant	With Montez Coleman (drums); DVD
2010*	Home	We Always Swing	With Steve Wilson (alto sax, soprano sax); in concert
2010	Live at Smalls	Smalls Live	Trio, with Vicente Archer (bass), Rudy Royston (drums); in concert
2012	Three Things of Beauty	Savant	Most tracks quartet, with Steve Nelson (vibraphone), Ben Street (bass), Dana Hall (drums); one track duo, with Nelson (vibraphone)
2014*	Daybreak	Savant	With Terell Stafford (trumpet), Steve Nelson (vibraphone), Vicente Archer (bass), Montez Coleman (drums)

=== As sideman ===
Year recorded	Leader	Title	Label
1992	Randy Johnston	Jubilation	Muse
1993	Steve Wilson	Blues for Marcus	Criss Cross
1995	Steve Wilson	Four for Time	Criss Cross
1998	Andy Statman	The Hidden Light	Sony
2005	Terell Stafford	Taking Chances: Live at the Dakota	Maxjazz
2011	Terell Stafford	This Side of Strayhorn	Maxjazz
2015	Terell Stafford	Brotherlee Love: Celebrating Lee Morgan	Capri
