= Josh Mease =

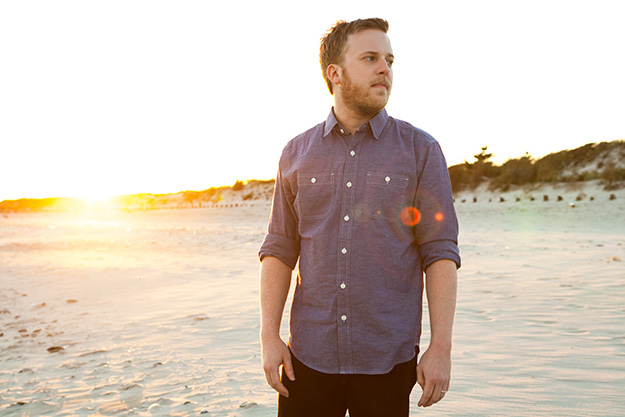

Background information
- Also known as: Lapland
- Born: Houston, Texas
- Genre: indie pop
- Occupations: Songwriter & Musician
- Instrument: Guitar
- Years active: 2003–present
- Website: instagram.com/josh.mease

Josh Mease is an American songwriter living in Los Angeles, CA. He currently performs under the name Lapland.

In 2009, Mease released his debut album, Wilderness, through Frog Stand Records. Mease then released an album in March 2014 under the name Lapland. This self-titled record was released in the UK and Europe by The Lights Label

== Biography ==
Mease was born in Houston, Texas, where he began playing guitar at age 10. He is an alumnus of the High School for the Performing and Visual Arts. He then went on to attend The New School for Jazz and Contemporary Music. While at the New School, Mease shifted his focus away from improvised music towards singing and writing songs.

In 2008, Mease travelled to Denton, Texas, to begin recording a group of songs that he would later finish at home in Brooklyn. These recordings were released in 2009 as Wilderness. Wilderness received positive reviews from NPR, The New York Times, Paste Magazine and Time Out New York. Mease's song “Days Like This” was featured on the finale for season 3 of Showtime's Nurse Jackie.

In 2011, Mease was part of the 713->212 show curated by fellow HSPVA alum Jason Moran. During the show, Moran and other HSPVA alums Robert Glasper, Jamire Williams and Alan Hampton joined Mease to play a short set of his original songs. The New York Times wrote of Mease's performance: “Some very good music went down…And Mr. Mease, who seems to love the intimacy and chord changes in Paul McCartney and Brian Wilson’s work, made his case with music that kept alternately settling you and waking up your ear through harmony.”

In late 2011 Mease began recording a new group of songs at home under the name, Lapland. Lapland's self-titled full-length record was released by the Lights Label on March 3, 2014 in Europe and the UK. It self-released March 4, 2014 in the US.

== Discography ==
- 2009 - Wilderness (Frog Stand Records)
- 2014 - Lapland (The Lights Label)

== Other recordings and appearances ==
- Singer Gretchen Parlato recorded Mease's song "Me and You" for her album The Lost and Found (2011, Obliqsound).
- Jazz guitarist Mike Moreno recorded Mease's "By Myself" for his album First in Mind (2011).
- Mease appeared on Erin Bode's 2006 record Over and Over playing guitar and singing on the track "Send Me Up A Sign".
