= Leslie Pintchik =

- Genres: Jazz, Straight-ahead jazz
- Occupations: Pianist; Composer
- Instrument: Piano
- Labels: Pintch Hard Records
- Website: lesliepintchik.com

Leslie Pintchik is an American jazz pianist and composer. She currently leads a trio with Scott Hardy on bass and Michael Sarin on drums.

== Early life ==
While growing up, Pintchik's father played tenor saxophone as a hobby, but Pintchik was not interested in playing music as a child. It was not until college that Pintchik began playing music. She attended graduate school at Columbia University, where she studied 17th century English literature. As a doctoral candidate, she taught as a teaching assistant. She decided to leave academia and pursue a new career as a pianist and received private instruction from Bruce Barth and began playing public gigs.

== Jazz career ==
Pintchik landed a steady job playing for the brunch crowd at Bradley's in Greenwich Village, in New York City, where she first met Red Mitchell. Mitchell liked what he heard and invited her and Scott Hardy to play with him on stage. Among other venues, Pintchik's trio performs regularly at Jazz at Kitano in New York City.

== Personal life ==
Pintchik is married to musician Scott Hardy. She is known for saying onstage, "He's so good, I had no choice but to marry him!"

== Discography ==
- Prayer for What Remains (2024)
- Same Day Delivery: Leslie Pintchik Trio Live (2019)
- You Eat My Food, You Drink My Wine, You Steal My Girl! (2018)
- True North (2016)
- In The Nature Of Things (2014)
- Leslie Pintchik Quartet Live In Concert (2010)
- We're Here To Listen (2010)
- Quartets (2007)
- So Glad to Be Here (2004)

== Publications ==
- Pintchik, Leslie (July 28, 2010). Need to Know. Jazz Journalists Association. Retrieved October 19, 2014.
- Pintchik, Leslie (August, 2014). Liner notes to Steve Wilson/Lewis Nash CD "Duologue". lesliepintchik.com. Retrieved March 10, 2017.
- Pintchik, Leslie (March, 2014). Author's note to Pintchik's CD "In the Nature of Things". lesliepintchik.com. Retrieved March 10, 2017.
