= Generations (Steve Wilson album) =

Studio album by Steve Wilson
- Released: 1998
- Genre: Jazz
- Label: Stretch
- Producer: Steve Wilson, Laura Hartmann

Steve Wilson chronology
Step Lively (1993)	Generations (1998)	Passages (1999)

Generations is an album by the American musician Steve Wilson, released in 1998. The album title refers to Wilson's desire to record with different generations of jazz musicians. It was his first album for Chick Corea's Stretch Records; Wilson had been a member of Corea's Origin band. Wilson supported the album with a North American tour.

== Production ==
Wilson was backed by drummer Ben Riley, pianist Mulgrew Miller, and bassist Ray Drummond. He chose the musicians due in part to the subtlety of their playing. Wilson wrote five of the album's songs. "Chelsea Bridge" is a version of the Billy Strayhorn composition.

== Critical reception ==
Professional ratings
Review scores
Source	Rating
AllMusic	4/5 stars
Entertainment Weekly	B
The Penguin Guide to Jazz on CD	3/4 stars
The Philadelphia Inquirer	3.5/4 stars

Entertainment Weekly wrote that "a cooking backing unit nudged along by the great drummer Ben Riley keeps Wilson on his toes." The New York Times determined that, "with a light but commanding sound, he plays lines that sound fresh and airily bluesy, unencumbered by the too-common will to overwhelm"; the paper's Peter Watrous listed the album as the 10th best of 1998. The Washington Post noted that "A Joyful Noise" is "a splendid showcase for Wilson's lithe soprano sax and a tune that exudes an insinuating charm even before Miller leisurely and elegantly expands upon the theme."

The Chicago Tribune concluded that "the distinctively keening quality of his tone, inventiveness of his melody lines and high quality of his compositions ... point to an artist of considerable accomplishment and promise." The Richmond Times-Dispatch said that "the saxophonist's technically fluent, crisply lyrical style sets the tone in a varied set." The Toronto Star stated that "Wilson's fluent style fits myriad moods and the musicianship level is high."

AllMusic wrote that Wilson's "mesmerizing soprano sax on 'A Joyful Noise', his spirited flute on the lovely 'Trapaceria', and strong alto sax on his intense 'Sisko' all [merit] strong praise."

== Track listing ==
No.	Title	Length
1.	"Small Portion"
2.	"A Joyful Noise (For JW)"
3.	"Sisko"
4.	"Leanin' & Preenin'"
5.	"Chrysalis"
6.	"Sweet and Lovely"
7.	"Wait"
8.	"Trapacería"
9.	"Chelsea Bridge"
