= Quadrant Records =

Spanish record company

Quadrant Records is an independent record label in Spain.

It has released several records in genres like jazz, folk rock and singer/songwriter. Groups and artists including The Incredible String Band, Mike Heron, Robin Williamson, Clive Palmer, Bruce Barth, Jerry Bergonzi, Sheila Cooper, Rene Marie, Peter King, Cajonmania, Xavier Baro, Michael Lee Wolfe have worked with Quadrant in some of its projects. Quadrant is also an artist booking agency and a concert production company. It promotes and produces the Lleida Jazz Festival each November, with a bill of local and international jazz musicians in concert. The company also produces music festivals around Spain and South Europe.
