= Erin Bode =

American singer from Minnesota

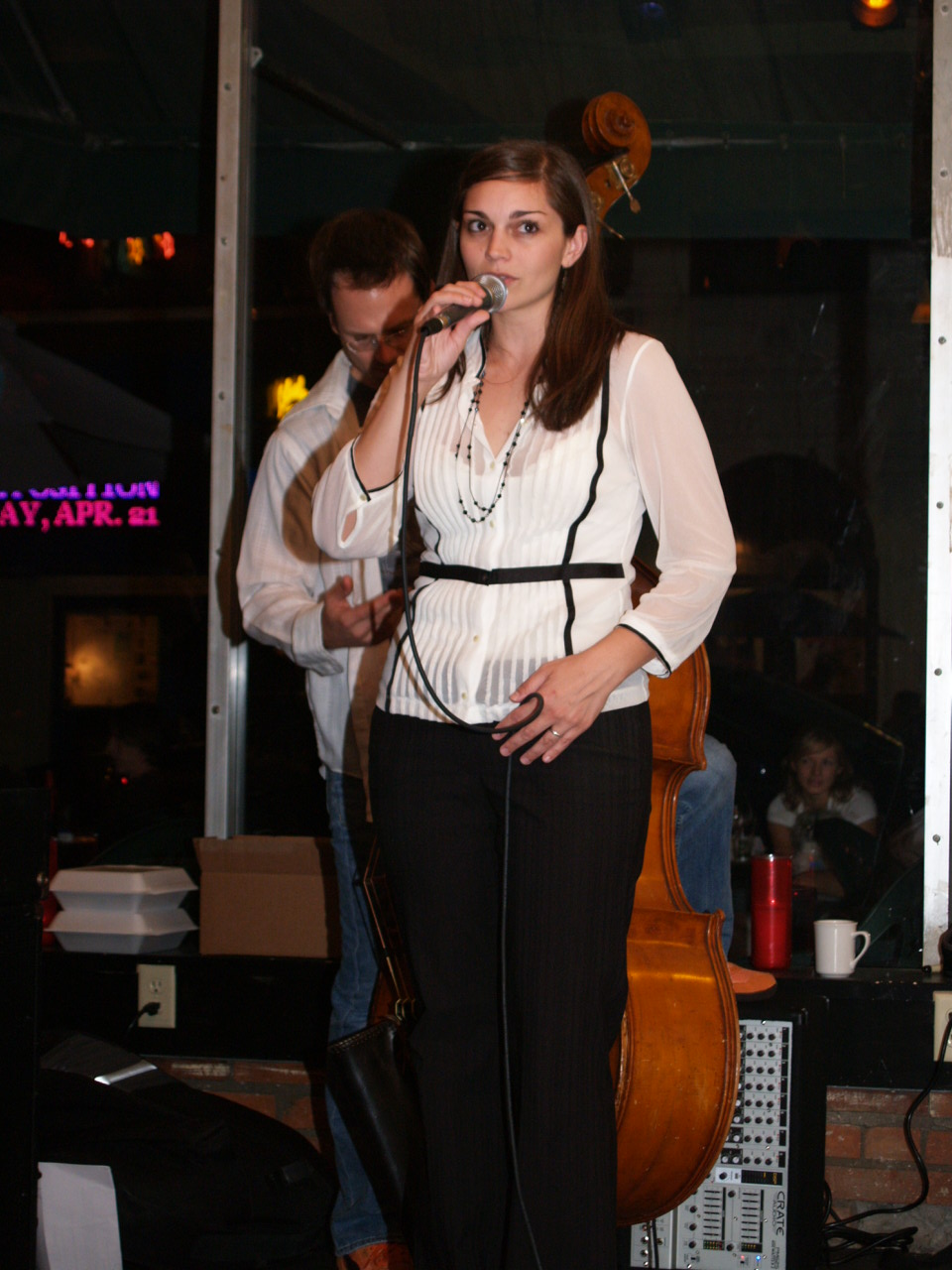
- Bode in April 2006

Background information
- Born: Wayzata, Minnesota
- Genres: Jazz, pop, folk
- Occupation: Singer
- Years active: 2000–present
- Labels: Maxjazz, Native Language, Ropeadope
- Website: www.erinbode.com

Erin Bode is an American singer from Minnesota who describes her music as a combination of jazz, folk, and pop.

== Biography ==
A Minnesota native and the daughter of a Lutheran pastor, Bode was introduced to music by her parents, who emphasized music in daily life and encouraged her to join the church choir. She studied trumpet in high school and was attracted to jazz and big band music. She transferred from University of Minnesota to Webster University in St. Louis, where she studied with a jazz pianist and belonged to a vocal group. In 2001, she produced her debut album, which included a version of Cyndi Lauper's song "Time After Time". Maxjazz, also in St. Louis, released her next album, Don't Take Your Time (2004).

== Discography ==
- Don't Take Your Time (Maxjazz, 2004)
- Over and Over (Maxjazz, 2006)
- The Little Garden (Native Language, 2008)
- A Cold December Night (Native Language, 2008)
- Photograph (Canyon, 2010)
- Be Still My Soul (2013)
- Here and Now (2016)
- YourSong, Volume 1 (2021)
