= American Landscape (Bruce Barth album) =

Recording by Bruce Barth
- Released: 2003
- Recorded: March 2000
- Venues: Auditori Municipal Enric Granados, Lleida, Spain
- Genre: Jazz
- Label: Satchmo Jazz

American Landscape is a solo piano album by Bruce Barth. It was recorded in 2000 and released by Satchmo Jazz Records.

== Recording and music ==
The album of solo piano performances by Bruce Barth was recorded in March 2000, at Auditori Municipal Enric Granados in Lleida, Spain. The performance of "Parisian Thoroughfare" contains Chick Corea influences.

== Release and reception ==
Professional ratings
Review scores
Source	Rating
The Penguin Guide to Jazz	3/4 stars

American Landscape was released by Satchmo Jazz Records in 2003. The Penguin Guide to Jazz wrote that the album "Starts on a high and stays there all the way to the Quaker hymn 'Simply Gifts' [the final track]".

== Track listing ==
1. "Affirmation"
2. "Big Sky"
3. "At the Ranch"
4. "The Dude"
5. "Ghost Town"
6. "Sundown Time"
7. "Riding Off"
8. "I Threw It All Away"
9. "Mama, Who's Been Here"
10. "Parisan Thoroughfare"
11. "Three Types of ESP"
12. "September Song"
13. "Straight, No Chaser"
14. "Simple Gifts (A Shaker Song)"

== Personnel ==
- Bruce Barth – piano
