= Carla Cook =

American jazz singer

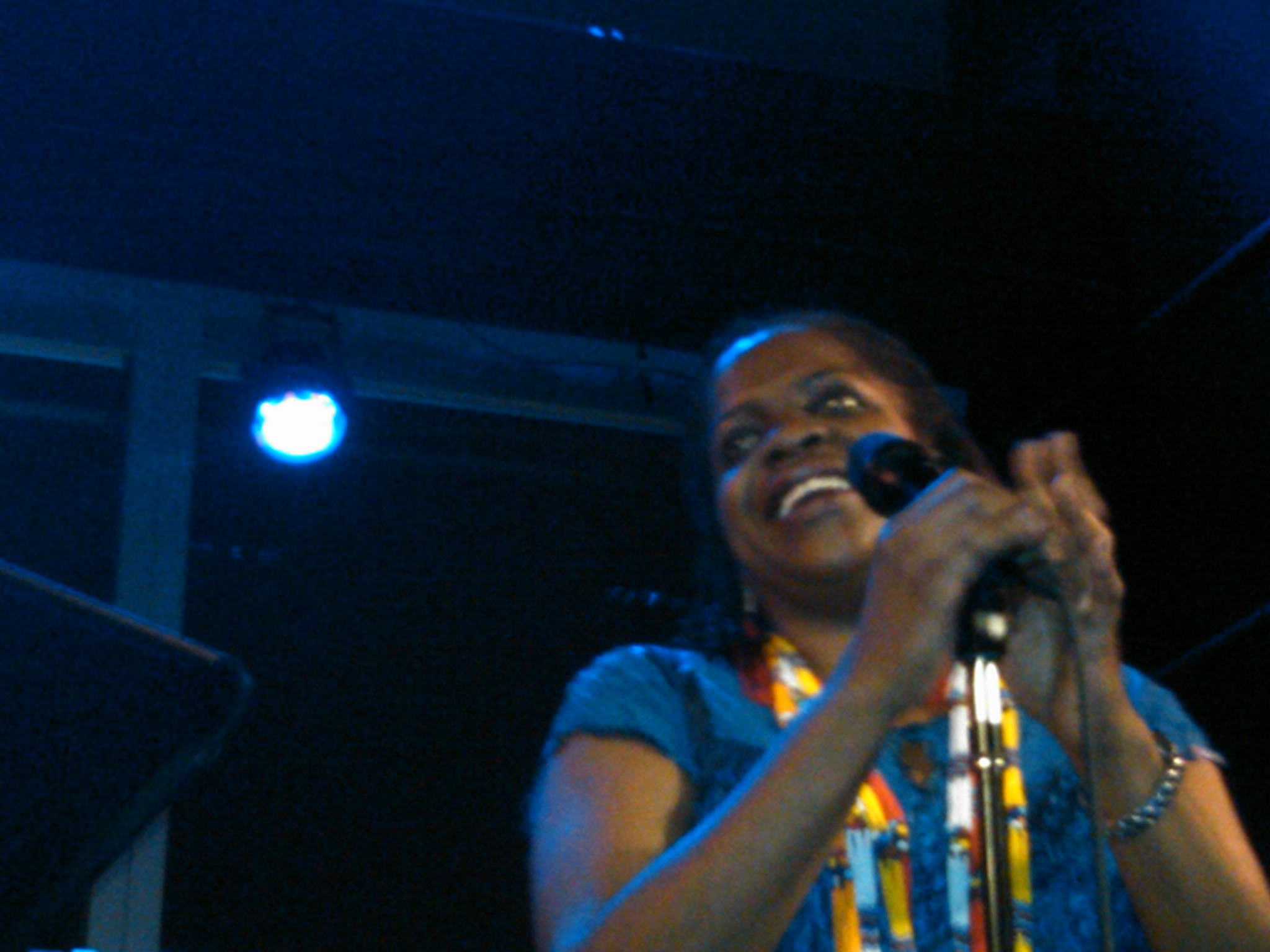
- Cook at Dizzy's Club Coca-Cola, New York City, 2011

Background information
- Genres: Vocal jazz
- Occupation: Singer
- Label: Maxjazz

Carla Cook is an American jazz vocalist.

== Biography ==
Cook was drawn to a life of music at an early age. As a student at Cass Technical High School she played string bass in the school orchestra, studied piano and voice on weekends, and sang in her church's choir. An elder brother introduced her to jazz, Cook chose voice as her instrument of choice, and she became a disciple of jazz icon Eddie Jefferson, founder of a singing technique called "vocalese" where a singer sings lyrics to a famous instrumental solo.

During this time she and close friend Regina Carter formed dreams of becoming jazz musicians; Cook as a singer, and Carter as a violinist. At Carter's urging she applied to and was accepted by Northeastern University in Boston, Massachusetts. While at Northeastern she remained in close contact with Carter (who was studying at the New England Conservatory of Music and met Cyrus Chestnut, a jazz pianist studying at nearby Berklee School of Music. After graduating from Northeastern in 1985 Cook remained in Boston preparing herself for a career singing jazz in New York.

In February 1990 she moved to New York and supported herself as a school teacher and book seller during the day, and singing at night. After five years she traveled to Europe and from 1993 to 1994 Cook served as a guest vocal and ensemble instructor at the Jazzschule in Basel, Switzerland, and Jazz and Rock Schule in Freiburg, Germany. She returned to New York two years later and her work included singing with Lionel Hampton's Orchestra and George Gee's Make Believe Ballroom Orchestra. In 1998 she signed with MaxJazz, a fledgling music label, and that year she released her first CD, It's All About Love, to great acclaim, including a best jazz vocal Grammy nomination. Her second CD, Dem Bones (a tribute to all the trombone players she had worked with in the Lionel Hampton and George Gee groups), released in 2001, was also a success, and received a glowing review from Down Beat magazine, the leading jazz publication. In 2002 she released her CD Simply Natural, which was inspired by her love for the beauty found in nature. In 2011 her rendition of Roberta Flack's "The First Time Ever I Saw Your Face" was featured on jazz percussionist Steve Kroon's CD Without A Doubt.

Cook performs globally both with her own groups, most notably "the Carla Cook Quintet", and as a guest soloist with artists including Eric Reed and old friends Regina Carter and Cyrus Chestnut (both of whom have become luminaries in the jazz world). Her eclectic venues include the digital realm as she performs as the character Teriyaki Yoko in the Sony PlayStation game Um Jammer Lammy, and she has said that it is a dream of hers to appear with her favorite characters on Sesame Street.

Cook was the headliner at the 2018 Central Jazz Festival's September 16, 2018, show in Somerville, New Jersey.

Her songbook includes elements of R&B, European classical, Motown, Blues, and Gospel.

== Discography ==
- It's All About Love (Maxjazz, 1999) “Best Jazz Vocal Performance”

- 1999 Grammy Awards Nominations

- Dem Bones (Maxjazz, 2001) “Dem Bones reminds us of the power that jazz has in its capacity for creating bridges to most other art forms.”

- All About Jazz

- Simply Natural (Maxjazz, 2002)

=== As guest ===
- George Gee, Setting the Pace (GJazz, 2004) “The title of her latest MaxJazz collection reflects Cook’s natural talent while reminding us that she remains delightfully free of artifice or affectation.”

- Jazz Times
