= Maxjazz =

American record label

- Parent company: Mack Avenue Records
- Founded: 1998
- Founder: Richard McDonnell
- Defunct: 2016
- Status: Defunct
- Distributor: Mack Avenue Records
- Genre: Jazz
- Country of origin: U.S.

Maxjazz (corporately styled MAXJAZZ) was an American jazz record label founded in 1998 by investment banker Richard McDonnell. Maxjazz recordings are generally regarded as a "straight-ahead" acoustic style of jazz. It was based in St. Louis, Missouri. In 2016, Maxjazz was bought by Mack Avenue Records.

== Recording artists ==
- Claudia Acuña
- Bruce Barth
- Erin Bode
- LaVerne Butler
- Carla Cook
- Emanuele Cisi
- Dena DeRose
- Asa Harris
- Christine Hitt
- Geoffrey Keezer
- Nancy King
- Frank LoCrasto
- Romero Lubambo
- Russell Malone
- Phillip Manuel
- René Marie
- Peter Martin
- Rebecca Martin
- Cassandre McKinley
- Mulgrew Miller
- Ben Paterson
- Jeb Patton
- Jeremy Pelt
- John Proulx
- Eric Reed
- Mary Stallings
- Terell Stafford
- Trio Da Paz & Joe Locke
- Manuel Valera
- Patti Wicks
- Jack Wilkins
- Jessica Williams
- Steve Wilson
- Ben Wolfe
- Denny Zeitlin
