= Grammy Award for Best Jazz Vocal Album =

Music award

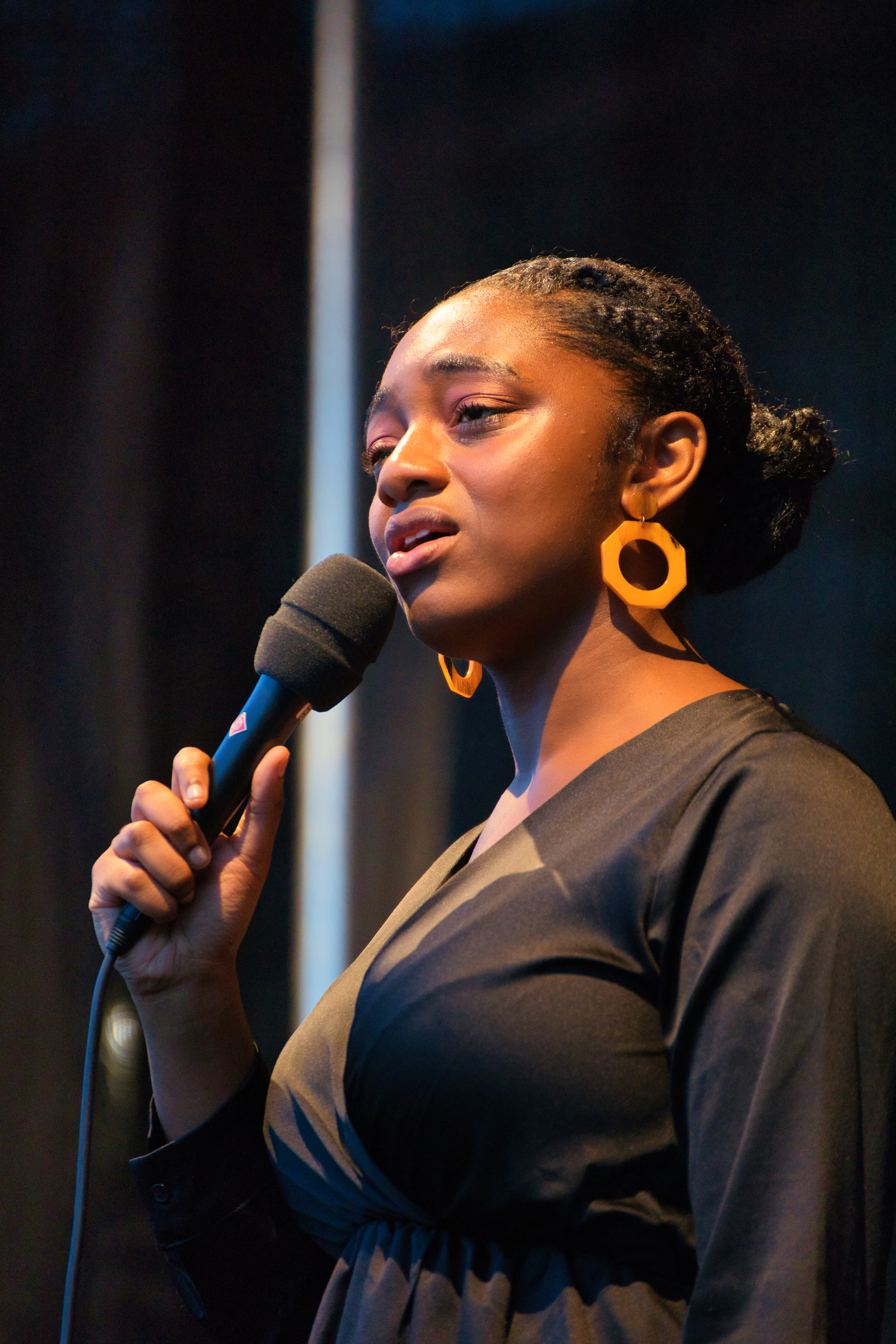
- Portrait by Samara Joy is the most recent recipient.
- Awarded for: Quality performances in the vocal jazz music genre
- Country: United States
- Presented by: National Academy of Recording Arts and Sciences
- First award: 1977
- Currently held by: Samara Joy – Portrait (2026)
- Website: grammy.com

The Grammy Award for Best Jazz Vocal Album is an award presented at the Grammy Awards, a ceremony that was established in 1958 and originally called the Gramophone Awards, to recording artists for quality works (songs or albums) in the vocal jazz music genre. Awards in several categories are presented at the ceremony annually by the National Academy of Recording Arts and Sciences of the United States to "honor artistic achievement, technical proficiency and overall excellence in the recording industry, without regard to album sales or chart position".

== History ==
Until 2001 this award was titled the Grammy Award for Best Jazz Vocal Performance. From 1981 to 1991 (except for 1985) this category was presented as separate awards for Best Jazz Vocal Performance, Female and Best Jazz Vocal Performance, Male.

Since 2001, only the performing artist has been regarded a nominee. For a winning album, the producer(s) and engineer(s)/mixer(s) also receive a Grammy statuette.

Years reflect the year in which the Grammy Awards were presented, for works released in the previous year.

== Recipients ==
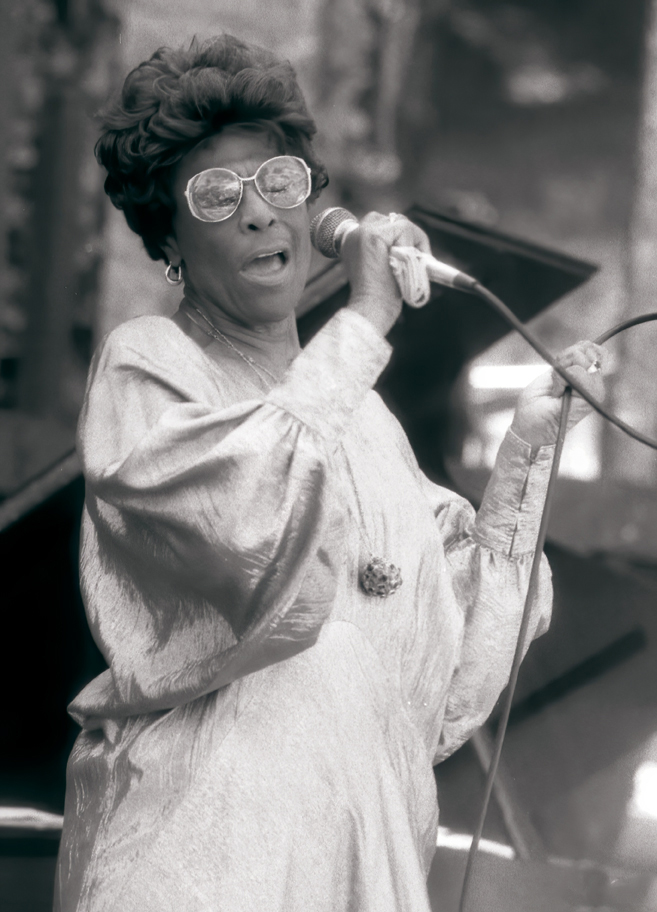
Two-time winner Ella Fitzgerald.

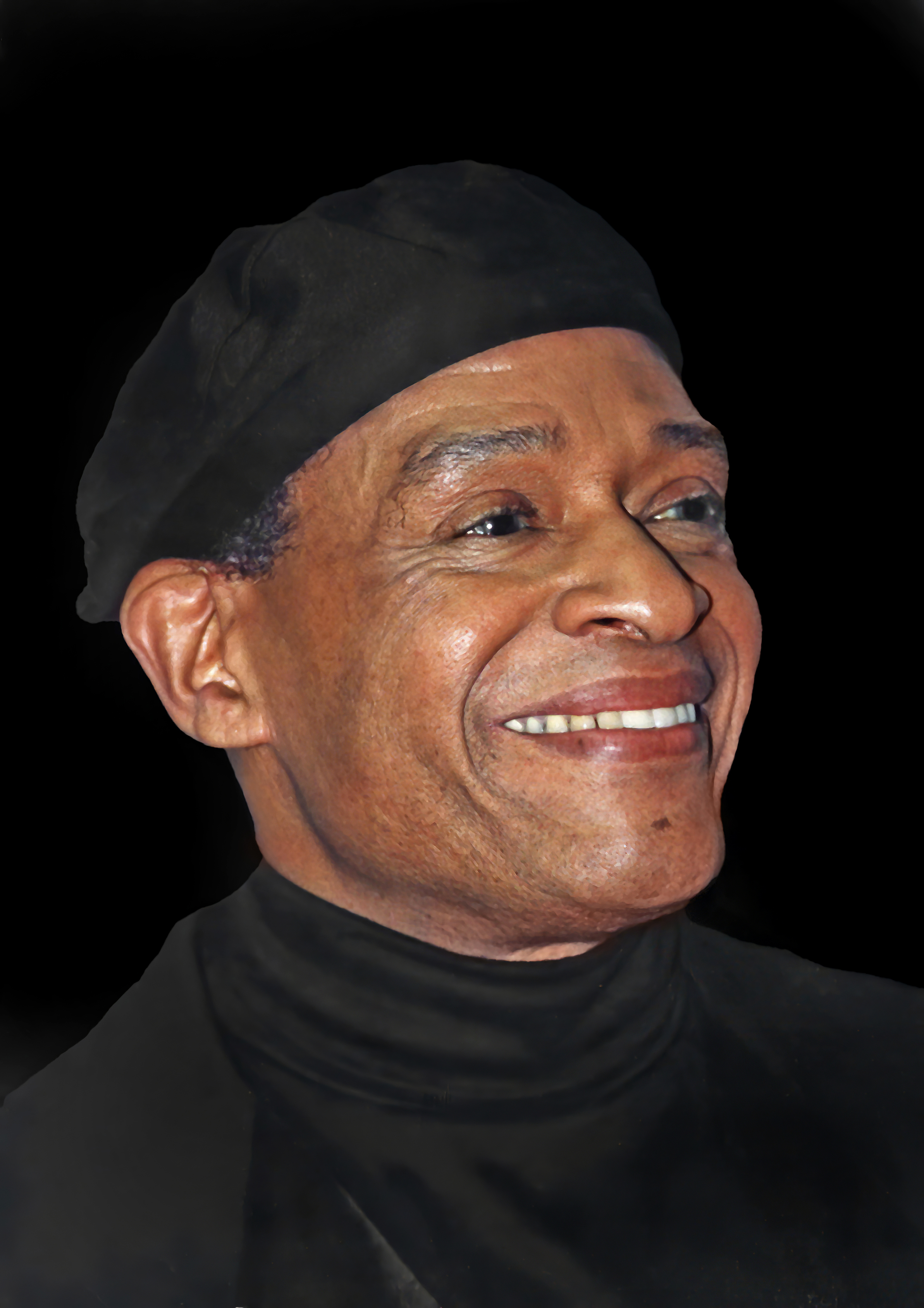
Two-time winner Al Jarreau.

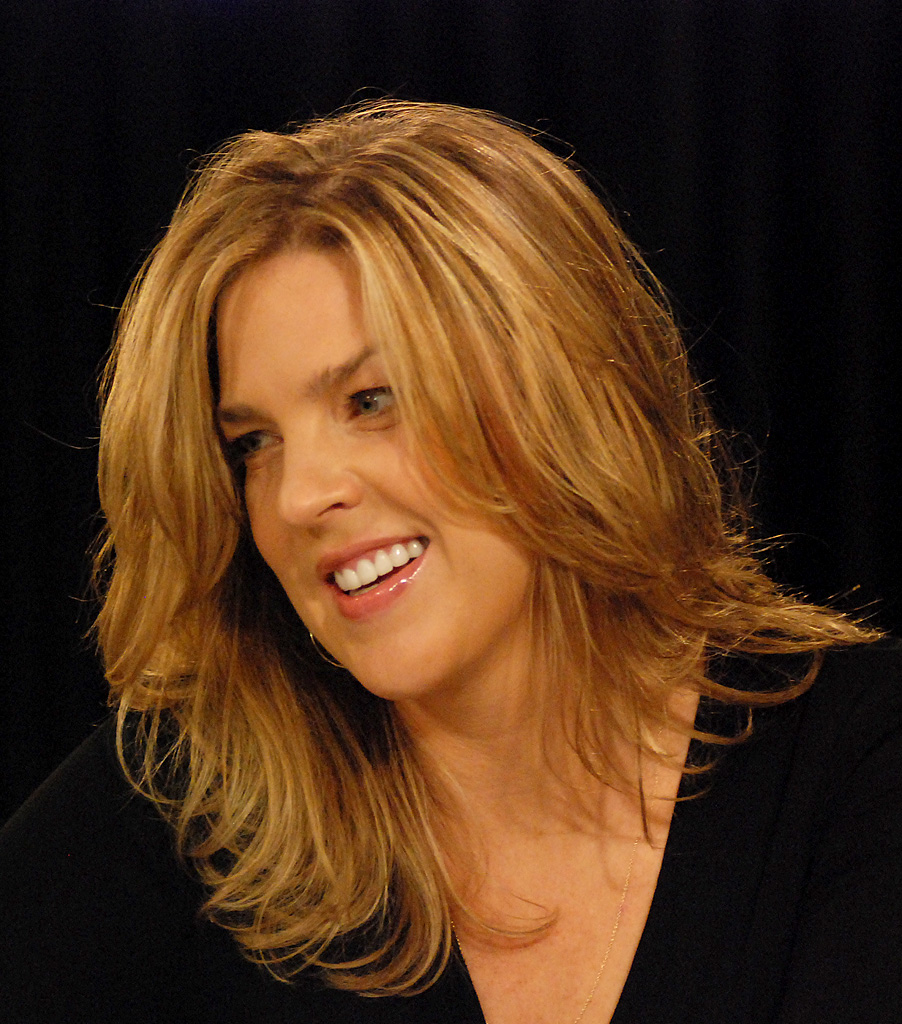
Two-time winner Diana Krall.

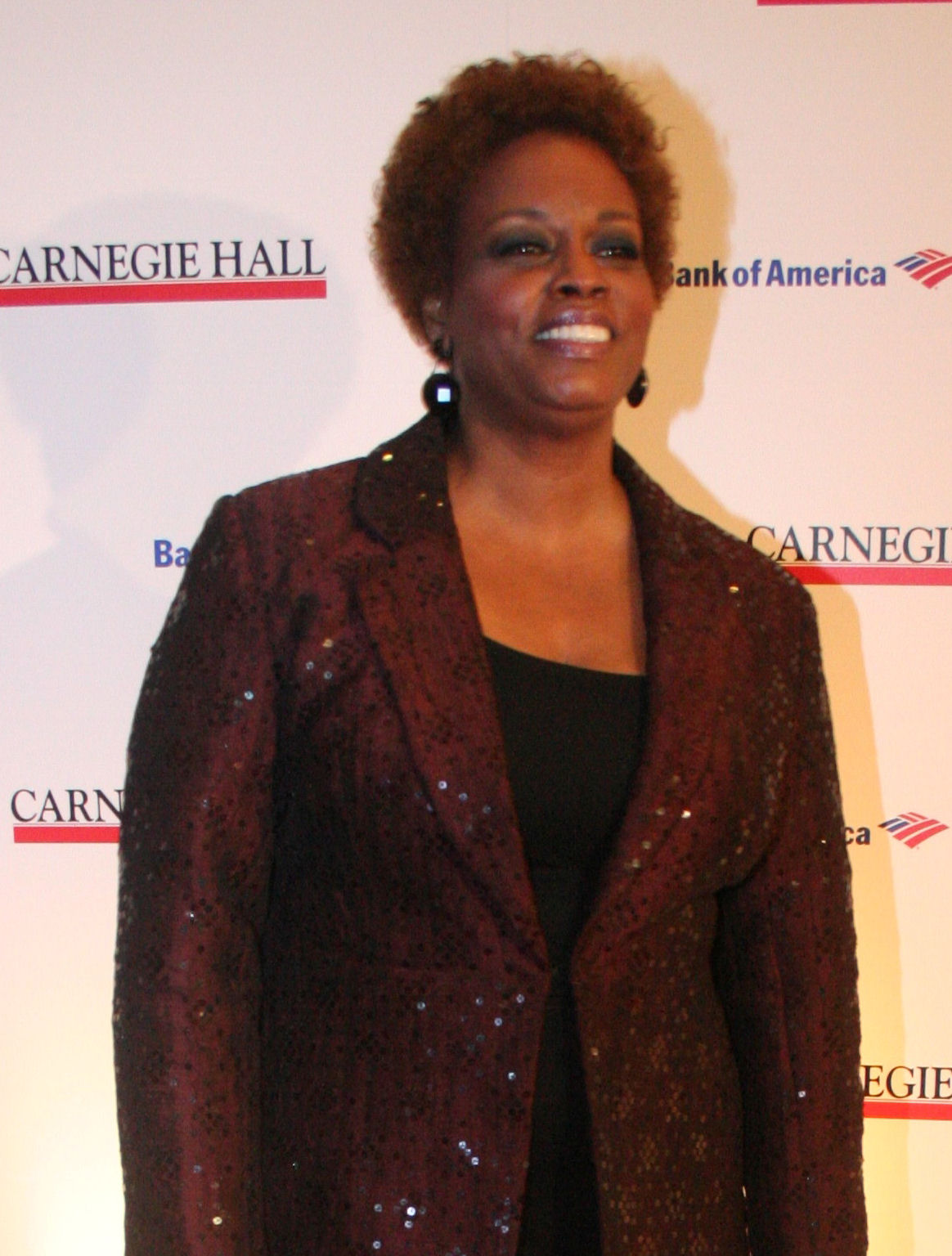
Five-time winner Dianne Reeves.

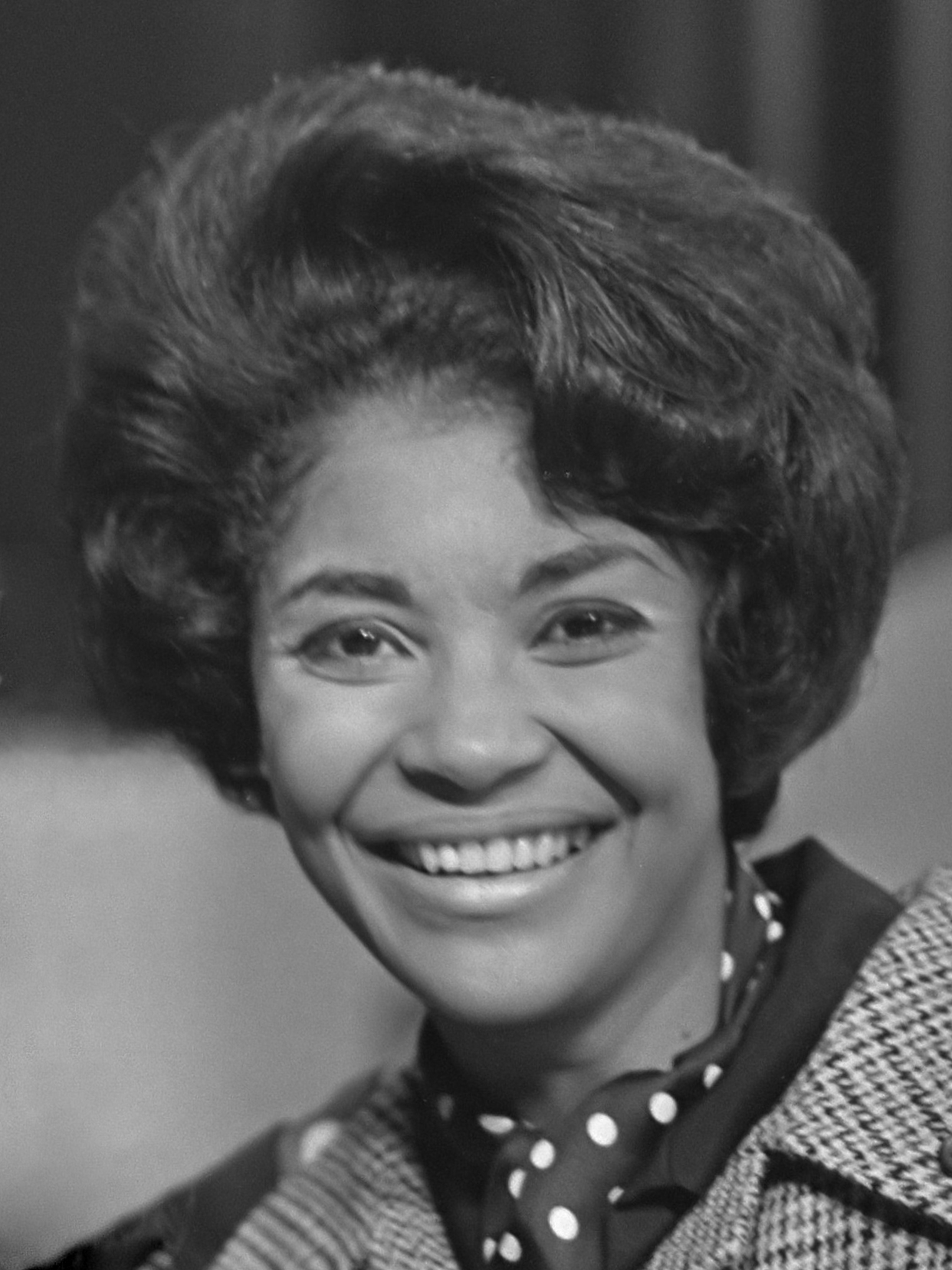
Two-time winner Nancy Wilson.

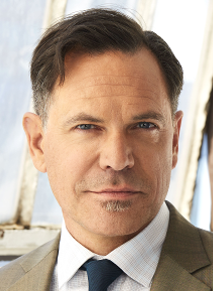
Two-time winner Kurt Elling.

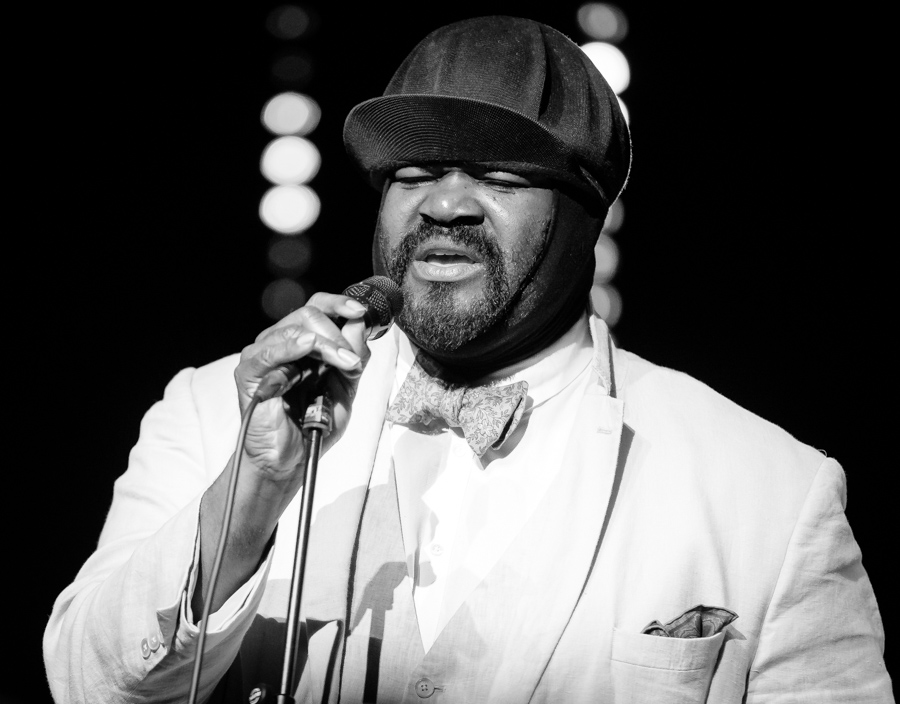
Two-time winner Gregory Porter.

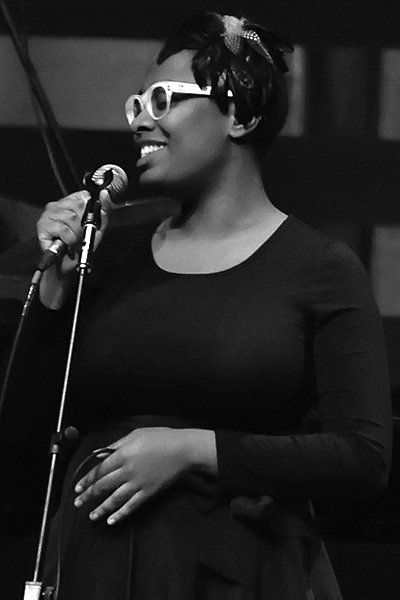
Three-time winner Cécile McLorin Salvant.

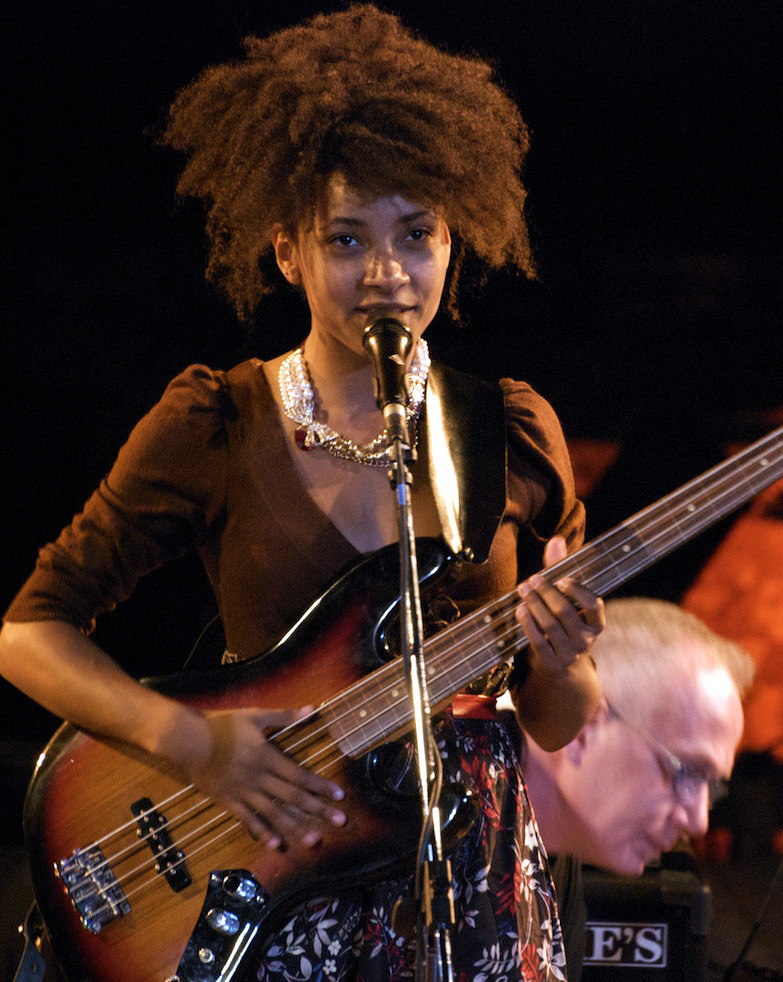
Three-time winner Esperanza Spalding.

=== 1970s ===
Year	Work	Artist
1977	Fitzgerald and Pass... Again	Ella Fitzgerald
1977	More Sarah Vaughan Live in Japan	Sarah Vaughan
1977	Porgy and Bess	Ray Charles and Cleo Laine
1977	Quire	Quire
1977	Where Is Love?	Irene Kral
1978	Look to the Rainbow	Al Jarreau
1978	Amoroso	João Gilberto
1978	Carmen McRae at The Great American Music Hall	Carmen McRae
1978	Helen Merrill/John Lewis	Helen Merrill
1978	Kral Space	Irene Kral
1979	All Fly Home	Al Jarreau
1979	Gentle Rain	Irene Kral
1979	How Long Has This Been Going On	Sarah Vaughan
1979	The Main Man	Eddie Jefferson
1979	Together Again: For the First Time	Mel Tormé
1979	True to Life	Ray Charles

=== 1980s ===
Year	Work	Artist
1980	Fine and Mellow	Ella Fitzgerald
1980	I Love Brazil!	Sarah Vaughan
1980	The Live-Liest	Eddie Jefferson
1980	Prez and Joe	Joe Williams
1980	Sneakin' Around	Helen Humes
1985	Nothin' but the Blues	Joe Williams
1985	An Evening at Charlie's	Mel Tormé
1985	Harlem Butterfly	Lorez Alexandria
1985	Ridin' High	Sue Raney
1985	You're Lookin' at Me	Carmen McRae

=== 1990s ===
Year	Work	Artist
1992	He Is Christmas	Take 6
1992	"Ellington Medley"	Mel Tormé
1992	"Long 'Bout Midnight"	Natalie Cole
1992	The Offbeat of Avenues	The Manhattan Transfer
1992	You Won't Forget Me	Shirley Horn
1993	"Round Midnight"	Bobby McFerrin
1993	All the Way	Jimmy Scott
1993	Here's to Life	Shirley Horn
1993	"I'm Always Chasing Rainbows"	Take 6
1993	You Gotta Pay the Band	Abbey Lincoln
1994	Take a Look	Natalie Cole
1994	Light Out of Darkness	Shirley Horn
1994	Now and Then	Ernestine Anderson
1994	"The Pink Panther Theme"	Bobby McFerrin
1994	Swing That Music	Bobby Short with Alden Barrett Quintet
1995	Mystery Lady: Songs of Billie Holiday	Etta James
1995	Blue Light 'til Dawn	Cassandra Wilson
1995	I Love You, Paris	Shirley Horn
1995	Keeping Tradition	Dee Dee Bridgewater
1995	We'll Be Together Again	Lena Horne
1996	An Evening with Lena Horne	Lena Horne
1996	Close Your Eyes	Kurt Elling
1996	Love and Peace: A Tribute to Horace Silver	Dee Dee Bridgewater
1996	Quiet After the Storm	Dianne Reeves
1996	A Turtle's Dream	Abbey Lincoln
1997	New Moon Daughter	Cassandra Wilson
1997	All for You	Diana Krall
1997	Blues, Dues and Love News	Ernestine Anderson
1997	The Main Ingredient	Shirley Horn
1997	Shaking Free	Nnenna Freelon
1998	Dear Ella	Dee Dee Bridgewater
1998	Love Scenes	Diana Krall
1998	Loving You	Shirley Horn
1998	The Messenger	Kurt Elling
1998	Song for the Geese	Mark Murphy
1999	I Remember Miles	Shirley Horn
1999	Maiden Voyage	Nnenna Freelon
1999	My Buddy: Etta Jones Sings the Songs of Buddy Johnson	Etta Jones
1999	That Day...	Dianne Reeves
1999	This Time It's Love	Kurt Elling

=== 2000s ===
Year	Work	Artist
2000	When I Look in Your Eyes	Diana Krall
2000	Bridges	Dianne Reeves
2000	Heart of a Woman	Etta James
2000	It's All About Love	Carla Cook
2000	Traveling Miles	Cassandra Wilson
2001	In the Moment — Live in Concert	Dianne Reeves
2001	Live at Yoshi's	Dee Dee Bridgewater
2001	Live in Chicago	Kurt Elling
2001	Merry-Go-Round	Freddy Cole
2001	Soulcall	Nnenna Freelon
2002	The Calling	Dianne Reeves
2002	Ballads: Remembering John Coltrane	Karrin Allyson
2002	Flirting with Twilight	Kurt Elling
2002	The Mose Chronicles: Live in London, Vol. 1	Mose Allison
2002	You're My Thrill	Shirley Horn
2003	Live in Paris	Diana Krall
2003	Ask a Woman Who Knows	Natalie Cole
2003	Brazilian Duos	Luciana Souza
2003	Etta Jones Sings Lady Day	Etta Jones
2003	For Ella	Patti Austin
2004	A Little Moonlight	Dianne Reeves
2004	Man in the Air	Kurt Elling
2004	May the Music Never End	Shirley Horn
2004	Nature Boy: The Standards Album	Aaron Neville
2004	North and South	Luciana Souza
2005	R.S.V.P. (Rare Songs, Very Personal)	Nancy Wilson
2005	Accentuate the Positive	Al Jarreau
2005	American Song	Andy Bey
2005	The Dana Owens Album	Queen Latifah
2005	Twentysomething	Jamie Cullum
2006	Good Night, and Good Luck	Dianne Reeves
2006	Blueprint of a Lady: Sketches of Billie Holiday	Nnenna Freelon
2006	Duos II	Luciana Souza
2006	I'm with the Band	Tierney Sutton
2006	J'ai deux amours	Dee Dee Bridgewater
2007	Turned to Blue	Nancy Wilson
2007	Easy to Love	Roberta Gambarini
2007	Footprints	Karrin Allyson
2007	From This Moment On	Diana Krall
2007	Live at Jazz Standard with Fred Hersch	Nancy King
2008	Avant Gershwin	Patti Austin
2008	Music Maestro Please	Freddy Cole
2008	Nightmoves	Kurt Elling
2008	On the Other Side	Tierney Sutton
2008	Red Earth	Dee Dee Bridgewater
2009	Loverly	Cassandra Wilson
2009	Breakfast on the Morning Tram	Stacey Kent
2009	Distances	Norma Winstone
2009	If Less Is More...Nothing Is Everything	Kate McGarry
2009	Imagina: Songs of Brazil	Karrin Allyson

=== 2010s ===
Year	Work	Artist
2010	Dedicated to You: Kurt Elling Sings the Music of Coltrane and Hartman	Kurt Elling
2010	Desire	Tierney Sutton
2010	No Regrets	Randy Crawford and Joe Sample
2010	So in Love	Roberta Gambarini
2010	Tide	Luciana Souza
2011	Eleanora Fagan (1915–1959): To Billie with Love from Dee Dee	Dee Dee Bridgewater
2011	Ages	Lorraine Feather
2011	Freddy Cole Sings Mr. B	Freddy Cole
2011	Water	Gregory Porter
2011	When Lights Are Low	Denise Donatelli
2012	The Mosaic Project	Terri Lyne Carrington & Various Artists
2012	American Road	Tierney Sutton
2012	The Gate	Kurt Elling
2012	The Music of Randy Newman	Roseanna Vitro
2012	'Round Midnight	Karrin Allyson
2013	Radio Music Society	Esperanza Spalding
2013	1619 Broadway: The Brill Building Project	Kurt Elling
2013	The Book of Chet	Luciana Souza
2013	Live	Al Jarreau and Metropole Orchestra
2013	Soul Shadows	Denise Donatelli
2014	Liquid Spirit	Gregory Porter
2014	After Blue	Tierney Sutton
2014	Attachments	Lorraine Feather
2014	WomanChild	Cécile McLorin Salvant
2014	The World According to Andy Bey	Andy Bey
2015	Beautiful Life	Dianne Reeves
2015	I Wanna Be Evil: With Love to Eartha Kitt	René Marie
2015	Live in NYC	Gretchen Parlato
2015	Map to the Treasure: Reimagining Laura Nyro	Billy Childs and Various Artists
2015	Paris Sessions	Tierney Sutton
2016	For One to Love	Cécile McLorin Salvant
2016	Find a Heart	Denise Donatelli
2016	Flirting with Disaster	Lorraine Feather
2016	Jamison	Jamison Ross
2016	Many a New Day: Karrin Allyson Sings Rodgers & Hammerstein	Karrin Allyson
2017	Take Me to the Alley	Gregory Porter
2017	Harlem on My Mind	Catherine Russell
2017	Sound of Red	René Marie
2017	The Sting Variations	The Tierney Sutton Band
2017	Upward Spiral	Branford Marsalis Quartet with Kurt Elling
2018	Dreams and Daggers	Cécile McLorin Salvant
2018	Bad Ass and Blind	Raul Midón
2018	The Journey	The Baylor Project
2018	Porter Plays Porter	Randy Porter Trio with Nancy King
2018	A Social Call	Jazzmeia Horn
2019	The Window	Cécile McLorin Salvant
2019	If You Really Want	Raul Midón with the Metropole Orkest conducted by Vince Mendoza
2019	My Mood Is You	Freddy Cole
2019	The Questions	Kurt Elling
2019	The Subject Tonight Is Love	Kate McGarry, Keith Ganz and Gary Versace

=== 2020s ===
Year	Work	Artist
2020	12 Little Spells	Esperanza Spalding
2020	Alone Together	Catherine Russell
2020	Love & Liberation	Jazzmeia Horn
2020	ScreenPlay	The Tierney Sutton Band
2020	Thirsty Ghost	Sara Gazarek
2021	Secrets Are the Best Stories	Kurt Elling featuring Danilo Pérez
2021	Holy Room: Live at Alte Oper	Somi with the Frankfurt Radio Big Band conducted by John Beasley
2021	Modern Ancestors	Carmen Lundy
2021	ONA	Thana Alexa
2021	What's the Hurry	Kenny Washington
2022	Songwrights Apothecary Lab	Esperanza Spalding
2022	Flor	Gretchen Parlato
2022	Generations	The Baylor Project
2022	SuperBlue	Kurt Elling and Charlie Hunter
2022	Time Traveler	Nnenna Freelon
2023	Linger Awhile	Samara Joy
2023	The Evening: Live at APPARATUS	The Baylor Project
2023	Fade to Black	Carmen Lundy
2023	Fifty	The Manhattan Transfer with the WDR Funkhausorchester
2023	Ghost Song	Cécile McLorin Salvant
2024	How Love Begins	Nicole Zuraitis
2024	Alive at the Village Vanguard	Fred Hersch and Esperanza Spalding
2024	For Ella 2	Patti Austin featuring Gordon Goodwin's Big Phat Band
2024	Lean In	Gretchen Parlato and Lionel Loueke
2024	Mélusine	Cécile McLorin Salvant
2025	A Joyful Holiday	Samara Joy
2025	Journey in Black	Christie Dashiell
2025	Milton + Esperanza	Milton Nascimento and Esperanza Spalding
2025	My Ideal	Catherine Russell and Sean Mason
2025	Wildflowers, Vol. 1	Kurt Elling and Sullivan Fortner
2026	Portrait	Samara Joy
2026	Elemental	Dee Dee Bridgewater and Bill Charlap
2026	Fly	Michael Mayo
2026	Live at Vic's Las Vegas	Nicole Zuraitis, Dan Pugach, Tom Scott, Idan Morim, Keyon Harrold and Rachel Eckroth
2026	We Insist 2025!	Terri Lyne Carrington and Christie Dashiell ft. Weedie Braimah, Milena Casado, Morgan Guerin, Simon Moulier and Matthew Stevens
2027	For Dinah	Ledisi
2027	The Wise Ones	Gretchen Parlato
2027	Live at Jazz at Lincoln Center	Catherine Russell
2027	With Every Breath I Take	Cécile McLorin Salvant, Metropole Orkest & Jules Buckley
2027	The Devil I Knew	Nicole Zuraitis

== Artists with multiple wins ==
5 wins

- Dianne Reeves

3 wins

- Cécile McLorin Salvant
- Esperanza Spalding
- Samara Joy

2 wins

- Ella Fitzgerald
- Al Jarreau
- Dee Dee Bridgewater
- Cassandra Wilson
- Kurt Elling
- Diana Krall
- Nancy Wilson
- Gregory Porter

== Artists with multiple nominations ==
15 nominations

- Kurt Elling

9 nominations

- Shirley Horn

8 nominations

- Dianne Reeves
- Tierney Sutton

7 nominations

- Dee Dee Bridgewater

6 nominations

- Cécile McLorin Salvant

5 nominations

- Nnenna Freelon
- Diana Krall
- Karrin Allyson
- Luciana Souza
- Esperanza Spalding

4 nominations

- Al Jarreau
- Cassandra Wilson
- Freddy Cole

3 nominations

- The Baylor Project
- Catherine Russell
- Denise Donatelli
- Gregory Porter
- Gretchen Parlato
- Irene Kral
- Lorraine Feather
- Mel Tormé
- Natalie Cole
- Patti Austin
- Samara Joy
- Sarah Vaughan

2 nominations

- Abbey Lincoln
- Andy Bey
- Bobby McFerrin
- Carmen Lundy
- Carmen McRae
- Eddie Jefferson
- Ella Fitzgerald
- Ernestine Anderson
- Etta James
- Fred Hersch
- Jazzmeia Horn
- Joe Williams
- Kate McGarry
- Lena Horne
- Metropole Orchestra
- Nancy King
- Nancy Wilson
- Raul Midón
- Ray Charles
- René Marie
- Roberta Gambarini
- Take 6
- The Manhattan Transfer
