= Big Noise =

Big Noise or The Big Noise may refer to:

== Comics ==
- Superman/Batman: Big Noise, a comic book by Joe Casey

== Film and TV ==
- The Big Noise (1928 film), an American comedy film directed by Allan Dwan
- The Big Noise (1936 American film), a 1936 United States film directed by Frank McDonald
- The Big Noise (1936 British film), a British comedy film directed by Alex Bryce
- The Big Noise (1944 film), a 1944 American comedy film starring Laurel and Hardy
- The Big Noise (2012 film), an Australian film

== Music ==
=== Albums ===
- Big Noise, album by Man from Delmonte (band) 2000
- Big Noise, album by Eddie from Ohio 1997
- Wynonna & the Big Noise, by Wynonna Judd 2016
- Big Noise (Tiny Masters of Today EP), a 2006 EP by Tiny Masters of Today
- Big Noise from Winnetka, album by Bob Haggart 1962

=== Songs ===
- "Big Noise", song by The Upsetters from The Upsetter 1969 and compilation Return of Django The Best of the Upsetters 2002
- "Big Noise", song by Phil Collins from Buster OST 1988, and album Groovy Kind of Love 1991
- "Big Noise, New York", song by Denise Donatelli from album Find a Heart 2015

=== Other ===
- Big Noise, music firm
- Big Noize, an American rock supergroup, active from 2006–2013
