= Lawrence Leathers =

American drummer (1981–2019)

- Born: November 23, 1981; Lansing, Michigan, U.S.
- Died: June 2, 2019 (aged 37) New York, New York, U.S.
- Genre: Jazz
- Instrument: Percussion

Lawrence "Lo" Leathers (November 23, 1981 – June 2, 2019) was an American jazz drummer.

== Biography ==
Leathers was born in Lansing, Michigan. He began to play professionally at the age of 15, and moved to New York after being accepted at the Juilliard School.

In a 2012 interview with Capsulocity, he noted how early influences from his Michigan childhood led to his becoming a drummer for jazz musicians such as Mulgrew Miller, Wynton Marsalis, Wycliffe Gordon, Cyrus Chestnut and Rodney Whitaker.

Highly in demand as a sideman in NYC, he was featured on nearly 300 concerts at Smalls Jazz Club in the decade leading up to his death, including performances with Ian Hendrickson-Smith, Kirk Lightsey, Sullivan Fortner, Spencer Murphy, Steve Nelson, Philip Harper, Dominick Farinacci, Ryan Kisor, and Johnny O'Neal, as well as a many gigs as a band leader.

He is best known to a global jazz audience for projects stemming from his affiliation with pianist Aaron Diehl, which included Leathers on drums alongside bassist Paul Sikivie, and frequently featured vocalist Cécile McLorin Salvant. He played drums on Salvant's albums, For One to Love (2015) and Dreams and Daggers (2017), both of which won Grammy Awards for Best Jazz Vocal Album, and appears posthumously on her 2023 release Melusine.

== Death ==
Leathers was killed during a domestic dispute with his girlfriend Lisa Harris on June 2, 2019, at his home in The Bronx, New York. Harris and Sterling Aguilar were arrested in connection with his death, with allegations that Harris restrained Leathers and Aguilar punched and choked him.
