= Godwin Louis =

American saxophonist, composer, and arranger

- Born: Harlem, New York City
- Occupation(s): Saxophonist, composer, arranger
- Website: godwinlouis.com

Godwin Louis is a saxophonist, composer, and arranger.

== Early life ==
He was born in Harlem, New York City, to Haitian parents and raised in Bridgeport, Connecticut, and Port-au-Prince, Haiti.

== Career ==
Louis began playing the saxophone at the age of nine. He is a graduate of Berklee College of Music and the Thelonious Monk Institute of Jazz. He currently serves as an assistant professor at Berklee College of Music.

Louis received a Grammy Awards nomination for Best Arrangement, Instruments, and Vocals for his work as arranger on "Fenestra" by Cécile McLorin Salvant. In 2013, he was finalist in the Thelonious Monk International Jazz Saxophone Competition.

Louis has collaborated with Herbie Hancock, Clark Terry, Ron Carter, and Jack DeJohnette. He is also the founder of Experience Ayiti, a nonprofit organization dedicated to promoting cultural exchange and arts education.

== Albums ==
- The Blue Sound of New York (a document by Emanuele Michetti) (2015)
- Global (2019)
- Psalms and Proverbs (2024)

== Awards ==
- Nominated for Grammy
- Jerome Foundation Emerging Artist Grant
- Jazz Gallery's New Works Commission
