= Mélusine (album) =

Studio album by Cécile McLorin Salvant
- Released: March 24, 2023
- Recorded: April 12 and 26, 2022
- Studio: Brooklyn Recording, Brooklyn; The Bunker Studio, Brooklyn
- Genre: Jazz
- Length: 45:07
- Language: French
- Label: Nonesuch
- Producer: Cécile McLorin Salvant; Tom Korkidis

Cécile McLorin Salvant chronology
Ghost Song (2022)	Mélusine (2023)	Oh Snap (2025)

Singles from Mélusine
- 1. "D'un feu secret" Released: January 26, 2023; 2. "Mélusine" Released: March 2, 2023

Mélusine is the seventh solo studio album by American jazz vocalist Cécile McLorin Salvant, released on March 24, 2023, by Nonesuch Records. The album was recorded in April 2022 in Brooklyn, with Salvant and Tom Korkidis producing. It is primarily sung in French, and is a concept album based on the folkloric story of Melusine. It was preceded by two singles.

The album was met with critical acclaim, and was nominated for two Grammy Awards for Best Jazz Vocal Album and Best Arrangement, Instrumental and Vocals for Godwin Louis's arranging of the song "Fenestra".

== Recording and release ==
The album was recorded on April 12 and 26, 2022, at Brooklyn Recording and the Bunker Studio, both in Brooklyn, New York, except for "La route enchantée" which was recorded live. Salvant produced the album with Tom Korkidis, and her band included percussionist Weedie Braimah, pianists Sullivan Fortner and Aaron Diehl, bassists Paul Sikivie and Luques Curtis, drummers Kyle Pool and Obed Calvaire, and saxophonist Godwin Louis. Salvant primarily sang in French, her first language, with other songs in English, Occitan, and Haitian Kreyòl.

The album was first announced on January 26, 2023, with release dates set for March 24 for digital, and May 19 on vinyl, both by Nonesuch Records. The announcement came with the lead single, "D'un feu secret", and an animated music video by Amanda Bonaiuto. "D'un feu secret" ("Of a Secret Fire") is a 1660 composition by Michel Lambert, which Salvant sings "like an early music performer, poised and delicate with feathery ornaments", while Fortner's synthesizer "savor[s] the anachronism". The second single, the title track, was released on March 2.

== Themes ==
The album is named after Melusine, a figure of European folklore detailed by 14th-century French writer Jean d'Arras. Melusine is a woman whose lower body transforms into a snake on Saturdays. She is met by Raymondin and agrees to marry him and make him rich if he promises not to visit her on Saturdays, but when he eventually breaks that promise, she turns into a dragon and flies away. Salvant said she first connected with the story's inclusion of "that alone time, that Room of One's Own, as Virginia Woolf put it, and how difficult it is to find that and protect it", but later also identified with Raymondin's desire to not allow one's partner to have a world outside the relationship.

Salvant also described the album as being about "that feeling of being a hybrid, a mixture of different cultures, which I've experienced not only as the American-born child of two first generation immigrants, but as someone raised in a family that is racially mixed, from several different countries, with different languages spoken in the home."

== Style ==
Unlike traditional opera or musical theatre, where each song advances the main narrative, the songs of Mélusine reflect the emotional temperature of each part of the story. Slate's Fred Kaplan said the album is "as much cabaret, Renaissance, mystical, and folk as it is jazz ... with songs spanning from the 12th century to vaudeville ditties and Broadway showtunes to a few Salvant originals".

== Reception ==
Mélusine ratings
Aggregate scores
Source	Rating
Metacritic	89/100
Review scores
Source	Rating
All About Jazz	4/5 stars
AllMusic	4.5/5 stars
The Arts Desk	5/5 stars
Jazzwise	4/5 stars
Louder Than War	4/5 stars
Mojo	4/5 stars
Tom Hull	B+

According to the review aggregator Metacritic, Mélusine received "universal acclaim" based on a weighted average score of 89 out of 100 from 4 critic scores. All About Jazz's Katchie Cartwright called Mélusine "a wondrous album, top to bottom". Mojo stated that the album "retains the intellectual curiosity of Salvant's jittery, questing catalogue".

Kieron Tyler of The Arts Desk wrote: "Cécile McLorin Salvant is categorised as a jazz artist but the self-produced, Brooklyn-recorded Mélusine is uncategorisable. Notwithstanding the electronica and Kreyòl elements, all that springs to mind as a figurative touchtone is maverick chanson outsider Barbara's 1970 L'aigle noir album. As the comparison indicates, the amazing Mélusine is that remarkable."

=== Awards and nominations ===
Mélusine awards and nominations
Year	Organization	Award	Work	Recipient	Status	Ref.
2024	Grammy Awards	Best Jazz Vocal Album	Mélusine	Salvant	Nominated	
2024	Grammy Awards	Best Arrangement, Instrumental and Vocals	"Fenestra"	Godwin Louis	Nominated	

=== Year-end lists ===
Mélusine on year-end lists
Publication	#	Ref.
AllMusic	—N/a	
Louder Than War	36	
Mojo	67	

== Track listing ==
All tracks are written by Cécile McLorin Salvant except where noted.

Mélusine track listing
No.	Title	Writer(s)	Length
1.	"Est-ce ainsi que les hommes vivent?"	Léo Ferré; Louis Aragon	5:26
2.	"La Route enchantée"	Charles Trenet	5:57
3.	"Il m'a vue nue"	Pierre Chagnon	2:47
4.	"Dites moi que je suis belle"	Anonymous; Eustache Deschamps	2:41
5.	"Doudou"		5:34
6.	"Petite musique terrienne"	Luc Plamondon; Michel Berger	2:20
7.	"Aida"		1:03
8.	"Mélusine"		3:13
9.	"Wedo"		0:58
10.	"D'un feu secret"	Michel Lambert	3:44
11.	"Le temps est assassin"	Véronique Sanson	3:49
12.	"Fenestra"		5:18
13.	"Domna n'almucs"	Iseut de Capio	0:44
14.	"Dame Iseut"	Almucs de Castelnau	1:33
Total length:			45:07

== Personnel ==
=== Musicians ===
- Cécile McLorin Salvant – vocals, synthesizer (7, 9, 13)
- Sullivan Fortner – piano (3, 5, 6, 11, 12), synthesizer (6, 10), kalimba (12), vocals (12), celesta (14)
- Aaron Diehl – piano (1, 2)
- Paul Sikivie – bass (1, 2)
- Kyle Pool – drums (1, 2)
- Lawrence Leathers – drums (2)
- Luques Curtis – bass (3, 5, 12, 14)
- Obed Calvaire – drums (3, 5, 12)
- Godwin Louis – alto saxophone (3, 5), whistle (3), vocals (12)
- Weedie Braimah – percussion (3, 5, 12, 14), djembe (4)
- Daniel Swenberg – nylon-string guitar (8)

=== Technical ===
- Cécile McLorin Salvant – producer, recording engineer (7, 9, 13), programming (7, 9, 13)
- Tom Korkidis – co–producer
- John Davis – mixing engineer, recording engineer (1, 2, 6, 10, 11)
- Andy Taub – recording engineer (3–5, 12, 14)
- Samuel Wahl – assistant recording engineer (3–5, 12, 14)
- Todd Whitelock – recording engineer (8)
- Alex Deturk – mastering engineer
- Godwin Louis – arrangement (3, 5, 12)

== Charts ==
Chart performance for Mélusine
Chart (2023)	Peak position
Portuguese Albums (AFP)	44
UK Jazz & Blues Albums (Official Charts)	9
