= WomanChild =

Studio album by Cécile McLorin Salvant
- Released: May 27, 2013
- Studios: Avatar Studios, NYC
- Genre: Jazz
- Length: 58:48
- Label: Mack Avenue
- Producer: Al Pryor

Cécile McLorin Salvant chronology
Cécile & the Jean-François Bonnel Paris Quintet (2010)	WomanChild (2013)	For One to Love (2015)

Professional ratings
Review scores
Source	Rating
AllMusic	4/5 stars
Jazz Forum	5/5 stars
Jazzwise	4/5 stars
Tom Hull	B+

WomanChild is the second studio album by French-American jazz singer Cécile McLorin Salvant. Mack Avenue released the album on May 27, 2013.

== Background ==
The album marked Salvant's first release following her victory at the 2010 Thelonious Monk International Jazz Competition, and was acclaimed as one of the most significant vocal jazz debuts of its era. The album received a nomination for the Grammy Award for Best Jazz Vocal Album at the 56th Annual Grammy Awards. The album was recorded at the Avatar Studios in New York City.

For WomanChild, Salvant selected songs with a personal connection to her life, choosing material dating from the 19th century through to the 21st. The album features a blend of jazz standards, rediscovered compositions from early African American performers, and also her original material. Salvant also accompanied herself on piano for one track, "Jitterbug Waltz". The title track, an original composition, was described by Salvant as autobiographical while also expressing her view of art as something that should be simultaneously adult and childlike.

== Reception ==
Matt Collar of AllMusic stated: " With WomanChild, Salvant's time has definitely come and despite whatever fears she may have, it's clear she has the talent to go very far indeed." Peter Quinn of Jazzwise wrote: "This recording... is one of the most hotly anticipated releases of the year. And rightly so. WomanChild is a completely self-assured and astonishingly mature statement." Christopher Loudon of JazzTimes mentioned: "She has simply taken the best of the best and synthesized them into a sound that, at once girlish and gutsy, is uniquely her own."

== Track listing ==
No.	Title	Writer(s)	Length
1.	"St. Louis Gal"	J. Russel Robinson	3:01
2.	"I Didn't Know What Time It Was"	Richard Rogers, Lorenz Hart	6:07
3.	"Nobody"	Alex Rogers, Bert Williams	3:23
4.	"WomanChild"	McLorin Salvant	6:07
5.	"Le Front Caché Sur Tes Genoux"	McLorin Salvant, Ida Faubert	5:11
6.	"Prelude / There's a Lull in My Life"	Aaron Diehl, Harry Revel, Mack Gordon	5:14
7.	"You Bring Out the Savage in Me"	Sam Coslow	5:07
8.	"Baby Have Pity on Me"	Billy Moll, Clarence Williams	3:21
9.	"John Henry"	Traditional	5:12
10.	"Jitterbug Waltz"	Charles Grean, Fats Waller, Maxine Manners	6:51
11.	"What a Little Moonlight Can Do"	Harry M. Woods	8:14
12.	"Deep Dark Blue"	McLorin Salvant	1:56
Total length:			58:48

== Personnel ==
- Cécile McLorin Salvant – vocals, piano (track 10)
- Aaron Diehl – piano
- Rodney Whitaker – double bass
- Herlin Riley – drums
- James Chirillo – guitar, banjo (tracks 1, 8)
