= Oh Snap (album) =

Studio album by Cécile McLorin Salvant
- Released: September 19, 2025
- Recorded: November 2024
- Studio: Brooklyn Recording, NYC
- Genre: Jazz
- Length: 34:29
- Label: Nonesuch
- Producer: Cécile McLorin Salvant, Jack DeBoe

Cécile McLorin Salvant chronology
| Mélusine (2023) | Oh Snap (2025) | With Every Breath I Take (2026) |

Professional ratings
Aggregate scores
| Source | Rating |
|---|---|
| Metacritic | 71/100 |
Review scores
| Source | Rating |
| All About Jazz | 4/5 stars |
| AllMusic | 3.5/5 stars |
| The Arts Desk | 5/5 stars |
| The Guardian | 4/5 stars |
| Jazzwise | 4/5 stars |
| Le Devoir | 4/5 stars |
| Mojo | 4/5 stars |
| Record Collector | 4/5 stars |
| Tom Hull | B |
| Uncut | 3.5/5 stars |

Oh Snap is the eighth studio album by French-American jazz vocalist and composer Cécile McLorin Salvant, released on September 19, 2025 by Nonesuch Records. The album represents a significant departure from Salvant's previous works, consisting primarily of her original songs that blend pop, folk, electronic, and jazz elements and influences.

== Background ==
The album was recorded in November 2024 at Brooklyn Recording and at the Salvant's home studio also in Brooklyn. The record features her long-time collaborators: pianist Sullivan Fortner, bassist Yasushi Nakamura, and drummer Kyle Poole, with guest appearances from singers June McDoom and Kate Davis. The album was co-produced by Salvant and Jack DeBoe, who also handled the mixing.

Salvant wrote and initially recorded the songs alone at home, using digital tools such as GarageBand and Logic, with no initial intention of releasing them. The project originated from her desire to reconnect with music on an intimate, personal level, taking inspiration from the free and playful approach she takes to her visual art. The songs reflect her eclectic musical influences from growing up in Miami in the 1990s, ranging from boy bands and grunge to classical and folk.

== Reception ==
According to the review aggregator Metacritic, Oh Snap received generally positive reviews based on a weighted average score of 71 out of 100 from 4 critic scores.

Kurt Gottschalk of JazzTimes wrote: "It’s an eclectic album without a doubt — a self-portrait of a girl who grew up in Miami avidly listening to the Backstreet Boys and exposed to classical and grunge records and folk music from around the world. Oh Snap is a cosmopolitan album born of a multicultural upbringing." John Fordham of The Guardian mentioned: "Her new album, Oh Snap, is a set of 12 originals and one cover that she created on her own over four years, before adding her band. She experimented for the first time with computer-generated sounds to draw on grungy pop and intimate folk music and expand on the classical-vocal education and extensive jazz input she acquired while living in France in the 2000s. Salvant says her enthusiasms as a visual artist also liberated her for this adventurous step-change."

Sandro Cerini of Musica Jazz added: "We are personally convinced that Oh Snap is not only one of the finest albums of 2025, but also, in terms of sheer creative intelligence, one of the most significant musical statements of recent years."

== Track listing ==
All tracks are written by Cécile McLorin Salvant except where noted.

| No. | Title | Writer(s) | Length |
|---|---|---|---|
| 1. | "I am a Volcano" | | 2:14 |
| 2. | "Anything but Now" | | 2:23 |
| 3. | "Take This Stone (feat. June McDoom & Kate Davis)" | | 3:34 |
| 4. | "What Does Blue Mean to You?" | | 4:39 |
| 5. | "Brick House" | Lionel Richie, Milan Williams, Ronald LaPread, Thomas McClary, Walter Orange, William King | 0:27 |
| 6. | "Oh Snap" | | 4:11 |
| 7. | "Second Guessing" | | 2:28 |
| 8. | "Expanse" | | 2:11 |
| 9. | "Eureka" | | 2:37 |
| 10. | "Thank You" | | 2:59 |
| 11. | "A Little Bit More" | | 2:04 |
| 12. | "Nun" | | 2:23 |
| 13. | "A Frog Jumps In" | Traditional | 2:19 |
| Total length: | | | 34:29 |

== Personnel ==
Band

- Cécile McLorin Salvant – vocals, synths, voice memo, production
- Sullivan Fortner – synths, Fender Rhodes, keys, backing vocals, drum programming, piano, organ
- Kyle Poole – drums
- Yasushi Nakamura – bass, upright bass
- June McDoom – vocals
- Kate Davis – vocals
- Evan Wright – guitar, bass
- Keita Ogawa – percussion
- Weedie Braimah – percussion

Production

- Jack DeBoe – co-producer, engineer, editing, mixing
- Andy Taub – engineer
- Heba Kadry – mastering
