= Michetti =

Michetti is an Italian surname. Notable people with the surname include:

- Emanuele Michetti Italian director and screenwriter
- Francesco Paolo Michetti (1851–1929) Italian painter
- Gabriela Michetti, Argentine politician
- Giorgio Michetti, Italian World War I flying ace
- Nicola Michetti (1675–1758) Italian architect active in Russia
