= Dreams and Daggers =

2017 studio album by Cécile McLorin Salvant

Studio album with live tracks by Cécile McLorin Salvant
- Released: September 29, 2017
- Recorded: September 9–11, 2016 and December 2016
- Venue: The Village Vanguard; Dimenna Center for Classical Music
- Genre: Jazz
- Length: 1:52:00 (2 CDs/3 LPs)
- Language: English; French
- Label: Mack Avenue
- Producer: Al Pryor; Gretchen Valade (exec. producer)

Cécile McLorin Salvant chronology
For One to Love (2015)	Dreams and Daggers (2017)	The Window (2018)

Professional ratings
Aggregate scores
Source	Rating
Metacritic	89/100
Review scores
Source	Rating
AllMusic	5/5 stars
The Arts Desk	5/5 stars
Evening Standard	5/5 stars
The Guardian	5/5 stars
The Irish Times	4/5 stars
Pitchfork	7.6/10
Tom Hull	B+

Dreams and Daggers is an album by French-American jazz singer Cécile McLorin Salvant that includes songs recorded both during live performance and in the studio. The album was released as a set of two CDs or three LPs on Mack Avenue Records on September 29, 2017.

== Reception ==
AllMusic reviewer Matt Collar described the album as "a thoughtfully curated selection of standards and several originals, all touching upon the themes of romance and heartbreak", and awarded it five stars.

Stereophile reviewer Fred Kaplan declared the album to be "the best jazz vocal album in a decade, maybe in longer than that."

The album earned Salvant her third Grammy nomination and her second Grammy Award for Best Jazz Vocal Album. The album was also nominated for the 2018 NAACP Image Award for Outstanding Jazz Album.

== Track listing ==
Disc 1
No.	Title	Lyrics	Music	Length
1.	"And Yet" (*)	Cécile McLorin Salvant	Paul Sikivie	1:06
2.	"Devil May Care"	Bob Dorough; Terrell P. Kirk, Jr.	Bob Dorough; Terrell P. Kirk, Jr.	6:56
3.	"Mad About the Boy"	Noël Coward	Noël Coward	6:53
4.	"Sam Jones' Blues"	Al Bernard; J. Russel Robinson; Roy Turk	Al Bernard; J. Russel Robinson; Roy Turk	3:00
5.	"More" (*)	Cécile McLorin Salvant	Cécile McLorin Salvant	3:33
6.	"Never Will I Marry"	Frank Loesser	Frank Loesser	4:03
7.	"Somehow I Never Could Believe"	Langston Hughes	Kurt Weill	9:56
8.	"If a Girl Isn't Pretty"	Bob Merrill	Jule Styne	2:55
9.	"Red Instead" (*)	Cécile McLorin Salvant	Cécile McLorin Salvant	0:34
10.	"Runnin' Wild"	Arthur Gibbs; Joe Grey; Leo Wood	Arthur Gibbs; Joe Grey; Leo Wood	1:39
11.	"The Best Thing for You (Would Be Me)"	Irving Berlin	Irving Berlin	7:08

Disc 2
No.	Title	Lyrics	Music	Length
12.	"You're My Thrill" (*)	Sidney Clare	Jay Gorney	4:34
13.	"I Didn't Know What Time It Was"	Lorenz Hart	Richard Rodgers	6:29
14.	"Tell Me What They're Saying Can't Be True"	Buddy Johnson	Buddy Johnson	5:29
15.	"Nothing Like You"	Bob Dorough	Bob Dorough	3:49
16.	"You've Got to Give Me Some"	Spencer Williams	Spencer Williams	6:11
17.	"The Worm" (*)	Cécile McLorin Salvant	Paul Sikivie	1:03
18.	"My Man's Gone Now"	Ira Gershwin; DuBose Heyward	George Gershwin	6:27
19.	"Let's Face the Music and Dance"	Irving Berlin	Irving Berlin	6:55
20.	"Si j'etais Blanche"	Bobby Falk; Leo Lelièvre; Henri Varna	Bobby Falk; Leo Lelièvre; Henri Varna	5:14
21.	"Fascination" (*)	Langston Hughes (poem)	Cécile McLorin Salvant; Paul Sikivie	1:27
22.	"Wild Women Don't Have the Blues"	Ida Cox	Ida Cox	6:50
23.	"You're Getting to Be a Habit with Me"	Al Dubin	Harry Warren	9:53

Tracks marked with asterisk (*) recorded in studio at the DiMenna Center for Classical Music. All other tracks recorded live at the Village Vanguard.

== Personnel ==
- Cécile McLorin Salvant – vocals
- Aaron Diehl – piano on all tracks except "Red Instead", "You've Got to Give Me Some" and "Fascination"
- Sullivan Fortner – piano on "You've Got to Give Me Some"
- Paul Sikivie – double bass on all tracks except "Red Instead", "You've Got to Give Me Some" and "Fascination"; string arrangement on "And Yet", "More", "Red Instead", "You're My Thrill", "The Worm" and "Fascination"
- Lawrence Leathers – drums on all tracks except "Red Instead", "You've Got to Give Me Some" and "Fascination"
- Catalyst Quartet – strings on "And Yet", "More", "Red Instead", "You're My Thrill", "The Worm" and "Fascination"
  - Karla Donehew-Perez – violin
  - Suliman Tekalli – violin
  - Paul Laraia – viola
  - Karlos Rodriguez – cello

Production

- Al Pryor – production
- Cecile McLorin Salvant – production; booklet art direction, handwriting and illustrations
- Gretchen Valade – executive production
- Will Wakefield – production management
- Damon Whittemore – record engineering
- Todd Whitelock – record engineering, mix engineering
- Josh Welshman – engineering assistance
- Isaiah Abolin – engineering assistance
- Akihiro Nishimura – engineering assistance
- Doug Iszlai – engineering assistance
- Allen Rubinstein – front-of-house engineering for the Village Vanguard
- Richie Clarke – front-of-house engineering consultancy for Mack Avenue Records
- Mark Wilder – master engineering
- Kevin Gray – LP cut engineering
- Raj Naik – booklet layout and design
- Mark Fitton – booklet photography
- Maria Ehrenreich – creative services and production
- Sharon Green – product management

== Charts ==
Chart (2018)	Peak position
New Zealand Albums (RMNZ)	40
