= Love & Liberation =

Studio album by Jazzmeia Horn
- Released: August 23, 2019
- Genre: Jazz
- Length: 48:09
- Label: Concord

Love & Liberation is a 2019 studio album by Jazzmeia Horn.

The album received a Grammy Award nomination for Best Jazz Vocal Album.

== Background ==
Love & Liberation follow's Horn's 2017 album A Social Call. In contrast to A Social Call which Horn describes a "call to social awareness", Horn describes Love & Liberation as a "call to action".

The sixth track on the album, "Legs and Arms" was written by Horn during her time at The New School while residing in a dormitory in Chelsea, Manhattan. The lyrics are written from the perspective of a man who was stalking Horn at the time:

...there was a stalker who just kept watching me in my room consistently every morning. He had figured out my schedule, and I'd see him watching me through the window. And a teacher of mine, I explained to her what was going on, and she said you should write a song about it. You know, you should do something about it that brings joy to you. You know, you should turn the situation into something positive.

— Jazzmeia Horn, Jazzmeia Horn On 'Love And Liberation', NPR

== Track listing ==
All tracks are written by Jazzmeia Horn unless listed.

No.	Title	Writer(s)	Length
1.	"Free Your Mind"		4:47
2.	"Time"		1:55
3.	"Out the Window"		3:30
4.	"No More"	Jon Hendricks, Hubert Laws	3:47
5.	"When I Say"		2:29
6.	"Legs and Arms"		7:23
7.	"Searchin'"		3:02
8.	"Green Eyes"	Victor E. Cooke, James Poyser, Erykah Badu	5:19
9.	"Still Tryin'"		4:23
10.	"Only You"		1:14
11.	"Reflections of My Heart"	George Duke, Rachelle Ferrell	6:32
12.	"I Thought About You"	Jimmy Van Heusen, Johnny Mercer	3:48

== Personnel ==
- Jazzmeia Horn - Vocals
- Victor Gould - Piano
- Sullivan Fortner - Piano
- Stacey Dillard - Tenor Saxophone
- Josh Evans - Trumpet
- Ben Williams - Bass
- Jamison Ross - Drums
