= For One to Love =

Studio album by Cécile McLorin Salvant
- Released: September 4, 2015
- Recorded: 2014–2015
- Studio: Avatar Studios, NYC
- Genre: Jazz
- Length: 52:44
- Label: Mack Avenue
- Producer: Gretchen Valade (executive producer), Al Pryor (producer)

Cécile McLorin Salvant chronology
WomanChild (2013)	For One to Love (2015)	Dreams and Daggers (2017)

For One to Love is a studio album by French-American jazz singer Cécile McLorin Salvant. Mack Avenue released the album on September 4, 2015. The record is the singer's third album and the follow-up to WomanChild (2013).

== Background ==
In her interview for Essence Salvant mentioned: "It’s jazz, it’s blues, we do some folk elements in there, and we do musicals. I like to sort of question different things about the way we live and about the things we think are acceptable without being too blatant about it. It’s just music that you can sit and listen to and chill and cook to, but also dance and rock out to." Salvant composed five original songs for the record.

== Critical reception ==
Professional ratings
Review scores
Source	Rating
AllMusic	4/5 stars
Boston Globe	(positive)
The Guardian	4/5 stars
Jazzwise	4/5 stars
Wall Street Journal	(positive)
Tom Hull	B+

The album was released to critical acclaim from publications such as the New York Times, The Guardian, and Los Angeles Times. For One to Love won Grammy Award for Best Jazz Vocal Album of 2016.

Christopher Loudon of JazzTimes stated: " It’s mighty tough to follow so massive a critical and popular hit. Given, however, the depth and breadth of Salvant’s musical gifts, it’s hardly surprising that For One to Love is even more impressive. Sly and sensuous, partial to featherlight flights yet solid as oak, Salvant is preternaturally brilliant at synthesizing a century’s worth of influences—shades of Bessie Smith, Billie Holiday and Blossom Dearie are clearly evident—while remaining her mesmeric self."

== Track listing ==
No.	Title	Writer(s)	Length
1.	"Fog"	Cécile McLorin Salvant	5:15
2.	"Growlin' Dan"	Blanche Calloway; Clyde Hart (pianist)	4:34
3.	"Stepsisters' Lament"	Oscar Hammerstein II; Richard Rodgers	2:19
4.	"Look at Me"	Salvant	2:44
5.	"Wives and Lovers"	Burt Bacharach; Hal David	2:51
6.	"Left Over"	Salvant	4:27
7.	"The Trolley Song"	Ralph Blane; Hugh Martin	3:51
8.	"Monday"	Salvant	2:00
9.	"What's the Matter Now?"	Clarence Williams; Spencer Williams	4:17
10.	"Le Mal de vivre"	Monique Andrée Serf	6:14
11.	"Something's Coming"	Leonard Bernstein; Stephen Sondheim	10:33
12.	"Underling"	Salvant	3:39
Total length:			52:44

== Personnel ==
Adapted from AllMusic.

- Cécile McLorin Salvant – vocals
- Aaron Diehl – piano
- Paul Sikivie – double bass
- Lawrence Leathers – drums

== Charts ==
Chart (2015)	Peak position
Belgian Albums (Ultratop Flanders)	118
French Albums (SNEP)	156
Swiss Albums (Schweizer Hitparade)	58
US Billboard Top Heatseekers	3
US Billboard Jazz Albums	2
US Billboard Top Independent Albums	28
