= Cécile & the Jean-François Bonnel Paris Quintet =

2010 jazz album

Cécile

Studio album by Cécile McLorin Salvant & The Jean-François Bonnel Paris Quintet
- Released: October 27, 2010
- Recorded: November, 2009 — March, 2010
- Studio: SYSMO Records, Paris
- Genre: Jazz
- Length: 48:37
- Label: Self Released
- Producer: Lena McLorin Salvant

Cécile McLorin Salvant chronology
Cécile (2010)	WomanChild (2013)

Professional ratings
Review scores
Source	Rating
AllMusic	4/5 stars

Cécile, is the debut album by French-American jazz singer Cécile McLorin Salvant. The album was released shortly after she won first prize in the Thelonious Monk International Jazz Competition in 2010 and is composed primarily of both time-tested and unusual jazz standards.

== Background ==
Jean-François Bonnel is a woodwind player and teacher from Aix-en-Provence where Salvant lived after her high school graduation. Bonnel was her tutor on improvisation and technique. Salvant says: "He really encouraged me from there, enrolling me in classes and giving me different records to listen to. I was nervous, but within three months, I had my first jazz gig in France."

== Reception ==
Matt Collar of AllMusic stated: " With her impeccable phrasing, bell-tone voice, and knack for picking both time-tested and unusual standards, Salvant has been hailed as one of the best jazz vocalists of her generation, all of which is evident on Cecile."

== Track listing ==
No.	Title	Writer(s)	Length
1.	"Exactly Like You"	Jimmy McHugh	5:13
2.	"Moody's Mood For Love"	Eddie Jefferson	3:25
3.	"I've Got My Love to Keep Me Warm"	Irving Berlin	3:18
4.	"I Got It Bad and That Ain't Good"	Duke Ellington & Paul Francis Webster	4:35
5.	"No Regrets"		4:06
6.	"Detour Ahead"	Herb Ellis, John Frigo & Lou Carter	2:27
7.	"Frosty Morning Blues"		4:42
8.	"Easy to Love"	Cole Porter	3:27
9.	"Social Call"	Jon Hendricks & Gigi Gryce	3:24
10.	"I Wonder Where Our Love Has Gone"	Buddy Johnson	4:36
11.	"Anything Goes"	Cole Porter	4:47
12.	"After You've Gone"	Turner Layton & Henry Creamer	4:37
Total length:			48:37

== Personnel ==
Adapted from AllMusic.

- Cécile McLorin Salvant – vocals
- Jean-François Bonnel - clarinet, tenor saxophone
- Jacques Schneck – piano
- Pierre Maingourd – bass
- Sylvain Glévarec – drums
- Enzo Mucci - guitar
