= Ghost Song (album) =

Studio album by Cécile McLorin Salvant
- Released: March 4, 2022
- Recorded: October 7, 2020
- Venues: The Bunker Studio, St. Malachy Roman Catholic Church
- Genre: Jazz
- Length: 46:08
- Label: Nonesuch
- Producers: Cécile McLorin Salvant; Sullivan Fortner

Cécile McLorin Salvant chronology
The Window (2018)	Ghost Song (2022)	Mélusine (2023)

Ghost Song is a studio album by French-American jazz vocalist Cécile McLorin Salvant, on which she is accompanied by pianists Aaron Diehl and Sullivan Fortner. The album was released on March 4, 2022, by Nonesuch Records and is her first release for the label. It was chosen as Album of the Month for both performance and sonics by Stereophile in April 2022.

== Critical reception ==
Professional ratings
Aggregate scores
Source	Rating
Metacritic	87/100
Review scores
Source	Rating
AllMusic	4.5/5 stars
The Arts Desk	5/5 stars
DownBeat	4.5/5 stars
Financial Times	5/5 stars
Analog Planet	10/11
JazzTrail	4.5/5 stars
Mojo	4/5 stars
Stereophile	5/5 stars
Tom Hull	B+
Uncut	4/5 stars

In the Wall Street Journal, Larry Blumenfeld wrote, "Her ideas have grown bolder with each album, and especially with 'Ogresse,' an unreleased cantata for which she wrote the story, lyrics and music... 'Ghost Song' is her boldest act yet. Here, Ms. Salvant displays yet more sonic range and nuance—soaring through intervals, moving nimbly through tricky rhythms, and reveling in pithy turns of phrase. Her voice is singularly arresting, yet it is never a single sound. It's playful, nearly giddy, on "Optimistic Voices" (from The Wizard of Oz), and then sultry when that song segues into Gregory Porter's 'No Love Dying.' It's a blues holler to start the title track, one of seven original compositions, and nearly soft as a whisper to begin Sting's 'Until.'"

== Track listing ==
All tracks written by Salvant unless otherwise indicated.

Ghost Song track listing
No.	Title	Length
1.	"Wuthering Heights" (Kate Bush)	2:43
2.	"Optimistic Voices/No Love Dying" (Harold Arlen/Yip Harburg/Herbert Stothart / Gregory Porter)	7:24
3.	"Ghost Song"	3:23
4.	"Obligation"	1:33
5.	"Until" (Gordon Sumner)	6:32
6.	"I Lost My Mind"	3:41
7.	"Moon Song"	3:05
8.	"Trail Mix"	2:24
9.	"The World Is Mean" (Kurt Weill/Berthold Brecht/Marc Blitzstein)	4:49
10.	"Dead Poplar"	2:36
11.	"Thunderclouds"	3:37
12.	"Unquiet Grave" (Traditional/arr. Salvant)	4:21
Total length:		46:08

== Personnel ==
- Cécile McLorin Salvant – composing, producing, vocals
- Aaron Diehl – piano
- Alexa Tarantino – flute
- Burniss Travis – bass
- Daniel Swenberg – lute, theorbo
- James Chirillo – banjo
- Keita Ogawa – percussion
- Kyle Poole – drums
- Marvin Sewell – guitar
- Paul Sikivie – bass, synthesizer
- Sullivan Fortner – piano, producing
