= Prestige Records =

American jazz record label

- Parent company: Concord
- Founded: 1949; 76 years ago
- Founder: Bob Weinstock
- Genre: Jazz
- Country of origin: United States
- Location: New York City
- Official website: concordmusicgroup.com/labels/Prestige

Prestige Records is a jazz record company and label founded in 1949 by Bob Weinstock in New York City which issued recordings in the mainstream, bop, and cool jazz idioms. The company recorded hundreds of albums by many of the leading jazz musicians of the day, sometimes issuing them on subsidiary labels. The company's began releasing jazz records in 78 and 45 RPM formats in 1950. The Prestige label includes the 13000 and 25000 cat# series. Prestige International was a sub-label of Prestige, active from 1960 to 1969, that mostly released folk music. In 1971, the company was sold to Fantasy, which was later absorbed by Concord.

== History ==
The Prestige office was located at 446 West 50th Street, New York City. Its catalogue included Gene Ammons, John Coltrane, Miles Davis, Stan Getz, Wardell Gray, Thelonious Monk, and Sonny Rollins.

Audio engineer Rudy Van Gelder was the recording engineer of many Prestige albums in the 1950s and early-to-mid-1960s. Prestige created new labels in 1960: Swingville, Moodsville, covering jazz, Bluesville featuring blues revival artists, Lively Arts featuring spoken word recordings and Prestige International, Prestige Folklore, Irish and Near East with folk and world music.

By the later 1950s, Weinstock ceased supervising recording sessions directly, employing Chris Albertson, Ozzie Cadena, Esmond Edwards, Don Schlitten, and producer/music supervisor Bob Porter, among others, to fulfill this function. Musicians recording for the label in the 1960s included Jaki Byard and Booker Ervin, while Prestige remained commercially viable by recording a number of soul jazz artists like Charles Earland. In 1966 the company's headquarters were located at 203 South Washington Avenue in Bergenfield, New Jersey.

The company was sold to Fantasy Records in 1971, and original releases on the label formed a significant proportion of its Original Jazz Classics line. Fantasy was purchased by Concord Records in 2005.

In 2017, Concord Music Group revived the Prestige label. The first album released under the label's reactivation was A Social Call from Texas native Jazzmeia Horn.
