= Southern Nights (Sullivan Fortner album) =

Studio album by Sullivan Fortner
- Released: 2025
- Recorded: July 8, 2023
- Studios: Sear Sound, New York City
- Genre: Jazz
- Label: Artwork

Southern Nights is an album by Sullivan Fortner. It was recorded in 2023 and released in 2025 by Artwork Records. It won the Grammy Award for Best Jazz Instrumental Album in 2026.

== Music and recording ==
Pianist Sullivan Fortner had worked separately with bassist Peter Washington and drummer Marcus Gilmore, but their first performances as a trio were at the Village Vanguard in New York City in July 2023. On 8 July, before one night of their week's residency at the club, they recorded the music for this album at Sear Sound. There were "no edits, retakes, or isolation in the studio".

The title track was a hit for Glen Campbell in 1977 but is played in a more New Orleans style on this album, reflecting the origins of both Fortner and its composer, Allen Toussaint. The melody of "I Love You" emerges from Fortner's abstract playing; "Again, Never" is a ballad featuring a bass solo; and "Daahoud" begins with a drum solo. "9 Bar Blues" is a Thelonious Monk-influenced original by Fortner. "Waltz for Monk" is reharmonised.

== Release and reception ==
Professional ratings
Review scores
Source	Rating
AllMusic	4/5 stars
DownBeat	4.5/5 stars
Financial Times	4/5 stars
Jazzwise	4/5 stars

Southern Nights was released by Artwork Records in 2025. It won the Grammy Award for Best Jazz Instrumental Album in 2026.

Alyn Shipton, writing for Jazzwise, concluded that the album was "an enthralling listen from a trio at the top of its game". The DownBeat reviewer wrote: "it's amazing to listen to what this trio accomplishes: complex rhythms and chord changes, beautiful melodies and quirky 'out' passages, all presented as if gliding on air".

== Track listing ==
1. "Southern Nights" (Allen Toussaint) – 5:38
2. "I Love You" (Cole Porter) – 5:13
3. "9 Bar Tune" (Sullivan Fortner) – 3:45
4. "Tres Palabras" (Osvaldo Farrés) – 6:35
5. "Waltz for Monk" (Donald Brown) – 4:07
6. "Again, Never" (Bill Lee) – 7:11
7. "Discovery" (Consuela Lee Moorehead) – 5:25
8. "Daahoud" (Clifford Brown) – 5:46
9. "Organ Grinder" (Woody Shaw) – 5:31

== Personnel ==
- Sullivan Fortner – piano
- Peter Washington – bass
- Marcus Gilmore – drums
