= Journey in Black =

2023 album by Christie Dashiell

Studio album by Christie Dashiell
- Released: September 22, 2023
- Genre: Jazz
- Length: 55:55
- Label: Self-released

Christie Dashiell chronology
Time All Mine (2016)	Journey in Black (2023)

Journey in Black is an album by Christie Dashiell. The album earned Dashiell a Grammy Award nomination for Best Jazz Vocal Album.

== Background ==
In an interview with NPR, Dashiell said:

I wanted Journey in Black to—while the title is—like, black is kind of the central word in the title, I wanted to open up what black looks like and means to people. So often I find I lead my life with, I'm a Black woman, and this is my Black experience, which is incredibly true. And also sometimes that blocks me from experiencing things more from a human space. And I think, like, the human themes of love, loss, grief, joy, friendship—all of us can relate to that, Black, white, brown, whatever.

She also spoke of the first track on the album, "Ancestral Folk Song", as honoring her grandmothers and other ancestors "that made the music".

== Track listing ==
Journey in Black track listing
No.	Title	Length
1.	"Ancestral Folk Song"	8:56
2.	"Grief"	7:13
3.	"How It Ends"	5:38
4.	"Anyone Who Had a Heart"	7:30
5.	"Always Stay"	3:04
6.	"Influence"	5:44
7.	"The Things You Do"	5:33
8.	"Invitation"	7:53
9.	"Brother Sister"	4:24
Total length:		55:55
