= Kate McGarry =

American jazz vocalist

- Born: Hyannis, Massachusetts, U.S.
- Genres: Jazz, vocal jazz
- Occupation: Singer
- Instrument: Vocals
- Years active: 1990–present
- Labels: Palmetto, Sunnyside
- Website: katemcgarry.com

Katherine Genevieve McGarry, known professionally as Kate McGarry, is a jazz vocalist.

== Career ==
McGarry grew up in an Irish-American family with nine siblings in Hyannis, Massachusetts. She attended the University of Massachusetts Amherst, graduating with a degree in jazz and Afro-American Music. After graduating, she became a member of the vocal group One O'Clock Jump. For ten years she lived in Los Angeles. She sang in clubs, did film and television work in Hollywood, and recorded her first album, Easy to Love (1992). In 1996, she moved to the Catskill Mountains in New York to study at an ashram. Three years later, she moved to New York City, returned to singing in clubs, and recorded her second album, Show Me.

McGarry looks beyond the jazz world for material, singing cover versions of Peter Gabriel, Björk, and Joni Mitchell on Mercy Streets (Palmetto, 2005), the Irish song "The Heather on the Hill" on The Target (Palmetto, 2007), and "American Tune" by Paul Simon on Genevieve & Ferdinand (Sunnyside, 2014), which she recorded with her husband, guitarist Keith Ganz.

She has worked with Kurt Elling, Fred Hersch, John Hollenbeck, and Maria Schneider. She appeared on the radio programs Piano Jazz with Marian McPartland, All Things Considered, and Jazz Set with Dee Dee Bridgewater. She has taught at the Manhattan School of Music and New England Conservatory of Music.

== Awards and honors ==
- Grammy Award nomination for Best Jazz Vocal Album, If Less is More...Nothing is Everything, 2009
- Grammy Award nomination for Best Jazz Vocal Album, The Subject Tonight Is Love, 2019
- Voted Rising Star, Down Beat magazine's Critics' Poll, 2011–2016
- Outstanding Jazz Vocalist, NYC Nightlife Awards
- Jazz ambassador, three years

== Discography ==
=== As leader ===
- Easy to Love (Vacuum Tube Logic of America, 1992)
- Show Me (Palmetto, 2003)
- Mercy Streets (Palmetto, 2005)
- The Target (Palmetto, 2007)
- If Less Is More... (Palmetto, 2008)
- Girl Talk (Palmetto, 2012)
- Genevieve and Ferdinand with Keith Ganz (Sunnyside, 2014)
- The Subject Tonight Is Love with Keith Ganz (Binxtown, 2018)
- What to Wear in the Dark (Resilience Music Alliance, 2021)

=== As guest ===
- Brian Byrne, Goldenhair (2017)
- Fred Hersch, Leaves of Grass (2005)
- John Hollenbeck, Songs We Like a Lot (Sunnyside, 2015)
- Mike Holober, Balancing Act (2015)
- Kenny Loggins, More Songs from Pooh Corner (2000)
