= Christie Dashiell =

American singer

- Born: Christie Nicole Dashiell; September 8, 1988 (age 38); Washington, D.C., United States
- Genre: Jazz
- Occupation: Musician
- Instrument: Singer
- Formerly of: Sweet Honey in the Rock (2017−2022)
- Website: christiedashiell.com

Christie Nicole Dashiell (Born: September 8, 1988) is an American jazz singer. She was born in Washington, D.C., and raised in Greenville, North Carolina. She studied jazz voice at Howard University for four years and then at grad school at the Manhattan School of Music, then participated in an artist-in-residence program at the Mansion at Strathmore. She now teaches jazz voice at Howard, where her father, Carroll Dashiell Jr., a bass player, is now chair of the Music Department. She received two Grammy nominations.

Her debut solo album, Time All Mine, debuted on Billboard’s Jazz Album and Contemporary Jazz Album Charts at numbers 13 and 22, as well as making JazzTimes’ Top 50 Writer's Ballots, Critics’ Poll. Her second album, Journey in Black, was nominated for the 2025 Best Jazz Vocal Album Grammy Award. For the 2026 Grammy Awards, she received a nomination for her album We Insist 2025! in the Best Jazz Vocal Album category.

== Early Life and Education ==
Christie Nicole Dashiell was born in Washington, D.C., and raised in Greenville, North Carolina, and comes from a highly creative, musically accomplished background. As the third of four multi-talented children born to world-class, highly recognized jazz bassist Carroll V. Dashiell Jr., she had a musically rich upbringing and was constantly surrounded by mentors and immersed in live jazz culture from a young age. In the Dashiell household, music had deep significance and was more than a pastime; it was treated as a meticulous daily routine. Looking back on her upbringing, Christie had encouraging parents who supported complete freedom in exploring the artistic world while simultaneously demanding unwavering dedication to the art form. The moment she felt herself drawn to music, daily practice became non-negotiable. In her early years, she took part in various musical activities, from school choirs to district orchestra and jazz ensembles at J.H. Rose High School, which helped her build a strong technical foundation.

Christie’s immersive musical background naturally guided her throughout her higher education. She enrolled at Howard University, where she was able to rapidly make herself a standout undergraduate vocalist and core soloist within the university’s premier vocal jazz ensemble, Afro-Blue. Following her success as an undergraduate, she decided to refine her technical skills further while also refining her vocal arranging skills and improvisational fluency by being a part of the prestigious Manhattan School of Music. As a student at the prestigious school, she was able to increase her mastery of advanced jazz composition and contemporary styling.

== Early Career and Performances ==
Christie earned early-career validation quickly by competing in rigorous platforms and performing at high-profile events across the Mid-Atlantic region. She earned herself widespread national recognition by becoming a semifinalist in the prestigious Thelonious Monk Institute International Jazz Vocals Competition. Her public profile grew exponentially when she appeared on NBC’s hit prime-time acapella competition series The Sing-Off as a featured performer and vocalist in the jazz ensemble Afro-Blue. This opportunity introduced her sophisticated vocal artistry to millions of viewers nationwide.

By participating in these competitive milestones and appearing on television, she opened opportunities for her to perform on legendary stages across the United States. She gave highly celebrated performances at well-known cultural institutions, including featured concert appearances at the Kennedy Center. A devoted following among jazz critics, industry partners, and contemporary music enthusiasts alike was cultivated by her performances on these grand stages, captivating them with her clean phrasing, expansive vocal range, agile scat singing, and warm, welcoming stage presence. She also began early collaborations that helped increase her reputation. Her collaborative footprint expanded at a rapid pace and included shared stages and studio recordings with highly-esteemed jazz icons such as Esperanza Spalding, Geri Allen, Smokey Robinson, Fred Hammond, and Allan Harris.

== Discography ==
- Time All Mine (2016)
- Journey in Black (2023)
