= Jazzmeia Horn =

American jazz singer (born 1991)

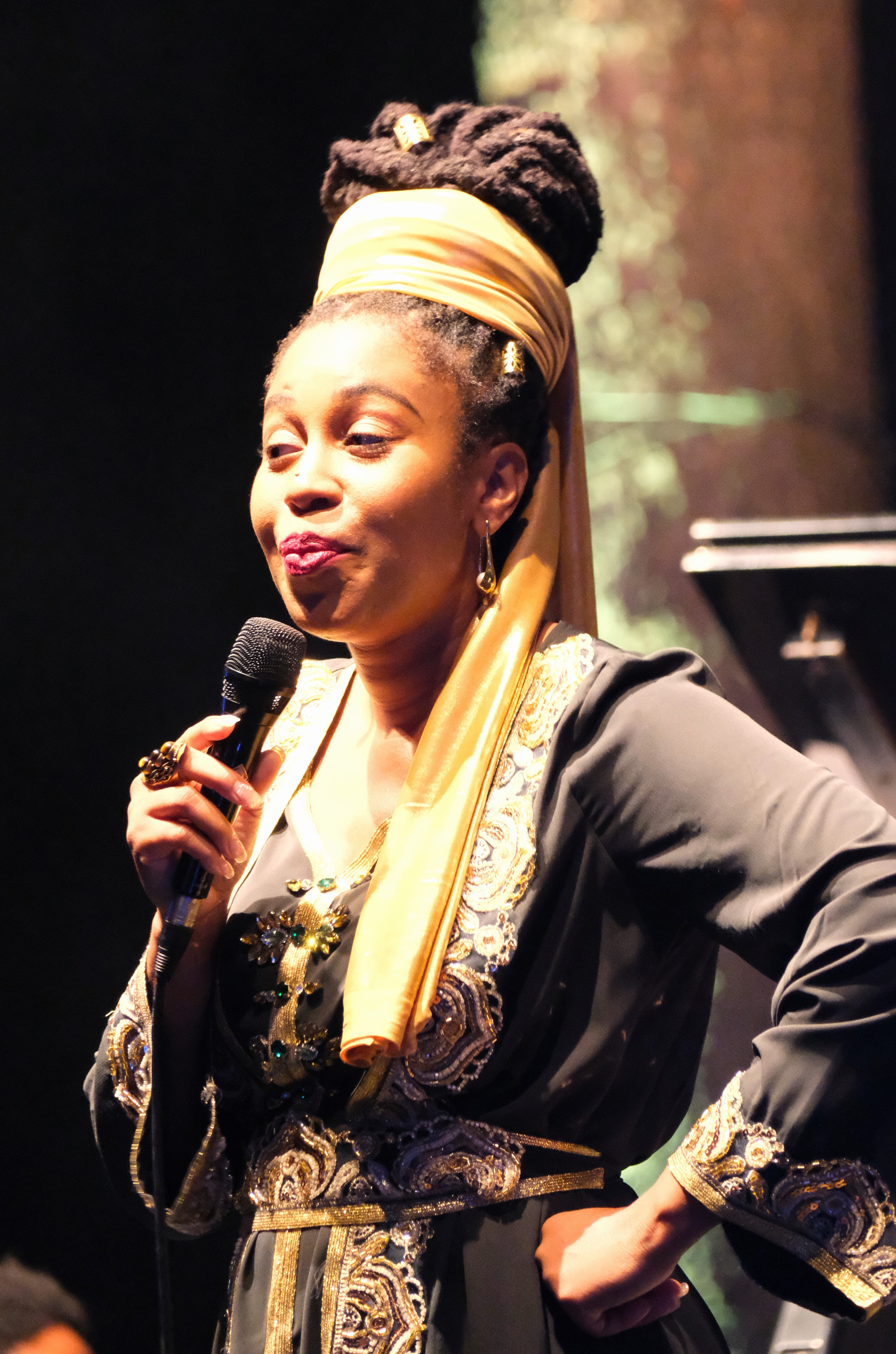
- Horn at the Istanbul Jazz Festival, 2025

Background information
- Born: 1991 (age 34–35); Dallas, Texas, U.S.
- Genres: Jazz; jazz fusion; R&B
- Occupations: Singer; songwriter
- Labels: Prestige Records; Concord Jazz; Empress Legacy
- Website: www.artistryofjazzhorn.com
- Education: The New School for Jazz and Contemporary Music

Jazzmeia Horn (born 1991) is an American jazz singer and songwriter. Her repertoire includes jazz standards and covers of songs from other genres, including by musicians such as Stevie Wonder. She has been compared to jazz vocalists such as Betty Carter, Sarah Vaughan, and Nancy Wilson. In 2015, she won the Thelonious Monk Institute International Jazz Competition.

== Early life and education ==
Horn was born and raised in Dallas, Texas. She attended the Booker T. Washington High School for the Performing and Visual Arts there.

Horn moved to New York City in 2009. She attended the New School for Jazz and Contemporary Music. During her first semester in New York City, she formed a trio featuring Javier Santiago, Nadav Lachishe, and Cory Cox.

== Career ==
Her first live radio show was in the fall of 2009 on the Junior Mance's WBGO radio show in Newark, New Jersey, and she has since performed at the Apollo Theater, Ginny's Supper Club, and the Metropolitan Room. She has received many accolades from jazz critics.

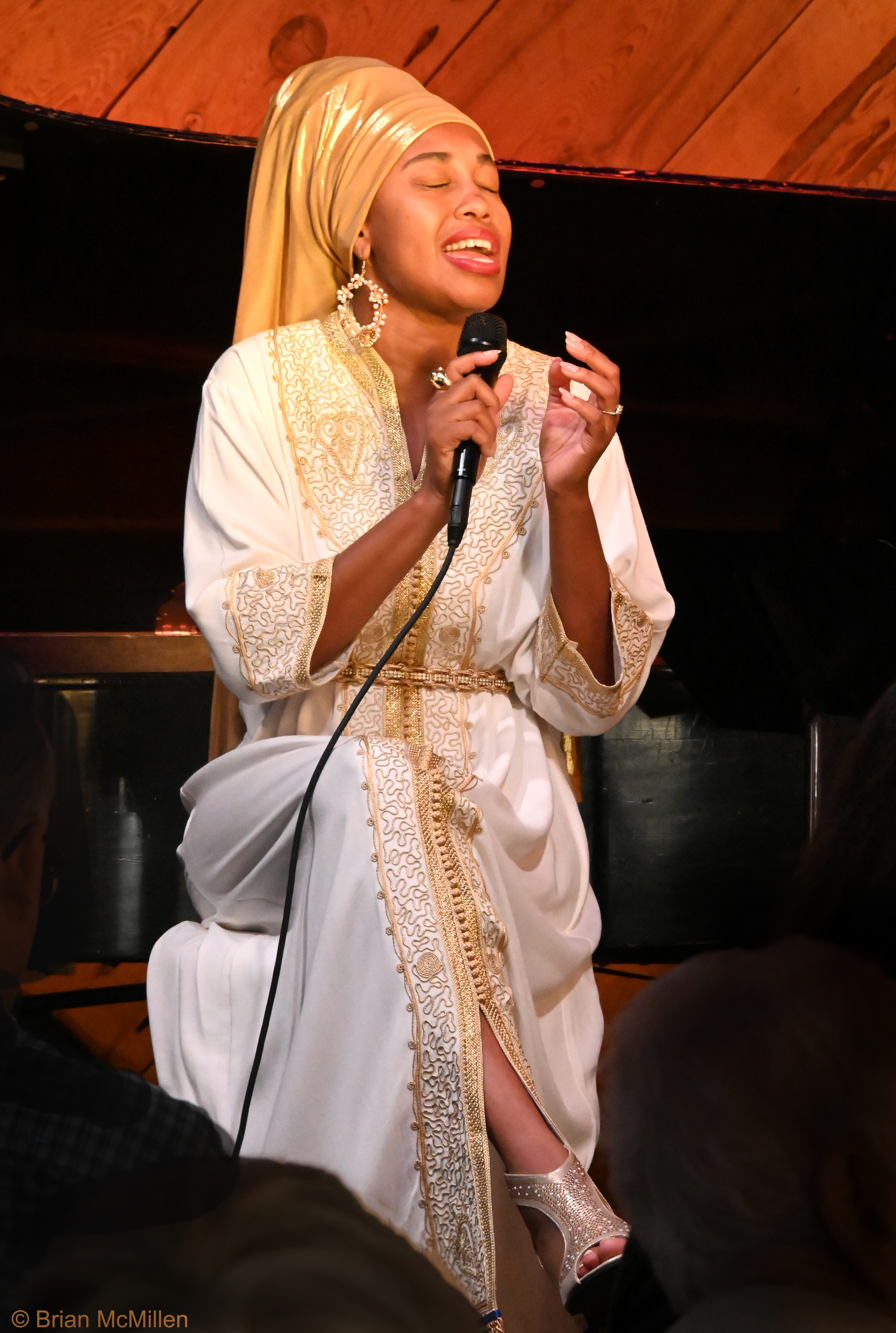
Horn at Bach Dancing & Dynamite Society, 2024

In 2014, Horn toured internationally in England, France, Russia, South Africa, and Austria.

In 2017, she was featured in South Australia's Generations in Jazz festival, singing alongside James Morrison, Wycliffe Gordon, Gordon Goodwin, Roscoe James Irwin, and others.

Also in 2017, she released her first album. Entitled A Social Call, it was ranked the number 1 album for 2017 by JazzWeek. The album tour took her throughout the U.S., Asia (Macau), and Europe (London, Paris, and Milan).

A Social Call earned Horn her first Grammy nomination in 2018. She performed at the 60th Grammy Award Ceremony on January 28, 2018.

Her follow-up album, Love & Liberation, earned her a second Grammy nomination in 2020 for Best Jazz Vocal Album.

== Discography ==
- A Social Call (Prestige, 2017)
- Love & Liberation (Concord Jazz, 2019)
- Dear Love (Empress Legacy, 2021) – with Her Noble Force
- Messages (Empress Legacy, 2024)

== Awards and honors ==
- 2008, 2009: DownBeat Student Music Award
- 2010: DownBeat "Vocal Jazz Soloist"
- 2012: Winner of the Sarah Vaughan International Jazz Vocal Competition, Rising Star award
- 2013: Winner of the Sarah Vaughan International Jazz Vocal Competition
- 2015: Winner of the Thelonious Monk Institute International Jazz Competition
- 2018; DownBeat "Rising Star Female Vocalist"
