= Find a Heart =

Studio album by Denise Donatelli
- Released: 2015
- Genre: Jazz
- Label: Savant

Denise Donatelli chronology
Soul Shadows (2012)	Find a Heart (2015)

Find a Heart is an album by Denise Donatelli. It earned Donatelli a Grammy Award nomination for Best Jazz Vocal Album.

== Track listing ==
1. "Big Noise, New York" (Marcelle Clements, Donald Fagen) – 6:17
2. "Love and Paris Rain" (Russell Ferrante. Will Kennedy, Brenda Russell) – 5:26
3. "Spaced Out (En Babia)" (Geoffrey Keezer, Susan Marder) – 4:23
4. "Practical Arrangement" (Rob Mathes, Gordon Sumner) – 3:56
5. "Find a Heart" (David Crosby) – 5:32
6. "Not Like This" (Jeremy Lubbock) – 4:10
7. "Eyes That Say I Love You" (Denise Donatelli) – 5:10
8. "In This Moment" (Billy Childs, Donatelli, Marder) – 5:38
9. "Troubled Child" (Jonathan Cain, Steve Perry, Neal Schon) – 5:31
10. "Midnight Sun" (Sonny Burke, Lionel Hampton, Johnny Mercer) – 6:21
11. "Day Dream" (Duke Ellington, John Latouche, Billy Strayhorn) – 5:35
