= With Every Breath I Take =

Studio album by Cécile McLorin Salvant
- Released: June 26, 2026
- Recorded: December 9–10, 2025
- Studio: MCO Studio 1, Hilversum
- Genre: Jazz
- Length: 51:01
- Label: Nonesuch
- Producers: Cécile McLorin Salvant; Darcy James Argue

Cécile McLorin Salvant chronology
Oh Snap (2025)	With Every Breath I Take (2026)

Professional ratings
Review scores
Source	Rating
AllMusic	4/5 stars
Jazzwise	4/5 stars
The List	4/5 stars
Mojo	4/5 stars
Record Collector	4/5 stars
Tom Hull	B+
Uncut	4/5 stars

With Every Breath I Take is a ninth studio album by French-American jazz vocalist Cécile McLorin Salvant, released on June 26, 2026, by Nonesuch Records. The album marks Salvant's first recording with a full 48-piece orchestra, featuring the Netherland's Metropole Orkest conducted by Jules Buckley. The songs, drawn from the Great American Songbook and musical theater, were newly arranged for the orchestra by composer and bandleader Darcy James Argue.

== Background ==
Salvant had performed with orchestras for over a decade and had long intended to make an album of this scale. However, other projects took precedence. The recording of the album was also beset by obstacles; Salvant noted that it took almost four years to bring the project to fruition, from the initial concept to entering the studio.

The album's repertoire comprises a curated selection of standards, show tunes, and a single original composition, "Left Over". Salvant stated that she did not choose the songs "because they are beautiful, but because they are crucial to me". The tracks form a thematic suite centered on longing and complex emotional states.

Salvant explained her choosing the songs for the album: "I think you can hear a song so many times that you stop thinking about what it’s actually saying. The words kind of lose their meaning through overexposure. So I try to infuse meaning into each word again — like I’m telling it for the first time." She also mentioned: "It is a rare opportunity to be able to make an album at this scale, which has been a dream of mine for many years. Darcy James Argue wrote stunning arrangements and the Metropole Orkest, conducted by the extraordinary Jules Buckley, gave these stories a cinematic dimension... I am so incredibly proud to share it."

== Reception ==
Peter Quinn of Jazzwise wrote: "With 10 songs reimagined in lush new arrangements by Darcy James Argue and brought to life by the Metropole Orkest under the baton of Jules Buckley, it's an album full of nuance and lyricism, and one of the most hauntingly beautiful things you'll hear this year." Rob Adams of The List stated: "It seems entirely appropriate that there’s a backstory of many years behind the creation of Cécile McLorin Salvant’s first orchestral album. The ten songs that make up With Every Breath I Take all sing with histories of their own: most of them have been in the repertoires of singers for decades. Salvant’s own ‘Left Over’ is the exception, although her singing of it with Darcy James Argue’s superb arranging for the Metropole Orkest puts it on the same level as the others in terms of lived experience."

== Track listing ==
With Every Breath I Take track listing
No.	Title	Writer(s)	Length
1.	"With Every Breath I Take"	Cy Coleman; David Zippel	3:44
2.	"Sophisticated Lady"	Duke Ellington; Irving Mills; Mitchell Parish	3:04
3.	"Send in the Clowns"	Stephen Sondheim	6:47
4.	"Barbara Song"	Bertold Brecht; Kurt Weill	8:13
5.	"Left Over"	Cécile McLorin Salvant	5:03
6.	"Ever Since the One I Love's Been Gone"	Buddy Johnson	3:14
7.	"Les Parapluies De Cherbourg"	Jacques Demy; Michel Legrand	5:17
8.	"I'll See You Again"	Noël Coward	3:28
9.	"Being Alive"	Sondheim	6:20
10.	"Lush Life"	Billy Strayhorn	5:51
Total length:			51:01

== Personnel ==
Credits are adapted from Tidal.

=== Performers, technical personnel, and artwork ===
- Cécile McLorin Salvant – vocals, production, creative direction, handwriting
- Sullivan Fortner – piano, celesta
- David Wong – bass
- Kush Abadey – drums
- Darcy James Argue – production, arrangement, editing
- Todd Whitelock – engineering, mixing
- Dirk Overeem – engineering
- Chris Gold – additional engineering, mastering, editing
- Mark Wilder – mastering
- Ben Tonsley – design
- Kate Sterlin – photography
- Tom Korkidis – executive production

=== Orchestra ===
- Metropole Orkest – orchestra
- Jules Buckley – conductor
- Mariël Van Den Bos – alto flute, flute
- David Kweksilber – bass clarinet, clarinet
- Mathis Kaiser – bass trombone
- Evert Van Noort – bassoon, contrabassoon
- Annie Tangberg – cello
- Emile Visser – cello
- Gabriel Gonzalez Rodero – cello
- Jascha Albracht – cello
- Joel Siepmann – cello
- Leo Janssen – clarinet
- Benjamin De Boer – contrabass
- Florian Lansik – contrabass
- Esther Van Der Ploeg – English horn
- Maria Cristina Gonzalez Perez – flute
- Beate Loonstra – harp
- Fons Verspaandonk – horn
- Pieter Hunfeld – horn
- Vincent Van Wijk – oboe
- Frank Wardenier – percussion
- Georgi Tsenov – percussion
- Nikita Nikolova – percussion
- Maarten Combrink – trombone
- Ray Bruinsma – trumpet
- Rik Mol – trumpet
- Alex Welch – violin
- Danna Paternotte – violin
- David Peijnenborgh – violin
- Dennis Koenders – violin
- Ewa Zbyszynska – violin
- Ian De Jong – violin
- Iris Schut – violin
- Jasper VanRosmalen – violin
- Julia Jowell – violin
- Kardelen Buruk – violin
- Laura Kieboom – violin
- Leonid Nikishin – violin
- Marta Lemanska – violin
- Merel Jonker – violin
- Merel Junge – violin
- Norman Jansen – violin
- Pieternel Tils – violin
- Robert Baba – violin
- Rodrigo Bauza – violin
- Ruben Margarita – violin
- Vera Laporeva – violin
- Xaquin Carro Cribeiro – violin
