= The Subject Tonight Is Love =

Studio album by Kate McGarry, Keith Ganz and Gary Versace
- Released: 2018
- Recorded: May 2017
- Studio: Soundpure Studios, Durham, North Carolina
- Genre: Jazz
- Length: 61:04
- Label: Binxtown
- Producer: Keith Ganz, Kate McGarry, Garry Versace

Kate McGarry, Keith Ganz and Gary Versace chronology
Genevieve and Ferdinand (2014)	The Subject Tonight Is Love (2018)

The Subject Tonight Is Love is an album by Kate McGarry, Keith Ganz, and Gary Versace The album received a Grammy Award nomination in 2019 for Best Jazz Vocal Album. It was named after a poem by 14th Century poet Hafiz.

== Track listing ==
No.	Title	Length
1.	"Prologue: The Subject Tonight Is Love" (Ganz, Hafiz, Daniel Ladinsky)	1:16
2.	"Secret Love" (Sammy Fain, Paul Francis Webster)	5:04
3.	"Climb Down/Whisky You're the Devil" (McGarry, traditional)	6:46
4.	"Gone with the Wind" (Herb Magidson, Allie Wrubel)	4:19
5.	"Fair Weather" (Kenny Dorham)	8:01
6.	"Playing Palhaço" (Geraldo Carneiro, Egberto Gismonti, Jo Lawry)	4:46
7.	"Losing Strategy #4" (McGarry)	3:00
8.	"My Funny Valentine" (Richard Rodgers, Lorenz Hart)	6:23
9.	"Mr. Sparkle/What a Difference a Day Made" (Ganz, Stanley Adams, Maria Grever)	5:09
10.	"She Always Will/The River" (Steve Cardenas, Ganz, McGarry)	7:43
11.	"Indian Summer" (Al Dubin, Victor Herbert)	6:57
12.	"Epilogue: All You Need Is Love" (John Lennon, Paul McCartney)	1:40

== Personnel ==
- Kate McGarry – piano, vocals
- Keith Ganz – guitar, bass guitar, drums
- Gary Versace – accordion, keyboards
- Ron Miles – trumpet
- Obed Calvaire – drums
