= Denise Donatelli =

American jazz singer

- Born: Allentown, Pennsylvania, U.S.
- Genres: Jazz, vocal jazz
- Occupation: Singer
- Label: Savant
- Website: denisedonatelli.com

Denise Donatelli is an American jazz singer.

== Early life ==
Donatelli was born in Allentown, Pennsylvania. She began playing piano at the age of three and studied classical piano for 15 years, winning first place awards in the National Federation of Music Clubs' piano competitions three consecutive years. She graduated from Parkland High School. After college she set her musical career aside for marriage and family and did not begin singing professionally until her sons were in their teens.

== Musical career ==
In Atlanta, Donatelli was encouraged to return to music after attending a jam session that attracted the region's top players, including guitarist Russell Malone. She sang several songs with Russell, and began getting calls for performances. When blues singer Francine Reed joined Lyle Lovett's band, Donatelli joined the three-nights-a-week engagement at the Ritz-Carlton hotel.

Donatelli has toured and performed with Bill Cunliffe, Geoffrey Keezer, Bill Mays, Roger Kellaway, Tamir Hendelman, Larry Koonse, Julian Lage, Peter Sprague, Bob Sheppard, Joe LaBarbera, Marvin Smith, Christian Jacob's Big Band Theory, Alf Clausen and his Jazz Orchestra for the Simpsons, and the Stan Kenton Alumni Band. In addition, she is heard on pianist Bill Cunliffe's Christmas album That Time of Year (2011).

== Awards and honors ==
- 2011: When Lights Are Low, nominated for Grammy Award for Best Jazz Vocal Album
- 2012: Jazz Vocalist of the Year, Los Angeles Jazz Society
- 2012: Soul Shadows, nominated for Best Jazz Vocal Album
- 2016: Find a Heart, nominated for Best Jazz Vocal Album

== Discography ==
- In the Company of Friends (Jazzed Media, 2007)
- What Lies Within (Savant, 2008)
- When Lights Are Low (Savant, 2010)
- Soul Shadows (Savant, 2012)
- Find a Heart (Savant, 2015)
- Whistling in the Dark (Savant, 2021)
- Take My Breath Away (Savant, 2026)
