= The Big Noise (2012 film) =

- Directed by: Dominic Pelosi
- Written by: Andrew Pelosi
- Produced by: Dominic Pelosi
- Starring: Iain Hopkins; Michael Kennedy; Mario Marchioni
- Cinematography: Dominic Pelosi
- Edited by: Dominic Pelosi
- Release date: 2012
- Running time: 73 minutes
- Country: Australia
- Language: English

The Big Noise is a 2012 Australian film by Sydney-based director Dominic Pelosi and was written by Andrew Pelosi. The film was shot in and around Sydney's inner west and mainly features a cast of non professional actors. It was released in the United States in September 2012 and won multiple awards for direction, writing and acting.

== Plot summary ==
Morris faces challenges in sustaining his father's legal practice and anticipates a resolution to his difficulties upon inheriting assets from a terminally ill client. However, when the client experiences an unexpected recovery, Morris and his father devise a critical strategy that could either lead to their success or downfall.

== Cast ==
- Iain Hopkins as Kimon
- Michael Kennedy as Peter Barese
- Mario Marchioni as George Falzon
- Maurice Marshan as Morris Falzon
- Justin Restuccia as Father Napier
- William Tinkler as Jullian Fuller
