= The Window (Cécile McLorin Salvant album) =

Studio album by Cécile McLorin Salvant
- Released: September 28, 2018
- Venues: Sear Sound, The Village Vanguard, NYC
- Genre: Jazz
- Length: 1:10:14
- Label: Mack Avenue
- Producers: Al Pryor; Maria Ehrenreich

Cécile McLorin Salvant chronology
Dreams and Daggers (2017)	The Window (2018)	Ghost Song (2022)

The Window is a studio album by French-American jazz vocalist Cécile McLorin Salvant. She is accompanied by pianist Sullivan Fortner. The album was released on September 28, 2018 by Mack Avenue label, her fourth release for the label.

== Critical reception ==
Professional ratings
Aggregate scores
Source	Rating
Metacritic	84/100
Review scores
Source	Rating
All About Jazz	3.5/5 stars
AllMusic	4.5/5 stars
DownBeat	4/5 stars
Jazz Forum	5/5 stars
Jazzwise	4/5 stars
Pitchfork	7.8/10
PopMatters	7/10
Rolling Stone	4/5 stars
The Times	3/5 stars
Tom Hull	B+

Hank Shteamer of Rolling Stone wrote, "The most radical thing a jazz singer could do in 2018 is stick to the basics. One might expect Cécile McLorin Salvant, who picked up Best Jazz Vocal Album Grammys for each of her past two albums and is riding a wave of mainstream acclaim, to team with a buzzy producer or attempt some other kind of savvy crossover. But on The Window, the wise, virtuosic and subtly subversive 29-year-old singer opts for a setting so stark it can almost seem abstract..."

A Pitchfork review by Stephen M. Deusner noted, "Among Salvant’s most distinguishing artistic traits is how she makes those tonal shifts not just exciting but meaningful. Her craft is undeniable, but built into her craft is the freshness of encountering each tune as though for the first time, figuring it out in the moment from one note to the next. She sings in conversation with every song, its lyrics, and its historical context. Salvant accomplishes that not only by using her voice to comment on lyrics while she delivers them but also by developing a diverse, daring repertoire. On The Window, she sings French cabaret, American showtunes, pop standards, and deep soul and blues cuts."

Chris Willman of Variety observed, "This one is an album-length vocal/piano duet. But “minimalist” isn’t a word that will come to mind: Fortner is agreeably insane enough as a player that he doesn’t just sound like a full band, he sounds like two bands playing at once. And the frontwoman is the very farthest thing from a musical shrinking violet. There are quiet moments in “The Window,” but they're outweighed by the frantic ones, so if the stripped-down format suggests something polite, think again: McLorin Salvant and her accompanist are majestic and unhinged in equal measure."

== Track listing ==
Side A
No.	Title	Lyrics	Music	Length
1.	"Visions"	Stevie Wonder	Stevie Wonder	5:11
2.	"One Step Ahead"	Eddie Snyder; Charles Singleton	Eddie Snyder; Charles Singleton	2:09
3.	"By Myself"	Howard Dietz	Arthur Schwartz	2:34
4.	"The Sweetest Sounds"	Richard Rodgers	Richard Rodgers	4:55

Side B
No.	Title	Lyrics	Music	Length
5.	"Ever Since the One I Love’s Been Gone"	Buddy Johnson	Buddy Johnson	5:52
6.	"À clef"	Cécile McLorin Salvant	Cécile McLorin Salvant	2:05
7.	"Obsession"	Dori Caymmi; Tracy Mann; Gilson Peranzzetta	Dori Caymmi; Tracy Mann; Gilson Peranzzetta	3:10
8.	"Wild Is Love"	Dorothy Wayne; Ray Rusch	Dorothy Wayne; Ray Rusch	3:21
9.	"J'ai l'cafard"	Louis Daspax; Jean Eugene Charles Eblinger	Louis Daspax; Jean Eugene Charles Eblinger	3:00

Side C
No.	Title	Lyrics	Music	Length
10.	"Somewhere"	Stephen Sondheim	Leonard Bernstein	7:10
11.	"The Gentleman Is a Dope"	Oscar Hammerstein II	Richard Rodgers	4:29
12.	"Trouble Is a Man"	Alec Wilder	Alec Wilder	3:47
13.	"Were Thine That Special Face"	Cole Porter	Cole Porter	3:19

Side D
No.	Title	Lyrics	Music	Length
14.	"I've Got Your Number"	Carolyn Leigh	Cy Coleman	5:00
15.	"Tell Me Why"	Al Alberts	Martin Gold	3:28
16.	"Everything I've Got Belongs to You"	Lorenz Hart	Richard Rodgers	1:10
17.	"The Peacocks" (Melissa Aldana, tenor saxophone)	Norma Winstone	Jimmy Rowles	9:34

== Personnel ==
- Cécile McLorin Salvant, vocals
- Sullivan Fortner, piano, organ
- Melissa Aldana, tenor saxophone on “The Peacocks”
