= Emanuele Michetti =

- Born: Rome, Italy
- Occupations: Film director, screenwriter, editor, colorist

Emanuele Michetti is an Italian director, screenwriter, Film editor, and colorist. He lives in New York City.

He has produced narrative films, documentaries, music videos, and video art projects. With a focus on social issues such as mental illness, discrimination, gender equality, and minorities, his stories are mostly about loneliness and alienation in modern times, often featuring characters who are rejected by society and face internal struggles.

His films has been screened at festivals such as Cannes Film Festival, Montreal World Film Festival, the Academy Award Qualifying Urbanworld Film Festival, Turin Film festival.

== Filmography as director and screenwriter ==
| Year | Original title | English title | Notes | | | |
|---|---|---|---|---|---|---|
| Year | Original title | English title | Notes | 2005 | È invisibile agli Occhi | short film, video art 23 Torino Film Festival |
| 2007 | L'Aspirante | The Dreams Hoover | short film, narrative Best Screenplay and Best Actor Awards (Festival del Cinema Libero di Roma) Best Actress and Best Original Score (Corto Fiction Chianciano Terme) Best Actress (Festival Comicorto) Best Actress (Festival Comedy September) | | | |
| 2008 | La Quotidianità | | commercial Finalist at Enel Contest Future Film Festival | | | |
| 2008 | La Paura più Grande | The Loss | short film, narrative Best Original Score Award (Festival del Cinema Libero di Roma) 3rd Place Award (“I've Seen Films” International Short Film Festival Tiscali InShort) | | | |
| 2008 | House inAction | House inAction | short film, video art | | | |
| 2009 | Una Circostanza Fortuita | By Chance | short film, narrative Ecologico International Film Festival - Taurus Award 2009 Eye of the Web award (Festival Internazionale Cortolandria) Nominations Best Short Film and Spike Lee award (Babelgum Short Film Festival) | | | |
| 2012 | Frammenti [Scraps] | Scraps | short film, narrative Long Island International Film Expo - Triple Play Award (cinematography, editing, original score) 2012 Los Angeles New Wave International Film Festival - Honorable Mention 2012 SENE Film, Music & Arts Festival - Best Short Honorable Mention 2012 Chain NYC Film Festival - Best International Short 2012 Los Angeles Movie Awards - Honorable Mention 2012 IndieFEST Film Awards - Award of Merit 2102 International Independent Film Awards - Silver Award 2012 California Film Awards - Gold Award 2012 Prestige Film Award - Award of Merit 2012 Accolade Competition - Award of Merit 2012 | | | |
| 2014 | Love in the City | Love in the City | short film, video art | | | |
| 2014 | Broken Jam | Broken Jam | short film, narrative | | | |
| 2014 | A Chance, By Chance | A Chance, By Chance | short film, video art | | | |
| 2015 | The Blue Sound of New York | The Blue Sound of New York | documentary Best Short Documentary at New York Eurasian Film Festival Honorable Mention at SaMo Indie Santa Monica Independent Film Festival Aloha Accolade Award at Honolulu International Film Festival Bronze Palm Award at Mexico International Film Festival Silver Remi Award at 48th WorldFest Houston Nomination for Best Documentary at Bare Bones International Film Festival | | | |
| 2016 | Lilly's Secret | Lilly's Secret | short film, narrative World Premiere at the 20th Academy Award Qualifying Urbanworld Film Festival Best International Short Film - Roma Cinema Doc Best Drama Film - European Cinematography Awards Best Editing - AAB International Film Festival Best Cinematography - Care Film Festival - Monza, Italy Best Student Film - Mediterranean Film Festival Nomination Best Narrative Short - Blow Up, International Arthouse Film Fest (Chicago, USA) Nomination Best Short Film - Move Me Productions Belgium Short Film Festival (Belgium) | | | |
| 2016 | Addictions | Addictions | short film, narrative World Premiere at the 40th Montreal World Film Festival Best Cinematography at SENE Film, Music & Arts Festival Nomination Best Actress (Kaitlin Magowan) - Blow Up, International Arthouse Film Fest (Chicago, USA) Nomination Best Short Film - Move Me Productions Belgium Short Film Festival (Belgium) Nomination Best Cinematography - Filmstrip International Film Festival - Romania Nomination Best Student Film - Filmstrip International Film Festival - Romania | | | |
| 2017 | Yellow Water | Yellow Water | short film, narrative Best Experimental Film - Around International Film Festival (Berlin, Germany) Best Experimental Film - Gold Movie Awards (London, UK) Award of Excellence Best Experimental - IndieFEST Film Awards (La Jolla - CA, USA) | | | |
