= Cécile McLorin Salvant =

American jazz vocalist (born 1989)

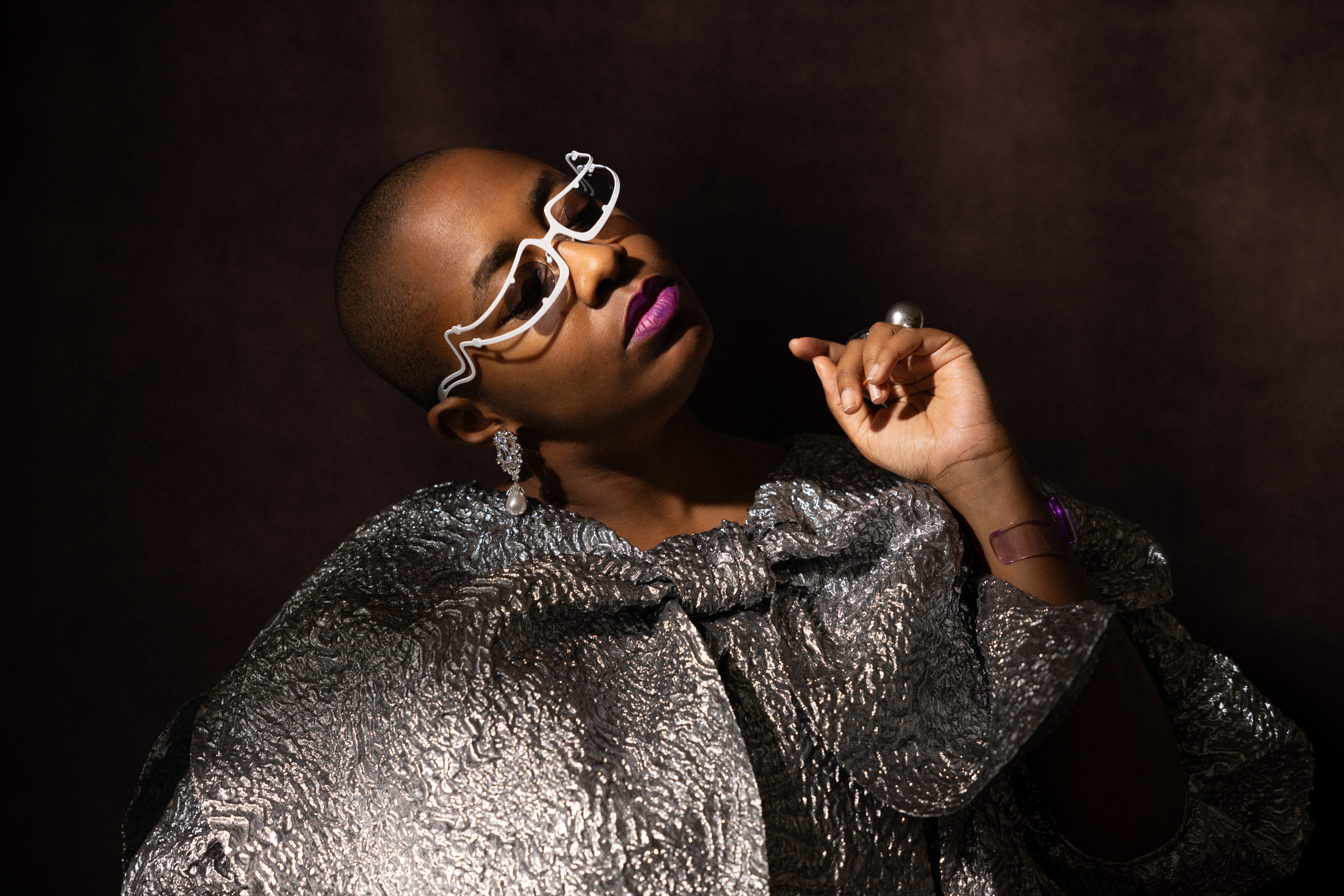
- Cecile McLorin Salvant by Ebru Yildiz

Background information
- Born: August 28, 1989 (age 36); Miami, Florida, U.S.
- Genres: Jazz
- Occupation: Musician
- Instruments: Vocals, Piano
- Labels: Mack Avenue; Justin Time; Nonesuch
- Website: cecilemclorinsalvant.com

Cécile McLorin Salvant (born August 28, 1989) is a French-American jazz singer-songwriter and composer. Salvant is one of the most highly regarded jazz vocalists of her generation, often winning DownBeat annual critics polls. She has released eight albums since 2010, six of which have been nominated for Grammy Awards. She is a 3-time winner of the Best Jazz Vocal Album Grammy Award for her 2015 album For One to Love, her 2017 album Dreams and Daggers, and her 2018 album The Window, each released on the Mack Avenue label. Salvant's most recent album is With Every Breath I Take, released in 2026 by Nonesuch Records. Salvant primarily sings in English or French, her first language, and has also recorded songs in Occitan and Haitian Kreyòl.

== Early years ==
Cécile Sophie McLorin Salvant was born in Miami, Florida in 1989. Her father, who is Haitian, is a doctor and her mother, who is French, is the founder and president of a French immersion school in Miami. Salvant began studies in classical piano at the age of five, and began singing in the Miami Choral Society when she was eight. She subsequently developed an interest in classical voice and began studying with private instructors, and later with Edward Walker, vocal teacher at the University of Miami. She said in 2015: "I was lucky enough to grow up in a house where we listened to all kinds of music. We listened to Haitian, hip hop, soul, classical, jazz, gospel and Cuban music, to name a few. When you have access to that as a child, it just opens up your world."

In 2007, Salvant moved to Aix-en-Provence, France, to study law as well as classical and baroque voice at the Darius Milhaud Conservatory. It was in Aix-en-Provence, with reedist and teacher Jean-François Bonnel, that she studied improvisation, instrumental and vocal repertoire, and sang with her first band.

In a four-star review of her sold-out engagement at Ronnie Scott's Club in London in June 2015, John Fordham wrote in The Guardian: "She brings ideas from unexpected angles to the familiar art of standards-singing, and she applies a mischievous intelligence to well-worn lyrics in ways that transform them."

== Musical career ==
Salvant began studying voice at the age of eight with an interest in classical music. She began her transition into jazz while studying at the Darius Milhaud Conservatory in 2007, and also studied composition and music theory at The New School . Salvant says that her main jazz influence is Sarah Vaughan, recalling childhood memories of listening to her songs repeatedly. While strongly influenced by Sarah Vaughan, she is also heavily influenced by vocalists such as Billie Holiday, Bessie Smith, and Betty Carter. She describes her sound as jazz, blues, with elements of folk and musical theatre. She composes music and lyrics which she also sings in French, her native language, as well as in Spanish. She enjoys popularity in Europe and in the United States, performing in clubs, concert halls, and festivals accompanied by renowned musicians. Salvant has performed at jazz venues and festivals including Ronnie Scott's, the Newport Jazz Festival in Rhode Island, the Festival international de Jazz de Montréal and the Village Vanguard.

In 2010, Salvant released her first album, Cécile & the Jean-François Bonnel Paris Quintet. Soon thereafter, at the age of 21, she went on to win the Thelonious Monk International Jazz Competition for vocalists. Her first-prize win included a recording contract with the label Mack Avenue Records, with whom she released her next five albums. Writing in The New York Times in 2012, Ben Ratliff said: "In front of a trio led by the pianist Aaron Diehl she sings clearly, with her full pitch range, from a pronounced low end to full and distinct high notes, used sparingly [...] Her voice clamps into each song, performing careful variations on pitch, stretching words but generally not scatting; her face conveys meaning, representing sorrow or serenity like a silent-movie actor."

In 2013 she released her second album, WomanChild, which was nominated for a 2014 Grammy Award in the category of Best Vocal Jazz Album. The songs chosen for WomanChild include original compositions, as well as compositions that date back to the 19th century and progress into the 21st. Salvant chose for this album songs she felt had a personal connection to her life.

In September 2015, Salvant released her second album with Mack Avenue Records, titled For One to Love. On this album, she chose songs that focus attention on strong women and independence. The album contains five original works and jazz standards. In 2016, the album won a Grammy for Best Vocal Jazz Album. Two years later, her third album with Mack Avenue, Dreams and Daggers, won a Grammy in the same category.

She has toured with the Jazz at Lincoln Center Orchestra, whose music director Wynton Marsalis was quoted in a 2017 New Yorker article as saying of Salvant: "You get a singer like this once in a generation or two."

In January 2023, Nonesuch Records announced the release of Salvant's seventh album. The album, titled Mélusine, recounts the European folk legend of Melusine and largely features songs sung in French and Haitian Creole. The album was released digitally on March 24, 2023.

Salvant has sung in advertisements for Chanel's "Chance" brand.

In June 2026, CBS News included Salvant's song "Take This Stone" in its list of the 250 essential American songs of the past 250 years.

Salvant's most recent, first orchestral album, With Every Breath I Take, coproduced and arranged by Darcy James Argue, and featuring the Metropole Orkest led by Jules Buckley, was released in 2026 by Nonesuch Records. She said that making album of its scale had been a dream of hers for many years. JazzTimes' critic Jordannah Elizabeth Graham-Mayer wrote that Salvant and Argue treated jazz standards like "Lush Life" not as finished monuments, but as fluid emotions rebuilt in real time. The album also includes other songs and standards like "Being Alive", the "Barbara Song", "Les Parapluies de Cherbourg", and only one song of her own, "Left Over".

== Awards and honors ==
- Thelonious Monk International Jazz Competition (2010)
- Jazz Album of the Year, DownBeat Critics Poll, WomanChild (2014)
- Best Vocal Jazz Album, Grammy Award nomination, WomanChild (2014)
- Top Vocal Album, NPR Music Jazz Critics Poll 2014, WomanChild,
- Female Vocalist of the Year, 2015, Jazz Journalists Association
- Top Vocal Album, NPR Music Jazz Critics Poll 2015, For One to Love
- Grammy Award for Best Jazz Vocal Album 2016, For One to Love
- Paul Acket Award 2016
- Grammy Award for Best Jazz Vocal Album 2018, Dreams and Daggers
- Jazz Album of the Year, DownBeat Critics Poll, Dreams and Daggers (2018)
- Grammy Award for Best Jazz Vocal Album 2019, The Window
- Glenn Gould Protege Prize Recipient, awarded by Jessye Norman at the Twelfth Glenn Gould Prize Gala (2019)
- MacArthur Genius Grant Winner (2020)
- Jazz Journalists Association's Jazz Award for Female Vocalist of the Year (2022)

== Discography ==
As lead artist

- Cécile & the Jean-François Bonnel Paris Quintet (2010)
- WomanChild (2013)
- For One to Love (2015)
- Dreams and Daggers (2017)
- The Window (2018)
- Ghost Song (2022)
- Mélusine (2023)
- Oh Snap (2025)
- With Every Breath I Take (2026)

Collaborations

- Jacky Terrasson, "Je te veux" and "Oh My Love" on Gouache (2012)
- It's Christmas on Mack Avenue (2014)
- Federico Britos Presents Hot Club of the Americas (2015)
- Jazz at Lincoln Center Orchestra, Big Band Holidays (2015)
- Fred Nardin, Jon Boutellier, Watt's (2016)
- Christian McBride, Without Further Ado, Vol 1 (2025)
