= Sullivan Fortner =

American jazz pianist

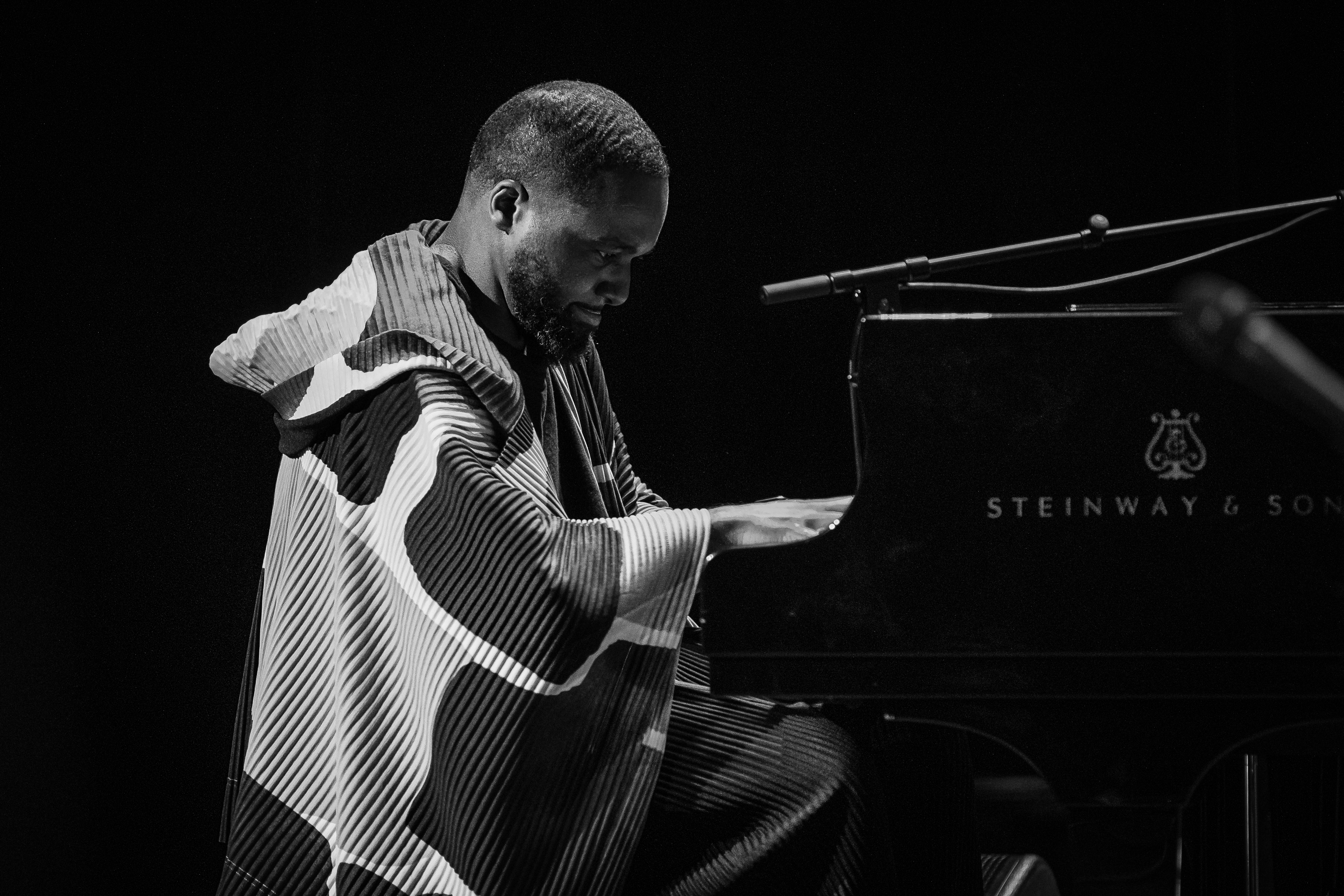
- Fortner at Kongsberg Musikkteater, 2024

Background information
- Born: December 29, 1986 (age 39); New Orleans, Louisiana, U.S.
- Genres: Jazz
- Occupations: Musician, composer
- Instrument: Piano
- Years active: 2000s–present
- Website: sullivanfortnermusic.com

Sullivan Joseph Fortner (born December 29, 1986) is an American jazz pianist. He was the regular pianist in trumpeter Roy Hargrove's band from 2010 to 2017, and has released two albums on Impulse! Records. He has received three Grammy Awards, including Best Jazz Performance for his collaboration with Samara Joy on the song "Twinkle Twinkle Little Me".

== Early life ==
Fortner was born and grew up in New Orleans. He started playing the piano from the age of four. He was inspired to play by seeing a woman playing the organ in a local church. His mother was the choir director of a Baptist church; he began playing the organ there at the age of seven. For a time, he relied on his perfect pitch to learn and play music; this had to change when he successfully auditioned for the New Orleans Center for Creative Arts.

== Education ==
Fortner went on to obtain a bachelor's degree from the Oberlin Conservatory of Music and a master's degree from the Manhattan School of Music.

== Later life and career ==
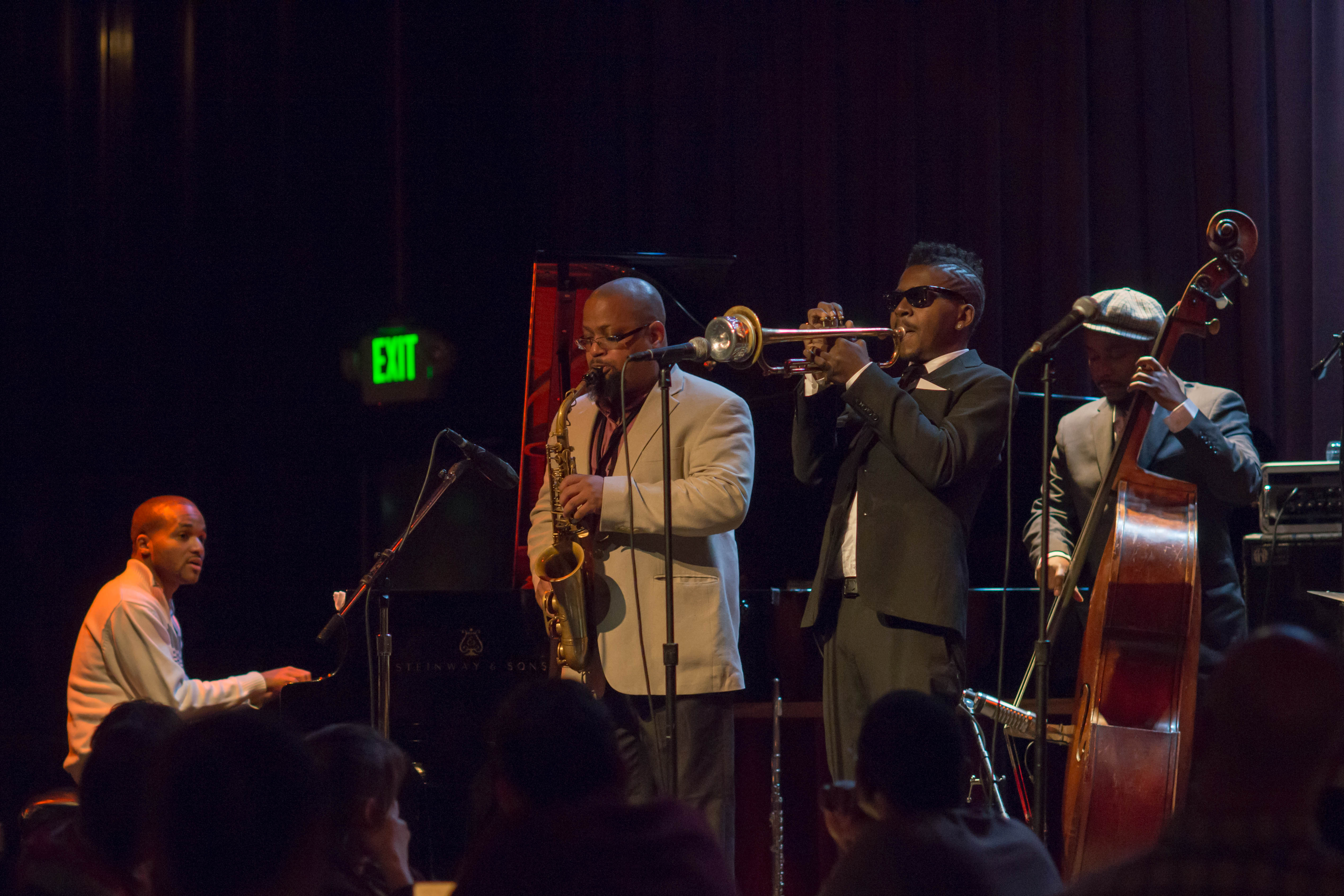
Fortner (left) with the Roy Hargrove Quintet

In 2009, Fortner was part of vibraphonist Stefon Harris' band, including for a tour of Europe. Fortner was pianist in trumpeter Roy Hargrove's quintet from 2010 to 2017. Fortner became strongly influenced by fellow pianist Barry Harris from 2011, when he realised that his knowledge of the music was too shallow. Fortner recorded with the Hargrove band's saxophonist, Justin Robinson, in 2013. In 2015, Fortner was the winner of the American Piano Awards Cole Porter Fellowship in Jazz, a prize that consists of "$50,000, the opportunity to record for Mack Avenue Records, and two years of professional career services and development".

In early 2015, Fortner's quartet contained saxophonist Tivon Pennicott, bassist Ameen Saleem and drummer Jeremy "Bean" Clemons. Fortner's first release as leader was Aria from Impulse! Records, and received a four-star review from DownBeat magazine. The next, Moments Preserved, was mainly a trio album, with Saleem and Clemons, but Hargrove also played on three of the tracks. Fortner played on some of the tracks that formed Paul Simon's album In the Blue Light.

At the 2026 Grammy Awards, Fortner was a winner for Best Jazz Instrumental Album for Southern Nights.

== Awards and honors ==
- 2016: Lincoln Center Award for Emerging Artists
- 2016: DownBeat magazine: "25 for the Future"
- 2020: DownBeat Critics' Poll, Rising Star Arranger
- 2026: The Gilmore's Larry J. Bell Jazz Artist Award

== Discography ==
An asterisk (*) indicates the year the album was released.

=== As leader ===
Year recorded	Title	Label	Personnel
2015*	Aria	Impulse!	Quartet, with Tivon Pennicott (tenor sax, soprano sax), Aidan Carroll (bass), Joe Dyson Jr. (drums)
2018*	Moments Preserved	Impulse!	Most tracks trio, with Ameen Saleem (bass), Jeremy "Bean" Clemons (drums); three tracks quartet, with Roy Hargrove added
2018	Tea for Two		Duo, with Kyle Athayde (vibraphone)
2021–22	Solo Game	Artwork	Solo (Fortner plays piano, Hammond B3, Fender Rhodes, vocoder, carillon, celesta, drum set, percussion, etc.)
2023	Southern Nights	Artwork	Trio, with Peter Washington (bass), Marcus Gilmore (drums)
2023	Leave That In There	Artwork	Trio, with Tyrone Allen II (bass), Kayvon Gordon (drums)

=== As sideman ===
Year recorded	Leader	Title	Label
2007*	Theo Croker	The Fundamentals	Left Sided Music
2009*	Clyde Kerr Jr.	This Is Now	
2010*	Donald Harrison	Quantum Leaps	Fomp
2011*	Etienne Charles	Kaiso	Culture Shock
2011	Lauren Henderson	Lauren Henderson	Brontosaurus
2011*	Arnold Lee	Arnold Lee Quartet	Leeandthem
2011	Theo Croker	Afro Physicist	OKeh/DDB
2012*	Truan Savage	Five Colors	
2013	Justin Robinson	Alana's Fantasy	Criss Cross Jazz
2015	Lauren Henderson	A La Madrugada	Brontosaurus
2015*	Paul Jones	Short History	Blu Jazz
2016	Cécile McLorin Salvant	Dreams and Daggers	Mack Avenue
2017*	Guilhem Flouzat	A Thing Called Joe	Sunnyside
2018	Lauren Henderson	Ármame	Brontosaurus
2018*	Paul Simon	In the Blue Light	Legacy
2018*	Cécile McLorin Salvant	The Window	Mack Avenue
2019	Lauren Henderson	Alma Oscura	Brontosaurus
2019*	Lage Lund	Terrible Animals	Criss Cross Jazz
2020	Lauren Henderson	The Songbook Session	Brontosaurus
2020	Lauren Henderson	Classic Christmas	Brontosaurus
2020	Peter Bernstein	What Comes Next	Smoke Sessions
2020–21	Cécile McLorin Salvant	Ghost Song	Nonesuch
2021	Lauren Henderson	Musa	Brontosaurus
2022*	Melissa Aldana	12 Stars	Blue Note
2022*	Mike Moreno	Standards From Film	Criss Cross Jazz
2023	Samara Joy	A Joyful Holiday	Verve
2026	Cécile McLorin Salvant	With Every Breath I Take	Nonesuch
