= Aaron Diehl =

American jazz pianist and composer

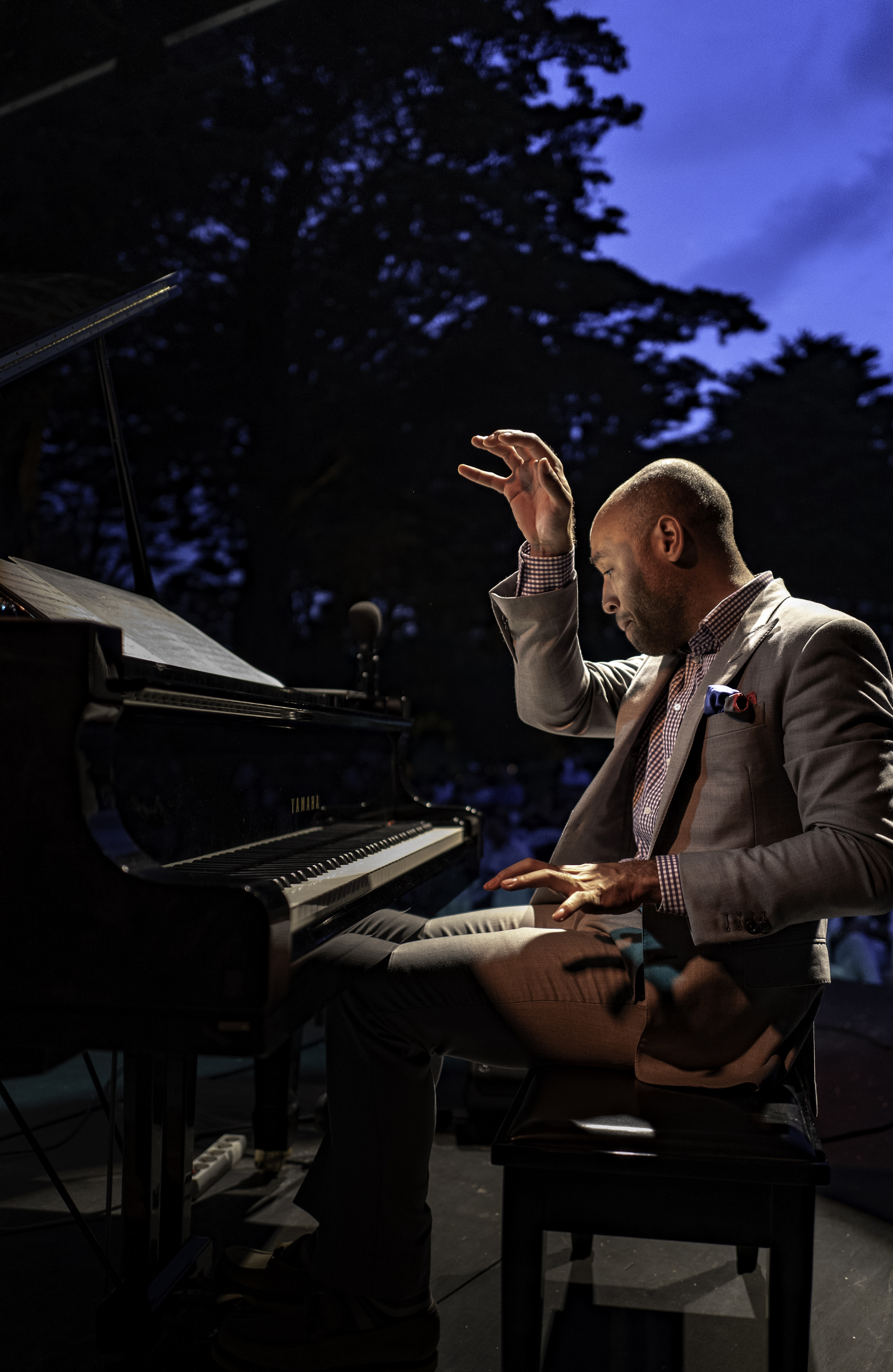
- Diehl performing at the 2019 International Jazz Festival of Punta del Este

Background information
- Born: Aaron Diehl; September 22, 1985 (age 41)
- Origin: Columbus, Ohio, US
- Genre: Jazz
- Occupation: Pianist
- Years active: 2007–present
- Label: Mack Avenue
- Website: www.aarondiehl.com

Aaron Diehl (/diːl/; born September 22, 1985) is an American jazz pianist and composer.

He was the 2014 Monterey Jazz Festival Commission Artist and composed Three Streams of Expression, dedicated to pianist and composer John Lewis. He was the 2013 recipient of the Jazz Journalists Association Award for Up-And-Coming Artist, the 2012 Prix du Jazz Classique recipient for his album Live at the Players from the Académie du Jazz, and was the winner of the 2011 Cole Porter Fellowship from the American Piano Awards.

== Biography ==
Diehl grew up in a nurturing musical environment in the King-Lincoln Bronzeville neighborhood of Columbus, Ohio. His grandfather, pianist/trombonist Arthur Baskerville, was one of his first influences. Diehl would eventually become the organist at his family's Black Catholic church, St. Dominic's.

Diehl began studying classically at age 7 and discovered his passion for jazz music when attending Interlochen Summer Camp. There, he met piano prodigy Eldar Djangirov, who made a lasting impression on Diehl through his enthusiasm for Oscar Peterson and Art Tatum.

In 2002, Diehl was a finalist in Jazz at Lincoln Center's Essentially Ellington competition, where he was awarded "Outstanding Soloist". The following year, he was invited to tour with the Wynton Marsalis Septet on their European tour. A 2007 graduate of the Juilliard School, he studied with Kenny Barron, Oxana Yablonskaya and Eric Reed.

Diehl released his first live album in 2009, a solo concert recorded at the Caramoor Festival. In 2010, Live at the Players featured two of his trios: David Wong and Paul Sikivie (bass), and Quincy Davis and Lawrence Leathers (drums). The Bespoke Man's Narrative (2013), Diehl's debut album on Mack Avenue Records, reached No. 1 on the JazzWeek Jazz Chart and is described as "honest music that invites you back in to discover new wonders with each listening." Diehl's 2015 album Space, Time, Continuum featured Benny Golson and Joe Temperley.

Diehl has toured with vocalist Cécile McLorin Salvant. Others he has performed with include: Warren Wolf, Lew Tabackin, Matt Wilson, Wycliffe Gordon, the Jazz at Lincoln Center Orchestra and the New World Symphony.

== Personal life ==
Diehl lives in Harlem and is a licensed pilot. He is a graduate of St. Charles Preparatory School.

Diehl is Catholic.

== Discography ==
=== As leader ===
Year recorded	Year released	Title	Label	Notes
2008	2009	Live at Caramoor	(Self-released)	Solo piano; in concert
	2010	Live at The Players	(Self-released)	Trio, with David Wong and Paul Sikivie (bass; separately), Quincy Davis and Lawrence Leathers (drums; separately); in concert
	2013	The Bespoke Man's Narrative	Mack Avenue	Some tracks trio, with David Wong (bass), Rodney Green (drums); most tracks quartet, with Warren Wolf (vibraphone) added
	2015	Space Time Continuum	Mack Avenue	Some tracks trio, with David Wong (bass), Quincy Davis (drums); some tracks quartet, with Joe Temperley (baritone sax) or Stephen Riley (tenor sax) added; some tracks quintet, with Bruce Harris (trumpet) and Benny Golson (tenor sax) added; one track sextet, with Charanee Wade (vocals), Harris, and Golson added
2019	2020	The Vagabond	Mack Avenue	Trio, with Paul Sikivie (bass), Gregory Hutchinson (drums)
2022	2023	Zodiac Suite	Mack Avenue	With David Wong (bass), Aaron Kimmel (drums), the Knights; guests Brandon Lee (trumpet), Evan Christopher (clarinet), Nicole Glover (tenor sax), Mikaela Bennett (vocals)

=== Compilations ===
- 2013 – Live From The Detroit Jazz Festival – 2013 (Mack Avenue)
- 2014 – It's Christmas on Mack Avenue (Mack Avenue)
