= Laurence Hobgood =

American musician (born 1959)

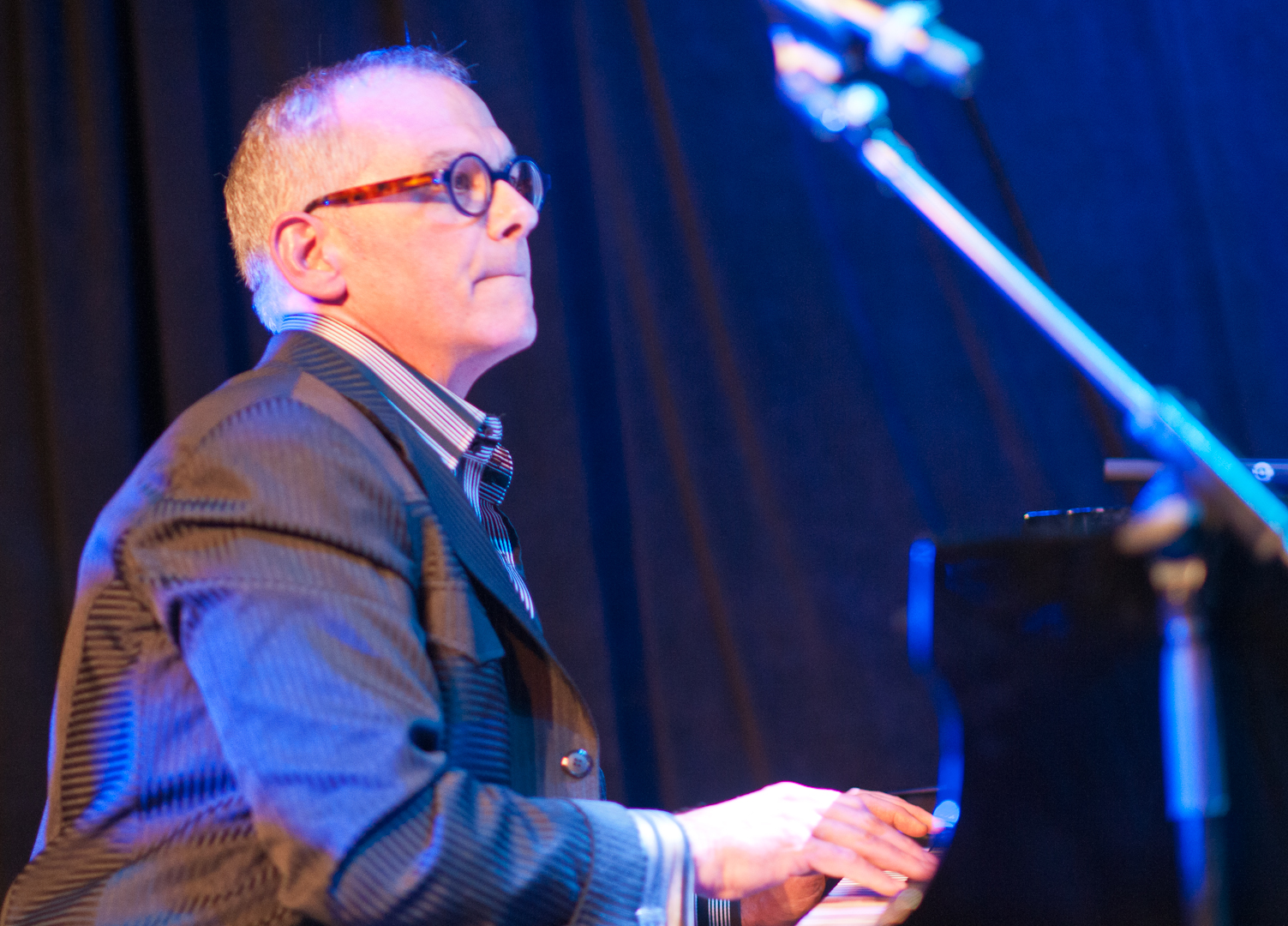
- Hobgood performing in 2012

Background information
- Born: December 23, 1959 (age 66); Salisbury, North Carolina, US
- Genre: Jazz
- Occupations: pianist, producer, songwriter, educator, composer
- Instrument: Piano
- Years active: 1992–present
- Labels: Blue Note, Concord, Naim, Circumstantial Productions
- Website: laurencehobgood.com

Laurence Hobgood (born December 23, 1959) is an American contemporary jazz pianist, composer, arranger, producer, lyricist and educator. Perhaps best known for his twenty-year collaboration with vocalist Kurt Elling, he is identified by many as a key player in the imaginative updating of the "American Songbook", particularly in his arranging for vocalists.

== Early life and education ==
Born December 23, 1959, in Salisbury, North Carolina, Laurence Hobgood is the son of Burnet Mclean and Jane Bishop Hobgood. His father was the director of the Theater Department at Catawba College. The family moved to Ithaca, New York, where his father earned his Ph.D., then again to Dallas, Texas, in 1964 where Burnet served as Chairman of the Southern Methodist University (SMU) Department of Theater. Hobgood attended Lakewood Elementary School and J.L. Long Junior High School. He also began piano study. In 1975 the Hobgoods moved to Urbana, Illinois, where Burnet assumed the Chair of the Theater program at University of Illinois. During high school, Hobgood studied jazz with Tony Caramia, a new professor in piano pedagogy. In 1978, after entering the University of Illinois Music Department, Hobgood returned to classical study with British pianist Ian Hobson. Hobgood chose to leave school after two and a half years and dedicate himself solely to jazz practice, both playing and composing/arranging.

== Career ==
In 1988 Hobgood moved to Chicago. After some time getting established in the jazz scene, he was invited to join the regular Monday night band (led by Ed Peterson) at the Green Mill Cocktail Lounge, he started playing with drummer Paul Wertico and he was invited to play in the resident jazz ensemble of the Aspen Music Festival.

In 1993 he met a young Kurt Elling. Hobgood served as Elling’s music director producing, playing on, and composing/arranging for Elling’s first ten records (six for Blue Note and four for Concord.) All ten were Grammy nominated and Hobgood received two nominations for his arranging on "Flirting With Twilight" and "Dedicated To You". Hobgood received a 2009 Grammy award for his work as producer on "Dedicated To You".

The Chicago Tribune honored him as a 1995 Chicagoan of the Year in the Arts. In 2003 he received a Deems Taylor Award, given by ASCAP for the year's outstanding music journalism, for his article, “The Art Of The Trio”, published by JazzTimes magazine.

Hobgood's 2007 CD, When The Heart Dances (Naim), was a duet recording with bassist Charlie Haden. Hobgood's February 2012 release, PoemJazz is a collaboration with poet Robert Pinsky. It features Pinsky's energetic readings of his poems with an emphasis on musical phrasing coupled with Hobgood's improvised accompaniment, played live in studio. House Hour: PoemJazz II was released by Circumstantial Productions in 2013.

Hobgood's 2012 CD, Laurence Hobgood Quartet Featuring Ernie Watts (Circumstantial Productions), was recorded live at the Jazz Kitchen in Indianapolis. Hobgood's 2013 release, Christmas, was chosen by The New York Times and The Chicago Tribune as one of the top holiday CDs of the year. In April and May 2014 Hobgood began a new collaboration with Chicago vocalist Tammy McCann, arranging, playing and producing her "Love Stories" project. In December 2014, Hobgood recorded a new trio project, Honor Thy Fathers, with bassist John Patitucci and drummer Kendrick Scott, scheduled for September 2015, release.

== Discography ==
- Left To My Own Devices (Naim, 2000)
- Crazy World (Naim, 2005)
- When The Heart Dances featuring Charlie Haden (Naim, 2009)
- POEMJAZZ duet with Robert Pinsky (Circumstantial Productions, 2012)
- Laurence Hobgood Quartet Live feat. Ernie Watts (Circumstantial Productions, 2012)
- Christmas (Circumstantial Productions, 2013)

=== Pianist, musical director, producer, arranger ===
- No One Ever Tells You (1992) Eden Atwood
- Castle Creek Shuffle (1995) Jeff Benedict
- Close Your Eyes (1995) Kurt Elling
- The Messenger (1997) Kurt Elling
- Union (1997) co-op trio with Paul Wertico and Brian Torff
- This Time It's Love (1998) Kurt Elling
- State Of The Union (1999) co-op trio with Paul Wertico and Brian Torff
- Live In Chicago (2000) Kurt Elling
- Flirting With Twilight (2001) Kurt Elling
- Man in the Air (2003) Kurt Elling
- Split Decision (2004) Jim Gailloreto
- Love Is Blue (2004) Jackie Allen
- Tangled (2006) Jackie Allen
- Nightmoves (2007) Kurt Elling
- Dedicated to You: Kurt Elling Sings the Music of Coltrane and Hartman (2009) Kurt Elling
- Quartet (2009) Rob Parton
- The Gate (2011) Kurt Elling
- 1619 Broadway - The Brill Building Project (2012) Kurt Elling
- Southern Comfort (2014) Regina Carter
- Love Stories (2014) Tammy McCann
- Timeless (2014) Alicia Olatuja
- It's a Man's World (2015) Carter Calvert
- Shelter from the Storm (2016) Barb Jungr

== Awards and nominations ==
Grammy Awards

| Year | Nominee / work | Award | Result |
|---|---|---|---|
| 2001 | Flirting with Twilight Kurt Elling | Best Jazz Vocal Album | Nominated |
| 2001 | "Easy Living" | Best Instrumental Arrangement Accompanying a Vocalist | Nominated |
| 2009 | Dedicated to You Kurt Elling | Best Jazz Vocal Album | Won |
| 2009 | Dedicated to You Kurt Elling | Best Instrumental Arrangement Accompanying a Vocalist | Nominated |

Other awards

| Year | Nominee / work | Award | Result |
|---|---|---|---|
| 2009 | "The Art of The Trio" JazzTimes Magazine | ASCAP Outstanding Music Journalism | Won |
