= The Messenger (Kurt Elling album) =

Studio album by Kurt Elling
- Released: April 8, 1997
- Recorded: July 1994 – December 1996
- Studios: Tone Zone Recording, Chicago, IL
- Genre: Vocal jazz
- Length: 54:54
- Label: Blue Note
- Producers: Laurence Hobgood, Kurt Elling, (Paul Wertico)

Kurt Elling chronology
Close Your Eyes (1995)	The Messenger (1997)	This Time It's Love (1998)

The Messenger is the second studio album by Kurt Elling. Like Close Your Eyes (and the following) the album was released by Blue Note, the production credits lie with pianist Laurence Hobgood, Elling himself and drummer Paul Wertico as co-producer. Hobgood, bassist Rob Amster and Wertico are co-billed on the album cover, establishing the piano trio –led by Hobgood up to 1619 Broadway from 2012– as the singers core backing. Amster and Wertico are nevertheless replaced on some tracks by Eric Hochberg (already known from Close Your Eyes) and percussionist Jim Widlowski. A further voice is added on half of the tracks, trumpet player Orbert Davis, tenor saxophonists Edward Petersen or Eddie Johnson, and on one track literally, with Cassandra Wilson on "Time of the Season". On this song and part of the so-called 'Suite' one can also hear a guitarist, who unfortunately is not mentioned in the album credits. Besides The Zombies 1967 hit The Messenger introduces "Nature Boy" to Ellings' repertoire, two further jazz standards, an interpretation of Jimmy Heath's "Gingerbread Boy", played even more aggressively and faster than Miles Davis (on Miles Smiles), and "Tanya" (here named "Tanya Jean" ) written by Donald Byrd, who recorded the tune only once in 1964 for Dexter Gordon's album One Flight Up. The song is informed by an ostinato of moody open chords played on piano (evoking the John Coltrane Quartet) resolved occasionally by a rather conventional hard bop theme. All other tracks are penned by the musicians themselves or even improvised like "It's Just a Thing" accompanying a story Elling declaims.

== Reception ==
Professional ratings
Review scores
Source	Rating
Allmusic	4/5 stars
The Penguin Guide to Jazz Recordings	4/4 stars

The Allmusic review by Scott Yanow awarded the album four stars, and described it as "one of the most interesting jazz vocal sets to be released in 1997...Elling covers a wide range of music, continually taking chances and coming up with fresh approaches...This rewarding and continually intriguing set is particularly recommended to listeners who feel that jazz singing has not progressed much beyond bop"

== Track listing ==
First Set

1. "Nature Boy" (eden ahbez) - 6:09
2. "April in Paris" (Vernon Duke, Yip Harburg) - 5:10

Suite
3. "Beauty of All Things" (Laurence Hobgood, Kurt Elling) - 8:08
4. "The Dance" (Hobgood) - 1:34
5. "Prayer for Mr. Davis" (Hobgood, Elling) - 6:03

6. "Endless" (Edward Petersen) - 4:48

Second Set

7. "Tanya Jean" (Donald Byrd, Elling) - 10:17
8. "It's Just a Thing" (Hobgood, Eric Hochberg, Paul Wertico, story by Elling) - 4:31
9. "Gingerbread Boy" (Jimmy Heath) - 5:03
10. "Prelude to a Kiss" (Duke Ellington, Irving Gordon, Irving Mills) - 5:27
11. "Time of the Season" (Rod Argent, arranged by Elling and Hobgood) - 5:53
12. "The Messenger" (Petersen, Elling) - 9:03

== Personnel ==
- Kurt Elling - vocals
- Laurence Hobgood - piano, synthesizer (tracks 4, 11)
- Rob Amster - double bass (except 6–8, 11), electric bass (6)
- Eric Hochberg - acoustic bass (7, 8, 11)
- Paul Wertico - drums (exc. 6, 10, 12), percussion (2–4, 11)
- Jim Widlowski - drums (6, 12), percussion (2, 11)
- Orbert Davis - trumpet (2), flugelhorn (5)
- Edward Petersen - tenor saxophone (6, 12)
- Eddie Johnson - tenor saxophone (10)
- Cassandra Wilson - vocals (11)
- Dave Onderdonk - guitar (2, 4, 11)

Production

- Laurence Hobgood and Kurt Elling - producers
- Paul Wertico - co-producer
- Roger Heiss - engineer, mixing
- Ed Blalach - assistant engineer
- Danny Kopelson - recording engineer for vocals on 11 (at Sear Sound, New York, Nov. 11, 1996)
- Patrick Roques - design
- Nellery Hill - cover illustration
- William Claxton - photography
