= Man in the Air =

Studio album by Kurt Elling
- Released: July 22, 2003
- Recorded: January 13–17, 2003
- Studio: CRC, Chicago
- Genre: Vocal jazz
- Label: Blue Note
- Producer: Kurt Elling, Laurence Hobgood with Bill Traut

Kurt Elling chronology
Flirting with Twilight (2001)	Man in the Air (2003)	Nightmoves (2007)

Professional ratings
Review scores
Source	Rating
Allmusic	4/5 stars
Penguin Guide to Jazz Recordings	4/4 stars
PopMatters	(not rated)

Man in the Air is the sixth album by jazz vocalist Kurt Elling, recorded and released in 2003 by Blue Note Records.

== Musicians and music ==
As for all the previous albums Elling is accompanied by a piano trio led by his musical partner Laurence Hobgood, bassist Rob Amster and with Frank Parker Jr. a new drummer again. Paul Wertico, formerly behind the drum set, is only heard on the first track. The "sonic idea" for the album was to add vibraphonist Stefon Harris who appears now on several tracks and is named on the album cover. Furthermore soprano saxophonists Jim Gailloreto and Brad Wheeler perform as guest musicians. On some tracks Elling uses overdubs of his voice.

Seven of the twelve tracks are adaptations of originally instrumental compositions to which Elling wrote lyrics to, most prominently John Coltrane's "Resolution" from his epic cycle A Love Supreme. Besides "Resolution" and "A Secret I", i.e. Herbie Hancock's "Alone and I" from his debut Takin' Off, the entry track "Minuano" written by Pat Metheny and Lyle Mays (from Metheny's Still Life (Talking)) formed the basic material for Man in the Air, initially should have been the opener for This Time It's Love, but the label convinced the musicians that it did not fit the album's character, it was "too futurist for this side" as Elling put it in hindsight.

The other compositions Elling and Hobgood adapted were by Joe Zawinul ("Time to Say Goodbye", i.e. "A Remark You Made" from Heavy Weather), Courtney Pine ("Higher Vibe" from Underground) and Bobby Watson ("Hidden Jewel" from Jewel). The last track of the album, "All Is Quiet", a duo by Elling and Hobgood, is a composition by Bob Mintzer, who already recorded the song together with Elling in 1998 on The Yellowjackets album Club Nocturne and in 2002 with the Bob Mintzer Big Band (Live at MCG with Special Guest Kurt Elling).

== Reception ==
"This is perhaps the jazz vocal album of the last decade. Almost ten years on from his debut, Elling delivers a bold and accomplished performance, marked by highly original choice of material and some devastating playing from his regular band", write Richard Cook and Brian Morton in their Penguin Guide to Jazz. "Elling's scat and his delivery of a ballad are now so confident that he is able to take on material like John Coltrane's 'Resolution' and bring to it a genuine philosophical understanding as well as a musically coherent performance." In 2006 they concluded: "This is a remarkable record, as accessible as it is challenging." In their definitive Penguin Jazz Guide from 2010 they did not change any of the review but went even further closing: "It is so good, it's almost sinful."

Thom Jurek of AllMusic is equally eloquent in his praise and stresses too Elling's mature interpretation of "Resolution" while also recognizing "a new way" for listeners to access the composer John Coltrane. And like Cook and Morton he sees the importance of Laurence Hobgood: "Hobgood is a criminally under-recognized pianist. His sense of harmonic architecture and melodic invention are among the most innovative of the current grown-up generation of jazz players, and his allowance for space and nuance acts as a perfect foil for Elling's rigorous restructuring of intervals and cadences."

Howard Reich of the Chicago Tribune praised the album as one of the year's very best, writing that "the luster of Elling’s vocals, the nimbleness of his scat technique, the plaintive quality of his lyrics and the ingenuity of his vocalese reaffirm Elling’s position as the pre-eminent male vocalist of the under-40 generation."

Man in the Air received a Grammy Award for Best Jazz Vocal Album, the sixth successive nomination in that category since Elling's debut and seventh nomination in total.

== Track listing ==
1. "Minuano (Vocal Version)" (Pat Metheny, Lyle Mays, Kurt Elling) – 7:53
2. "In the Winelight" (William Eaton, Elling, Phil Gladston) – 6:38
3. "Resolution" (John Coltrane, Elling) – 6:51
4. "Time to Say Goodbye" – (Joe Zawinul, Elling) – 6:43
5. "The Uncertainty of the Poet" (Cary John Franklin, Wendy Cope) – 1:09
6. "The More I Have You" (Kurt Elling) – 3:38
7. "Man in the Air" (Laurence Hobgood, Elling) – 5:32
8. "A Secret I" (Herbie Hancock, Elling) – 6:24
9. "Higher Vibe" (Courtney Pine, Elling) – 6:35
10. "Hidden Jewel" (Bobby Watson, Elling) – 5:45
11. "Never My Love" (Donald and Richard Addrisi) – 3:40
12. "All Is Quiet" (Bob Mintzer, Elling) – 6:26

== Personnel ==
- Kurt Elling – vocals
- Jim Gailloreto – soprano saxophone
- Brad Wheeler – soprano saxophone
- Laurence Hobgood – piano, Rhodes electric piano
- Stefon Harris – vibraphone
- Rob Amster – double bass, bass guitar
- Frank Parker Jr. – drums and percussion
- Paul Wertico – drums
