= Live in Chicago (Kurt Elling album) =

Live album by Kurt Elling
- Released: 1999
- Recorded: July 14–16, 1999
- Venue: Green Mill, Chicago
- Genre: Vocal jazz
- Length: 71:10
- Label: Blue Note
- Producer: Laurence Hobgood, Kurt Elling

Kurt Elling chronology
This Time it's Love (1998)	Live in Chicago (1999)	Flirting with Twilight (2001)

Professional ratings
Review scores
Source	Rating
Allmusic	4.5/5 stars
The Penguin Guide to Jazz Recordings	4/4 stars

Live in Chicago is a 1999 live album by jazz vocalist Kurt Elling. It was Elling's first live album, recorded over two nights in 1999 at Chicago's Green Mill jazz club. Vocalist and composer Jon Hendricks appears on two tracks, "Don't Get Scared" and "Goin' to Chicago." "The Rent Party" features Elling's interplay with three tenor saxophonists, Von Freeman, Ed Petersen and Eddie Johnson. In addition, percussionist Kahil El'Zabar is featured on two tracks.

Live in Chicago received a Grammy Award for Best Jazz Vocal Album, the fourth nomination in a row since Elling's debut.

== Track listing ==
1. "Downtown" (Russell Ferrante) – 3:50
2. "My Foolish Heart" (Victor Young, Ned Washington) – 12:17
3. "Smoke Gets in Your Eyes" (Jerome Kern, Otto Harbach) – 8:29
4. "Oh My God" (Sting) – 3:51
5. "Night Dream" (Wayne Shorter, Kurt Elling) – 9:00
6. "(I Love You) For Sentimental Reasons" (William Best, Deek Watson) – 5:19
7. Intro to "Esperanto" – 1:44
8. "Esperanto" (Vince Mendoza, Elling) – 5:16
9. "Don't Get Scared" (Stan Getz, King Pleasure, Jon Hendricks) – 3:40
10. Intro to "Goin' to Chicago" – 0:45
11. "Goin' to Chicago" (Traditional) – 5:40
12. Intro to "The Rent Party" – 0:45
13. "The Rent Party" (Ed Petersen, Elling) – 8:20
14. "Blues Chaser" (Rob Amster, Elling, Laurence Hobgood, Michael Raynor) – 1:28

Out Takes Album (2000)

1. "Resolution" (John Coltrane, Elling) – 7:18
2. "What I Meant to Say Was..." (Hobgood) – 4:53
3. "Moon and Sand (Inspired by Keith Jarrett)" (Alec Wilder, Morty Palitz, William Engvick) – 6:44
4. "Dolores Dream" (Shorter, Elling – Including: "An Extemporaneous Prolegomenon to Any Future Extraneous Thought on the Subject of Mirrors" by Elling) – 16:35
5. "Renaissance of the Resistance" (Kahil El'Zabar) – 6:34

Bonus track

6. "Senor Blues 2000 (The Alien Version)" studio recording (Horace Silver, Bill Henderson) – 4:23

== Personnel ==
- Kurt Elling - vocals
- Laurence Hobgood - piano
- Rob Amster - acoustic bass
- Michael Raynor - drums, percussion (track 4)

Featured guest artists

- Kahil El'Zabar - hand drums (4), percussion and voice (Outtakes 5)
- Jon Hendricks - vocals (9–11)
- Von Freeman, Ed Petersen, Eddie Johnson - tenor saxophone (13)

For Outtakes bonus studio track

- Kurt Elling and Tess Marsalis - voices (Outtakes 6)
- Matthew Backer - all other sounds, arranger and producer
- Eddie Krakaur - recording and mixing (2 Ton Sound, New York)

Production

- Laurence Hobgood and Kurt Elling - producer
- Fran Allen Leake - production assistant
- Danny Leake - recording engineer, mixing and mastering
- Tim Powell - recording assistant
- Steve Johnson - mixing and mastering assistant
