= Paul Wertico =

American drummer (born 1953)

Background information
- Born: January 5, 1953 (age 73); Chicago, Illinois, U.S.
- Genres: Jazz, jazz fusion, rock
- Occupations: Musician, educator, producer
- Instruments: Drums, percussion
- Years active: 1968–present
- Formerly of: Pat Metheny Group, Marbin, SBB, Wertico Cain & Gray
- Website: www.paulwertico.com

Paul Wertico (born January 5, 1953, in Chicago, Illinois) is an American drummer. He gained recognition as a member of the Pat Metheny Group from 1983 until 2001, leaving the group to spend more time with his family and to pursue other musical interests.

== Music career ==
=== Groups ===
After Pat Metheny heard the Simon & Bard Group with Wertico and bassist Steve Rodby, he invited both to join his band. During his time with Metheny, Wertico played on ten albums and four videos, appeared on television, and toured around the world. He won seven Grammy Awards (for "Best Jazz Fusion Performance," "Best Contemporary Jazz Performance," and "Best Rock Instrumental Performance"), magazine polls, and received several gold records.

He formed the Paul Wertico Trio with John Moulder and Eric Hochberg and collaborated with Larry Coryell, Kurt Elling, and Jeff Berlin. From 2000 to 2007, he was a member of SBB, the platinum-record-winning Polish progressive rock band. Wertico was a member of the Larry Coryell Power Trio until Coryell's death in 2017.

In 2009, Wertico became a member of the jazz-rock group Marbin with Israeli musicians Danny Markovitch and Dani Rabin. The group performed as Paul Wertico's Mid-East/Mid-West Alliance and recorded an album for the Chicago Sessions label that received accolades from the Chicago Tribune, DRUM!, and Modern Drummer.

Wertico formed Wertico Cain & Gray with multi-instrumentalists David Cain and Larry Gray. Their debut album Sound Portraits (2013) won Best Live Performance Album in the 13th Annual Independent Music Awards, and their fourth album Realization (2015) was nominated for Best Live Performance Album and Best Long Form Video in the 15th Annual Independent Music Awards.

=== Appearances and other work ===
Wertico played drums on Paul Winter's 1990 Grammy-nominated album, Earth: Voices of a Planet. He played on vocalist Kurt Elling's 1995 Grammy-nominated album, Close Your Eyes, as well as Elling's 1997 Grammy-nominated album, The Messenger, 1998 Grammy-nominated album, This Time It's Love, and 2003 Grammy-nominated album, Man in the Air.

Some of the many other artists Paul has played with: Eddie Harris, Lee Konitz, Dave Liebman, Sam Rivers, Bob Mintzer, Terry Gibbs, Buddy DeFranco, Roscoe Mitchell, Evan Parker, Jay McShann, Herbie Mann, Lew Tabackin, Randy Brecker, Sonny Fortune, Paolo Fresu, George Coleman, Diane Schuur, Ira Sullivan, Kenny Davern, Mike Stern, Patricia Barber, Tim Hagans, Niels Lan Doky, Joe Daley, Makanda Ken McIntyre, Charlie Haden, Tierney Sutton, Joshua Breakstone, Marcus Belgrave, Charles Gayle, Sheila Jordan and Ramsey Lewis.

He hosted his own radio show, Paul Wertico's Wild World of Jazz, from 2010 to 2012. As Musical Director for the crowdsourced TV video series, Inventing the Future, Wertico was nominated for a 2012–2013 Emmy Award in the “Outstanding Achievement In Interactivity” category by The National Academy of Television Arts & Sciences, Midwest Chapter.

He's the inventor of TUBZ, made by Pro-Mark, which also made the "Paul Wertico Signature Drum Stick".

In November 2024, Dream Cymbals released two Paul Wertico signature flat ride cymbals, the 20” & 22” Bliss WERTICO RIDE.

=== Teaching ===
Wertico is very active in the field of education. In addition to teaching drums privately for 55 years, he is an Associate Professor of Jazz Studies at the Chicago College of Performing Arts of Roosevelt University in Chicago, and he also headed the school’s Jazz & Contemporary Music Studies program for five years. He served on the faculty of the percussion and jazz-studies programs at the Bienen School of Music at Northwestern University in Evanston, Illinois for 16 years, and taught at the Bloom School of Jazz in Chicago for several years.

He has written educational articles for Modern Drummer, DRUM!, Drums & Drumming, Drum Tracks, and DownBeat, and for Musician.com. He serves on the advisory board of Modern Drummer, and is also one of their Pro-Panelists.

Wertico served five terms on the Board of Governors of The Recording Academy Chicago Chapter the National Academy of Recording Arts and Sciences (NARAS), as well as serving on both the Advisory Board and the Education Committee of The Jazz Institute of Chicago.

Wertico has performed numerous drum clinics and master classes at universities, high schools, and music stores in the U.S. and around the world, including Drummers Collective in NYC, Percussion Institute of Technology in LA, North Texas State University, and the University of Miami, as well as Musicians Institute in England, Drummers Institute in Germany, Escuela de Música Creativa in Spain, Università della Musica in Italy, Escuela de Música de Buenos Aires in Argentina, and the Rimon School of Jazz in Israel.

He has been a featured clinician/soloist at numerous international drum festivals including Canada’s Cape Breton International Drum Festival and the Montréal Drum Fest, Uruguay’s Montevideo Drum Festival, the CrossDrumming International Festival of Percussive Arts in Poland, the Mendoza International Drum Festival in Argentina, the Percussion Camp International Percussion Festival in Greece, and the First International Drummers Week in Venezuela, as well as at schools and festivals in New Zealand, Chile, Mexico, Russia, Hungary, France, Italy, Sweden, Ireland, and Spain.

He also performed at the 1994, 1999, 2002 & 2018 Percussive Arts Society International Conventions, the 1997 Modern Drummer Drum Festival (and appeared in videos of two of those events), and the 2005, 2013, 2014, 2019 & 2023 Chicago Drum Shows. Wertico is featured in the Drum Workshop videos, The American Dream II, The American Dream III and Masters of Resonance.

He has released two instructional videos: Fine Tuning Your Performance and Paul Wertico's Drum Philosophy — the latter (available on DVD), was named “One of the best drum videos of the last 25 years” by Modern Drummer magazine.

Wertico’s drum instructional book TURN THE BEAT AROUND (A Drummer’s Guide to Playing “Backbeats” on 1 & 3) was published by Alfred Music on July 7, 2017.

=== Recordings ===
Wertico has also released numerous recordings as co-leader: a self-titled LP, Earwax Control, and a live Earwax Control CD entitled, Number 2 Live; a self-titled LP, Spontaneous Composition; a drum/percussion duo CD (with Gregg Bendian) entitled BANG!; a double-guitar/double-drum three-CD set (with Derek Bailey, Pat Metheny and Bendian) entitled The Sign Of 4; and two piano/bass/drums trio CDs (with Laurence Hobgood and Brian Torff) entitled Union and State of the Union.

Some of his latest releases include a DVD & CD by David Cain & Paul Wertico entitled Feast for the Senses; a CD by Paul Wertico & Frank Catalano entitled Topics of Conversation; a CD by Fabrizio Mocata, Gianmarco Scaglia & Paul Wertico entitled Free the Opera!; a DVD & CD by Wertico Cain & Gray entitled Sound Portraits (winner of "Best Live Performance Album" in the 13th Annual Independent Music Awards (2014); Wertico Cain & Gray’s second CD entitled Out in SPACE; Wertico Cain & Gray's second DVD & third CD entitled Organic Architecture; Wertico Cain & Gray's fourth CD & video release entitled Realization (nominated for "Best Live Performance Album" and "Best Long Form Video" in the 15th Annual Independent Music Awards (2016); Wertico Cain & Gray's fifth CD entitled Short Cuts – 40 Improvisations; Wertico Cain & Gray's sixth CD entitled AfterLive; Wertico Cain & Gray's seventh CD & downloadable video release entitled Without Compromise; and Wertico Cain & Gray's eighth CD entitled Windows Of Time; a CD entitled Dynamics in Meditation by the Gianmarco Scaglia & Paul Wertico Quartet; The Paul Wertico/John Helliwell Project has two releases: a CD entitled The Bari Sessions and a 2-CD set entitled Live Under Italian Skies; and the Chicago-based Paul Wertico Trio (featuring guitarist John Moulder & bassist Eric Hochberg) released a CD (celebrating the trio’s 25th anniversary) entitled First Date, and the Italy-based Paul Wertico Trio (featuring pianist Fabrizio Mocata & bassist Gianmarco Scaglia) also released a CD entitled Letter from Rome. Paul’s latest four albums are entitled Paul Wertico’s Drums Without Boundaries (one of DownBeat magazine's Best Albums of 2023); Tuxedo Man by David Becker & Paul Wertico; and Interchange One and Interchange Two by Kevin Kastning & Paul Wertico

=== Influences ===
Wertico has cited Art Blakey, Elvin Jones, and Roy Haynes as continual influences on his musical work.

== Awards and honors ==
- Seven Grammy Awards with the Pat Metheny Group
- Chicagoan of the Year, Chicago Tribune, 2004
- Fusion Drummer of the Year, DRUM! magazine readers' poll, 1997
- Lifetime Achievement Award, Cape Breton International Drum Festival, 2010
- Lifetime Achievement Award, Montréal Drum Fest, 2010
- Chicago / Midwest Emmy Awards nomination, Outstanding Achievement in Interactivity, Inventing the Future, 2012–2013
- Best Live Performance Album, Sound Portraits, AIM Independent Music Awards, 2014
- Independent Music Awards nominations, Best Live Performance Album and Best Long Form Video, Realization, 2016

== Discography ==
=== As leader ===
Paul Wertico (featuring Bob Mintzer, Dave Liebman, David Mann, Howard Levy, Yu Gno Who (Pat Metheny), Brian Keane, Richie Beirach, Michael Bearden, Nik John Bariluk, Barbara Unger-Wertico, Dave Holland, Victor Bailey, Mino Cinelu, Paul Wertico & Malinke People of Mali)

- The Yin and the Yout (Intuition, 1993)

Paul Wertico Trio (featuring John Moulder, Eric Hochberg & Paul Wertico)

- Live in Warsaw! (Igmod, 1998)
- Don't Be Scared Anymore (Premonition, 2000)
- First Date (GAD, 2019)

WERTICO (featuring John Moulder, Brian Peters, Eric Hochberg, Barbara Wertico & Paul Wertico)

- StereoNucleosis (A440 Music, 2004)

Paul Wertico Trio (featuring John Moulder, Brian Peters & Paul Wertico)

- Another Side (Naim, 2006)

Paul Wertico Trio (featuring John Moulder, Larry Gray & Paul Wertico)

- "Cowboys & Africans" - A Chicago Jazz Tour ("Big Chicago" Records, Inc., 2006)

Paul Wertico’s Mid-East/Mid-West Alliance (Danny Markovitch, Dani Rabin, John Moulder, Brian Peters & Paul Wertico)

- Impressions of a City (Chicago Sessions, 2009)

Paul Wertico Trio (featuring Fabrizio Mocata, Gianmarco Scaglia & Paul Wertico)

- Letter from Rome (AlfaMusic, 2022)

Paul Wertico (featuring Mirko Pedrotti, Alex Munk, Gianmarco Scaglia, Paul Wertico & Ichos Percussion)

- Paul Wertico's Drums Without Boundaries (Da Vinci Classics, 2023)

=== As co-leader ===
With Spontaneous Composition (Rich Corpolongo, Doug Lofstrom & Paul Wertico)

- Spontaneous Composition (Spoco, 1981)

With Earwax Control (Gordon James, Jeff Czech & Paul Wertico)

- Earwax Control (Depot, 1984)
- 2 LIVE (Naim, 1994)
- "Mein Herr Ball" - Pro-Mark Collector's Edition Vol II (Pro-Mark Corporation, 1998)

With Trio New (Laurence Hobgood, Eric Hochberg & Paul Wertico

- New Bolero (Trio New Prod., 1993)

With Paul Wertico & Gregg Bendian

- BANG! (Truemedia Jazzworks, 1996)

With Derek Bailey, Pat Metheny, Gregg Bendian & Paul Wertico

- The Sign Of 4 (Knitting Factory, 1997)

With Union (Laurence Hobgood, Brian Torff & Paul Wertico)

- Union (Naim, 1997)
- State Of The Union (Naim, 1999)

With Brian Peters & Paul Wertico

- Ampersand (Rat Howl, 2007)

With Silvano Monasterios, Mark Egan & Paul Wertico

- Jazz Impressions 1 (Dogleg Music, 2007)

With David Cain & Paul Wertico

- Feast For The Senses (UMEDIA, 2012)

With Paul Wertico & Frank Catalano

- Topics Of Conversation (Blue Sky Fable, 2013)

With Fabrizio Mocata, Gianmarco Scaglia & Paul Wertico

- Free The Opera! (RAM, 2013)

With Wertico Cain & Gray (Paul Wertico, David Cain & Larry Gray)

- Sound Portraits (UMEDIA, 2013)
- Out In SPACE (UMEDIA, 2013)
- Organic Architecture (UMEDIA, 2014)
- Realization (UMEDIA Studios, 2015)
- Short Cuts – 40 Improvisations (UMEDIA, 2016)
- AfterLive (UMEDIA, 2017)
- Without Compromise (UMEDIA, 2019)
- Windows Of Time (UMEDIA, 2021)

With Gianmarco Scaglia & Paul Wertico Quartet

- Dynamics In Meditation (Challenge, 2020)

With Paul Wertico / John Helliwell Project

- Live Under Italian Skies (RAM, 2020)
- The Bari Session (Challenge, 2021)

With Marbin (Danny Markovitch, Dani Rabin & Paul Wertico)

- Marbinico (Marbin Music LLC, 2024)

With David Becker & Paul Wertico

- Tuxedo Man (New Sun, 2025)

With Kevin Kastning & Paul Wertico

- Interchange One (Greydisc, 2026)
- Interchange Two (Greydisc, 2026)

=== As member ===
With Pat Metheny Group

- First Circle (ECM, 1984)
- The Falcon and the Snowman (EMI, 1985)
- Still Life (Talking) (Geffen, 1987)
- Letter from Home (Geffen, 1989)
- The Road to You (Geffen, 1993)
- We Live Here (Geffen, 1995)
- Quartet (Geffen, 1996)
- Imaginary Day (Warner Bros., 1997)

With SBB

- Good bye! (Moskito, 2001)
- The Golden Harp (SBB, 2001)
- TRIO Live Tournee 2001 (Silesia, 2002)
- Nastroje (Jazz'n'Java, 2002)
- Anthology 1974–2004 (Metal Mind Productions, 2004)
- ODLOT Live 2004 (Silesia, 2005)
- New Century (Metal Mind Productions, 2005)
- Live In Theatre 2005 (Metal Mind Productions, 2005)
- Tryptyk Bydgoski – czesc III: Live In Kuznia (Art-Musa, 2017)
- Live Cuts: Ostrava 2002 (GAD, 2022)

With Simon & Bard Group

- Musaic (Flying Fish, 1980)
- Tear It Up (Flying Fish, 1982)
- The Enormous Radio (Flying Fish, 1984)

=== As sideman ===
With Larry Coryell

- The Power Trio: Live In Chicago (HighNote, 2003)
- Tricycles (In+Out, 2004)
- Larry Coryell Organ Trio - Impressions: The New York Sessions (Chesky, 2008)
- Prime Picks: The Virtuoso Guitar Of Larry Coryell (HighNote, 2010)
- Aurora Coryellis (Purple Pyramid, 2015)
- Tricycles (Remastered Deluxe Edition) (In+Out, 2021)

With Kurt Elling

- Close Your Eyes (Blue Note, 1995)
- "Tanganyika Dance" - Bob Belden's Shades of Blue (Blue Note, 1996)
- The Messenger (Blue Note, 1997)
- This Time It's Love (Blue Note, 1998)
- Man in the Air (Blue Note, 2003)

With Ken Nordine

- Triple Talk (Snail, 1984)
- Grandson Of Word Jazz (Snail, 1986)
- Ear Package (Snail, 1990)
- Upper Limbo (Grateful Dead, 1993)
- Transparent Mask (Asphodel, 2001)
- Bits & Pieces Of Word Jazz (From The Quirky Frontal Lobes Of Ken Nordine) (Snail, 2014)

With Terry Callier

- "I Don't Want to See Myself (Without You)" / "If I Could Make You (Change Your Mind)" (Erect, 1982; reissued on Acid Jazz, 1990 & 2006)
- TimePeace (Verve Forecast, 1998)
- Lifetime (Blue Thumb, 1999)
- "Silent Night" (Talkin' Loud, 1999)
- Life Lessons - The Best of Terry Callier (Demon Music Group Ltd., 2006)

With John Moulder

- Awakening (Mo-Tonal, 1993)
- Through The Open Door (Mo-Tonal, 1997)
- Trinity (Origin, 2006)
- Bifröst (Origin, 2009)
- John Moulder Quintet - The Eleventh Hour: Live At The Green Mill (Origin, 2012)
- Earthborn Tales Of Soul And Spirit (Origin, 2016)
- Decade: Memoirs (Origin, 2018)
- Metamorphosis (Origin, 2021)

With Howard Levy

- Harmonica Jazz (From The Vaults Vol. I) (Balkan Samba, 2018)
- The NBV Quintet (From The Vaults Vol. II) (Balkan Samba, 2019)
- Howard Levy / Johnny Frigo - Congroovance (Balkan Samba, 2024)

With Marbin

- Breaking the Cycle (MoonJune, 2011)
- Last Chapter of Dreaming (MoonJune, 2013)
- Marbinico (Marbin Music LLC, 2024)

With Scott Earl Holman

- Faith & Works (Crumblehead, 2008)
- Ode (Crumblehead, 2012)
- He Will Be Immanuel (Crumblehead, 2014)
- Easter (Crumblehead, 2018)

With Vangelis Katsoulis

- Silent Voyage (Libra, 2001)
- An Unbearably Short Glance (Libra, 2005)
- The Exile of Dreams (Blue Note, 2008)

With Niels Lan Doky

- Asian Sessions (Emarcy/Universal, 1999)
- Haitek Haiku (Emarcy/Universal, 2001)
- New Visions For A New World (Inner Adventures, 2025)

With Apostolis Anthimos

- Days We Can't Forget (Gowi, 1993)
- Back To The North (Metal Mind Productions, 2005)

With Bobby Lewis

- Inside This Song (Southport, 1993)
- Passion Flower (Southport, 1994)
- Here I Go Again (Southport, 1995)
- Flugel Gourmet (Southport, 1997)
- Just Havin' Some Fun (Southport, 1999)

With Paul Winter

- Earth: Voices of a Planet (Living Music, 1990)
- Anthems (Living Music, 1992)
- Paul Winter Consort - Earth Music (Living Music, 2011)

=== With others ===
With Francesco Fagiani

- My Age (AlfaMusic, 2026)

With Marlene Rosenberg Quartet (featuring Paul Wertico, Mark Feldman & Jake Shapiro)

- Dialogue (DistroKid, 2026)

With Julio Awad (featuring Mike Stern, Mark Egan & Paul Wertico)

- "Urban Tribal Dance" (Spotify & Apple Music, 2026)

With Eric Hochberg

- Eric Hochberg's Reunion Band (Bandcamp, 2025)

With Kol B’Seder

- We Are Partners (Transcontinental Music Publications, 2024)

With Fareed Haque

- Casseus! (Wahdude, 2023)

With Alina Skrzek

- Marzenia (Viator Records, 2022)

With Roman Miroshnichenko

- The Sixth Sense (RM, 2020)

With Barbara Wertico

- "Love Can Conquer Hate" (various streaming services, 2020)

With Paloma San Basilio

- Más Cerca (Warner Spain, 2019)

With Fabrizio Mocata

- Swango (Acqua, 2019)

With Andrea Miller

- Maybe Today (Present Tense, 2017)

With Fabio Armiliato

- Recital CanTango (Alfa, 2017)

With Isabelle Olivier

- Don't Worry, Be HaRpy (Enja, 2015)

With Mario Parmisano

- Forever Astor (Parmi, 2014)

With Bob Mamet

- London House Blues (Blujazz, 2014)

With Carrie McDowell

- Talk About The Girl (cSharp, 2013)

With Willa Moore

- Griffith Park (Land O'Fools, 2013)

With Lisa McClowry

- Do You Hear What I Hear (World Stage International, 2011)

With Steve Behr And The Behrkats

- History Of Jazz Piano (BK, 2011)

With Frank Quintero

- Guerreros De Luz (Switch Enterprises, 2011)

With Patxi Pascual

- After Dark (A.B.T., 2011)

With Dimension

- 23 (Zain, 2010)

With Liam O'Connor

- Tico Mystico (LOC, 2010)

With Alberto Mizrahi

- My World (Craig N' Co., 2009)

With Julio Awad

- Thousand Miles (SGAE Global Jazz, 2008)

With Jim Trompeter

- Wakefulness (JT, 2008)

With Matt Geraghty Project

- Passport (MGP, 2007)

With Piotr Wojtasik

- Circle (SOJazz, 2007)

With Ronit Ben-Arie

- More Hebrew In Song (RBA, 2007)

With Synergy

- Later (NeXtep, 2006)

With Jill Jensen & Jack Grassel

- It's About The Music (Frozen Sky, 2006)

With Mike Phillips

- Uncommon Denominator (Hidden Beach, 2005)

With Walt Cunningham Jr.

- Faithful Over a Few Things (WCJ, 2005)

With Insout

- Acoustic Privacy (TRP, 2005)

With Frontera Cero

- Nada Que Declarar (La Flamenca, 2005)

With Anthony Plessas

- Tales of The Water (MusicLtd, 2005)

With Lefteris Christofis

- Nous Icons (Blue Note, 2005)

With The Beth Emet Youth Choir 2004-2005

- The Magical Makeilah (TMM, 2005)

With Tom Mac

- Upper Palette (Mac Group Productions, 2003)

With Allegra Rosenberg & Talia Wertico

- Songs For The Swing Set (RAW, 2003)

With Fred Simon

- "That Fall" - Windham Hill Chill 2 (Windham Hill, 2003)

With Barbara Sfraga

- Under The Moon (A440 Group, 2003)

With Kindred The Family Soul

- Surrender to Love (Hidden Beach, 2003)

With David Bowie

- "This Is Not America" - Best of Bowie (EMI, 2002)

With Frank Kvinge

- Gaucho Batuta (Batuta, 2002)

With Frank Catalano

- Live At The Green Mill (Delmark, 2001)

With Gillespi

- SuperChatarraEsp̩éshal (Ultradeforme, 2001)

With John Williams

- Steam (Green Linnet, 2001)

With Rob Ryndak

- Stay With It (Southport, 2001)

With Shakshuka

- Ad Halom (Shakshuka, 2001)

With Hanako Takami

- On The First (East West Japan, 2001)

With Tom Gullion

- Cat's Cradle (Naim Audio, 1999)

With Cheryl&Co.

- Cookie Time. (JTM Media, 1999)

With Willy Schwarz

- Live For The Moment (Clearspot/EFA, 1999)

With Jackie Allen

- "Deserted Caravan" - Women Who Swing—Chicago ("Big Chicago" Records, Inc., 1998)

With Pat Belliveau

- La Zona Blanca (Pabco, 1997)

With Eddie Marshall

- Cookin' For You (Song-o-sau'rus, 1996)

With The Rich Corpolongo Quartet Plus Two

- Just Found Joy (Delmark, 1996)

With Frank Gregory

- Inner Drive (Valley Vue, 1995)

With The Chicago Hitmen

- Ultimate Christmas (Kimber K, 1995)

With Watermelon Sugar

- Watermelon Sugar (Tin Mad Dog, 1993)

With Pat Metheny

- Secret Story (Geffen, 1992)

With Paul Halley

- Angel On A Stone Wall (Living Music, 1991)

With Don Bennett

- Sleeping Giant (Southport, 1990)

With Eugene Friesen

- Arms Around You (Living Music, 1989)

With Fred Simon

- Usually/Always (Windham Hill, 1988)

With Brad Goode

- Shock of the New (Delmark, 1988)

With Andrew Calhoun

- Walk Me To The War (Flying Fish, 1986)

With Miss Jackie Weissman

- Sniggles, Squirrels, And Chicken Pox: Volume One (Miss Jackie Music Co., 1986)

With Jerry Goodman

- On the Future of Aviation (Private Music, 1985)

With Guy Fricano

- Jazz Inside Out (Forever Jazz, 1984)

With Dave Gordon

- Green Things (Sparrow Sound Design, 1984)

With Andre Caporaso

- Collage (Blue Room, 1984)

With Fred Koch

- Children's Record (Red Rover, 1983)

With Rich Fudoli

- Getting Hooked On (Phonograph, 1982)

With David Cloud & Jeffrey Thomas

- The Jazz Dance Workout Giordano Technique (Orion, 1982)

With Peggy Pascal & Jill Hearn

- Music Is Magic (Sweet Punkin Productions, 1982)

With Ellen McIlwaine

- Everybody Needs It (Blind Pig, 1982)

With Mike Smith

- Luminescence (Shmo, 1981)

With Amy Levin

- "Sunglasses" / "Good To You" (July Records, 1981)

With Paul Berliner and KUDU

- The Sun Rises Late Here (Flying Fish, 1979)
