= Kurt Elling =

American jazz singer and songwriter (born 1967)

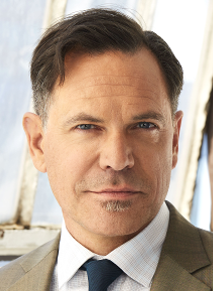
- Elling in 2016

Background information
- Born: November 2, 1967 (age 59); Chicago, Illinois, U.S.
- Genre: Jazz
- Occupations: Singer, composer
- Years active: 1995–present
- Labels: Blue Note, Naim, Concord Jazz, Cuneiform, Okeh, Edition, Big Shoulders
- Website: kurtelling.com

Kurt Elling (born November 2, 1967) is an American jazz singer and songwriter.

Born in Chicago, Illinois, and raised in Rockford, Elling became interested in music through his father, who was Kapellmeister at a Lutheran church. He sang in choirs and played musical instruments. He encountered jazz while a student at Gustavus Adolphus College in Minnesota. After college, he enrolled in the University of Chicago Divinity School, but he left one credit short of a degree to pursue a career as a jazz vocalist.

Elling began to perform around Chicago, scat singing and improvising his lyrics. He recorded a demo in the early 1990s and was signed by Blue Note. He has been nominated for seventeen Grammy Awards, winning Best Vocal Jazz Album for Dedicated to You (2009) and Secrets Are the Best Stories (2021). Elling often leads the Down Beat magazine Critics' Poll. He had a longtime collaboration with pianist Laurence Hobgood, leading a quartet that toured throughout the world.

== Early life ==
Elling was born in Chicago, Illinois on November 2, 1967, the son of Henry and Martha Elling. His interest in music started with his father, who was Kapellmeister at a Lutheran church. Elling attended elementary school at St. Paul Lutheran School in Rockford, and throughout his early years, he sang in choirs and played violin, French horn, piano, and drums. During his middle school years, Elling remembers watching Tony Bennett and the Woody Herman band on television and imagining what it would be like to sing with a band. Growing up, Elling sang in the classical style, learning counterpoint from the motets of Johann Sebastian Bach.

At Rockford Lutheran High School, in Rockford, Illinois, Elling continued to sing in the choir: "When it was undeniably uncool and geeky and all that, to be in the choir, I did it anyway, because it was reliably beautiful, and it was rewarding, and it gave me gifts of experience and friendships." One of these experiences was that of singing the National Anthem with the high school madrigal choir, "Joyful Sounds" under the direction of Joyce Kortze in front of his first large crowd of over 40,000 people.

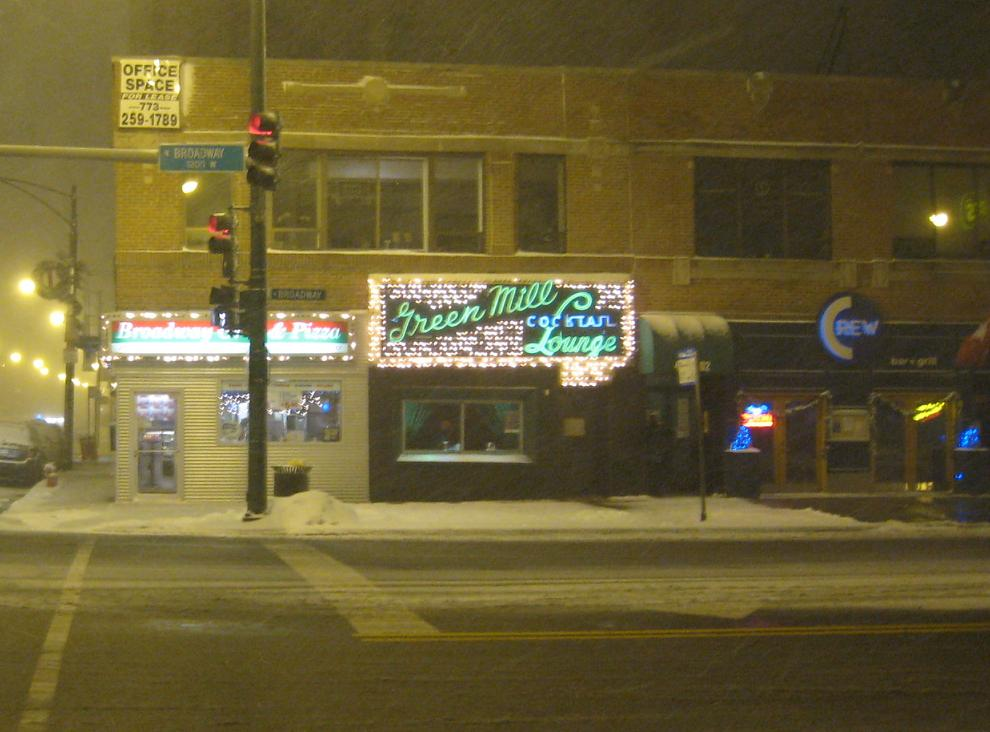
Elling became known in Chicago from his weekly gigs at the Green Mill Jazz Club, where he met pianist Laurence Hobgood through saxophonist Ed Petersen.

Elling attended Gustavus Adolphus College in St. Peter, Minnesota, where he majored in history and minored in religion. In college, Elling sang in the 70-voice Gustavus Choir, an a cappella choir that performed works from a variety of different composers, allowing him to hone his technical skills. Elling also toured Europe with his college choir. He became interested in jazz at Gustavus Adolphus while listening to Dave Brubeck, Dexter Gordon, Herbie Hancock, and Ella Fitzgerald.

After graduating from Gustavus Adolphus in 1989, Elling enrolled in graduate school at the University of Chicago Divinity School where he studied for his master's degree in philosophy of religion. He thought about continuing work in academia or working for the World Council of Churches when he graduated. He began playing jazz gigs once a week during graduate school, with one of his first shows at Milt Trenier's, a basement club in Chicago (now defunct). He earned little money at these gigs, but Karl Johnson, the house pianist, was his mentor and teacher. Elling recalls, "By day I was reading Kant and Schleiermacher, trying to get a handle on that, and at night I was sitting-in in clubs, and, of course, you can't do both and be effective. Eventually Saturday night won out over Sunday morning." He remained a graduate student until January 1992, when he left school one credit short of graduation.

In Chicago, Elling worked as a bartender and as a mover. He sang at weddings in addition to clubs. At this time, he began singing in a scat style and improvising his own lyrics. Elling began listening to the vocalese of jazz singer Mark Murphy, who exposed him to the poetry of Jack Kerouac. The minimalism and emotion of Chet Baker's music was also influential.

== Career ==
While living in Chicago in 1995, Elling decided he was ready to record. He had met pianist Laurence Hobgood through Ed Petersen, who played at the Green Mill Jazz Club on Monday nights. Elling convinced Hobgood that he was ready to go into the studio, and they came out with nine solid songs. Following the advice of pianist Fred Simon, the cassette recording was sent to Bill Traut, a manager in Los Angeles, who eventually gave it to Bruce Lundvall of Blue Note.

In 1995, Elling signed with Blue Note, and the songs on the demo became the Grammy-nominated label debut, Close Your Eyes (1995). The album features Edward Petersen and Von Freeman on tenor saxophone, Dave Onderdonk on guitar, Laurence Hobgood on piano, Eric Hochberg and Rob Amster on double bass, and Paul Wertico on drums. On his second Blue Note album, ‘’The Messenger’’ (1997), Elling included a distinctive rendition of “Nature Boy,” the jazz standard written by eden ahbez and popularized by Nat King Cole. Arranged with pianist Laurence Hobgood, Elling’s version features his signature vocalese style, blending poetic lyricism with improvisational scat singing. The track, praised for its fresh interpretation, became a fan favorite and a staple in his live performances, including a notable 2008 performance with the Sydney Symphony Orchestra and a 2001 set at the Newport Jazz Festival.

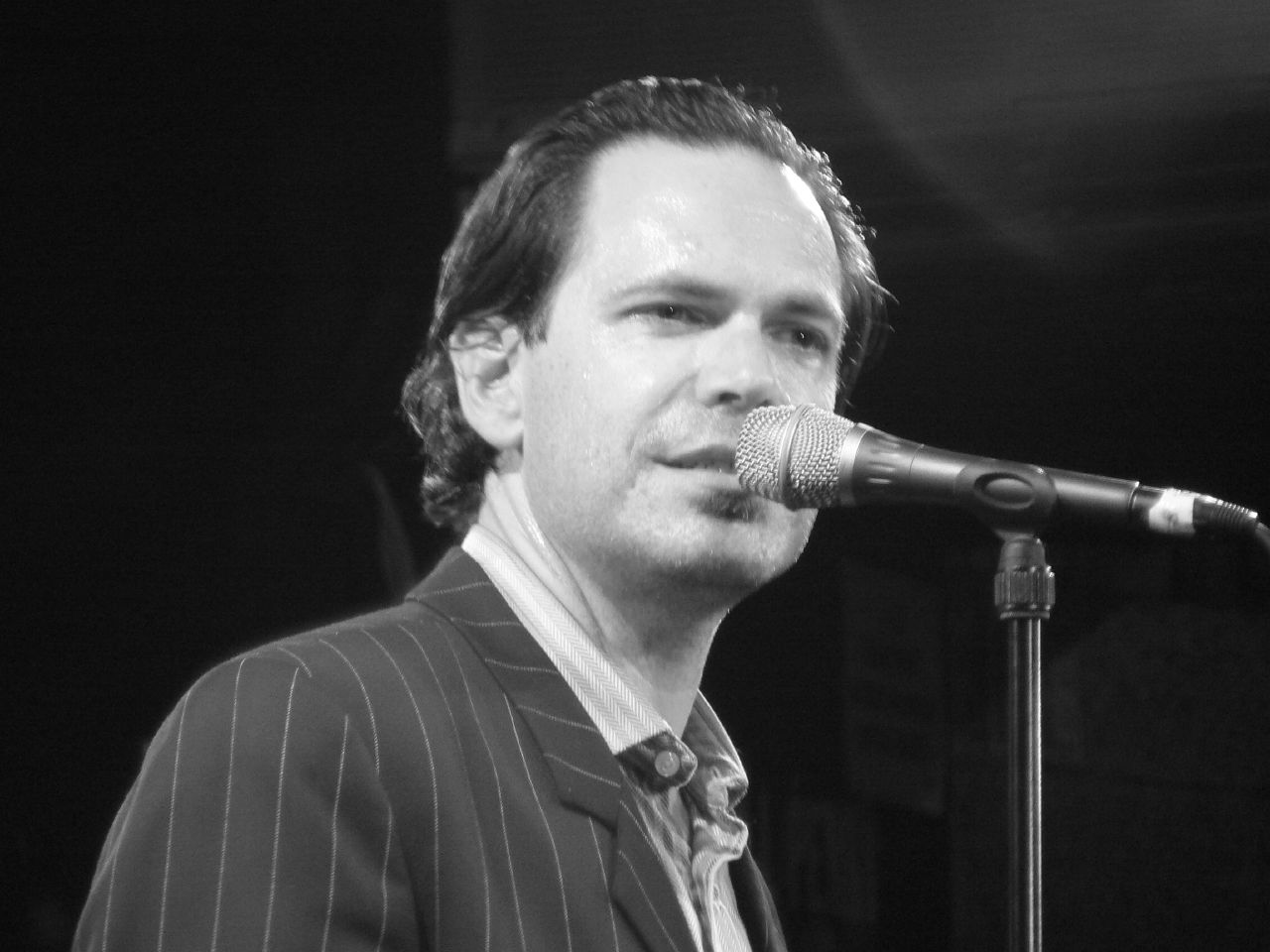
Elling performing in 2006

In 1999, Elling became a National Trustee for the National Academy of Recording Arts and Sciences, and in 2003 he was elected vice-chair and served two terms.

In 2006, Elling performed on the television program Legends of Jazz, in the episode "The Jazz Singers". Elling sang "She's Funny That Way" and performed a duet with Al Jarreau on "Take Five". The recording was released on CD and DVD. In August of the same year, Elling signed a contract with Concord Jazz, and his first album with the label, Nightmoves, was released in 2007.

The follow-up, Dedicated to You: Kurt Elling Sings the Music of Coltrane and Hartman (2009), is a tribute to the 1963 recording John Coltrane and Johnny Hartman, widely recognized as one of the all-time finest jazz vocal albums. The album arose out of a 2005 concert commissioned by the Chicago Jazz Festival, showcasing the Coltrane-Hartman material. Later, Elling and pianist Laurence Hobgood rearranged the music, culminating in a performance in the Allen Room at the Lincoln Center for the Performing Arts in New York. The concert was recorded in January 2009 and the album was released in June.

Elling is a baritone with a four-octave range, and a writer and performer of vocalese, writing and performing words over improvised jazz solos. In 2007, 2012 and 2020, Circumstantial Productions published three editions of Lyrics: Kurt Elling, collections of Elling's vocalese lyrics edited by Richard Connolly.

In September 2025, Elling made his Broadway debut as Hermes in Hadestown.

== Collaborators ==
Elling has performed and recorded with David Amram, Randy Bachman, Bob Belden, Joanne Brackeen, Oscar Brown Jr., Jodie Christian, Billy Corgan, Orbert Davis, George Freeman, Buddy Guy, Jon Hendricks, Charlie Hunter, Bob Mintzer, Brad Mehldau, Lee Ritenour, John Pizzarelli, and Bob Sheppard.

Until November 2013, Elling's band included musical director Laurence Hobgood on piano, John McLean on guitar, Clark Sommers on bass, and drummer Kendrick Scott. Howard Reich's wrote in his November 6, 2013 column "My kind of Jazz" in the Chicago Tribune, that Elling and Hobgood would be going separate ways. Hobgood linked to that article from his website. Elling's website announced the change on November 12, 2013.

The band included a rotating series of pianists until October 2015 when Gary Versace became Kurt Elling's first-call pianist and was added to the Band page on Elling's website. Then in August 2016, Stu Mindeman took over as piano chair and Versace's page was moved to Extended Family.

In 2016 he was a member of Branford Marsalis's quartet. He toured with the band and performed on the album Upward Spiral, which was nominated for a Grammy Award. Marsalis co-produced Elling's album The Questions and performed on three songs.

== Personal life ==
In 1996, Elling married dancer Jennifer Carney. Their daughter Luiza was born in 2005. In the same year, the Ellings purchased a condominium from Barack Obama in Hyde Park, Chicago. The Ellings moved to New York in 2008.

== Discography ==
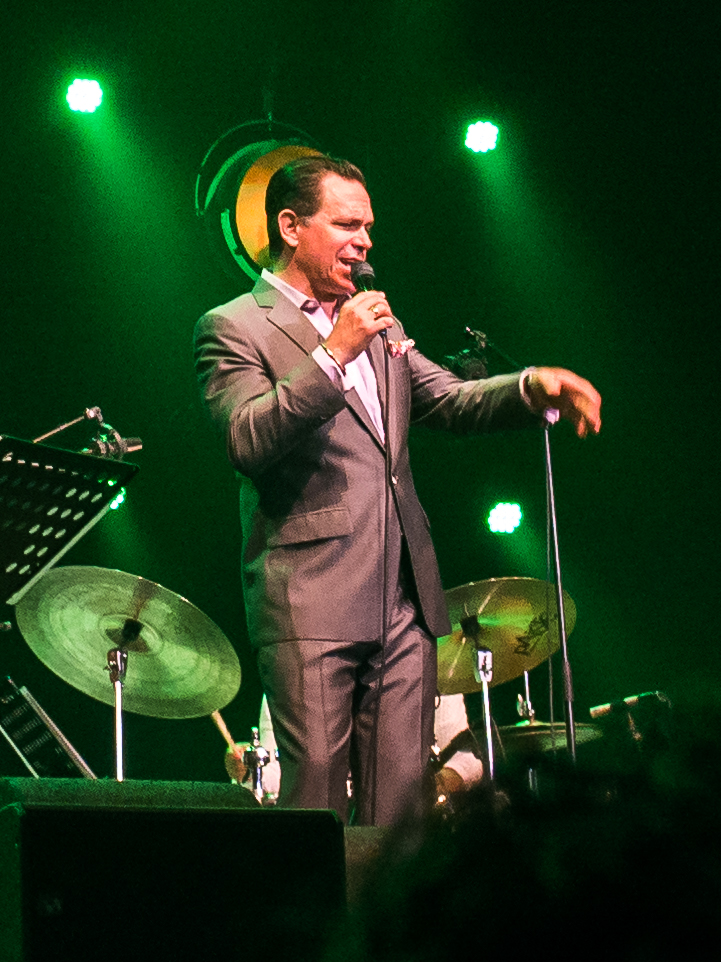
Elling at the North Sea Jazz Festival 2015

=== As leader ===
- Coming of Age (Self Adhesive Records, 1991)
- Close Your Eyes (Blue Note, 1995)
- The Messenger (Blue Note, 1997)
- This Time It's Love (Blue Note, 1998)
- Live in Chicago (Blue Note, 2000)
- Flirting with Twilight (Blue Note, 2001)
- Man in the Air (Blue Note, 2003)
- Nightmoves (Concord Jazz, 2007)
- Dedicated to You: Kurt Elling Sings the Music of Coltrane and Hartman (Concord, 2009)
- The Gate (Concord, 2011)
- 1619 Broadway – The Brill Building Project (Concord, 2012)
- Passion World (Concord, 2015)
- The Beautiful Day: Kurt Elling Sings Christmas (Okeh, 2016)
- The Questions (Okeh, 2018)
- Secrets Are the Best Stories (Edition, 2020)
- Wildflowers, Vol. 1 (with Sullivan Fortner) (Edition, 2024)
- Wildflowers, Vol. 2 (with Joey Calderazzo) (Edition, 2024)
- Wildflowers, Vol. 3 (with Christian Sands) (Big Shoulders, 2025)

With SuperBlue (with Charlie Hunter)

- SuperBlue (Edition, 2021)
- SuperBlue: The London Sessions (Live) [EP] (Edition, 2022)
- SuperBlue: The Iridescent Spree (Edition, 2023)
- SuperBlue: Guilty Pleasures [EP] (Edition, 2023)
- SuperBlue: Guilty Pleasures, Vol. 2 [EP] (Big Shoulders, 2024)

=== As guest ===
With Laurence Hobgood

- Left to My Own Devices... (Naim, 2000)
- Crazy World (Naim, 2005)
- When the Heart Dances (Naim, 2009)
- Christmas (Circumstantial Productions, 2013)

With Bob Mintzer

- Live at MCG (MCG Jazz, 2004)
- Old School: New Lessons (Telarc/MCG Jazz, 2006)
- Swing Out (Telarc/MCG Jazz, 2008)

With others

- Bob Belden, Shades of Blue (Blue Note, 1996)
- The Manhattan Transfer, Swing (Atlantic, 1997)
- Yellowjackets, Club Nocturne (1998)
- Joanne Brackeen, Pink Elephant Magic (Arkadia Jazz, 1999)
- Charlie Hunter, Songs from the Analog Playground (2001)
- George Freeman, At Long Last George (2001)
- Jackie Allen, The Men in My Life (2003)
- Jon Weber, Simple Complex (2004)
- Fred Hersch, Leaves of Grass (2005)
- Till Brönner, Rio (2008)
- John Pizzarelli, Rockin' in Rhythm: A Tribute to Duke Ellington (2010)
- The Claudia Quintet, What Is the Beautiful? (Cuneiform, 2011)
- Lee Ritenour, Rhythm Sessions (Concord, 2012)
- Kate McGarry, Girl Talk (2012)
- Aki Yashiro, Live in New York (2013)
- Renee Fleming, Christmas in New York (2014)
- Harold Mabern, Afro Blue (Smoke Sessions, 2015)
- Branford Marsalis, Upward Spiral (Marsalis Music/Okeh, 2016)
- Brad Mehldau, Finding Gabriel (Nonesuch, 2019)
- WDR Big Band, In the Brass Palace (Big Shoulders, 2025)

== Awards and nominations ==
Elling has won the Down Beat Critics Poll thirteen times, from 2000–2012, and the Down Beat Readers Poll seven times and the JazzTimes Readers' Poll eight times, all in the Male Vocalist of the Year category. He has also received the Jazz Journalists Association Male Singer of the Year award eight times. In 2010 he was awarded the Edison/Jazz World award for The Gate. The Edison is the Dutch equivalent of a Grammy. In 2012 he was honored as the first Jazz Ambassador at the Silesian Jazz Festival in Poland, and he also won the German Echo Jazz award and the Scottish Jazz Award – International category. In 2013 he was named International Jazz Artist of the Year in the Jazz FM Awards (UK).

=== Grammy Awards ===
The Grammy Awards are awarded annually by the National Academy of Recording Arts and Sciences of the United States. On January 31, 2010, Elling won his first Grammy Award in the category of Best Jazz Vocal Album for the album Dedicated to You: Kurt Elling Sings the Music of Coltrane and Hartman on the Concord Jazz label.

Year	Nominee / work	Award	Result
1995	Close Your Eyes	Best Jazz Vocal Performance	Nominated
1997	The Messenger	Best Jazz Vocal Performance	Nominated
1998	This Time it's Love	Best Jazz Vocal Performance	Nominated
2000	Live in Chicago	Best Jazz Vocal Album	Nominated
2001	Flirting with Twilight	Best Jazz Vocal Album	Nominated
2001	"Easy Living"	Best Instrumental Arrangement Accompanying a Vocalist	Nominated
2003	Man in the Air	Best Jazz Vocal Album	Nominated
2007	Nightmoves	Best Jazz Vocal Album	Nominated
2009	Dedicated to You	Best Jazz Vocal Album	Won
2012	The Gate	Best Jazz Vocal Album	Nominated
2013	1619 Broadway – The Brill Building Project	Best Jazz Vocal Album	Nominated
2016	Upward Spiral	Best Jazz Vocal Album	Nominated
2021	Secrets are the Best Stories (featuring Danilo Pérez)	Best Jazz Vocal Album	Won
2022	SuperBlue	Best Jazz Vocal Album	Nominated
2024	SuperBlue: The Iridescent Spree	Best Alternative Jazz Album	Nominated
2025	Wildflowers, Vol.1	Best Jazz Vocal Album	Nominated

== Publications ==
- Elling, Kurt (November 1997). "Guerrilla Diaries". Jazziz Magazine. Archived from the original on March 29, 2010.
- Elling, Kurt (2007). Richard Connolly (ed.). Lyrics. Circumstantial Productions. ISBN 978-1-891592-06-5. Archived from the original on May 5, 2010.
