= Jazz Showcase =

Jazz club

Coordinates: 41°53′29″N 87°37′49″W

Jazz Showcase is one of the oldest jazz clubs in Chicago, Illinois, founded in 1947 by NEA Jazz Master Joe Segal, whose son Wayne now owns and operates the venue. Segal's various showcases have served as a launch pad for a number of career jazz musicians.

== Locations ==
Having changed location numerous times since its founding, the club last relocated in 2008 to a South Plymouth Court address on the side of the rebuilt Dearborn Station, in Chicago, Illinois. To honor Segal, South Plymouth Court was renamed Joe Segal Way by the City of Chicago at the behest of Alderman Bob Fioretti. One of its previous locations was in The Blackstone Hotel for 14 years from 1981 to 1995.

== Club owner ==
Joe Segal (April 24, 1926 – August 10, 2020) founded the Jazz Showcase in 1947 in Chicago, Illinois and was the club's owner until his death in 2020. Born April 24, 1926 in Philadelphia, he grew up listening to Louis Armstrong, Sidney Bechet and Fats Waller on the radio. When he was old enough, he would visit the Earl Theater to watch them perform.

The Air Force drafted Segal in 1944 and he was stationed in Champaign, Illinois for a while. When he had leave, he rode the train to Chicago to attend live jazz performances at clubs on Randolph Street. Following his military discharge, Segal moved to Chicago, enrolled in Roosevelt College on the G.I. Bill and worked at different jazz venues around the city. In 1947, he worked with his classmates, Gus Savage, who was chairman of the Social Activities Committee for Roosevelt, and Bennett Johnson to organize a weekly jam session. They presented jazz greats such Charlie Parker, Lester Young, Sonny Rollins and many others. For the next ten years he organized live jazz sessions on the school's campus featuring musicians he met working at various local jazz venues.

Beginning in 1957, Segal ran his showcase shows in what he later estimated was 63 different locations over the years. By the 1970s, Segal opened a formal club called the Jazz Showcase on Rush Street. He gave performers a five evening run with a Sunday show to encourage young people to attend.

In 2013, Segal received an honorary doctorate from his alma mater, Roosevelt University. In 2015, Segal was chosen by the National Endowment for the Arts as an NEA Jazz Master for jazz advocacy; he was the second club owner/presenter so chosen.

== Notable Performers ==
- Muhal Richard Abrams
- Eric Alexander
- Monty Alexander
- Mose Allison
- Ernestine Anderson
- The Art Ensemble of Chicago
- Kenny Barron
- Gary Bartz
- Count Basie
- George Benson
- Walter Bishop Jr.
- Art Blakey and the Jazz Messengers
- Joanne Brackeen
- Bobby Broom
- Kenny Burrell
- The Capp-Pierce Juggernaut
- James Carter
- Richie Cole
- George Coleman
- Ornette Coleman
- Ravi Coltrane
- Larry Coryell
- Hank Crawford
- Eddie "Lockjaw" Davis
- Joey DeFrancesco
- Lou Donaldson
- Kenny Drew Jr.
- Bill Evans
- Art Farmer
- Joe Farrell
- Tommy Flanagan
- Sonny Fortune
- Von Freeman
- Dizzy Gillespie
- Benny Golson
- Dexter Gordon
- Bunky Green
- Johnny Griffin
- Roy Hargrove
- Winard Harper
- Tom Harrell
- Barry Harris
- Eddie Harris
- Freddie Hubbard
- Bobby Hutcherson
- Milt Jackson
- Ahmad Jamal
- Eddie Jefferson
- Philly Joe Jones
- The Thad Jones/Mel Lewis Orchestra
- Barney Kessel
- Rahsaan Roland Kirk
- Yusef Lateef
- Bobby Lewis
- Joe Lovano
- Harold Mabern
- Pat Mallinger
- Marbin
- Pat Martino
- Jack McDuff
- Howard McGhee
- Jimmy McGriff
- Marian McPartland
- Charles McPherson
- Pat Metheny
- Frank Morgan
- Joe Pass
- Danilo Perez
- Willie Pickens
- Chris Potter
- Judy Roberts
- Sonny Rollins
- Zoot Sims/Al Cohn
- Jimmy Smith
- Lonnie Liston Smith
- Sonny Stitt
- Ira Sullivan
- Sun Ra
- Stanley Turrentine
- McCoy Tyner
- Cedar Walton
- Michael Weiss
- Paul Wertico
- Randy Weston
- Joe Williams

== Live recordings ==
Segal made recordings from the Showcase's soundboard of the live performances, with the musicians' consent. Because he often recorded multiple renditions of the same song over a performer's run at the venue, record producer Zev Feldman "thinks the Segal collection may be a strong contender for the most extensive live jazz archive of its kind in the world". Feldman curated four LP sets of live 1970s performances from the Jazz Showcase that were released on Record Store Day on April 18, 2026, with a CD and digital release of the same on April 24, 2026, marking what would have been Segal's 100th birthday. These include:

- Joe Henderson — Consonance: Live at the Jazz Showcase
- Ahmad Jamal — At The Jazz Showcase: Live in Chicago
- Yusef Lateef — Alight Upon The Lake: Live at the Jazz Showcase
- Mal Waldron — Stardust & Starlight: At The Jazz Showcase

Other live recordings released over the years include:

- Gene Ammons and Dexter Gordon, The Chase! (1970)
- Louie Bellson, Live at Joe Segal's Jazz Showcase (Concord Jazz, 1987)
- Ahmad Jamal, Chicago Revisited: Live at Joe Segal's Jazz Showcase (Telarc, 1992)
- Bob Lark/Phil Woods, Live at the Jazz Showcase (Jazzed Media, 2006)
- Marian McPartland and Willie Pickens, Ain't Misbehavin': Live at the Jazz Showcase (Concord Jazz, 2000)
- Danilo Pérez, Live at the Jazz Showcase (Artistshare, 2003)
- Ira Sullivan and Stu Katz, A Family Affair: Live at Joe Segal's Jazz Showcase (Origin, 2010)
- Phil Wilson and the Big Band Machine, Live at Joe Segal's Jazz Showcase (1984)

== See also ==
- List of jazz clubs
