= Jackie Allen =

Jackie Allen may refer to:

- Jackie Allen (American football) (born 1947), cornerback in American football
- Jackie Allen (musician) (born 1959), jazz vocalist and composer
