= Marbin =

US musical group

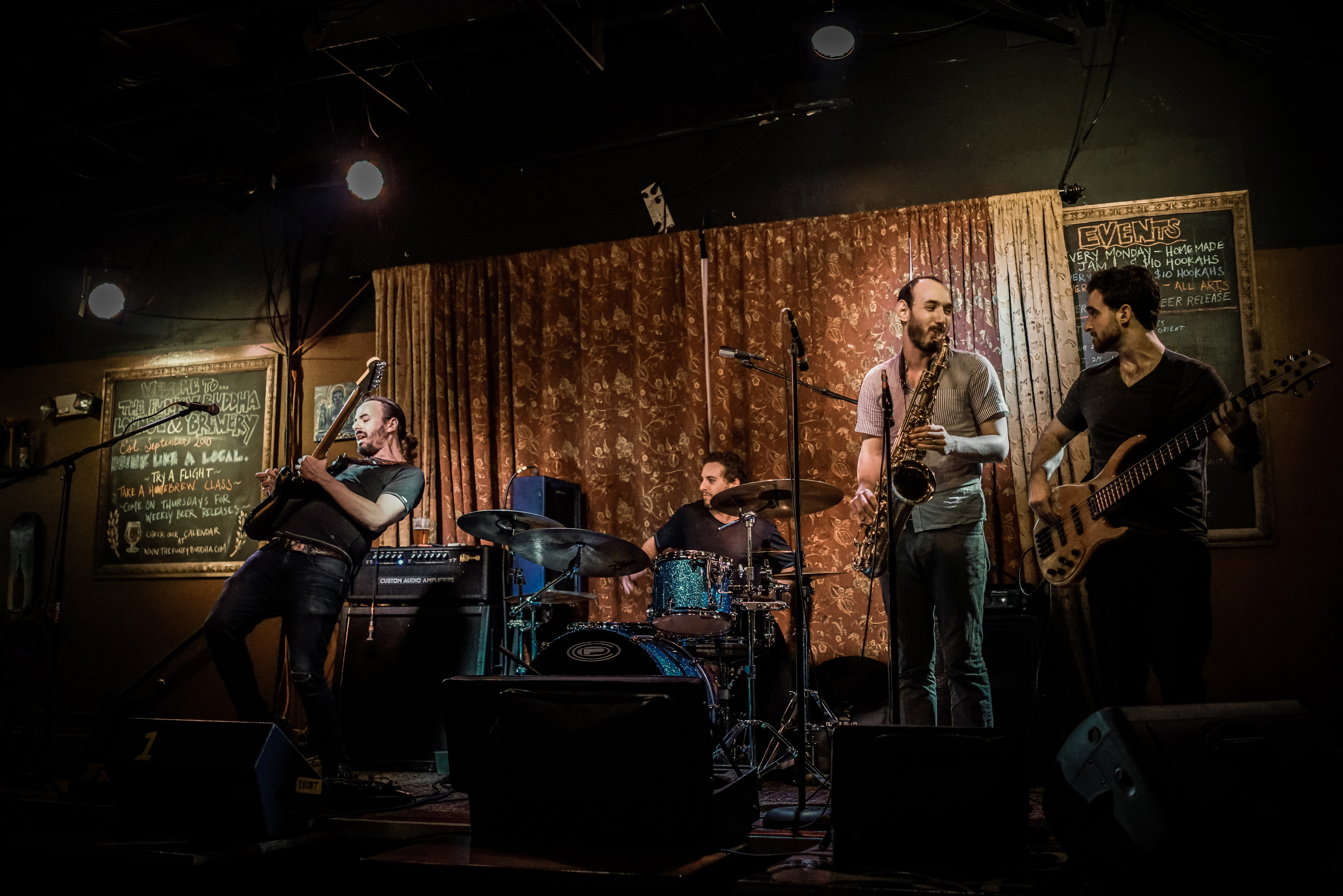
- Marbin on U.S. tour, 2016

Background information
- Origin: Israel
- Genres: Jazz rock, jazz fusion, progressive rock
- Years active: 2007–present
- Label: Independent
- Members: Danny Markovitch; Dani Rabin; Everette A. Benton Jr.; Jon Nadel
- Past members: Paul Wertico; Steve Rodby; Justyn Lawrence; Jae Gentile; Greg Essig; John Lauler; Blake Jiracek; Ian Stewart
- Website: www.marbinmusic.com

Marbin is a jazz rock band formed by Israeli musicians Danny Markovitch and Dani Rabin.

== History ==
Markovitch and Rabin met shortly after Markovitch completed his military service as an infantry sergeant and Rabin had graduated from Berklee College of Music in Boston.

In 2007, the pair founded Marbin in Israel. After moving to Chicago, they released their first album in 2009. They were asked to join a band led by Paul Wertico, a drummer from Chicago who had been a member of the Pat Metheny Group. Paul introduced Marbin to bassist Steve Rodby, who had also been a member of the Pat Metheny Group, and together they recorded Breaking the Cycle (Moonjune, 2011). Wertico and Rodby appeared as guests on Marbin's next album, Last Chapter of Dreaming (Moonjune, 2013), which was recorded by Markovitch, Rabin, Jae Gentile, and Justyn Lawrence. The same members released a live album, The Third Set (Moonjune, 2014), but the membership changed for Aggressive Hippies (Moonjune, 2014), with Markovitch and Rabin joined by Greg Essig and John Lauler. The band's current line up consists of bassist Jon Nadel and drummer Everette A. Benton, Jr. Marbin released two albums with its prior line up that included drummer Blake Jiracek: Goatman and the House of the Dead (2016) and Israeli Jazz (2018). A new album with the current lineup, Strong Thing, was released on December 1, 2019.

== Performing ==
In addition to their regular schedule playing in top venues and festivals in the U.S., (The Jazz Showcase, Frozen Dead Guy Days, Magic Bag, Gilly's, Andy's Jazz Club, Green Mill, Chicago Jazz Festival), in September 2011, Marbin toured with fusion super group Scott Henderson, Mike Clark, and Jeff Berlin on the east coast and the midwest. In March 2012, Marbin toured with Allan Holdsworth's trio that included Jimmy Haslip of the Yellowjackets and drummer Virgil Donati. In 2013 Marbin played with Wayne Krantz, Tim Lefebvre, and Nate Wood.

== Discography ==
- Marbin (self-released, 2009)
- Breaking the Cycle (Moonjune, 2011)
- Last Chapter of Dreaming (Moonjune, 2013)
- The Third Set (Moonjune, 2014)
- Aggressive Hippies (self-released, 2015)
- Goatman and the House of the Dead (self-released, 2016)
- Israeli Jazz (self-released, 2018)
- Strong Thing (self-released, December 1, 2019)
- Shreddin at Sweetwater (Live) (self-released, February 5, 2021)
- Fernweh (self-released, July 2, 2021)
- Dirty Horse (self-released, June 1, 2023)

== See also ==
- Music of Israel
