= PoemJazz =

PoemJazz is an album by poet, essayist, literary critic, translator and America's 39th Poet Laureate Consultant in Poetry to the Library of Congress Robert Pinsky, and Grammy-Award-winning pianist, composer, and arranger Laurence Hobgood.

Released by Circumstantial Productions in 2012, the album was produced by Richard Connolly and Laurence Hobgood.

PoemJazz treats a voice speaking poetry as having a role like that of a horn: speech with its own poetic melody and rhythm, in conversation with what the music is doing. The variations in pitch and cadence are those inherent in the words themselves, as they make their way through the lines: idiom true to itself while adapting its rhythms and pitches to counterparts in the music.

The melodic arcs and contours of the grammar, the patterns of the consonants and vowels—all these in the poetry are in conversation with the music: not sung, not acted, but spoken as verse, responding to the music. As in rap, the music in poemjazz is in conversation with speech rather than illustrating it or interpreting it or setting it.

Richard Connolly invented the word poemjazz during the production of the first PoemJazz album in November 2011.

PoemJazz II: House Hour was released in 2015.
