= The Questions (album) =

Studio album by Kurt Elling
- Released: March 23, 2018
- Recorded: October 5–12, 2017
- Studios: Sear Sound, New York City
- Genre: Jazz
- Label: Okeh Records
- Producers: Kurt Elling, Branford Marsalis

Kurt Elling chronology
The Beautiful Day: Kurt Elling Sings Christmas (2016)	The Questions (2018)	Secrets Are the Best Stories (2020)

The Questions is a studio album by American jazz singer Kurt Elling that was released by Okeh.

== Track listing ==
1. "A Hard Rain's a-Gonna Fall" (Bob Dylan, arrangement: Stu Mindeman, Kurt Elling) - 8:12
2. "A Happy Thought" (Mindeman, Franz Wright) - 3:46
3. "American Tune" (Paul Simon, arr.: Christian Elsässer, adaptation: Mindeman) - 6:12
4. "Washing of the Water" (Peter Gabriel) - 4:12
5. "A Secret in Three Views" (Jaco Pastorius, Elling, Phil Galdston, Rumi) - 6:18
6. "Lonely Town" (Leonard Bernstein, Betty Comden, Adolph Green) - 6:54
7. "Endless Lawns" (Carla Bley, Kurt Elling, Sara Teasdale) - 9:04
8. "I Have Dreamed" (Rodgers & Hammerstein, arr.: John McLean, Elling) - 6:07
9. "The Enchantress" (Joey Calderazzo, Kurt Elling, Wallace Stevens) - 6:24
10. "Skylark" (Hoagy Carmichael, Johnny Mercer) - 8:12

== Personnel ==
- Kurt Elling – vocals
- Marquis Hill – flugelhorn, trumpet
- Branford Marsalis – soprano saxophone
- Joey Calderazzo – piano
- Stu Mindeman – piano, Hammond B3 organ
- John McLean – electric guitar, acoustic guitar
- Clark Sommers – double bass
- Jeff "Tain" Watts – drums
