= Dedicated to You: Kurt Elling Sings the Music of Coltrane and Hartman =

Live album by Kurt Elling
- Released: June 23, 2009
- Recorded: January 21, 2009, The Allen Room, Jazz at Lincoln Center, Lincoln Center for the Performing Arts, New York City
- Genre: Vocal jazz
- Length: 61:39
- Label: Concord
- Producer: Kurt Elling, Laurence Hobgood

Kurt Elling chronology
Nightmoves (2007)	Dedicated to You: Kurt Elling Sings the Music of Coltrane and Hartman (2009)	The Gate (2011)

Professional ratings
Review scores
Source	Rating
Allmusic	4/5 stars

Dedicated to You: Kurt Elling Sings the Music of Coltrane and Hartman is a 2009 live album by Kurt Elling, recorded at the Lincoln Center's American Songbook series.

The album is a tribute to the 1963 recording John Coltrane and Johnny Hartman by saxophonist John Coltrane and vocalist Johnny Hartman, and also features music from Coltrane's Ballads (1962).

At the 52nd Grammy Awards (held on January 31, 2010), Elling won the Grammy Award for Best Jazz Vocal Album for his performance on this album. Elling had previously been nominated for seven Grammy awards.

== Track listing ==
1. "All or Nothing at All" (Arthur Altman, Jack Lawrence) – 6:52
2. "It's Easy to Remember (And So Hard to Forget)" (Lorenz Hart, Richard Rodgers) – 4:07
3. "Dedicated to You" (Sammy Cahn, Saul Chaplin, Hy Zaret) – 6:35
4. "What's New?" (Johnny Burke, Bob Haggart) – 2:40
5. "Lush Life" (Billy Strayhorn) – 4:39
6. "Autumn Serenade" (Peter DeRose, Sammy Gallop) – 3:14
7. "Say It (Over and Over Again)" (Frank Loesser, Jimmy McHugh) – 6:40
8. "They Say It's Wonderful" (Irving Berlin) – 4:01
9. "My One and Only Love" (Guy Wood, Robert Mellin) – 3:26
10. "Nancy (With the Laughing Face)" (Phil Silvers, Jimmy Van Heusen) – 4:56
11. Acknowledgements – :40
12. "You Are Too Beautiful" (Richard Rodgers, Lorenz Hart) – 8:10

== Personnel ==
Performance

- Kurt Elling - vocal
- Ernie Watts - tenor saxophone (tracks 1, 4-7, 10, & 12)
- Laurence Hobgood - piano, arranger
- ETHEL (except track 8):
  - Cornelius Dufallo - violin
  - Mary Rowell - violin
  - Ralph Farris - viola
  - Dorothy Lawson - cello
- Clark Sommers - double bass
- Ulysses Owens - drums
- Jim Gailloreto - arranger

Production

- Kurt Elling and Laurence Hobgood - producers
- Mary Hogan - A&R
- May Ann Topper - executive producer, management
- Chris Dunn - executive producer
- David Earl Taylor - production coordination
- Larissa Collins - art direction
- Scott Stauffer - sound design
- Matt Berman - lighting design
- Bryan Farina and Rob Macomber - engineers
- Dave O'Donnell - mixing
- Paul Blakemore - mastering
- Mike Gassel - package design
- John Abbott - photography
