= Scott Earl Holman =

American jazz pianist

- Born: June 4, 1954 (age 71); Pittsburgh, Pennsylvania, United States
- Genres: jazz
- Occupations: Pianist; composer; recording artist
- Label: BEKA

Scott Earl Holman (born June 4, 1954) is a jazz pianist, composer and recording artist also recognized for his contributions to the Chicago jazz community.

== Biography ==
Scott Earl Holman was born in Pittsburgh, Pennsylvania. He moved to Miami, Florida in 1972 to attend the University of Miami. He left to study jazz piano with Wally Cirillo, who recorded with Charles Mingus and studied under John Cage.

Holman had his big debut as the house trio in "Hemmingways." "Hemmingways" boasted acts like Buddy Rich, Earl Hines, Lionel Hampton, and Fred Cole. Between 1972 and 1990, Holman performed at all of the major venues in South Florida. In 1985, he released his first album, Through Kathleen's Eyes, under his own record label, BEKA Records. His second album, Language of the Heart, was released in 1988, while Holman was performing at the Doral Hotel on Miami Beach.

Holman moved to Chicago in 1990 where he was featured live in several performances with Richie Cole on Larry Smith's WBEZ Jazz Party (91.5 fm). He founded the jazz programs at: Chambers, Chicago Blue Note (Beale St. Blues Cafe), Frankie's Blue Room, Tony's Paisons, Delaney & Murphy's, and Regina's. He gained recognition while running jazz programs in various Chicago clubs, playing with jazz artists including Ira Sullivan, Von Freeman, Lin Halliday, Eric Alexander, and Paul Wertico.

While at the Chicago Blue Note, Holman’s trio opened for such artists as Maynard Fergusen, Maria Muldaur, Leon Russell, and G.E. Smith. In 1997, Holman recorded and released Don't Wake the Kids with Pawel Jarzebski and Rusty Jones on Southport Records. His 2007 Crumblehead Records re-release of Don't Wake the Kids received more acclaim, particularly internationally. His recordings also feature Ira Sullivan, Larry Coryell, Paul Wertico and many other notable jazz luminaries. His 2012 release "Ode" with Ira Sullivan donates 100% profits to the homeless. Chicago Tribune jazz critic Howard Reich ranked "He Will Be Immanuel" with Ira Sullivan alongside Wynton Marsellis's Christmas release as one of the seven best of Christmas 2013. His recording "Song for Ai Wei Wei " with Larry Coryell, is a tribute to the free speech activist and artist who is under house arrest in China. It was released in 2014.

== Discography ==
- Through Kathleen's Eyes, 1985
- Language of the Heart, 1988
- Don’t Wake the Kids, 1997
- Don’t Wake the Kids: re-release 2007 Crumblehead Records
- Live @ Delaney and Murphy’s 2007
- Faith and Works, with Paul Wertico, 2009
- Ode, with Ira Sullivan, 2013
- He Will Be Immanuel, with Ira Sullivan, 2014
- For Jazz Audio Fans Only (VOL 3) Terashima Records Japan
