= Close Your Eyes (Kurt Elling album) =

Studio album by Kurt Elling
- Released: 1995
- Recorded: February 14–November 2, 1994
- Genre: Vocal jazz
- Length: 62:21
- Label: Blue Note

Kurt Elling chronology
Close Your Eyes (1995)	The Messenger (1997)

Close Your Eyes is the debut studio album by Kurt Elling, released in 1995.

At the 38th Grammy Awards Elling was nominated for the Grammy Award for Best Jazz Vocal Performance for Close Your Eyes.

== Reception ==
Professional ratings
Review scores
Source	Rating
Allmusic	3.5/5 stars
The Penguin Guide to Jazz Recordings	3.5/4 stars

The Allmusic review by Michael G. Nastos awarded the album four stars, and said "Chicago vocalist Elling pushes the envelope, challenging listeners and his musicians with beat poetry, ranting, and his Mark Murphy-ish singing. There's quite a bit of dramatist/actor in Elling, although the romantic in him is also pretty prevalent...There's clearly more in store for Elling as he matures, but this is as auspicious a vocal jazz debut as the world has heard.a worthy statement from Elling, who shows yet again that vocal jazz can be more than just easy listening"

== Track listing ==
1. "Close Your Eyes" (Bernice Petkere) - 6:06
2. "Dolores Dream" (Wayne Shorter, Kurt Elling) - 6:32
3. "Ballad of the Sad Young Men" (Tommy Wolf, Fran Landesman) - 6:17
4. "(Hide the) Salomé" (Elling, Laurence Hobgood) - 6:59
5. "Married Blues" (Hobgood, Eric Hochberg, Paul Wertico, Kenneth Rexroth) - 1:29
6. "Storyteller Experiencing Total Confusion" (Edward Petersen, Elling, Jim Heynen) - 6:15
7. "Never Say Goodbye" (Elling, Hobgood) - 5:30
8. "Those Clouds Are Heavy, You Dig?" (Dave Brubeck, Paul Desmond, Elling) - 3:07
9. "Wait till You See Her" (Richard Rodgers, Lorenz Hart) - 3:57
10. "Hurricane" (Herbie Hancock, Elling) - 4:50
11. "Now It Is Time That Gods Came Walking Out" (Hobgood, Hochberg, Wertico, Rainer Maria Rilke) - 2:03
12. "Never Never Land" (Jule Styne, Betty Comden, Adolph Green) - 5:00
13. "Remembering Veronica" (Elling, Hobgood) - 4:16

== Personnel ==
- Kurt Elling - vocals, arrangements
- Laurence Hobgood - piano (on all tracks except 8), synthesizer (tracks 7, 12, 13), arrangements
- Eric Hochberg - double bass (exc. 3, 6–9)
- Rob Amster - double bass (6, 8), electric bass (7, 12)
- Paul Wertico - drums (exc. 3, 8, 9), percussion (12)
- Von Freeman - tenor saxophone (4)
- Edward Petersen - tenor saxophone (6, 10)
- David Onderdonk - acoustic and electric guitar (7)

Production

- Laurence Hobgood - producer
- Kurt Elling, Paul Wertico - co-producers
- Lorenzo De' Medici - executive producer
- Roger Heiss - recording and mixing engineer
- Ed Bialach - assistant engineer
- Brigid Pearson - design
- Jimmy Katz, Bette Marshall - photography
