= Judy Roberts =

Jazz musician, composer, and arranger (born 1942)

- Born: Judy Loewy; October 3, 1942 (age 84); Chicago, IL, U.S.
- Genre: Jazz
- Occupations: Pianist, singer, composer, arranger
- Instrument: Piano
- Years active: ~1958–present
- Labels: Inner CIty; P-Vine; Pausa
- Website: judyroberts.com

Judy Roberts (born October 3, 1942) is a jazz pianist, singer, composer and arranger based in Chicago, IL. She released 15 albums during the period from 1979 to 2011. The Chicago Tribune has called her "Chicago's Favorite Jazz Woman."

== Musical career ==
Roberts started her professional career at age 15 and has gone on to perform at hundreds of jazz clubs, numerous festivals, and in multiple residencies in Chicago, Phoenix and Singapore.

Her eponymous first album was published by Inner City in 1979. It was followed by The Other World (1980), also on Inner City, which stayed on the Billboard Jazz Album charts for 20 weeks in 1980-81, peaking at #34. Her cover of Senor Blues from that album reached #1 on the jazz charts and in radio airplay.

Roberts' third album, Nights in Brazil (P-Vine Records), charted for six weeks in 1982, peaking at #38. That same year, Roberts made her first of four appearances at the Chicago Jazz Festival, playing with Neal Seroka on guitar, Michael Fiorino on bass and David Derge on drums.

Ray Brown and Jeff Hamilton joined Roberts on her fourth album, Trio (on Pausa Records, 1983). Roberts was a headline performer at the 1984 Clearwater Jazz Festival, along with Dave Brubeck, Herbie Hancock, Nat Adderly and Richie Cole. In this same time period, Laurel Masse recognized Roberts' support in launching her solo career after leaving the Manhattan Transfer.

Roberts returned to the Chicago Jazz Festival in 1990, performing on the closing day with Neal Seroka on guitar, Jim Cox on bass and Phil Gratteau on drums. Roberts collaborated with jazz singer Jackie Allen, including on two albums (Santa Baby and Autumn Leaves) in the late 1990s. In 1999, Roberts performed as part of the Chicago Jazz Festival's closing act with the Marian McPartland Trio, along with Willie Pickens and Jodie Christian. During this period, she was a frequent collaborator with drummer Rusty Jones.

Roberts performed with her husband, saxophonist Greg Fishman, at the 2002 North Sea Jazz Festival. In 2003, she reunited with McPartland as a featured guest on Piano Jazz, hosted by McPartland, performing a set of songs in front of a live audience.

She made her fourth appearance at the Chicago Jazz Festival in 2014, performing with Fishman as well as the Paulinho Garcia Quintet.

Roberts played multiple times at the renowned Jazz Showcase in Chicago, including as recently as 2025.

== Personal life ==
Roberts is the daughter of Robert Loewy (1916-2003), a jazz guitarist active in the Chicago jazz scene during the mid-20th century. Loewy performed with Roberts on her 1990 album My Heart Belongs to Daddy.

She is married to jazz saxophonist Greg Fishman.

In 2019, Roberts was diagnosed with amyloidosis, a rare form of blood cancer.

== Discography ==
- Judy Roberts Band (Inner CIty, 1979)
- The Other World (Inner City, 1980)
- Nights in Brazil (P-Vine Records, 1981))
- Trio (Pausa Records, 1983)
- You are There (Pausa Records, 1985)
- My Heart Belongs to Daddy (Self-published, 1990)
- Circle of Friends (Self-published, 1995)
- Santa Baby (with Jackie Allen, Self-published, 1998)
- Autumn Leaves (with Jackie Allen, RA Records, 1999)
- In the Moment (JR Records, 2002)
- Route 66 (JR Records, 2003)
- Watercolors (JR Records, 2003)
- Two for the Road (with Greg Fishman, JR Records, 2004)
- I'll Just Take It As It Comes (with Danny Long, 2009)
- So Lucky to be Loving You (with Wayne Messmer, CD Baby, 2011)
