= Eddie Johnson (musician) =

American jazz and blues tenor saxophonist (1920–2010)

- Birth name: Edwin Lawrence Johnson
- Born: December 11, 1920; Napoleonville, Louisiana, U.S.
- Origin: Chicago, Illinois, U.S.
- Died: April 7, 2010 (aged 89); South Side, Chicago, Illinois, U.S.
- Genres: Jazz, blues
- Instruments: Saxophone

Edwin Lawrence Johnson (December 11, 1920 – April 7, 2010) was an American jazz and blues tenor saxophonist.

== Early life ==
Johnson was born in Napoleonville, Louisiana, and moved with his family to Chicago at the age of two. As a teenager, Johnson sang in a vocal group. He graduated from Englewood High School and attended Wilson Junior College. In 1938, he and his bandmates were recruited to play for Kentucky State College, where Johnson received a scholarship and attended for eight months.

== Career ==
In 1946, Johnson joined trumpeter Cootie Williams and His Orchestra, appearing on several Capitol and Majestic recordings, until leaving to join Louis Jordan and His Tympany Five. He also played with Ella Fitzgerald and Duke Ellington. In 1981 and 1999, he released albums of new material, the latter on Delmark.

== 78/45rpm discography ==
- "Cold, Cold Heart" [U7379] // "Walk Softly" [U7380] (Chess 1488, 11/51)
- "At Last" [U7423] // "Sister Murphy" [U7381] (Chess 1503, 4/52)
- "This Love of Mine" [U7430] // "Back-Up" [U7431] (Chess 1512, 5/52)
- "Twin Rock" [U7468] // "Tiptoe" [U7470] (Chess 1544, 7/53)

== Albums ==
- Indian Summer (Nessa, 1981)
- Love You Madly (Delmark, 1999)

With Jodie Christian

- Front Line (Delmark, 1996)

With Kurt Elling

- The Messenger (Blue Note, 1997)
- This Time It's Love (Blue Note, 1998)

With James Moody

- Last Train from Overbrook (Argo, 1958)
