= Legends of Jazz =

Legends of Jazz with Ramsey Lewis was a 13-week, public television show, produced by the Chicago-based independent music entertainment company, LRSmedia and distributed by WTTW. It was first broadcast on public television stations in April 2006. The series was the first weekly network television jazz show in 40 years. The show was purchased by Savage Content on July 26, 2021.

Each themed episode featured intimate conversations and original performances by some of the world's leading musicians. Grammy Award-winning composer/pianist Ramsey Lewis hosted the series, which was produced in multi-camera HDTV and lossless Dolby Surround 5.1 audio.

== Episodes and guests ==
- The Golden Horns - Clark Terry, Roy Hargrove, Chris Botti
- The Jazz Singers - Al Jarreau, Kurt Elling
- The Great Guitars - Pat Metheny, Jim Hall
- Contemporary Jazz - George Duke, Lee Ritenour, Marcus Miller
- The Altos - David Sanborn, Phil Woods
- The Piano Masters - Dave Brubeck, Dr. Billy Taylor
- Roots: The Blues - Robert Cray, Keb' Mo'
- American Songbook - Jane Monheit, John Pizzarelli
- Latin Jazz - Eddie Palmieri, Dave Valentin
- The Tenors - Benny Golson, Chris Potter, Marcus Strickland
- Brazilian Jazz - Ivan Lins, Oscar Castro-Neves
- The Killer Bs - Joey DeFrancesco, Dr. Lonnie Smith
- NEA Jazz Masters 2006 - Tony Bennett, Chick Corea, Ray Barretto
