= Dorothy Lawson =

Canadian cellist and composer

Dorothy Lawson is a Canadian cellist and composer based in New York City. She is best known as a co-founder and artistic director of the string quartet ETHEL. On the founding of ETHEL she says, "we... realized that we were in the middle of a really powerful new upsurge of creative energy in music of our time that we were kind of the perfect vehicle for."

Prior to ETHEL, Lawson toured with Mikhail Baryshnikov's White Oak Dance Project, Bang on a Can All-Stars and Orpheus Chamber Orchestra. She was a founding member of the Rossetti and Roerich String Quartets, and served 10 years as faculty of Joseph Fuchs' Alfred University Summer Chamber Music Institute. Lawson was an orchestra member of the 2002 Off-Broadway production of Jason Robert Brown's The Last Five Years and the 2005 Broadway production of The Woman in White. She has been a member of the Ron Carter Nonet. Lawson appears on multiple recordings, including the GRAMMY Award-winning album Dedicated to You: Kurt Elling Sings the Music of Coltrane and Hartman She is a member of acclaimed Brazilian jazz pianist Marcelo Zarvos +Group. Lawson is a graduate of the Juilliard School and a current faculty at the Preparatory Division of Mannes College at the New School. She is quoted numerous times in the book How to Grow as a Musician: What All Musicians Must Know to Succeed by Sheila E. Anderson on the topic of how to balance work and family as a working musician.
