= Nightmoves =

Studio album by Kurt Elling
- Released: April 3, 2007
- Recorded: no date
- Studio: Avatar, New York City
- Genre: Vocal jazz
- Length: c. 61 minutes
- Label: Concord
- Producer: Joe Chiccarelli, Kurt Elling, Laurence Hobgood

Kurt Elling chronology
Man in the Air (2003)	Nightmoves (2007)	Dedicated to You: Kurt Elling Sings the Music of Coltrane and Hartman (2009)

Professional ratings
Review scores
Source	Rating
Allmusic	4.5/5 stars
The Penguin Guide to Jazz Recordings	4/4 stars

Nightmoves is a 2007 jazz album by vocalist Kurt Elling. It was the first Elling album to be released by Concord Records.

== Critical reception ==
The Penguin Guide to Jazz praised the album as "elegance itself...a record of graceful adventure, packed with unexpected items...Elling's at the top of his game. There's no better male singer around."

Neil Tesser in The Chicago Reader wrote that Elling's album "brims with his best pure singing yet: he brings exuberant command to Betty Carter’s 'Tight' and focused restraint to a setting of the Whitman poem 'The Sleepers.' And on its many ballads his musicianship – intonation, dynamics, ornamentation – proudly challenges that of past pop and jazz giants."

== Track listing ==
1. "Nightmoves" (Michael Franks, Michael Small) - 4:23
2. "Tight" (Betty Carter) - 2:55
3. "Change Partners"/"If You Never Come to Me" (Irving Berlin)/(Antonio Carlos Jobim, Aloísio de Oliveira, Ray Gilbert) - 7:38
4. "Undun" (Randy Bachman) - 5:10
5. "Where Are You?" (Harold Adamson, Jimmy McHugh) - 5:27
6. "And We Will Fly" (Alan Pasqua, Kurt Elling, Phil Galdston) - 4:23
7. "The Waking" (Elling, Rob Amster, Theodore Roethke) - 4:13
8. "The Sleepers" (Fred Hersch, Walt Whitman) - 5:31
9. "Leaving Again"/"In the Wee Small Hours" (Keith Jarrett, Elling)/(Bob Hilliard, David Mann) - 5:04
10. "A New Body and Soul" (Johnny Green, Edward Heyman, Robert Sour, Frank Eyton) - 10:20
11. "I Like the Sunrise" (Duke Ellington) - 6:53

== Personnel ==
- Kurt Elling - vocals
- Laurence Hobgood - piano
- Willie Jones, III - drums, shakers (on tracks 1, 3 and 6)
- Christian McBride - bass (1–4, 6 and 10)
- Rob Amster - bass (5, 7, 8 and 11)
- Rob Mounsey - electric piano, keyboards (1, 4 and 6)
- Bob Mintzer - tenor sax (1 and 4)
- Guilherme Monteiro - guitar (3 and 6)
- Rumero Lubambo - guitar (7)
- Howard Levy - harmonica (3)
- Gregoire Maret - harmonica (6)
- The Escher String Quartet (5 and 8)
