= Flirting with Twilight =

Studio album by Kurt Elling
- Released: August 28, 2001
- Recorded: January 29–February 1, 2001
- Genre: Vocal jazz
- Length: 1:04:21
- Label: Blue Note
- Producers: Bill Traut, Kurt Elling, Laurence Hobgood

Kurt Elling chronology
Live in Chicago (2000)	Flirting with Twilight (2001)	Man in the Air (2003)

Flirting with Twilight is a 2001 studio album by Kurt Elling. It continues in the direction of his previous studio album, This Time It's Love, focusing mostly on ballad material.

When asked about his motivation for the album, Elling said “I remember reading that Bill Evans once said that he wanted to [play] as simply as possible, because he wanted people to hear what he had to say. And when I read that, I said to myself, `Yeah. How about that.’ It’s the less-is-more approach, and it shows a little accessibility. If it has the happy side effect of bringing more people to the music, that’s great."

== Reception ==
Professional ratings
Review scores
Source	Rating
Allmusic	3/5 stars
The Penguin Guide to Jazz Recordings	4/4 stars

Nate Chinen of The New York Times would later call Elling "the standout male jazz vocalist of our time" while praising both Flirting with Twilight and This Time It's Love as his best Blue Note albums for their "strenuously reined-in focus."

The Penguin Guide to Jazz praised the album, writing that it "confirms Elling as the finest singer of his generation. He opens on Glenn Miller's 'Moonlight Serenade' and turns it into a complex modernist epic, condensed into just four and a half minutes...Curtis Lundy's 'Orange Blossoms in Summertime' becomes a compelling jazz poem that honors the bassist's art and builds into something bigger and more ambitious. Jazz singers have rarely been drawn to Stephen Sondheim, but Kurt sees the merit in 'Not While I'm Around', from Sweeney Todd."

The Allmusic review by David R. Adler awarded the album three stars, and described it as "a worthy statement from Elling, who shows yet again that vocal jazz can be more than just easy listening"

Flirting with Twilight received a Grammy Award for Best Jazz Vocal Album, the fifth nomination in a row since Elling's debut. In addition, "Easy Living" was nominated for the Grammy Award for Best Arrangement, Instrumental and Vocals.

== Track listing ==
1. "Moonlight Serenade" (Glenn Miller, Mitchell Parish) - 4:22
2. "Detour Ahead" (Herb Ellis, Johnny Frigo, Lou Carter) - 5:34
3. "You Don't Know What Love Is" (Don Raye, Gene de Paul) - 5:36
4. "Orange Blossoms in Summertime" (Curtis Lundy, Kurt Elling) - 6:33
5. "Not While I'm Around" (Stephen Sondheim) - 6:26
6. "Easy Living" (Leo Robin, Ralph Rainger) - 5:22
7. "Lil' Darlin'" (Neal Hefti, Jon Hendricks) - 5:40
8. "I Get Along Without You Very Well" (Hoagy Carmichael, Jane Brown Thompson) - 3:37
9. "Blame It on My Youth" (Edward Heyman, Oscar Levant) - 3:27
10. "I'm Thru with Love" (Matty Malneck, Fud Livingston, Gus Kahn) - 4:57
11. "Say It" (Jimmy McHugh, Frank Loesser) - 4:57
12. "While You Are Mine" (F. Simon, Elling) - 7:46
13. "Je tire ma révérence" (Pascal Bastia) - 3:39

== Personnel ==
- Kurt Elling - vocals, arranger
- Laurence Hobgood - piano, arranger
- Clay Jenkins - trumpet
- Bob Sheppard - soprano saxophone, tenor saxophone
- Jeff Clayton - alto saxophone
- Marc Johnson - double bass
- Peter Erskine - drums

Production

- Kurt Elling, Laurence Hobgood and Bill Traut - producers
- Al Schmitt - recording engineer, mixing
- John Hendrickson - recording engineer
- Robert Hadley and Doug Sax - mastering
- Kurt Elling - art direction
- Edward Odowd - design
- John Fraser - collage
- Tiffany Pemberton - photography
- Zan Stewart - liner notes
