= The Gate (Kurt Elling album) =

Studio album by Kurt Elling
- Released: February 7, 2011
- Recorded: March 15–17, 2010
- Genre: Vocal jazz
- Length: 51:39
- Label: Concord
- Producer: Don Was

Kurt Elling chronology
Dedicated to You: Kurt Elling Sings the Music of Coltrane and Hartman (2009)	The Gate (2011)	1619 Broadway – The Brill Building Project (2012)

The Gate is a 2011 studio album by Kurt Elling, produced by Don Was. on November 30, 2011, the album received a Nomination in 54th Grammy Awards for Best Jazz Vocal Album.

== Reception ==
Professional ratings
Review scores
Source	Rating
Allmusic	4/5 stars

The Allmusic review by Thom Jurek awarded the album four stars, and described Elling as a "modern jazz visionary". Jurek said "The Gate presents Elling at the top of his game; it is a song cycle that is mesmerizing and mysterious as it is provocative and compelling."

== Track listing ==
1. "Matte Kudasai" (Adrian Belew, Bill Bruford, Robert Fripp, Tony Levin) - 4:19
2. "Steppin' Out" (Joe Jackson) - 4:48
3. "Come Running to Me" (Herbie Hancock, Allee Willis) - 6:06
4. "Norwegian Wood (This Bird Has Flown)" (Lennon and McCartney) - 5:39
5. "Blue in Green" (Miles Davis, Al Jarreau, Frank Martin) - 6:48
6. "Samurai Cowboy" (Marc Johnson, Kurt Elling) - 3:24
7. "After the Love Has Gone" (Bill Champlin, David Foster, Jay Graydon) - 5:51
8. "Golden Lady" (Stevie Wonder) - 5:47
9. "Nighttown, Lady Bright" (Don Grolnick, Elling) - 9:00

== Personnel ==
Performance

- Kurt Elling - vocals
- Laurence Hobgood - piano, arrangements
- John McLean - guitar
- John Patitucci - double bass
- Terreon Gully - drums, percussion (exc. 2, 5, 7)
- Kobie Watkins - drums (2, 5, 7)
- Lenny Castro - percussion (2, 3, 5, 6)
- Bob Mintzer - tenor saxophone (6, 7, 8)

Production

- Don Was - producer
- Kurt Elling, Laurence Hobgood - co-producers
- Chris Dunn - executive producer
- Bob Belden - arranger^{?}
- Chris Allen - engineer
- Ted Tuthill - assistant engineer
- Seth Presant - mixing engineer
- Paul Blakemore - mastering
- Mary Hogan - A&R
- Rachel E. Sullivan - package design
- Chris Faust - cover photo
- Steve Schapiro - back cover photo, inside photo
