= 1619 Broadway – The Brill Building Project =

1619 Broadway: The Brill Building Project

Studio album by Kurt Elling
- Released: September 25, 2012
- Recorded: May 3–5, 2012
- Studio: Sear Sound, New York City; The Village, Los Angeles
- Genre: Vocal jazz
- Length: 56:13
- Label: Concord Jazz
- Producer: Chris Dunn, Kurt Elling, Laurence Hobgood

Kurt Elling chronology
The Gate (2011)	1619 Broadway: The Brill Building Project (2012)	Passion World (2015)

Professional ratings
Review scores
Source	Rating
Allmusic	3.5/5 stars

1619 Broadway: The Brill Building Project is a 2012 album by Kurt Elling, recorded as a tribute to the songwriters of the Brill Building in New York City.

At the 55th Annual Grammy Awards, Elling was nominated for the Grammy Award for Best Jazz Vocal Album for his performance on this album, losing to Radio Music Society by Esperanza Spalding.

== Track listing ==
No.	Title	Writer(s)	Length
1.	"On Broadway"	Barry Mann, Cynthia Weil, Jerry Leiber, Mike Stoller	6:17
2.	"Come Fly with Me"	Sammy Cahn, Jimmy Van Heusen	6:22
3.	"You Send Me"	Sam Cooke	5:00
4.	"I Only Have Eyes for You"	Al Dubin, Harry Warren	5:42
5.	"I'm Satisfied"	Ernie Freeman, Mann, Weil	2:51
6.	"A House Is Not a Home"	Burt Bacharach, Hal David	7:01
7.	"Shoppin' for Clothes"	Kent Harris, Leiber, Stoller	3:30
8.	"So Far Away"	Carole King	6:00
9.	"Pleasant Valley Sunday"	Gerry Goffin, Carole King	3:20
10.	"An American Tune"	Paul Simon	5:27
11.	"Tutti for Cootie"	Duke Ellington, Jimmy Hamilton	5:23

Kurt Elling and Laurence Hobgood arranged tracks 1 and 8–11, track 2 together with John McLean, and track 5 with Clark Sommers. Laurence Hobgood provided arrangements for tracks 2, 4, and 6, and wrote all horn section arrangements.

== Personnel ==
Performance

- Kurt Elling - voice
- Laurence Hobgood - piano, electric piano (tracks 3, 9), organ (5, 7)
- Clark Sommers - bass (exc. 10)
- Kendrick Scott - drums (exc. 4, 10), congas (5, 9)
- John McLean - guitar (1, 3, 6, 8, 9), acoustic guitar (8)
- Tom Luer - tenor saxophone (2, 4, 11), alto saxophone (11)
- Kye Palmer - flugelhorn (2, 4, 11), trumpet (11)
- Joel Frahm - tenor saxophone (4, 7)
- Ernie Watts - tenor saxophone (5, 8)
- Christian McBride - voice (7)

Production

- Chris Dunn, Kurt Elling, and Laurence Hobgood - producers
- Darryl Pitt - co-producer, artist management
- Chris Allen - recording engineer (at Sear Sound, NY)
- Ted Tuthill - assistant engineer
- Kevin Harper, Owen Mulholland - assistants
- Seth Presant - engineer for additional recordings, and mixing (at The Village Studios, LA)
- Paul Blakemore - mastering
- Mary Hogan - A&R administration
- Phil Galdston - A&R consultant
- Larissa Collins - art direction
- Neal Ashby - package design
- Neil Tesser - liner notes
