= This Time It's Love (Kurt Elling album) =

Studio album by Kurt Elling
- Released: July 28, 1998
- Recorded: December 1997 – January 1998
- Studio: Hinge, Chicago, Il
- Genre: Vocal jazz
- Length: 54:54
- Label: Blue Note
- Producer: Laurence Hobgood, Kurt Elling, (Paul Wertico)

Kurt Elling chronology
The Messenger (1997)	This Time It's Love (1998)	Live in Chicago (2000)

This Time It's Love is a 1998 studio album by jazz vocalist Kurt Elling, accompanied as usual (since Elling's debut) by Laurence Hobgood on piano, Rob Amster on bass, and on drums Michael Raynor, who replaces Paul Wertico for the most part. On five of the twelve tracks guest musicians were invited, like guitarist David Onderdonk or Chicagoan veteran jazz musicians, violinist Johnny Frigo and Eddie Johnson. Hobgood and Elling co-produced the recording with Wertico as associate. Elling's third album was again released on the Blue Note label, which initially asked him "to do something more on the romantic side", as Elling writes in the liner notes. The album's repertoire is predominantly standard material with two songs added that were already played by the band, the lauded "Freddie's Yen for Jen" (see 'Reception' below) and McCoy Tyner's "My Love, Effendi" with lyrics by Elling, and "Where I Belong", another original. The bossa nova classic "Rosa Morena" by Dorival Caymmi is the first song Kurt Elling recorded in a foreign language, accompanied here just by acoustic guitar and bass.

== Reception ==
Professional ratings
Review scores
Source	Rating
Allmusic	4/5 stars
Penguin Guide to Jazz Recordings	3.5/4 stars

The Allmusic review by Tim Sheridan awarded the album four stars, and said Elling "finds a happy medium between romantic rumination and vocal experimentation. The highlight of the disc is "Freddie's Yen for Jen," a stellar jazz experience that comes pretty damn close to committing the pure emotion of love to tape". Morton and Cook wrote in their Penguin Guide to Jazz: "The highlight of This Time It's Love is a superb vocalese based on Lester Young's solo on "She's Funny That Way", but" –agreeing with Sheridan– "it is almost topped by "Freddie's Yen for Jen", which takes its inspiration from Freddie Hubbard and is one of the most compelling vocal performances in recent times."

Nate Chinen of The New York Times would later call Elling "the standout male jazz vocalist of our time" while praising both This Time It's Love and Flirting with Twilight as his best Blue Note albums for their "strenuously reined-in focus."

This Time It's Love received a Grammy Nomination for Best Vocal Jazz Performance, the third nomination in a row since Elling's debut, but lost to Shirley Horn's I Remember Miles.

== Track listing ==
1. "My Foolish Heart" (Victor Young, Ned Washington) - 4:03
2. "Too Young to Go Steady" (Jimmy McHugh, Harold Adamson) - 5:03
3. "I Feel So Smoochie" (Phil Moore) - 3:18
4. "Freddie's Yen for Jen" (P. Hubbard, Kurt Elling) - 7:21
5. "My Love, Effendi" (McCoy Tyner, Elling) - 3:36
6. "Where I Belong" (Laurence Hobgood, Elling) - 4:20
7. "The Very Thought of You" (Ray Noble) - 5:45
8. "The Best Things Happen While You're Dancing" (Irving Berlin) - 2:57
9. "Rosa Morena" (Dorival Caymmi) - 4:34
10. "She's Funny That Way" (Neil Moret, Richard A. Whiting) - 5:16
11. "A Time for Love" (Johnny Mandel, Paul Francis Webster) - 5:23
12. "Ev'ry Time We Say Goodbye" (Cole Porter) - 3:28

== Personnel ==
- Kurt Elling - vocals
- Laurence Hobgood - piano (on all tracks, except track 9)
- Rob Amster - double bass (exc. 10, 12)
- Michael Raynor - drums (1–5, 7, 8)
- Paul Wertico - drums (6, 11)
- David Onderdonk - guitar (3, 6, 9, 11)
- Brad Wheeler - soprano saxophone (6, 11)
- Eddie Johnson - tenor saxophone (2)
- Johnny Frigo - violin (3)

Production

- Laurence Hobgood, Kurt Elling - producers
- Paul Wertico - associate producer
- Steve Weeder - recording and mixing engineer
- Steve Johnson - assistant engineer
- Danny Leake - mastering
- Gordon H. Jee - art direction
- P. R. Brown - design, digital illustration
- Marc Hauser - photography
