= Club Nocturne =

Studio album by Yellowjackets
- Released: September 22, 1998
- Recorded: One on One Studios (North Hollywood, CA); Royaltone Studios (Burbank, CA); Sunset Sound (Hollywood, CA)
- Genre: Jazz
- Length: 53:48
- Label: Warner Bros.
- Producer: Yellowjackets

Yellowjackets chronology
Priceless Jazz (1998)	Club Nocturne (1998)	Best of Yellowjackets (1999)

Professional ratings
Review scores
Source	Rating
Allmusic	4/5 stars

Club Nocturne (1998) is the 13th studio album (14th overall) from the jazz group Yellowjackets, and their sixth and final release for the Warner Bros. label. The album was nominated for "Best Contemporary Jazz Album" Grammy Award.

The album, originally conceived as an all vocal jazz album, contains four tracks with vocals (five tracks for Japan release), featuring vocalists Kurt Elling, Brenda Russell, and Jonathan Butler. It is also the final album recorded during drummer Will Kennedy's original tenure.

The track "Spirit of the West" remains a staple in the Yellowjackets' live set.

== Track listing ==
No.	Title	Writer(s)	Length
1.	"Spirit of the West"	Russell Ferrante	5:07
2.	"Stick_to_it_ive_ness"	Ferrante	5:32
3.	"Up from New Orleans"	Bob Mintzer	5:34
4.	"The Evening News"	Ferrante, William Kennedy, Mintzer	4:16
5.	"Even the Pain"	Richard Page	5:24
6.	"Love and Paris Rain"	Ferrante, Kennedy, Brenda Russell	5:06
7.	"The Village Church"	Ferrante	4:50
8.	"Twilight for Nancy"	Ferrante, Haslip	5:25
9.	"Automat"	Ferrante, Haslip	6:58
10.	"All Is Quiet"	Mintzer, Kurt Elling	5:45

Bonus Track for Japanese Release
No.	Title	Writer(s)	Length
11.	"Living Inside Myself"	Gino Vannelli	7:30

== Personnel ==
Yellowjackets

- Russell Ferrante – keyboards
- Jimmy Haslip – bass
- Will Kennedy – drums
- Bob Mintzer – soprano saxophone, tenor saxophone

Guest Musicians

- Munyungo Jackson – percussion (5)
- James Harrah – guitars (6)

Guest Vocalists

- Kurt Elling – vocals (3, 10)
- Jonathan Butler – lead vocals (5), backing vocals (5)
- Richard Page – backing vocals (5)
- Brenda Russell – vocals (6)
- Gino Vannelli – lead vocals (11)

== Production ==
- Yellowjackets – producers
- Rich Breen – recording, mixing
- Doug Boehm – assistant engineer
- Troy Gonzalez – assistant engineer
- Steve Harrison – assistant engineer
- Curt Kroeger – assistant engineer
- Jason Mauza – assistant engineer
- David Nottingham – assistant engineer
- Jeff Robinette – assistant engineer
- Doug Sax – mastering at The Mastering Lab (Hollywood, California)
- Sally G. Poppe – production coordinator
- Margi Denton (Denton Design Associates) – art direction, design
- Hillary Sunenshine (Denton Design Associates) – art direction, design
- Marina Chavez – photography
- Gary Borman – artist management
