= Cape Breton International Drum Festival =

Annual festival in Nova Scotia, Canada

- Genre: Jazz, rock, metal
- Dates: End of April, beginning of May
- Locations: Cape Breton Regional Municipality, Nova Scotia, Canada
- Coordinates: 46°08′20″N 60°11′35″W
- Years active: 2001–2010
- Website: web.archive.org/web/20090225205702/http://cbdrumfest.ca/

The Cape Breton International Drum Festival, also known as the Cape Breton Drum Fest, was an annual event held in Cape Breton, Nova Scotia. The first festival was in 2001, and last was in 2010, around the beginning of May of each year. It was organized and owned by drummer and educator Bruce Aitken.
