= Jackie Allen (musician) =

American jazz vocalist (born 1959)

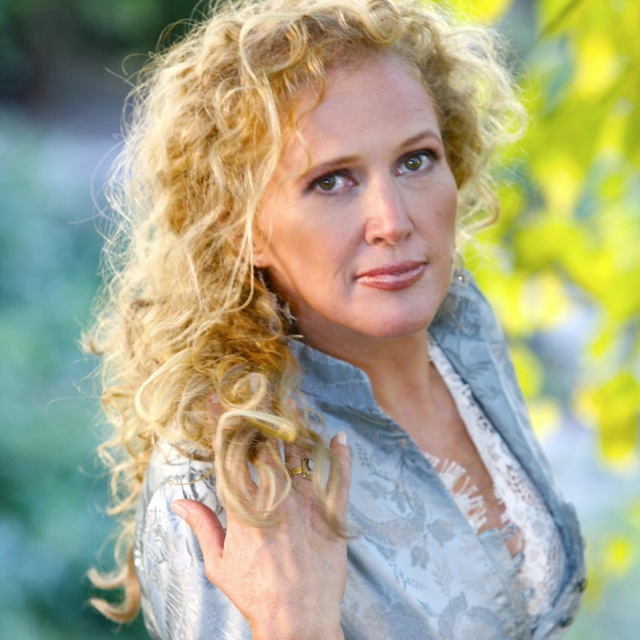

Background information
- Born: February 19, 1959 (age 67); Milwaukee, Wisconsin, U.S.
- Genres: Vocal jazz
- Occupation: Singer
- Years active: 1990–present
- Label: Blue Note
- Website: jackieallen.com

Jackie Allen is an American jazz vocalist. Influenced by jazz, folk, and pop singers, Allen is perhaps best known for interpretations of classic jazz ballads. According to critic Scott Yanow, she brings out "the beauty of the lyrics". Critic Thom Jurek said, "her gift with more pop-oriented material is utterly distinctive and even innovative, since there isn't another singer out there who phrases like her".

== Biography ==
=== Early life ===
Allen was born in Milwaukee, Wisconsin, and was raised in McFarland, a suburb of Madison. She grew up in a musical family. Her father was a Dixieland tuba player and her siblings played brass instruments. Allen played French horn. She studied singing and jazz at the University of Wisconsin in Madison, then moved back to Milwaukee, where she performed with Melvin Rhyne.

=== Musical career ===
Four years later she moved to Chicago and made her first album, Never Let Me Go (1994), for the Lake Shore Jazz record label. Her sidemen were pianist Brad Williams, saxophonist Edward Petersen, and bassist Larry Gray. She got to know pianist Judy Roberts, and they eventually made two albums together, Santa Baby and Autumn Leaves.

Producer Ralph Jungheim brought Allen to Los Angeles to record Which with first-call musicians including Red Holloway, Gary Foster, and Bill Cunliffe, who served as the musical director for the recording. The project was successful and the label sent Jackie and her group on an Asian tour, including an appearance as the first jazz artists to perform at the Beijing Music Festival.

In 1999 she began performing in a duo with Hans Sturm. They performed at the Edinburgh Festival Fringe where Frank Proto heard them and invited them to record for his Red Mark label. Dave Nathan wrote of the recording for the All Music Guide "This album ups the ante for voice/bass combination. It demands serious and committed listening. Landscapes: Bass Meets Voice will leave most breathless."

Since 2002 Allen has performed and recorded primarily with an ensemble that includes John Moulder (guitar), Dane Richeson(percussion), and Hans Sturm (bass) with the addition of either Ben Lewis, Laurence Hobgood, or Tom Larson (keyboards), Orbert Davis or Tito Carillo (trumpets), and Steve Eisen (woodwinds). She produced The Men in My Life with Eric Hochberg and it was picked up by the Chicago label A440 in 2003. The label signed her to do an additional recording, Love Is Blue, produced by Rob Mathes and released the following year. After the A440 label folded, she signed with Blue Note Records and working with Eric Hochberg once again, released Tangled (2006). She was dropped from the label after EMI/Blue Note was sold in 2007 to Terra Firma.

In 2008 Allen was approached by the Muncie Symphony Orchestra in Indiana to create a project for their 60th Anniversary Season. The result was the 2009 live album Starry Night that features Allen's band with the symphony in a program of star-themed tunes arranged by John Clayton, Frank Proto, Bill Cunliffe, Mark Buselli, and Matt Harris.

After moving to Lincoln, Nebraska in 2011, Allen has continued to tour and record for the small Avant Bass label. My Favorite Color (2014), a collection of new and old standards, was her first studio release since Tangled. Christopher Loudon, writing for Jazz Times remarked "Eight years’ absence from the recording studio has done nothing to diminish Jackie Allen’s allure. The voice-dusky, mellow and wise, is as spellbinding as ever." In 2017 she released Rose Fingered Dawn, set of original songs written for her by Hans Sturm, to critical acclaim. John McDonough wrote in Downbeat Magazine that Jackie "showcases a polished virtuosity...a shimmering paradigm of stylish and sophisticated jazz singing."

=== Teaching career ===
Allen began teaching in Milwaukee at the Wisconsin Conservatory of Music in 1989 and stayed on the faculty until 1992. In 1991 David Bloom hired her to teach at the Bloom School of Jazz in Chicago where she stayed for two years. For 12 years she taught at the Old Town School of Folk Music.

Elmhurst College invited Allen to join their faculty in 2002, and she stayed there until 2005 when Roosevelt University offered her a position. She taught at Roosevelt until 2008 and then taught private jazz vocal lessons and songwriting at Ball State University, The Cornerstone Center for the Arts, and the E. B. Ball Center in Indiana.

In 2011 she moved to Nebraska and taught at Doane University and the University of Nebraska–Lincoln.

Allen also taught a torch-singing class as a community outreach project, helping small groups of adult students learn to sing in public.

== Discography ==
- Never Let Me Go (Lake Shore Jazz, 1994)
- Santa Baby (with Judy Roberts, Self-published, 1998)
- Which? (Naxos, 1999)
- Autumn Leaves (with Judy Roberts, RA Records, 1999)
- The Men in My Life (A440 Music, 2003)
- Tangled (Blue Note, 2004)
- Love Is Blue (A440 Records, 2004)
- Starry Night (Avant Bass, 2009)
- Rose Fingered Dawn (Avant Bass, 2017)
- A Romantic Evening with Jackie Allen (Avant Bass, 2019)
