= Orbert Davis =

- Born: 1960; Chicago, Illinois, U.S.
- Genres: Jazz
- Occupation: Musician
- Instrument: Trumpet
- Website: orbertdavis.com

Orbert C. Davis (born 1960) is an American jazz trumpeter and bandleader.

== Biography ==
Davis was born in Chicago and raised in Momence, Illinois. He began playing trumpet around the age of ten, but was not formally instructed until Charles Danish, an elementary school teacher, found him a trumpet teacher and drove him to lessons. He graduated with a degree in trumpet performance from DePaul University, then received a master's degree in jazz pedagogy from Northwestern University. Davis is Associate Professor of music at the University of Illinois at Chicago.

Davis has recorded studio albums and over 3000 radio and television commercials. He is active in music education and co-founded and directs MusicAlive! (associated with the Chicago Jazz Philharmonic, which he also founded and directs). He is the host of the jazz radio show The Real Deal with Orbert Davis on WDCB.

He performs regularly with his group, Orbert Davis with Strings Attached, and is a member of the Chicago Jazz Ensemble. Davis is the co-founder and Artistic Director of the Chicago Jazz Philharmonic. Founded in 2004, it is the only professional orchestra in the nation solely dedicated to performing Third Stream music.

He was featured soloist at the 1996 Chicago Jazz Festival, performing Miles Davis and Gil Evans' "Sketches of Spain". With Lester Bowie and Jon Faddis in October 1999, Davis was a featured performer for the Jazz Institute of Chicago's "Tribute to Louis Armstrong: Legacy for the Millennium" where he performed compositions from Armstrong's Hot 5 and Hot 7 recordings. This performance was repeated in August 2001 at the Chicago Jazz Festival. He has performed with Dr. John, Kurt Elling, Ramsey Lewis, Thelonious Monk, Wynton Marsalis, Grover Washington Jr., Ernie Watts, Stevie Wonder, and the Smithsonian Jazz Masterworks Orchestra.

Davis and Mark Ingram own Orbark Productions. Their credits include projects for Atlantic, Capitol, CBS, Epic, MCA, and the Warner Bros. record labels. Other projects include arrangements and on-camera performances for films such as A League of Their Own and The Babe.

== Discography ==
- Unfinished Memories (1996)
- Priority (2001)
- Blue Notes (2004)
- Collective Creativity (2008)
- DuSable to Obama (2010)
- Home & Away (2012)
- Sketches of Spain (2012)
- Havana Blue (2016)
- Paradise Blue (2017)
- The Chicago River (2019)
