= Green Mill Cocktail Lounge =

Entertainment venue in Uptown, Chicago, Illinois, USA

Green Mill
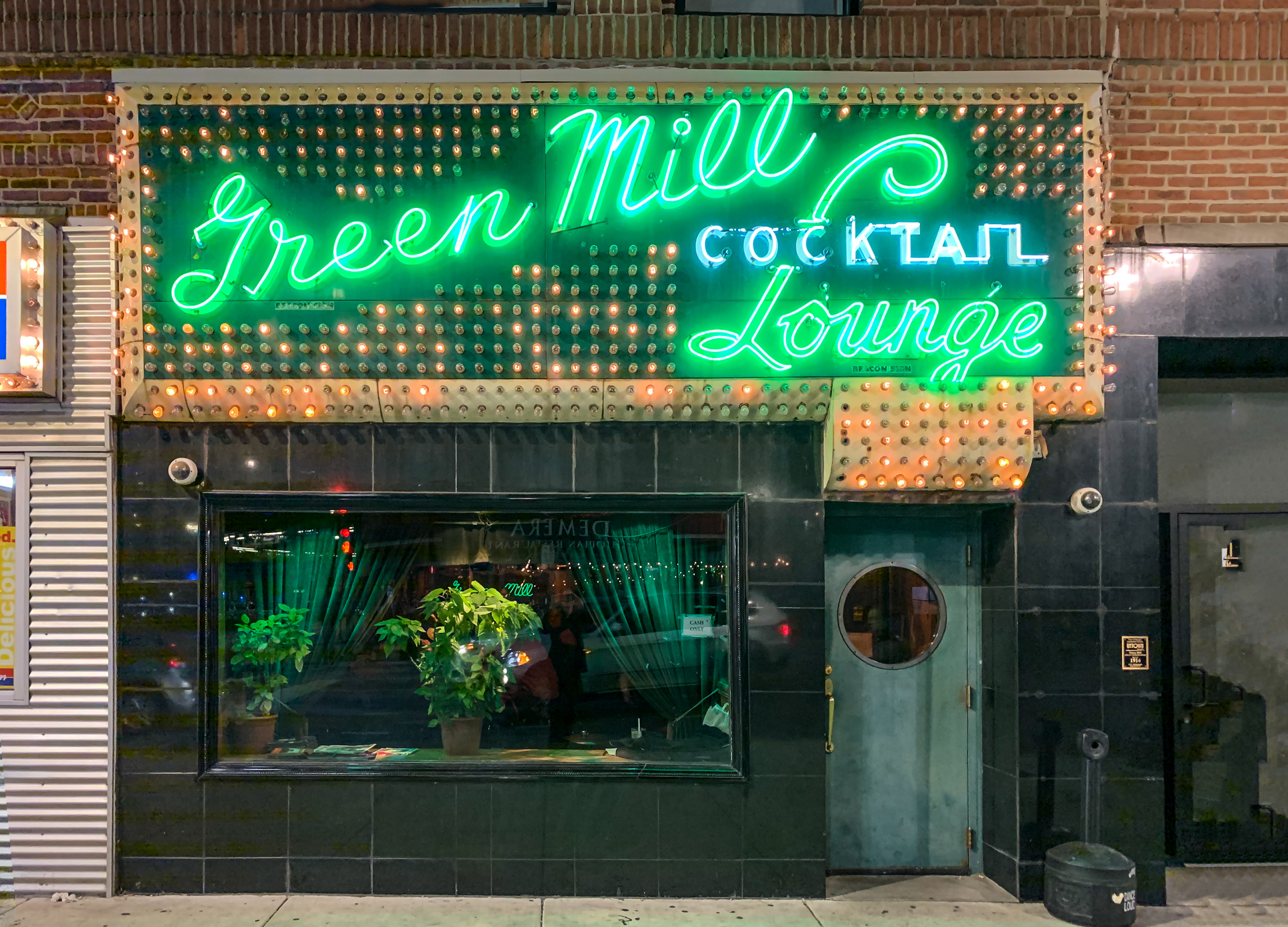
- Interactive map of Green Mill
- Former names: Pop Morse's Roadhouse; Hoffman Bros. Saloon; Green Mill Gardens; Montmartre Cafe; Green Mill Tavern
- Address: 4802 N. Broadway; Chicago; United States
- Coordinates: 41.9692°N 87.6599°W

Construction
- Opened: 1898

Website
- greenmilljazz.com

The Green Mill Cocktail Lounge (also known as the Green Mill Jazz Club or simply the Green Mill) is a bar and entertainment venue on Broadway in Uptown, Chicago.

The Green Mill's origins can be traced to the late 1890s. Over the years its name, ownership, and building have undergone numerous changes, but it has remained on the same city block since its inception, and in the same building (albeit different subsections) since 1921. The current venue opened in 1935.

The Green Mill is known for its jazz performances, along with its connections to Chicago mob history. It is considered one of the most famous bars/jazz clubs in the United States and the most iconic in Illinois.

== History ==
=== 1890s–1900s ===
The Green Mill traces its roots to Pop Morse's Roadhouse, a saloon founded by Charles E. "Pop" Morse at the corner of Lawrence Avenue and Broadway (then known as Evanston Avenue). While commonly said to have opened in 1907, city records indicate the saloon opened in 1898.

The saloon became a popular spot for mourners from the nearby Graceland and Saint Boniface cemeteries. After Morse died in 1908, his son-in-law Charles Hoffman assumed control. In 1909, together with his brother Frank, Hoffman added a beer garden to the property in and renamed it the Hoffman Bros. Saloon.

=== 1910s–1945 ===
In 1910, real estate developer and tavern owner Tom Chamales began leasing the property from the Hoffmans and changed the club's name to "Morse's Cafe & Garden." After acquiring adjacent land, Chamales demolished the original venue in 1914 and replaced it with a large, two-story complex he named Green Mill Gardens as a nod to the famous Moulin Rouge ("Red Mill") in Paris. Chamales chose the color green to avoid association with a nearby red-light district.

The Green Mill Gardens complex had a huge green windmill on the roof and included offices, a restaurant, an indoor ballroom, and an outdoor beer garden. The beer garden featured a large open courtyard and stage for live entertainment. In its early years, the Green Mill was a popular hangout for movie actors from nearby Essanay Studios.

In 1921, the federal government and the City of Chicago filed lawsuits against the Green Mill for allegedly selling alcohol in violation of Prohibition and for allowing music and dancing past 1 a.m. That same year, Chamales constructed an addition along Broadway that still stands today. A relief of a windmill (still visible) and the words "Green Mill Gardens" (now obscured by signage) are engraved in the stone facade above the former entrance.

Despite dismissal of the federal lawsuit, the Green Mill Gardens briefly shut down in 1923 and the western half of the property housing the namesake garden courtyard was sold to Balaban and Katz. Former manager Henry Horn quickly reopened the Green Mill as the Montmartre Cafe. The following year, Balaban & Katz demolished the garden courtyard in order to construct the Uptown Theatre; the rooftop windmill was removed around this time.

A judge ordered the closure of the Montmartre Cafe in 1926 for violating Prohibition. Later that year, it reopened as the New Green Mill Cafe under new ownership reputedly tied to organized crime. Around this time, "Machine Gun" Jack McGurn of Al Capone's Chicago Outfit became part-owner of the club. Singer and comedian Joe E. Lewis was attacked by McGurn's men after he refused to renew a contract keeping him at the Mill, because he had been offered more money to appear at "The New Rendezvous". Lewis's throat was slashed, but he survived. The incident inspired the 1957 film The Joker Is Wild.

A curved booth popularly known as "Al Capone's booth" is still in the club, west of the short end of the bar. With a view of both the Mill's main and side entrances, the location was (allegedly) perfect for Capone to see who came into the club and to make a quick exit if needed. (However, the current-day Green Mill did not exist at that site until 1935, three years after Capone went to prison.) Presently, a small table behind the bar holds a shrine to Al Capone as a tribute to earlier days.

Another popular story recounts that during Prohibition, patrons of Green Mill Gardens could escape through a series of coal tunnels that ran under the entire block, which also connect to the present-day club through a trap door behind the bar.

Between 1927 and 1932, the Green Mill underwent multiple closures, ownership transfers, and name changes (including "Ye Old Green Mill" and "Lincoln Tavern Town Club").

Just months before the end of Prohibition in April 1933, a fire gutted the building and caused $100,000 worth of damage (equivalent to $2,487,147 in 2025). The building was repaired, and with alcohol once again legal, reopened in its current space in 1935 as the Green Mill Tavern. The interior was remodeled in 1942, but the extent of the renovation is unclear.

After Prohibition ended, the Green Mill became more reputable and attracted many popular acts including Louis Armstrong, Billie Holiday and Al Jolson, along with cabaret icons such as Texas Guinan. Guinan, a one-time rodeo rider and vaudeville performer, reinvented herself during Prohibition as a bawdy, breezy emcee for cabaret shows at spots like the 300 Club in New York before coming to Chicago from 1928 to 1930.

The Green Mill

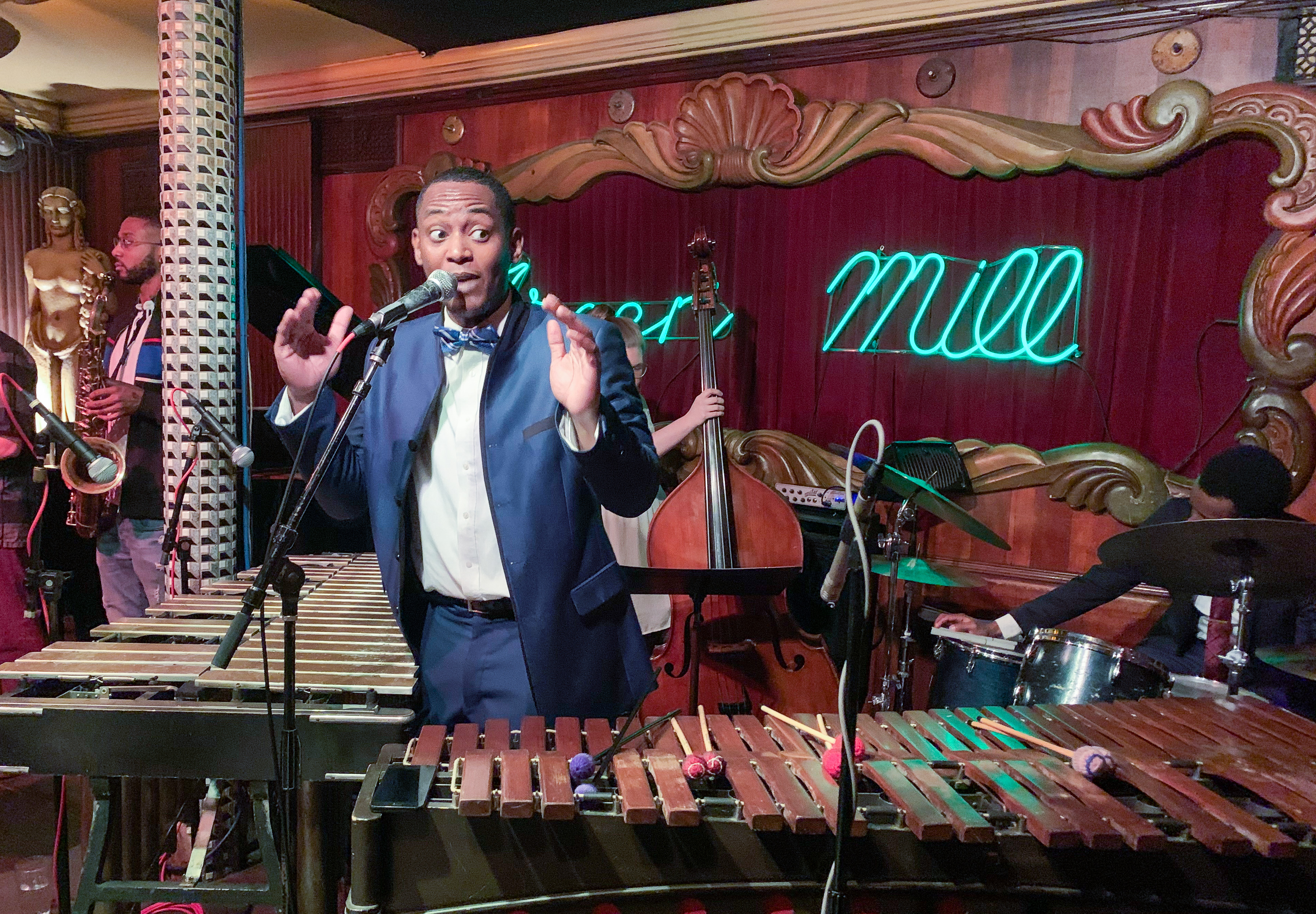
Vibraphonist Thaddeus Tukes on stage

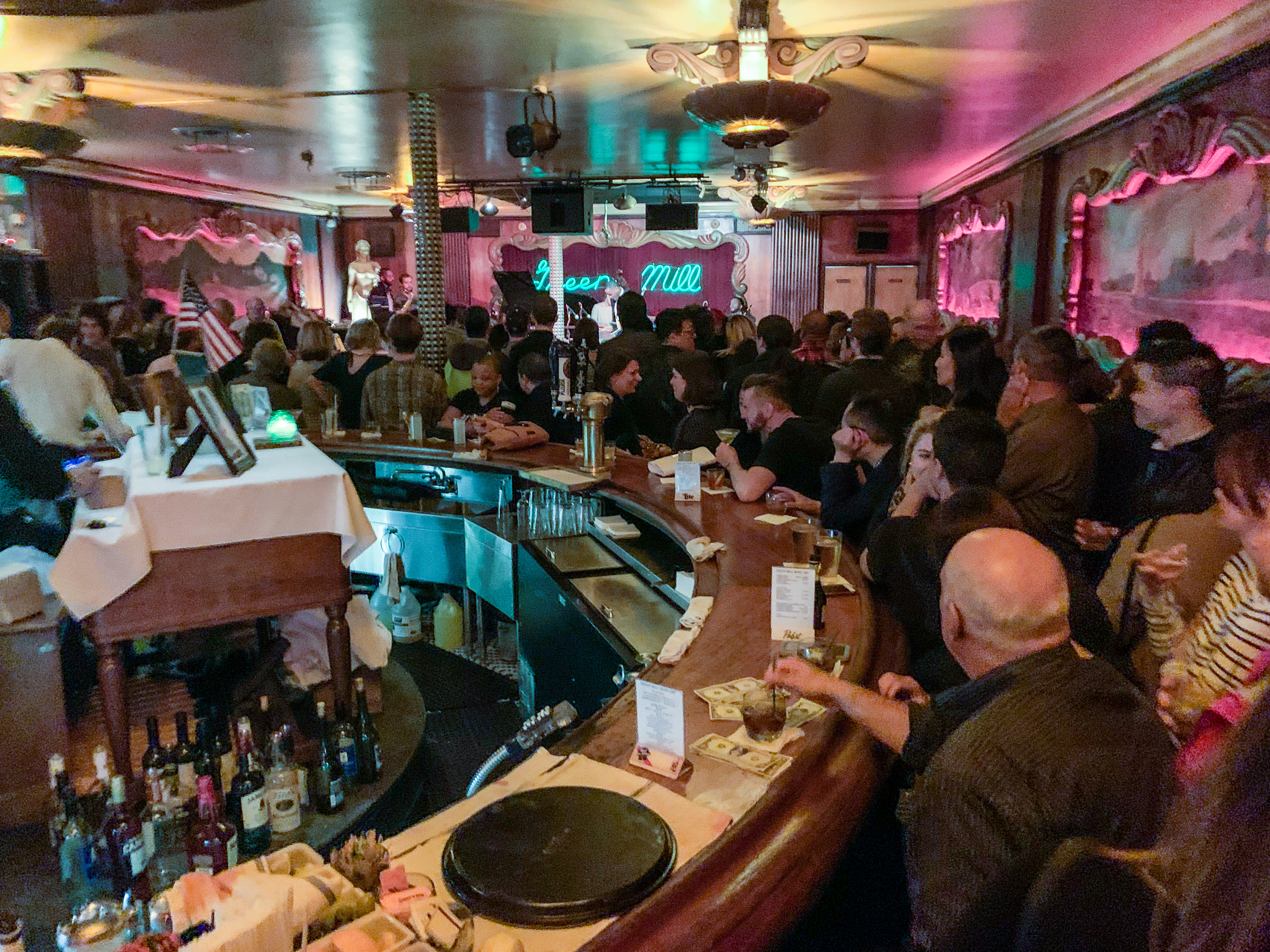
At the bar. At left is a small table behind the bar honoring Al Capone.

=== 1945–present ===
The business began to struggle following World War II. In 1940, the Green Mill was purchased by the Batsis brothers, who sold it in 1960 to Steve Brend. As a youngster, Brend had worked for Jack McGurn and was later called the "Mayor of Uptown" for his gregarious nature and proclivity for storytelling. During that period, the Green Mill went from a nightlife hub to a place where day drinking and drug use were the norm.

In 1986, the Mill was purchased and revitalized by Dave Jemilo, a South Sider and former owner of the bar Deja Vu. Since its reopening, the Green Mill has become widely known as one of the most popular jazz venues in Chicago, with a variety of music each weeknight and guest performers on Friday and Saturday evenings. June 19, 2026 marked both the 40th anniversary of Jemilo's ownership and the Mill's formal transition to new owners (and longtime employees) Jason Cole and Jill Skintges.

Performers, who frequently play to a packed house, range from jazz quartets and vocalists to swing orchestras. During performances, patrons are asked to silence their phones and refrain from loud talking.

Over the years, numerous jazz artists have recorded live albums at the Green Mill including Von Freeman, Kurt Elling, Patricia Barber, Geof Bradfield, Ari Brown, Frank Catalano, George Freeman & Mike Allemana, the Mike Jones Trio, John Moulder, Sabertooth and Matt Ulery. Chicago-based comic Whitney Chitwood recorded The Bakery Case (2019) live at the Mill; it reached #9 on the Billboard comedy chart and was the first comedy album to be recorded at the club.

In addition to music, the Mill has hosted an Uptown Poetry Slam since 1986. The Slam currently takes place the third Sunday of each month.

== In popular culture ==
A documentary film, The Green Mill: A Real Chicago Joint, premiered February 2026 in Chicago. The film was directed and produced by Paul Carr, who also worked as a bartender at the Green Mill from 1986 - 1995.

Over the years, the Green Mill has appeared in films such as Thief (1981), Next of Kin (1989), V. I. Warshawski (1991), Prelude to a Kiss (1992), Folks! (1992), A Family Thing (1996), Soul Food (1997), High Fidelity (2000), The Lake House (2006), The Dilemma (2011) and Chicago Overcoat (2010).

In the Star Trek: Voyager episode "Course: Oblivion," the Green Mill is described by the character Tom Paris as a "genuine speakeasy". In the Chicago P.D. episode "We Don't Work Together Anymore," Voight and Olinski enter the Green Mill to question a suspect and refer to it as "Al Capone's old joint".
