= Wesla Whitfield =

American singer (1947–2018)

- Wesla Whitfield, from a 1976 newspaper
- Born: Weslia Marie Edwards; September 15, 1947; Santa Maria, California, U.S.
- Died: February 9, 2018 (aged 70); St. Helena, California, U.S.
- Occupation: Singer

Wesla Whitfield (born Weslia Marie Edwards, September 15, 1947 – February 9, 2018) was an American singer who recorded more than a score of albums and performed at Carnegie Hall and the White House, among other sites. She used a wheelchair for the last four decades of her life, after surviving a gunshot injury. She specialized in the American standards genre of music.

== Early years ==
Born in Santa Maria, California, Whitfield was the daughter of Vernon Edwards and Eleanor Smith Edwards. She studied at Pasadena City College and received a music degree from San Francisco State University. Her fondness for the American standards genre of songs began as a child, when she found her mother's old sheet music and began playing the songs on a piano and singing them. "Especially, the lyrics were wonderful," she said, "sentiments that I felt were something I could relate to." Whitfield's initial public performances came when she was a singing waitress at a Shakey's Pizza restaurant. She also sang in her high school's chorus and performed in a production of Brigadoon as a senior.

== Career ==
Whitfield resisted efforts to classify her style of singing. Although she was described by others as a jazz singer or a cabaret singer, she once said, "I don't claim to be anything. I just show up at the gig." She was shot in an attempted robbery in 1977; she survived and used a wheelchair after that time.

Trained as a coloratura soprano, in 1971 Whitfield began to sing in the chorus of the San Francisco Opera. Finding that type of music unsatisfying, she sometimes followed operatic performances with stops at piano bars, where she performed familiar songs whose composers included Irving Berlin, Cole Porter, and Rodgers and Hart. She later explained her preference by saying: "In opera, the voice was the only thing of importance. The Lyric and the story didn't count, and that was boring to me. I'm very interested in the song and the story that it has to tell."

Whitfield's opera career lasted four years. Her change in orientation took her first to working as a singing cocktail waitress and then to singing in nightclubs, including the Rrazz Room and the Empire Plush Room in San Francisco, the Cinegrill in Los Angeles, The Oak Room of the Algonquin Hotel in Manhattan, and Scullers Jazz Club in Boston.

In 1977, two boys approached Whitfield on a street in San Francisco and told her to go with them. As she turned away, one shot at her. The bullet hit her spine, paralyzing her from the waist down. She sang for about three months soon after the shooting but stopped because "... it was quite boring because I really wasn't there mentally or emotionally." When she resumed performing, her husband carried her on stage to sit on a stool or chair because she thought her wheelchair would distract from her singing.

In 1985, she and her husband created the Myoho label for her albums. After three releases, HighNote Records began distributing Whitfield's recordings.

In the late 1990s, Whitfield and Greensill toured with a production of Life Upon the Wicked Stage, a "semi-autographical show" featuring Whitfield's singing. A review in The San Francisco Examiner described the show as "An absolutely marvelous evening of musical theater."

== Personal life ==
Whitfield was married to, and divorced from, Richard Whitfield and Wilfred Berg. She married jazz pianist Mike Greensill in 1986. He had been her pianist and arranger, and he continued in those roles after their marriage.

== Death ==
On February 9, 2018, Whitfield died of complications of bladder cancer at her home in St. Helena, California, at age 70.

== Awards ==
Whitfield received five Cabaret Gold Awards from the San Francisco Council on Entertainment.

== Discography ==
- Lady Love (Myoho, 1980)
- Just for a Thrill (Myoho, 1986)
- Until the Real Thing Comes Along (Myoho, 1987)
- Nobody Else but Me (Landmark, 1988)
- Lucky to Be Me (Landmark, 1991)
- Live in San Francisco (Landmark, 1991)
- Beautiful Love (Cabaret, 1993)
- Nice Work (Landmark, 1994)
- Seeker of Wisdom and Truth (Cabaret, 1994)
- Teach Me Tonight (HighNote, 1997)
- My Shining Hour (HighNote, 1997)
- High Standards (HighNote, 1998)
- With a Song in My Heart (HighNote, 1999)
- Let's Get Lost (HighNote, 2000)
- The Best Thing for You Would Be Me (HighNote, 2002)
- September Songs (HighNote, 2003)
- In My Life (HighNote, 2005)
- Livin' On Love (HighNote, 2006)
- Message from the Man in the Moon (Pismo, 2007)
- The Best Things in Life (Live from the Razz Room) (Pismo, 2011)
