= List of best-selling albums by women =

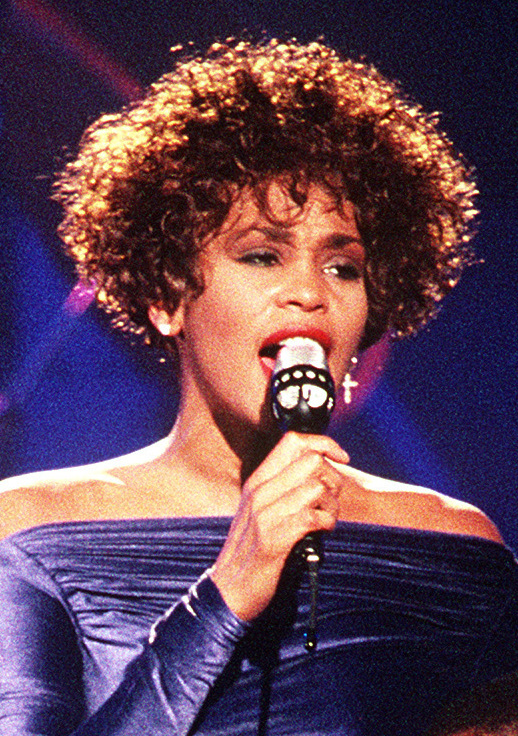
Whitney Houston's The Bodyguard soundtrack (with various artists) is the best-selling album credited to a woman.

The following albums, recorded by female solo artists and all-female groups, have sold at least 10 million copies. This list can contain any types of album, including studio albums, extended plays, greatest hits, compilations, soundtracks, and remixes. Various artists albums are eligible for inclusion if a woman is credited as the main artist by record charts and certifying organizations. The figures given do not take into account the resale of pre owned albums.

The Bodyguard soundtrack by Whitney Houston (with various artists) is the best-selling album credited to a woman; its sales are over 45 million copies since its release in November 1992.Come On Over by Shania Twain is recognized by Guinness World Records as the biggest-selling studio album by a solo female artist with over 40 million copies. Previous record holders of the best-selling album by a female artist include Carole King's Tapestry, and Whitney Houston's debut album as well as Madonna with True Blue according to the Guinness World Records (1989 and 1992 editions, respectively). Madonna also has the best-selling compilation album by a female artist (and solo artist) with The Immaculate Collection, which sold around 30 million copies. Other notable appearances include Shakira, as the only Latino artist in the list thanks to her crossover album Laundry Service, Hikaru Utada (Note: Utada came out as non-binary in 2021.) with First Love as the only Asian artist. Celine Dion has the only entirely non-English album with D'eux, which remains the best-selling French album of all time. The Spice Girls have the best-selling album by a girl group with Spice, while Mariah Carey has the best-selling Christmas album by a female artist with Merry Christmas. Whitney Houston' Whitney Houston remains the biggest-selling debut album of all time by a solo artist. Britney Spears' …Baby One More Time is the best-selling debut album by a teenage artist.

Many artists have multiple entries, led by Madonna with nine of her albums and followed by Celine Dion (seven), Mariah Carey (seven), Whitney Houston (six), while Britney Spears, Enya, Shania Twain, and Janet Jackson each have three. The first five artists also have multiple albums with sales of over 20 million copies worldwide. Currently, Adele's 21 is the best-selling album of the 21st century.

Groupings are based on different sales benchmarks, the highest being for claims of at least 40 million copies, and the lowest being for claims of 10 million copies. Albums are listed in order of number of copies sold and thereafter by the release year. (Note: To be on this list, albums released: before 1975 are required to have their claimed sales figures supported by 30% in certified units.; between 1975 and 1990 are required to have their claimed figures supported by 30–50% in certified units. (That is 1.33% for each additional year after 1975.); between 1990 and 2000 are required to have their claimed figures supported by 50–60% in certified units. (That is 1% for each additional year after 1990.); in 2000 and onwards are required to have their claimed figures supported by 60–80% in certified units. (That is 1.33% for each additional year after 2000.))

== List of albums ==
Key
*	Indicates a previous record holder of the best-selling music album by a woman

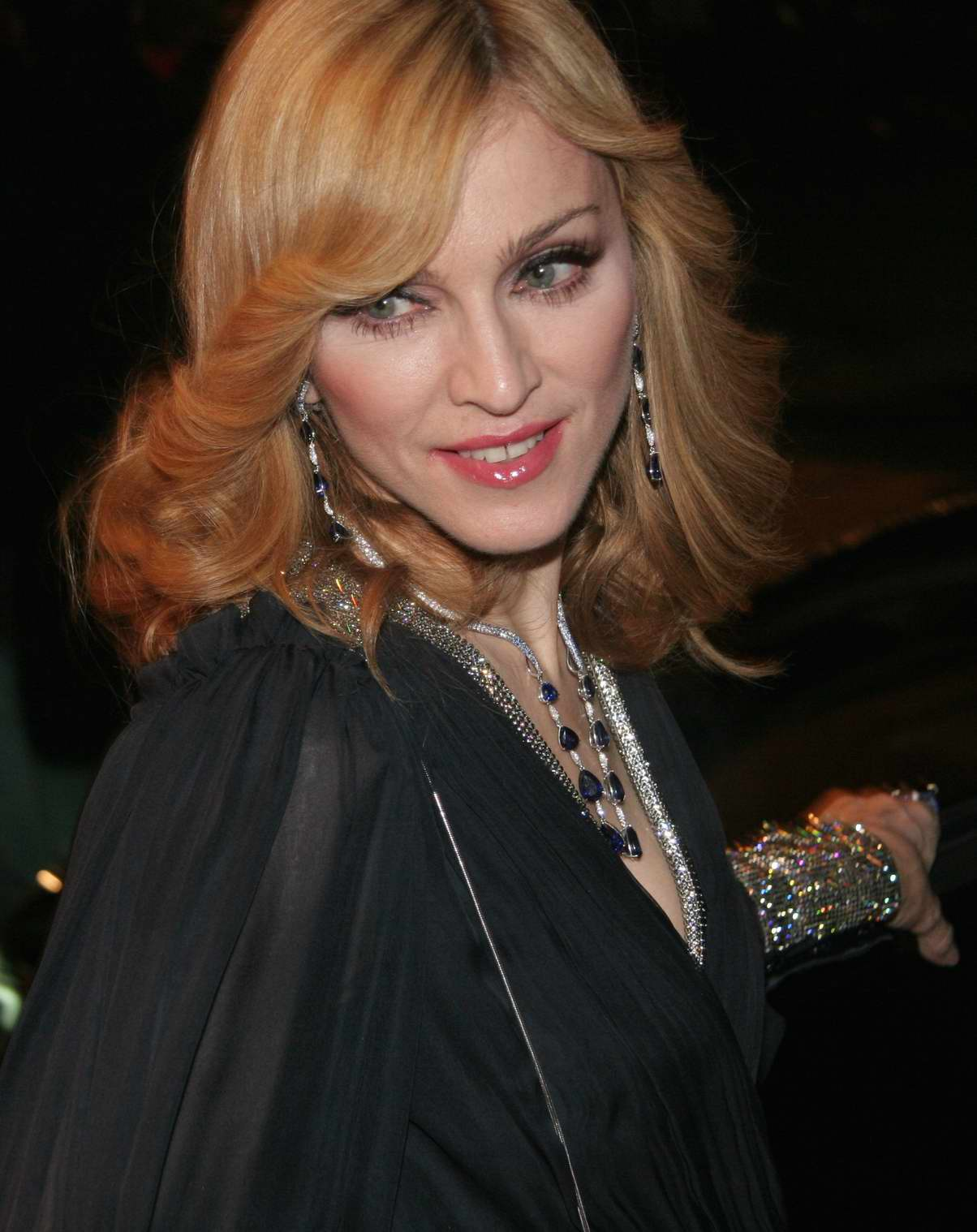
Madonna has nine albums on the list (1983–2005), more than any other artist.

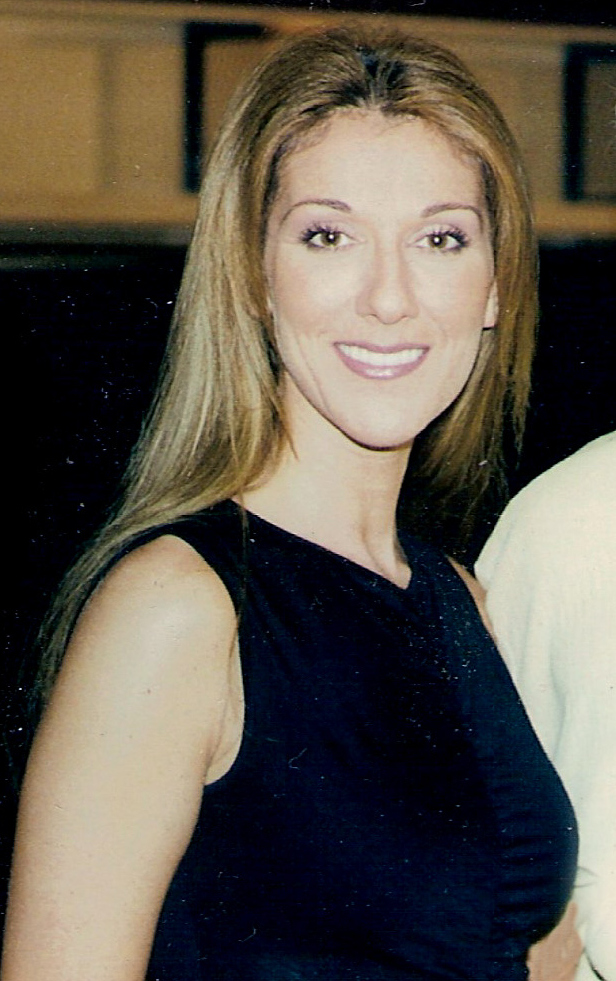
Celine Dion has seven albums on the list (1993–2002).

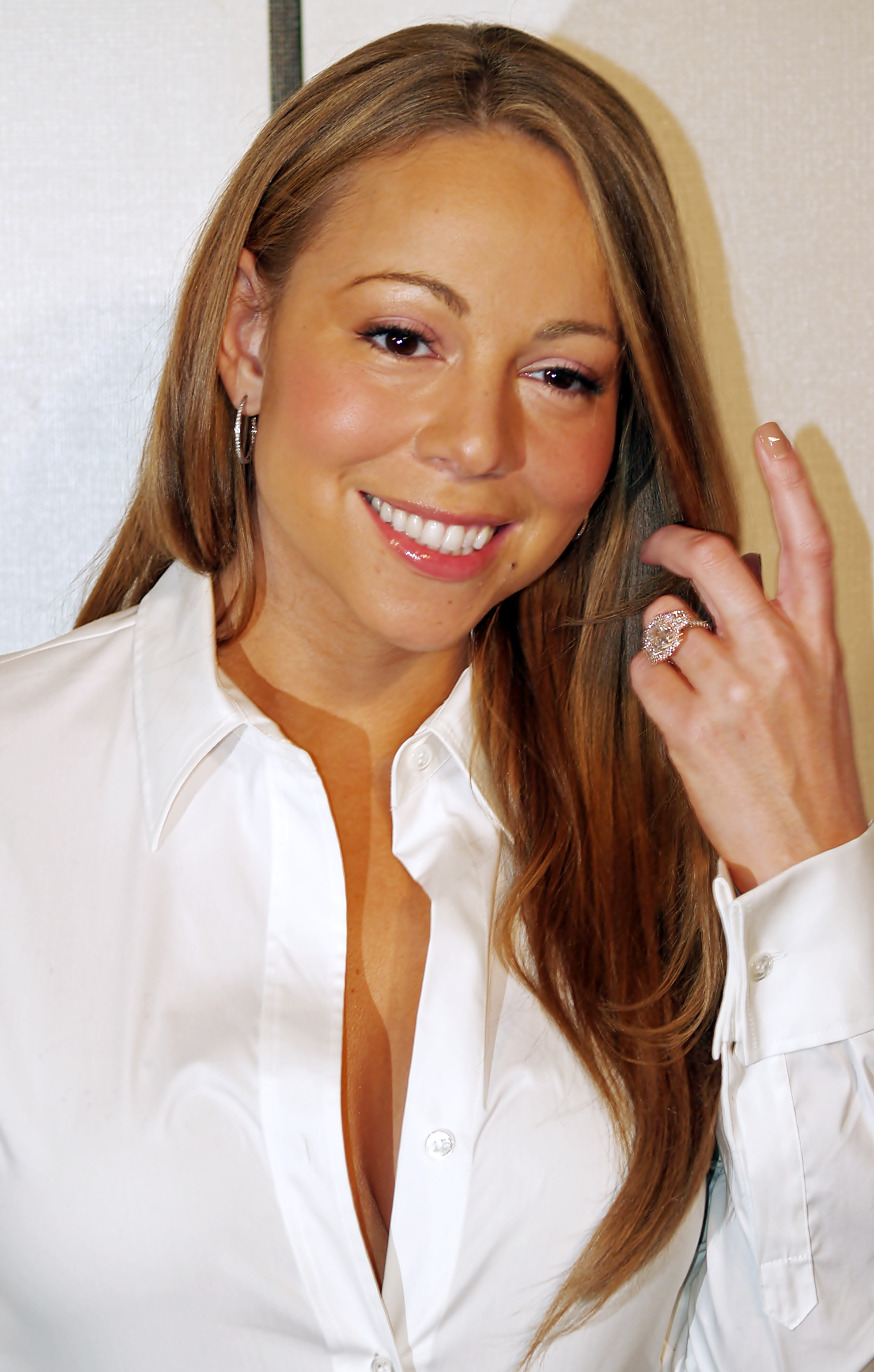
Mariah Carey has seven albums on the list (1990–2005).

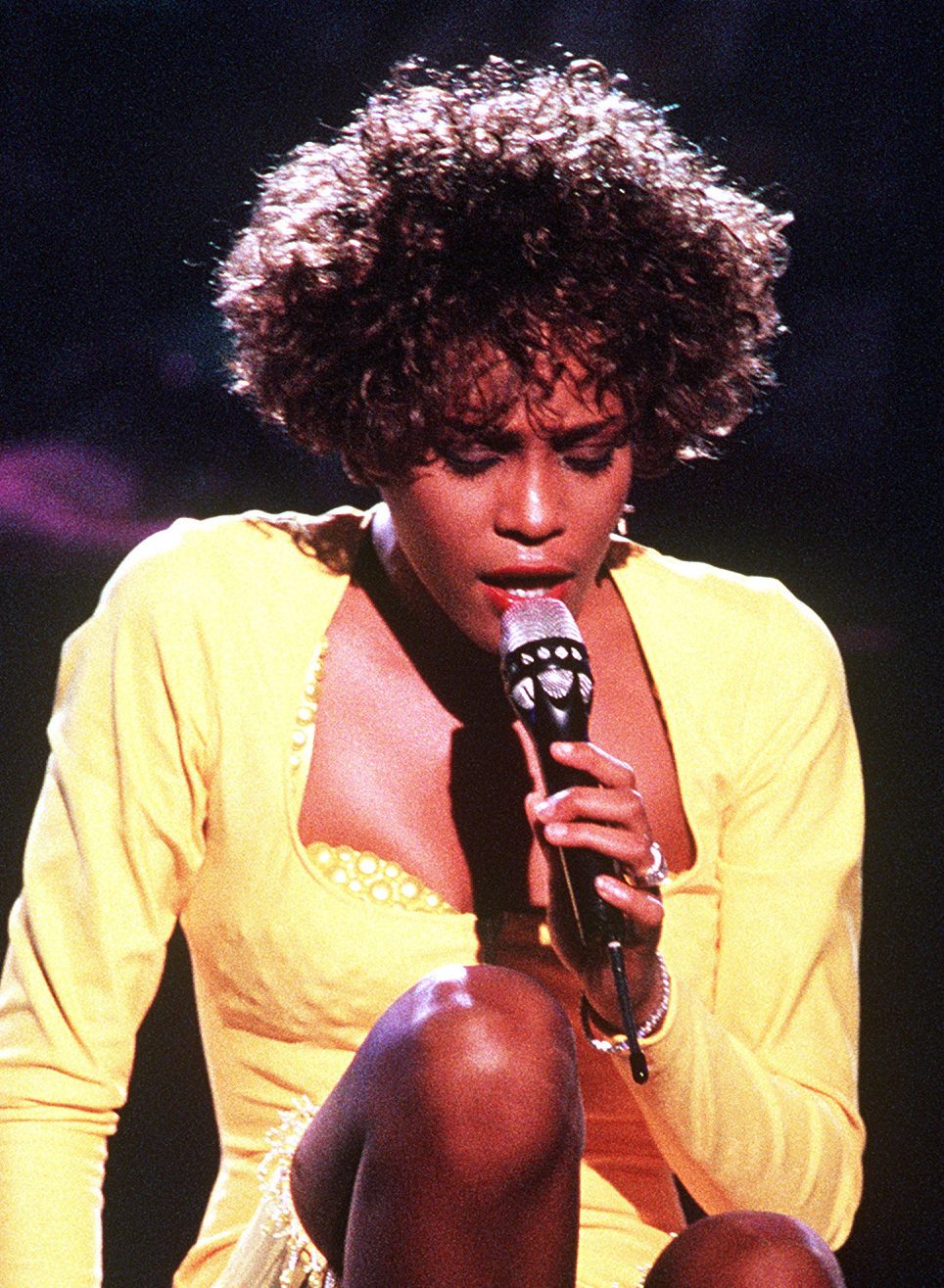
Whitney Houston has six albums on the list (1985–2000).

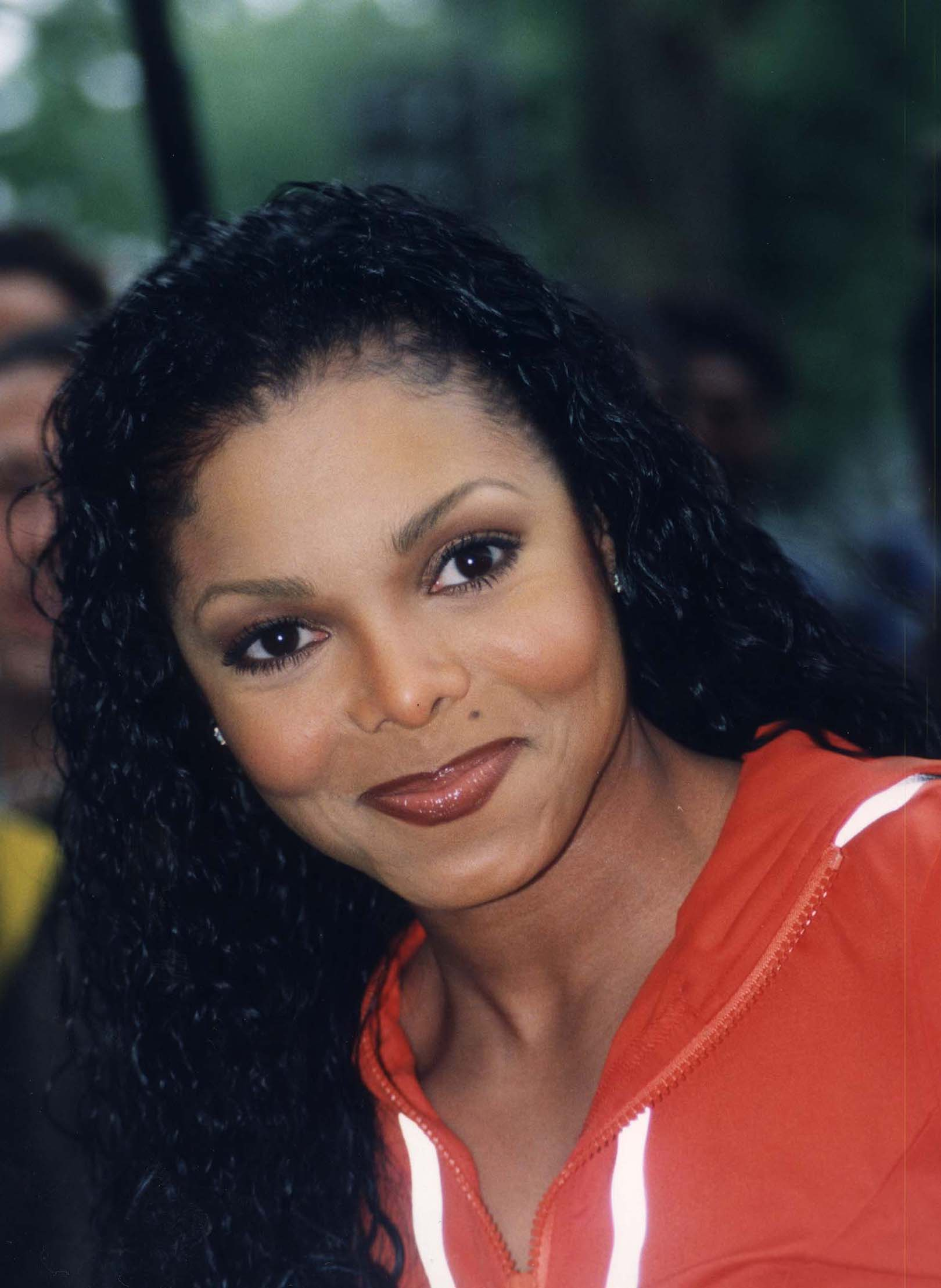
Janet Jackson has three albums on the list (1986–1993).

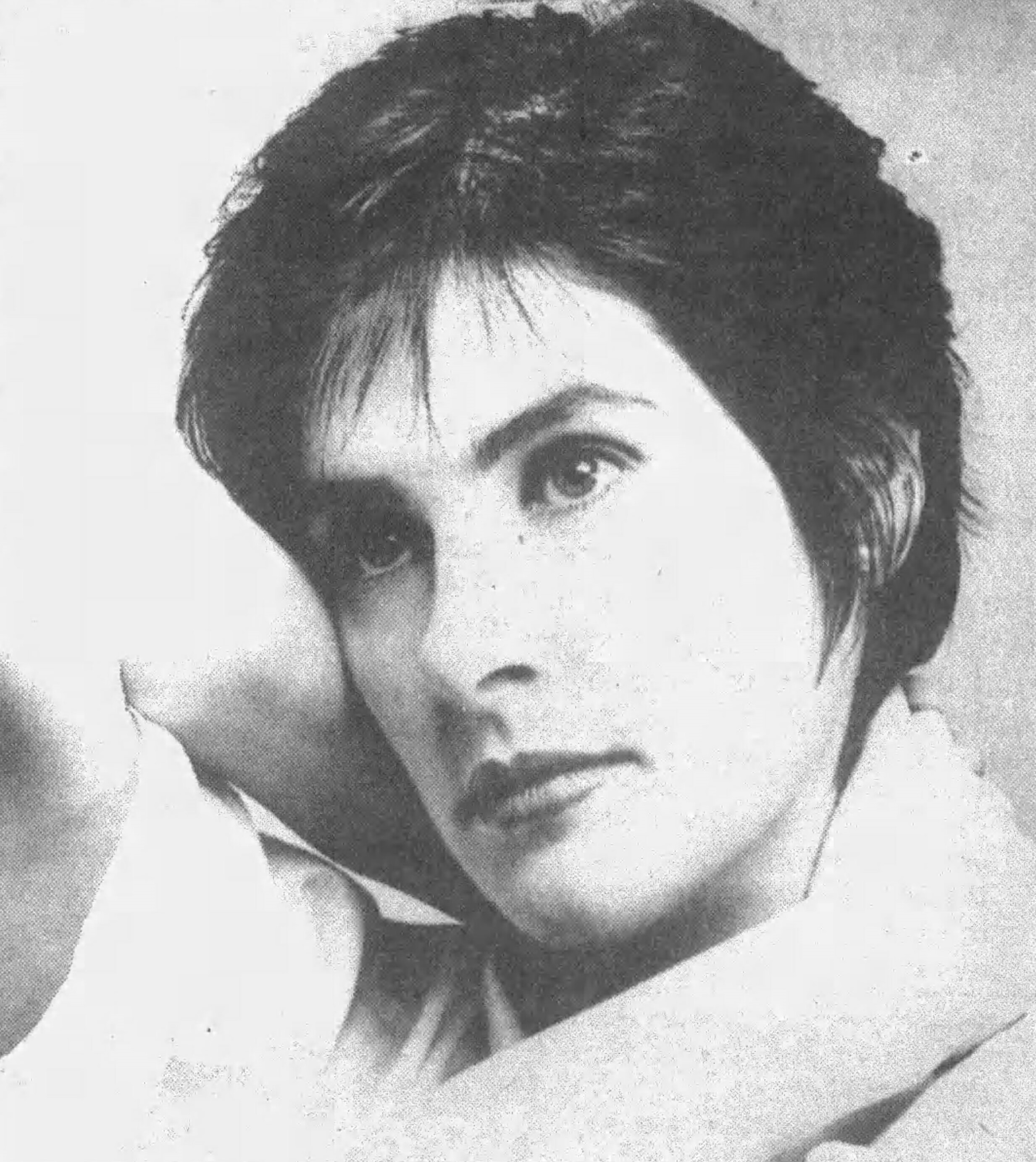
Enya has three albums on the list (1988–2000).

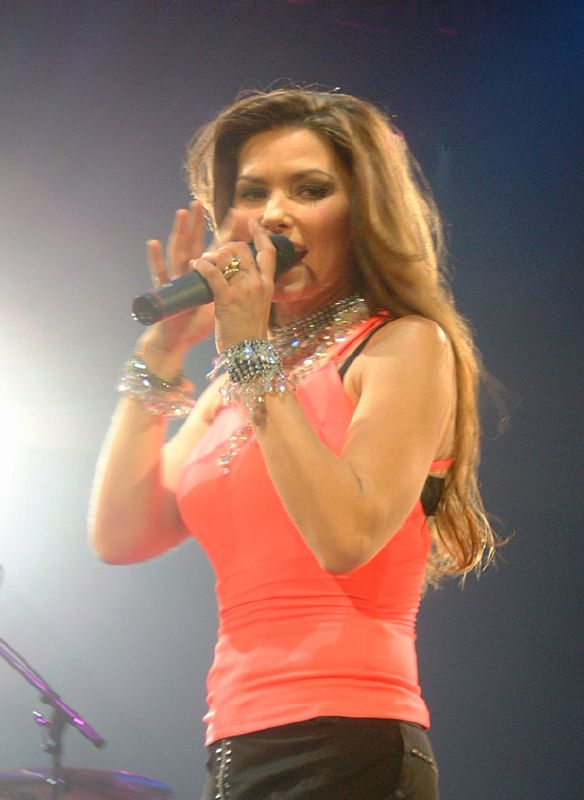
Shania Twain has three albums on the list (1995–2002).

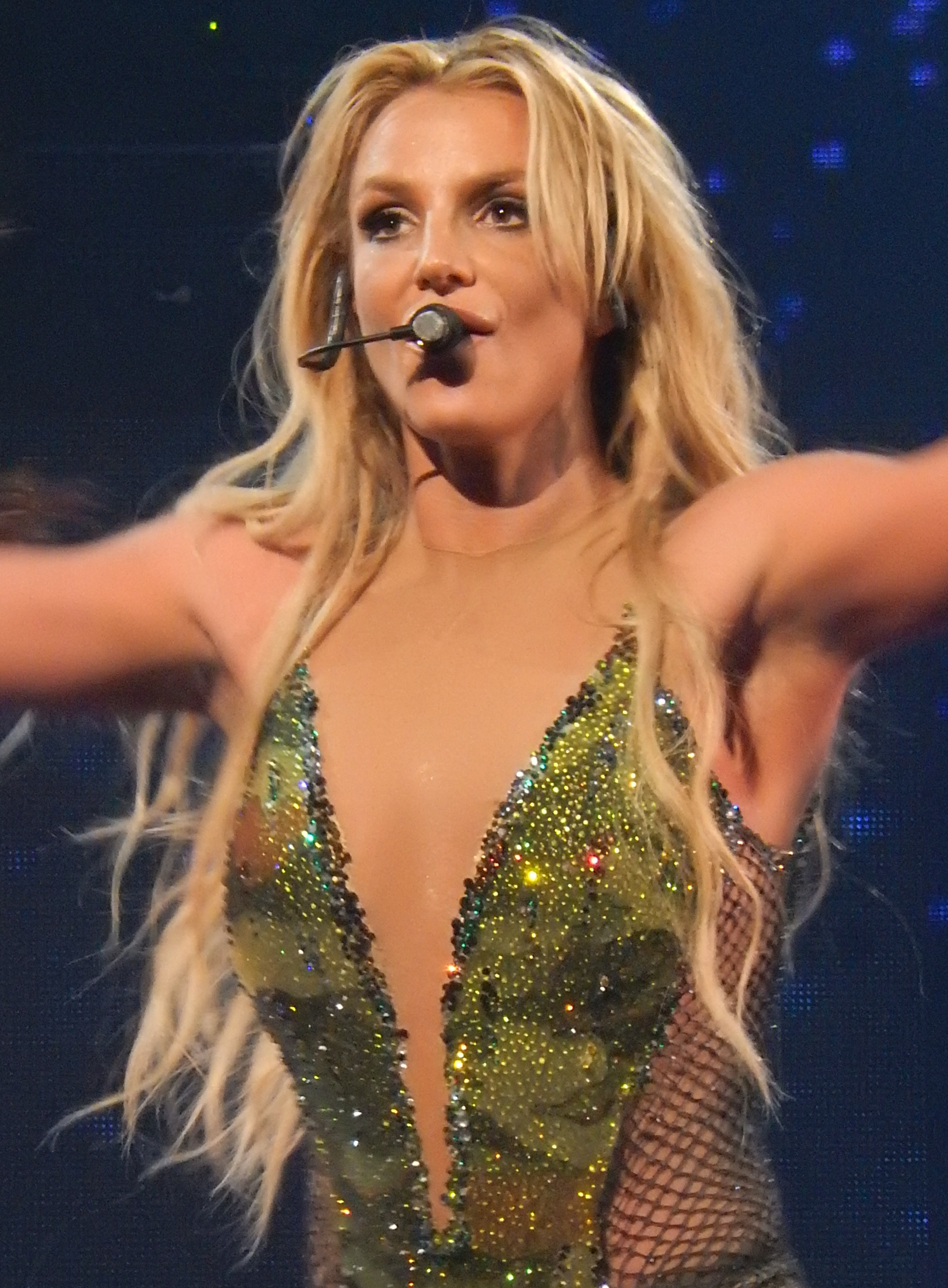
Britney Spears has three albums on the list (1999–2001).

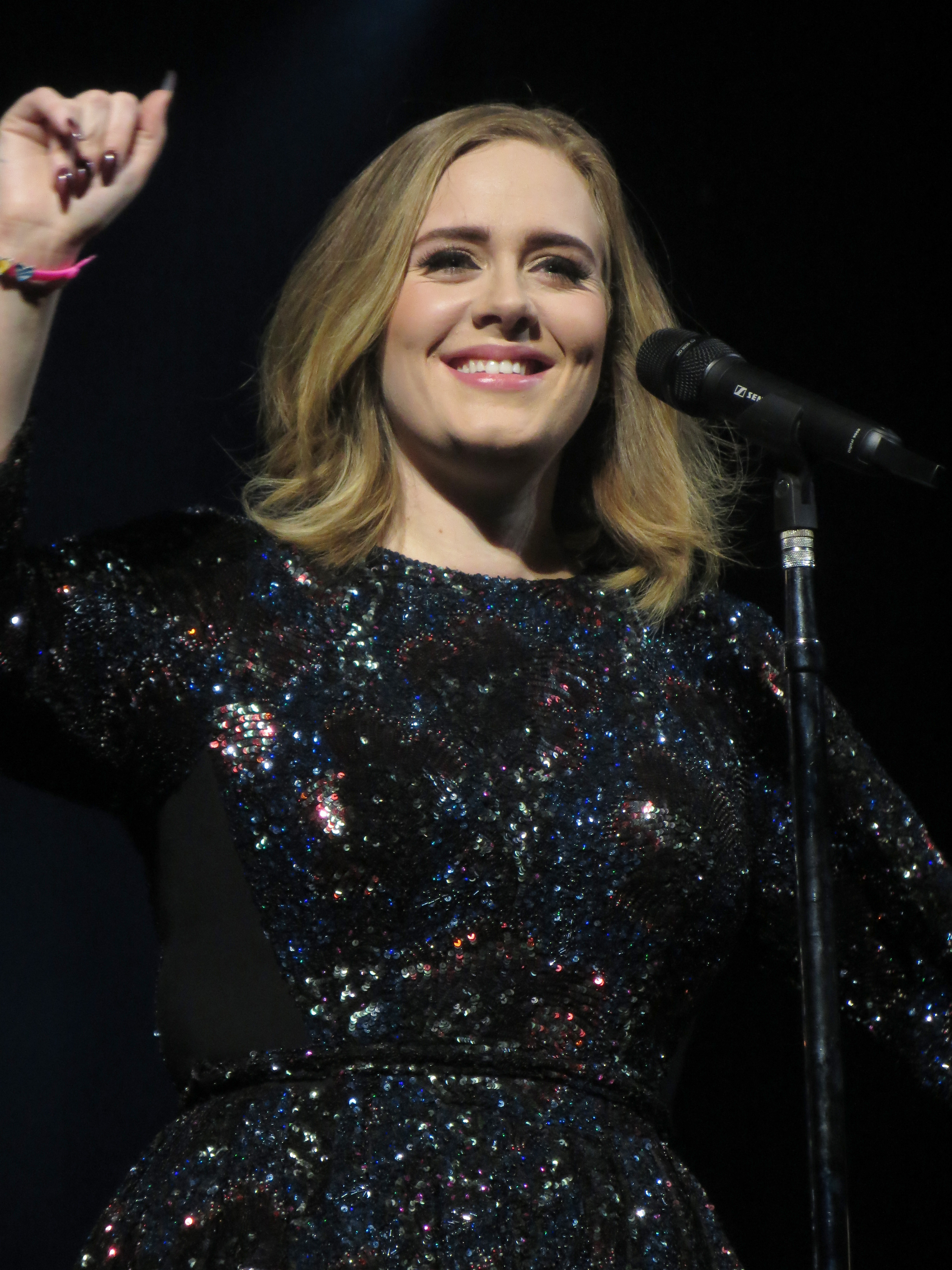
21 by Adele is the best-selling album by a female artist in the 21st-century.

=== 40 million copies or more ===
Artist	Country	Album	Released year	Estimated sales
Whitney Houston / various artists	United States	The Bodyguard	1992	45 million
Shania Twain	Canada	Come On Over	1997	40 million

=== 30 to 39 million copies ===
Artist	Country	Album	Released year	Estimated sales
Alanis Morissette	Canada	Jagged Little Pill	1995	33 million
Celine Dion	Canada	Falling into You	1996	32 million
Celine Dion	Canada	Let's Talk About Love	1997	31 million
Adele	United Kingdom	21	2011	31 million
Madonna	United States	The Immaculate Collection	1990	30 million

=== 20 to 29 million copies ===
Artist	Country	Album	Released year	Estimated sales
Mariah Carey	United States	Music Box	1993	28 million
Norah Jones	United States	Come Away with Me	2002	27 million
Carole King	United States	Tapestry	1971	25 million
Whitney Houston	United States	Whitney Houston	1985	25 million
Madonna	United States	True Blue	1986	25 million
Britney Spears	United States	...Baby One More Time	1999	25 million
Spice Girls	United Kingdom	Spice	1996	23 million
Celine Dion	Canada	All the Way... A Decade of Song	1999	22 million
Adele	United Kingdom	25	2015	22 million
Madonna	United States	Like a Virgin	1984	21 million
Whitney Houston	United States	Whitney	1987	20 million
Tracy Chapman	United States	Tracy Chapman	1988	20 million
Celine Dion	Canada	The Colour of My Love	1993	20 million
Shania Twain	Canada	The Woman in Me	1995	20 million
Mariah Carey	United States	Daydream	1995	20 million
Lauryn Hill	United States	The Miseducation of Lauryn Hill	1998	20 million
Britney Spears	United States	Oops!... I Did It Again	2000	20 million
Amy Winehouse	United Kingdom	Back to Black	2006	20 million

=== 11 to 19 million copies ===
Artist	Country	Album	Released year	Estimated sales
Mariah Carey	United States	Merry Christmas	1994	18 million
Hikaru Utada	Japan	First Love	1999	17.9 million
Cyndi Lauper	United States	She's So Unusual	1983	16 million
Madonna	United States	Ray of Light	1998	16 million
Avril Lavigne	Canada	Let Go	2002	16 million
Dido	United Kingdom	No Angel	1999	15 million
Madonna	United States	Like a Prayer	1989	15 million
Mariah Carey	United States	Mariah Carey	1990	15 million
TLC	United States	CrazySexyCool	1994	15 million
Toni Braxton	United States	Secrets	1996	15 million
Mariah Carey	United States	Number 1's	1998	15 million
Enya	Ireland	A Day Without Rain	2000	15 million
Lady Gaga	United States	The Fame	2008	15 million
Barbra Streisand	United States	Guilty	1980	15 million
Janet Jackson	United States	Janet	1993	14 million
Spice Girls	United Kingdom	Spiceworld	1997	14 million
Christina Aguilera	United States	Christina Aguilera	1999	14 million
Taylor Swift	United States	1989	2014	14 million
Aaliyah	United States	Aaliyah	2001	13 million
Enya	Ireland	Shepherd Moons	1991	13 million
Destiny's Child	United States	The Writing's on the Wall	1999	13 million
Shakira	Colombia	Laundry Service	2001	13 million
Pink	United States	Missundaztood	2001	13 million
Tina Turner	United States	Private Dancer	1984	12 million
Katy Perry	United States	Teenage Dream	2010	12 million
Paula Abdul	United States	Forever Your Girl	1988	12 million
Janet Jackson	United States	Janet Jackson's Rhythm Nation 1814	1989	12 million
Celine Dion	Canada	D'eux	1995	12 million
Jewel	United States	Pieces of You	1995	12 million
Celine Dion	Canada	These Are Special Times	1998	12 million
Alicia Keys	United States	Songs in A Minor	2001	12 million
Celine Dion	Canada	A New Day Has Come	2002	12 million
Christina Aguilera	United States	Stripped	2002	12 million
Dido	United Kingdom	Life for Rent	2003	12 million
Norah Jones	United States	Feels like Home	2004	12 million
Kelly Clarkson	United States	Breakaway	2004	12 million
Taylor Swift	United States	Fearless	2008	12 million
Enya	Ireland	Watermark	1988	11 million
Natalie Cole	United States	Unforgettable... with Love	1991	11 million
Cher	United States	Believe	1998	11 million
Madonna	United States	Music	2000	11 million
Shania Twain	Canada	Up!	2002	11 million
Beyoncé	United States	Dangerously in Love	2003	11 million

=== 10 million copies ===
Artist	Country	Album	Released year	Estimated sales
Barbra Streisand	United States	Memories	1981	10 million
Madonna	United States	Madonna	1983	10 million
Janet Jackson	United States	Control	1986	10 million
Whitney Houston	United States	I'm Your Baby Tonight	1990	10 million
Sheryl Crow	United States	Tuesday Night Music Club	1993	10 million
Toni Braxton	United States	Toni Braxton	1993	10 million
Madonna	United States	Something to Remember	1995	10 million
Mariah Carey	United States	Butterfly	1997	10 million
Whitney Houston	United States	My Love Is Your Love	1998	10 million
TLC	United States	FanMail	1999	10 million
Whitney Houston	United States	Whitney: The Greatest Hits	2000	10 million
Destiny's Child	United States	Survivor	2001	10 million
Britney Spears	United States	Britney	2001	10 million
Avril Lavigne	Canada	Under My Skin	2004	10 million
Mariah Carey	United States	The Emancipation of Mimi	2005	10 million
Madonna	United States	Confessions on a Dance Floor	2005	10 million
Carrie Underwood	United States	Some Hearts	2005	10 million
Nelly Furtado	Canada	Loose	2006	10 million
Beyoncé	United States	I Am... Sasha Fierce	2008	10 million
Susan Boyle	United Kingdom	I Dreamed a Dream	2009	10 million

== See also ==
- List of best-selling albums
- List of best-selling girl group albums
- List of best-selling female rappers
- List of all-female bands
- List of highest-grossing concert tours by women
- Women in music
  - Women in jazz
  - Women in Latin music
  - Women in punk rock
  - Women in rock

== Notes ==
- ^{‡Figure includes on-demand audio and video streams and track sale equivalent}

== Bibliography ==
- Clerk, Carol (2008). Madonna Style. Music Sales Group. ISBN 978-0-85712-218-6.
- Smith, Sean (2019). Spice Girls: The Story of the World's Greatest Girl Band. HarperCollins. ISBN 978-0-00-826756-8.
- Taraborrelli, J. Randy (2002). Madonna: An Intimate Biography. Simon & Schuster. ISBN 978-0-7432-2880-0.
