= Women in jazz =

Women in the history of jazz music

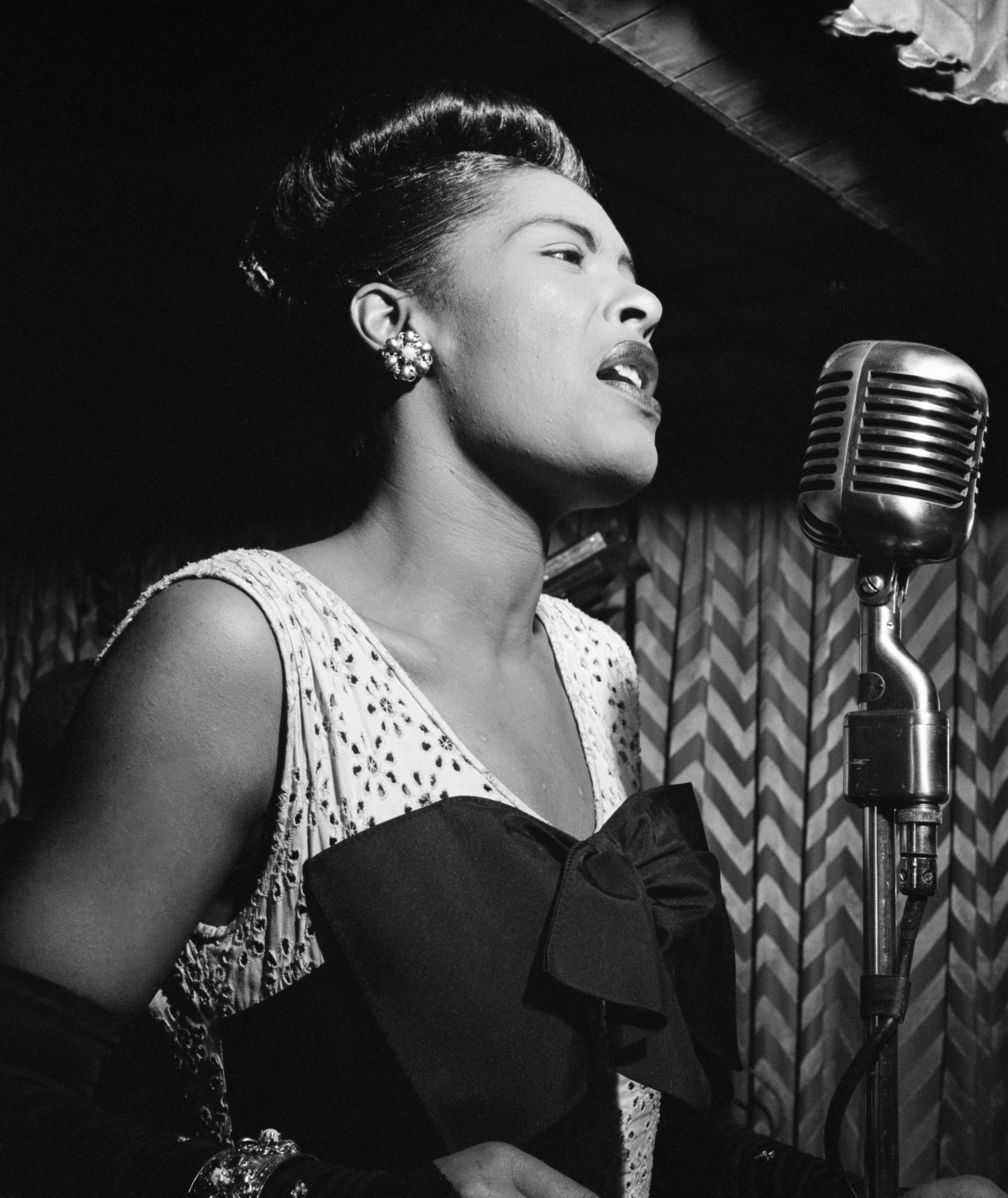
Billie Holiday, 1947

Women in jazz have contributed throughout the many eras of jazz history, both as performers and as composers, songwriters and bandleaders. While women such as Billie Holiday and Ella Fitzgerald were famous for their jazz singing, women have achieved much less recognition for their contributions as composers, bandleaders and instrumental performers. Other notable jazz women include piano player Lil Hardin Armstrong and jazz songwriters Irene Higginbotham and Dorothy Fields.

== History ==
=== United States ===
With women's suffrage at its peak with the ratification of the United States Nineteenth Amendment on 18 August 1920 and the development of the liberated flapper persona, women began to make a statement within society. In the "Jazz Age", women took a greater part in the workforce after the end of the First World War, giving them more independence. In the Jazz Age and during the 1930s, "all-girl" bands such as the Blue Belles, the Parisian Redheads (later the Bricktops), Lil-Hardin's All-Girl Band, the Ingenues, the Harlem Playgirls led by the likes of Neliska Ann Briscoe and Eddie Crump, the International Sweethearts of Rhythm, Phil Spitalny's Musical Sweethearts, "Helen Lewis and Her All-Girl Jazz Syncopators" as well as "Helen Lewis and her Rhythm Queens were popular. There were many more possibilities for women in terms of social life and entertainment. Ideas such as equality and freer sexuality began to spread and women took on new roles. The 1920s saw the emergence of many famous women musicians including African-American blues singer Bessie Smith (1894–1937), who inspired singers from later eras, including Billie Holiday (1915–1959) and Janis Joplin (1943–1970). In the 1920s, women singing jazz music were not many, but women playing instruments in jazz music were even less common. Mary Lou Williams, known for her talent as a piano player, is deemed as one of the "mothers of jazz" due to her singing while playing the piano at the same time.

Lovie Austin (1887–1972) was a piano player and bandleader. Pianist Lil Hardin Armstrong (1898–1971) was originally a member of King Oliver's band with Louis Armstrong and went on to play piano in Armstrong's band the Hot Five and then his next group, the Hot Seven. Valaida Snow (1904–1956) became so famous as a trumpet player that she was known as "Little Louis".

It was not until the 1930s and 1940s that many women jazz singers such as Billie Holiday were recognized as successful artists in the music world. Billie Holiday’s music rose to fame following the Great Depression. She, along with several male artists, added a new flavor to the sounds of jazz that become known as swing music. This music brought in heavier use of a band of instruments as well as many artists then began playing music in addition to already singing. These women were persistent in striving to make their names known in the music industry and lead the way for many more women artists to come.

While jazz songwriting has long been a male-dominated field, there have been a few notable women jazz songwriters. Irene Higginbotham (1918–1988) wrote almost 50 songs, her best-known being "Good Morning Heartache". Ann Ronell (1905–1993) is known for her 1932 hit song "Willow Weep for Me" and the 1933 Disney song "Who's Afraid of the Big Bad Wolf?". Dorothy Fields (1905–1974) wrote the lyrics for more than 400 songs, some of which were played by Duke Ellington. She co-wrote "The Way You Look Tonight" with Jerome Kern, which won the 1936 Oscar for Best Song. She also co-wrote several jazz standards with Jimmy McHugh, including "Exactly Like You", "On the Sunny Side of the Street" and "I Can't Give You Anything but Love, Baby".

Lil Hardin Armstrong's most famous song, "Struttin' with Some Barbecue", has been recorded 500 times. Her other notable songs are “Doin' the Suzie Q", "Just for a Thrill" and "Bad Boy". While Billie Holiday is best known as a singer, she co-wrote "God Bless the Child" and "Don't Explain" with Arthur Herzog, Jr. and she penned the blues song "Fine and Mellow".

=== South Africa ===
Besides earlier singers such as Miriam Makeba or Dorothy Masuka, women in contemporary South African jazz include trombone player Siya Makuzeni, pianist and vocalist Thandi Ntuli, or pianists Lindi Ngonelo and Lindi Ngonelo.

== Activism ==
Within the early industry of jazz, possessing masculinity was viewed as a preference that made women in jazz struggle for recognition. Many musicians began taking the discussion of inequality from the musical aspect and applying those same concepts to becoming activists. Several women in jazz were activists either for gender equality or racial equality and often both. Once jazz music transitioned from the 1920s to the 1950s, many black female artists began singing more in the style of R&B blues as well as folk jazz.

Nina Simone was hailed as setting a prominent precedent for other artists, as she modeled what was called the new style of jazz. Her style was also around the time of the popular Civil Rights Movement that peaked in the late 1950s and continued through the '60s. In 1964, Simone performed at Carnegie Hall in front of an all-white audience. One of the songs she chose to sing was "Mississippi Goddam", which expounded on the racial injustice of blacks living in Mississippi, Alabama, and Tennessee. Although it was an all-white audience, many of those listening responded with interest and concern rather than criticism, which added another layer to the culture of jazz within the civil rights era. Jazz became a unifying concept among contrasting races and cultures and Simone’s popular anthems continued to be a product of the issues surrounding the Civil Rights Movement and the injustices that were displayed.

Billie Holiday was another prominent female jazz singer who provided an effective notion to the Civil Rights Movement in her song "Strange Fruit". Through an emotional and metaphorical narration, Holiday's song depicts the vision and harsh reality of blacks being lynched as a result of racism. Holiday performed the song nearly every night she went on stage, thus shaping the song to become a popular melody. This melody slowly began to be associated heavily with civil rights protests and was often used by well-known activists such as Malcolm X.

== List of notable women in jazz ==
Historically, women performers in jazz have been mostly singers, among them Ella Fitzgerald (1917–1996), Billie Holiday (1915–1959) Bessie Smith (1894–1937), Carmen McRae (1920–1994), Dinah Washington (1924–1963), Sarah Vaughan (1924–1990), Betty Carter (1929–1998), Anita O'Day (1919–2006), Abbey Lincoln (1930–2010), Nancy Wilson (1937–2018), Diane Schuur (born 1953), Diana Krall (born 1964), Gretchen Parlato (born 1976), and Gabrielle Goodman (born 1964). However, there are many notable instrumental performers. In some cases, these musicians are also composers and bandleaders:

- Beegie Adair (piano, arranger and composer)
- Toshiko Akiyoshi (piano, composer, and bandleader)
- Melissa Aldana (tenor saxophone, and bandleader)
- Geri Allen (piano, composer, and bandleader)
- Lil Hardin Armstrong (piano, composer, arranger, and bandleader)
- Lynne Arriale (piano, composer, and bandleader)
- Dorothy Ashby (harp, composer, and bandleader)
- Lovie Austin (piano and bandleader)
- Judy Bailey (piano, composer, bandleader)
- Sweet Emma Barrett (piano)
- Carla Bley (piano, composer, and bandleader)
- Jane Ira Bloom (soprano saxophone, composer, and bandleader)
- Joanne Brackeen (piano, composer)
- Jane Bunnett (saxophone, flute, piano, and bandleader)
- Judy Carmichael (piano, bandleader, and vocalist)
- Terri Lyne Carrington (drums)
- Barbara Carroll (piano, bandleader)
- Regina Carter (jazz violin)
- Anat Cohen (clarinet, tenor and soprano saxophones, and bandleader)
- Alice Coltrane (harp, composer, and bandleader)
- Roxy Coss (saxophone, flute)
- Blossom Dearie (piano, vocalist, and bandleader)
- Dena DeRose (piano, vocalist)
- Dorothy Donegan (piano, vocalist)
- Eliane Elias (piano, vocalist, composer, arranger)
- Mimi Fox (guitar, and bandleader)
- Champian Fulton (piano, vocalist, composer, and bandleader)
- Scheila Gonzalez (saxophones, woodwinds)
- Mary Halvorson (guitar, and bandleader)
- Jutta Hipp (piano)
- Shirley Horn (piano, vocalist)
- Bobbi Humphrey (flute)
- Margie Hyams (piano, and vibraphone)
- Ingrid Jensen (trumpet)
- Dolly Jones (trumpet)
- Yoko Kanno (composer, arranger, and bandleader)
- Andrea Keller (piano, composer)
- Grace Kelly (saxophone)
- Joelle Khoury (piano and composer)
- Jeanette Kimball (piano)
- Kristin Korb (bass, vocalist, bandleader, and composer)
- Diana Krall (piano, vocalist, and bandleader)
- Katia Labeque (piano)
- Melba Liston (trombone, arranger, composer, and bandleader)
- Marilyn Mazur (drums, percussion)
- Marian McPartland (piano, composer, and bandleader)
- Myra Melford (piano, composer, and bandleader)
- Amina Claudine Myers (piano, organ, and composer)
- Linda Oh (bass, composer, and bandleader)
- Mary Osborne (guitar, and bandleader)
- Nicki Parrott (bass, vocalist, and bandleader)
- Ann Patterson (saxophones, woodwinds)
- Billie Pierce (piano)
- Terry Pollard (piano, vibraphone, and bandleader)
- Vi Redd (alto saxophone, and bandleader)
- Emily Remler (guitar, and bandleader)
- Renee Rosnes (piano, composer, arranger, and bandleader)
- Stacy Rowles (trumpet)
- Patrice Rushen (piano, composer, arranger, and bandleader)
- Gaea Schell (piano, flute, composer)
- Maria Schneider (composer, arranger, and bandleader)
- Hazel Scott (classical piano, singer, and actor)
- Nina Simone (piano, vocalist, and bandleader)
- Esperanza Spalding (bassist, vocalist, and composer)
- Riyoko Takagi (piano, composer, and bandleader)
- Barbara Thompson (saxophonist, flutist and composer)
- Hiromi Uehara (piano, composer, and bandleader)
- Mary Lou Williams (piano, arranger, bandleader, composer)

There have also been all-female jazz bands, such as The International Sweethearts of Rhythm.

== Factors contributing to lower participation and recognition ==
=== Association with jazz singing and lesser musicianship ===
According to Jessica Duchen, a music writer for London newspaper The Independent, women musicians are "too often judged for their appearances, rather than their talent", and they face pressure "to look sexy onstage and in photos." Duchen states that while "[t]here are women musicians who refuse to play on their looks,... the ones who do tend to be more materially successful." According to the UK's BBC Radio 3 editor, Edwina Wolstencroft, the music industry has long been open to having women in performance or entertainment roles, but women are much less likely to have positions of authority, such as being a bandleader. In popular music, while there are many women singers recording songs, there are very few women behind the audio console acting as music producers, the individuals who direct and manage the recording process.

=== History of women's marginalised representation in jazz ===
"Only a few of the many women [songwriters] in America had their music published and heard during the late 19th and early 20th centuries." According to Richard A. Reublin and Richard G. Beil, the "lack of mention of women [songwriters] is a glaring and embarrassing omission in our musical heritage." Women "struggled to write and publish music in the man's world of 20th-century Tin Pan Alley. Prior to 1900 and even after 1900, it was expected that "women would perform music, not make music." In 1880, Chicago music critic George P. Upton wrote Women In Music, in which he argued that "women lacked the innate creativity to compose good music" due to "biological predisposition".

Later, it was accepted that women would have a role in music education, and they became involved in this field "to such a degree that women dominated music education during the latter half of the 19th century and well into the 20th century." The "secular music in print in America before 1825 shows only about 70 works by women." In the mid-19th century, notable women songwriters emerged, including Faustina Hasse Hodges, Susan McFarland Parkhurst, Augusta Browne and Marion Dix Sullivan. By 1900, there were many more women songwriters, but "many were still forced to use pseudonyms or initials" to hide the fact that they were women.

However, in recent times, women have employed jazz music also for creating movements and awareness about sexism and misogyny within the jazz industry. A group of women called the "We Have a Voice Collective" aims to bring attention and appreciation for the women associated with jazz music past and present.

== See also ==
- Women in music
