= Piano Jazz =

US public radio show on NPR

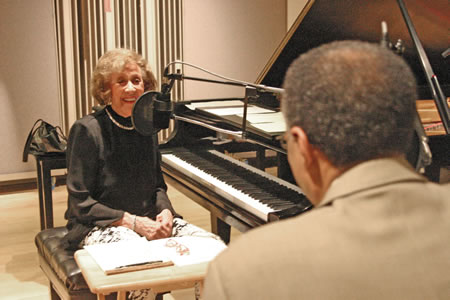
- Marian McPartland interviews Ramsey Lewis on Piano Jazz in 2009.
- Home station: South Carolina Public Radio
- Syndicates: National Public Radio
- Hosted by: Marian McPartland
- Original release: June 4, 1978 – 2011
- Website: www.npr.org

Piano Jazz is a weekly one-hour radio show produced and distributed by National Public Radio (NPR). It began on June 4, 1978, and was hosted by jazz pianist Marian McPartland (1918–2013) until 2011. It is the longest-running cultural program on NPR. The show generally features a single guest (though small groups and duos are also featured at times), and usually consists of about an equal mixture of discussion and playing, often duets with McPartland. Initially the guests were limited to jazz pianists, but the format was later expanded to include performers on other instruments as well as other genres (though the performances remain focused on jazz tunes). The show provides an inside look at the relationships of jazz musicians, since McPartland often had long friendships with many of her guests. Piano Jazz won a Peabody Award in 1983. The show is an exclusive production of South Carolina public radio on WLTR and is offered nationally by NPR.

A number of shows have been released commercially on CD or LP, including shows with Dizzy Gillespie, Bill Evans, Bruce Hornsby, Mary Lou Williams, Shirley Horn, Steely Dan Milt Hinton, Kenny Burrell, Lionel Hampton and Les McCann. These were released on The Jazz Alliance, a subsidiary of Concord Records founded around 1990 for this purpose.

On November 10, 2011, NPR announced the retirement of Marian McPartland from the program. Jon Weber stepped into McPartland's shoes, recording 13 episodes for the renamed Piano Jazz Rising Stars, broadcast in early 2012 and 2013. It features mainly young musicians such as Whitney James, Jason Moran, Taylor Eigsti and Grace Kelly. McPartland's Piano Jazz continues as a series of rebroadcasts of old programs, with Piano Jazz Rising Stars becoming a separate program.

== Program log: guest list ==
(This is a list of recording dates in year-month-day format for the sessions listed; when the exact date is unknown, 00 is used as a placeholder)

=== 1970s ===
- 1978-10-08 Mary Lou Williams
- 1978-10-09 Billy Taylor
- 1978-10-29 Bobby Short
- 1978-11-05 Ellis Larkins
- 1978-11-06 Bill Evans
- 1978-11-06 Oscar Peterson
- 1978-00-00 Barbara Carroll
- 1979-11-26 Hazel Scott
- 1979-12-15 Eubie Blake
- 1979-12-12 Jay McShann
- 1979-00-00 Dick Hyman
- 1979-00-00 John Lewis
- 1979-00-00 Teddy Wilson
- 1979-00-00 Tommy Flanagan
- 1979-00-00 Dave McKenna

=== 1980s ===
- 1980-00-00 Joanne Brackeen
- 1980-00-00 Roy Kral
- 1980-00-00 Patti Bown
- 1980-00-00 Cedar Walton
- 1980-00-00 George Shearing
- 1980-00-00 Hank Jones
- 1980-00-00 Duke Jordan
- 1980-00-00 Barry Harris
- 1980-00-00 Sir Roland Hanna
- 1980-00-00 Ramsey Lewis
- 1980-00-00 Cy Coleman
- 1980-00-00 Johnny Guarnieri
- 1980-06-02 Oscar Peterson
- 1981-06-26 Stanley Cowell
- 1981-08-28 Randy Weston
- 1981-08-29 Ray Bryant
- 1981-11-30 Norma Teagarden
- 1981-12-01 Jess Stacy
- 1981-12-04 Alice Coltrane
- 1981-00-00 Dick Wellstood
- 1982-00-00 Jimmy Rowles
- 1982-00-00 Dudley Moore
- 1982-00-00 Joe Bushkin
- 1983-05-04 McCoy Tyner
- 1983-05-05 Marie Marcus
- 1983-05-00 Dorothy Donegan
- 1983-05-31 Monty Alexander
- 1983-00-00 Ross Tompkins
- 1983-00-00 Albert Dailey
- 1984-03-23 Dave Brubeck
- 1984-00-00 Joyce Collins
- 1984-00-00 Art Hodes
- 1984-00-00 Richard Rodney Bennett
- 1984-00-00 George Wein
- 1984-00-00 Roger Williams
- 1984-00-00 Joanne Grauer
- 1984-00-00 Peter Nero
- 1984-00-00 Steve Kuhn
- 1984-00-00 Makoto Ozone
- 1984-00-00 Dardanelle Hadley
- 1984-00-00 James Williams
- 1985-01-29 Dizzy Gillespie
- 1985-03-11 Carmen McRae
- 1985-03-14 Henry Mancini
- 1985-00-00 Ahmad Jamal
- 1985-00-00 Blossom Dearie
- 1986-01-17 Sarah Vaughan
- 1986-08-18 Roy Eldridge
- 1986-08-21 Michel Petrucciani first broadcast 1987-01-22
- 1986-11-10 Bobby Short
- 1985-00-00 Bill Dobbins
- 1986-00-00 Walter Bishop
- 1986-00-00 Paul Smith
- 1986-00-00 Cecil Taylor
- 1986-00-00 Mel Torme
- 1986-00-00 Pete Jolly
- 1986-00-00 Sammy Price
- 1987-01-03 Herbie Hancock
- 1987-01-27 Chick Corea
- 1987-11-00 Sharon Freeman
- 1987-00-00 Gerry Mulligan
- 1987-00-00 Sharon Freeman
- 1987-00-00 George Shearing
- 1987-00-00 Phineas Newborn
- 1988-00-00 Mose Allison
- 1988-01-13 Nadine Jansen
- 1988-01-19 Johnny Costa
- 1989-01-11 Lionel Hampton
- 1989-01-19 Dr. John
- 1989-02-20 Benny Carter
- 1989-07-11 Shirley Horn
- 1989-07-14 Pat Moran McCoy
- 1989-09-27 Les McCann
- 1989-10-05 Stéphane Grappelli
- 1989-00-00 Tommy Flanagan
- 1989-00-00 John Lewis

=== 1990s ===
- 1990-01-09 Ray Charles
- 1990-01-30 Barbara Carroll
- 1990-03-24 John Hicks
- 1990-04-00 Cy Coleman
- 1990-12-07 Dick Hyman
- 1991-00-00 Milt Jackson
- 1991-02-02 Hickory House Trio
- 1991-02-20 John Bunch
- 1991-08-15 Milt Hinton
- 1991-08-29 Amina Claudine Myers
- 1991-09-06 Lee Konitz
- 1991-10-14 Rosemary Clooney
- 1991-10-16 Red Richards
- 1991-11-13 Joe Williams
- 1992-00-00 Jessica Williams
- 1992-01-21 Mel Torme first broadcast 1992-05-09
- 1992-01-24 Gerald Wiggins
- 1992-12-11 Jack DeJohnette
- 1992-00-00 Shirley Scott
- 1992-00-00 George Shearing
- 1993-02-12 Eartha Kitt first broadcast 1993-04-10
- 1993-04-15 Kenny Burrell
- 1993-08-03 Nancy Wilson
- 1993-09-21 Clark Terry
- 1994-00-00 Stanley Cowell
- 1994-00-00 Susannah McCorkle
- 1994-00-00 Jaki Byard
- 1994-00-00 Claude Bolling
- 1994-00-00 Nat Hentoff
- 1994-00-00 Clint Eastwood
- 1994-00-00 Terence Blanchard
- 1994-00-00 Tania Maria
- 1994-01-24 Mercer Ellington
- 1994-01-29 George Duke
- 1994-04-24 Diana Krall
- 1994-05-19 Dave McKenna
- 1995-01-06 Helen Merrill
- 1995-01-00 Paquito D'Rivera
- 1995-03-07 Charles Brown
- 1995-07-28 Bela Fleck
- 1995-08-15 Carla Bley & Steve Swallow
- 1995-10-09 Roy Haynes
- 1995-00-00 Dave Brubeck
- 1995-00-00 Joe Locke
- 1995-00-00 Ray Brown
- 1996-08-22 Michael Weiss
- 1996-08-00 Brad Mehldau
- 1996-00-00 Joe Locke
- 1996-00-00 Sarah Vaughan
- 1997-00-00 Lalo Schifrin
- 1997-01-08 James Moody
- 1997-01-31 Eddie Palmieri
- 1997-09-09 Karrin Allyson
- 1997-11-02 John Dankworth, Cleo Laine
- 1997-11-09 Oscar Peterson first broadcast 1998-04-04
- 1997-00-00 Lyle Mays
- 1997-00-00 Tommy Flanagan
- 1997-00-00 Barry Harris
- 1998-04-21 Max Roach
- 1998-00-00 David Sanchez
- 1998-00-00 Marilyn Crispell
- 1998-00-00 Gene Harris
- 1998-00-00 Regina Carter
- 1998-00-00 Onaje Allan Gumbs
- 1998-00-00 Michel Legrand
- 1998-00-00 Roy Hargrove
- 1998-00-00 Mark Murphy
- 1998-11-19 Dianne Reeves
- 1999-00-00 Don Byron
- 1999-01-28 Les Paul first broadcast 1999-06-01
- 1999-07-26 Howard Alden
- 1999-11-16 Chuck Mangione
- 1999-00-00 Denny Zeitlin
- 1999-00-00 Harry "Sweets" Edison

=== 2000s ===
- 2000-00-00 Paul Bley
- 2000-06-00 Nicholas Payton
- 2000-07-24 John Frigo
- 2000-10-17 Jimmy Heath
- 2000-10-18 Joe Wilder
- 2000-11-15 Stacy Rowles
- 2000-11-16 Kevin Eubanks
- 2001-00-00 Jackie Cain
- 2001-00-00 Russell Malone
- 2001-03-24 Jim Cullum, Jr.
- 2001-05-00 Christian McBride
- 2001-07-23 Willie Nelson
- 2001-10-22 Jason Moran
- 2001-12-10 Chick Corea
- 2002-00-00 Arturo O'Farrill
- 2002-00-00 Barbara Lea
- 2002-00-00 Benny Green
- 2002-00-00 Carol Sloane
- 2002-00-00 Clare Fischer (possible rebroadcast of session recorded for the 1983 season rather than 2002)
- 2002-00-00 Cyrus Chestnut
- 2002-00-00 Dee Dee Bridgewater first broadcast 2003-11-11
- 2002-00-00 Joyce Collins possible rebroadcast of session recorded for the 1983 season rather than 2002
- 2002-00-00 Sir Roland Hanna possible rebroadcast of session recorded for the 1980 season
- 2002-00-00 Stefon Harris
- 2002-01-00 Artie Shaw
- 2002-01-14 Kurt Elling
- 2002-07-23 Steely Dan
- 2002-07-25 Phil Woods
- 2002-09-09 Mulgrew Miller
- 2003-00-00 Jon Faddis first broadcast 2004
- 2003-02-19 Jacky Terrasson
- 2003-03-20 Chuck Leavell
- 2003-05-00 Sue Mingus Boris Kozlov
- 2003-05-06 Elvis Costello
- 2003-06-16 Kenny Barron
- 2003-06-19 Bruce Hornsby
- 2003-07-07 John Medeski
- 2003-08-30 Norah Jones
- 2003-09-08 Orrin Evans
- 2003-09-11 Alicia Keys
- 2003-10-16 Jane Monheit
- 2003-12-03 Jim Hall
- 2003-12-30 Regina Carter
- 2004-00-00 Taylor Eigsti
- 2004-00-00 Tony Bennett
- 2004-02-16 Frank Morgan
- 2004-02-17 Hiromi Uehara
- 2004-03-00 Steve Kuhn possible rebroadcast of session recorded for the 1983 season since set list doesn't match 2005-03-15 broadcast
- 2004-03-09 Ralph Sutton
- 2004-04-00 Bill Kirchner
- 2004-04-00 Lee Musiker first broadcast 2005-01-25
- 2004-04-19 Gary Burton first broadcast 2005-01-04
- 2004-06-21 Loren Schoenberg first broadcast 2005-03-29
- 2004-06-24 Toots Thielemans first broadcast 2005-03-08
- 2004-07-00 Jodie Christian first broadcast 2005-02-15
- 2004-07-00 Noah Baerman first broadcast 2005-03-01
- 2004-07-00 Ramsey Lewis first broadcast 2005-02-01
- 2004-07-15 Jon Weber first broadcast 2005-02-08
- 2004-10-00 Dave Peck
- 2004-10-00 Eric Mintel
- 2004-10-12 Ann Hampton Callaway
- 2004-12-00 Earma Thompson
- 2005-02-24 Andrew Hill
- 2005-04-28 Benny Golson
- 2005-06-22 Dena DeRose
- 2005-08-08 Freddie Redd
- 2005-08-15 Joanne Brackeen
- 2005-08-18 Daniela Schaechter
- 2005-09-20 John Harmon
- 2005-11-01 Pat Metheny
- 2005-11-04 Burt Bacharach first broadcast 2005-04-05 !?!
- 2005-12-08 Julian Lage
- 2006-00-00 Diana Krall
- 2006-00-00 Gerald Wilson
- 2006-00-00 Russ Kassoff
- 2006-01-17 Mimi Fox
- 2006-02-06 Stefano Bollani
- 2006-02-09 Marty Ashby
- 2006-03-06 Melissa Walker
- 2006-03-07 Matthew Shipp
- 2006-03-15 Roger Kellaway
- 2006-04-11 Billy Childs
- 2006-04-12 Michel Camilo
- 2006-05-16 Eddie Gómez
- 2006-05-18 Robin Meloy Goldsby
- 2006-06-11 Bud Shank
- 2006-06-20 Ron Carter
- 2006-07-19 John Stetch
- 2006-08-08 Helen Sung
- 2006-09-03 Elvis Costello
- 2006-09-08 Keith Jarrett
- 2006-10-16 John Proulx
- 2006-10-17 Janis Siegel with Gil Goldstein
- 2006-11-14 Julian Waterfall Pollack
- 2006-11-16 Bill Frisell
- 2006-12-06 Aaron Diehl
- 2007-00-00 Amina Figarova
- 2007-00-00 Anat Cohen
- 2007-00-00 Charlie Watts & Tim Ries
- 2007-00-00 Ellen Seeling
- 2007-00-00 Matt Savage
- 2007-00-00 Veronica Nunn
- 2007-01-19 Steve Kuhn
- 2007-02-05 Michael Kocour
- 2007-02-08 Kenny Werner
- 2007-03-04 Billy Taylor
- 2007-04-06 Elvis Costello
- 2007-04-10 Betty Buckley
- 2007-04-11 Anat Fort
- 2007-04-20 Janis Siegel
- 2007-04-26 Jay McShann
- 2007-05-10 Tammy Hall
- 2007-06-19 Jimmy McPartland
- 2007-06-21 Tierney Sutton
- 2007-06-25 Larry Willis
- 2007-06-28 Tony DeSare
- 2007-07-11 Ray Charles
- 2007-07-17 Elizabeth Doyle
- 2007-07-17 Jeremy Monteiro
- 2007-07-27 Bud Shank
- 2007-08-03 Eddie Palmieri
- 2007-08-07 Bobby Broom
- 2007-08-24 Jimmy McPartland
- 2007-08-31 Charlie Watts
- 2007-09-01 Renee Rosnes
- 2007-09-14 Ellen Seeling
- 2007-09-17 Warren Vache
- 2007-09-19 Laurence Hobgood
- 2007-09-28 Loren Schoenberg
- 2007-10-12 Nellie Lutcher
- 2007-10-17 Larry Vuckovich
- 2007-10-19 Bill Frisell
- 2007-10-26 Betty Buckley
- 2007-11-02 Robert Glasper
- 2007-11-09 Anat Fort
- 2007-11-16 Michael Coker
- 2007-11-23 Stefano Bollani
- 2007-11-30 Dena DeRose
- 2007-12-07 Kenny Werner
- 2007-12-13 Christmas Jazz
- 2007-12-21 Andrew Hill
- 2007-12-28 Matt Savage
- 2008-01-11 Larry Willis
- 2008-01-17 Johnny Frigo
- 2008-01-25 Amina Figarova
- 2008-01-30 Rebecca Parris
- 2008-02-01 Tony DeSare
- 2008-02-15 Steve Kuhn
- 2008-02-22 Max Roach
- 2008-02-29 Tammy Hall
- 2008-03-07 Jeremy Monteiro
- 2008-03-14 Benny Golson
- 2008-03-19 Marian McPartland Birthday Set
- 2008-03-21 Jimmy McPartland
- 2008-03-28 Toots Thielemans
- 2008-04-04 Renee Rosnes
- 2008-04-11 Lionel Hampton
- 2008-04-15 Tardo Hammer
- 2008-04-17 Grace Kelly
- 2008-04-18 Chuck Leavell
- 2008-04-25 Bobby Broom
- 2008-05-02 Veronica Nunn
- 2008-05-05 Paul Winter
- 2008-05-07 Sam Reider
- 2008-05-09 Larry Vuckovich
- 2008-05-23 Laurence Hobgood
- 2008-05-30 Frank Morgan
- 2008-06-03 Geri Allen
- 2008-06-05 Eliane Elias
- 2008-06-06 Elizabeth Doyle
- 2008-06-13 Joe Wilder
- 2008-06-20 Warren Vache
- 2008-06-27 Stephane Grapelli
- 2008-07-04 Bill Evans
- 2008-07-11 Ray Charles
- 2008-07-14 Bill Charlap & Renee Rosnes
- 2008-07-16 Ed Reed
- 2008-08-01 Diana Krall
- 2008-08-04 Kate McGarry
- 2008-08-06 John Pizzarelli
- 2008-08-14 Herbie Hancock
- 2008-08-22 Norah Jones
- 2008-08-29 Ahmad Jamal
- 2008-08-30 Mulgrew Miller, Spencer Day, Nnenna Freelon
- 2008-09-05 Tony Bennett
- 2008-09-10 Hod O'Brien
- 2008-09-18 Daryl Sherman
- 2008-09-19 Henry Mancini
- 2008-09-26 Chick Corea
- 2008-10-03 Nancy Wilson
- 2008-10-10 Piano Jazz 90th birthday
- 2008-10-20 Jesse Green
- 2008-10-22 Chris Ziemba
- 2008-10-24 Eliane Elias
- 2008-10-31 Ron Carter
- 2008-11-07 Studs Terkel
- 2008-11-11 Esperanza Spalding
- 2008-11-21 Mimi Fox
- 2008-11-28 Geri Allen
- 2008-12-02 Dick Hyman
- 2008-12-05 Grace Kelly
- 2008-12-12 Sam Ryder
- 2008-12-19 Rebecca Parris
- 2009-00-00 Beegie Adair
- 2009-00-00 Cedar Walton
- 2009-00-00 Dave Samuels
- 2009-00-00 Hank Jones
- 2009-00-00 Marian Petrescu
- 2009-00-00 Randy Brecker
- 2009-00-00 Sheila Jordan
- 2009-01-07 Grady Tate
- 2009-01-09 Sherrie Maricle
- 2009-01-16 Ed Reed
- 2009-02-06 Michel Camilo
- 2009-02-27 Billy Childs
- 2009-03-06 Joanne Brackeen
- 2009-03-10 Hot Club of Detroit
- 2009-03-12 Barbara Carroll
- 2009-03-13 Jesse Green
- 2009-03-20 Kate McGarry
- 2009-04-10 Billy Taylor
- 2009-04-14 Bill Charlap
- 2009-04-17 Allen Toussaint
- 2009-04-24 Dick Hyman
- 2009-05-08 Mulgrew Miller
- 2009-05-12 Randy Weston
- 2009-05-15 Melissa Walker
- 2009-05-22 Roger Kellaway
- 2009-05-29 Grady Tate
- 2009-06-05 Studs Terkel
- 2009-06-26 Daryl Sherman
- 2009-07-03 Julian Lage
- 2009-07-10 Barbara Carroll
- 2009-07-17 Bobby Shaw
- 2009-07-23 Marcus Roberts
- 2009-07-31 Hank Jones
- 2009-08-12 Bucky Pizzarelli
- 2009-08-14 Jeremy Siskind
- 2009-08-21 Dave Samuels
- 2009-08-28 Allen Toussaint
- 2009-09-04 Keith Jarrett
- 2009-09-11 Bud Shank
- 2009-09-14 Vijay Iyer
- 2009-09-18 Matthew Shipp
- 2009-09-25 Roy Eldridge
- 2009-10-02 Daryl Sherman
- 2009-10-09 Dizzy's Club 1
- 2009-10-16 Dizzy's Club 2
- 2009-10-23 Dizzy's Club 3
- 2009-10-30 Blossom Dearie
- 2009-11-06 Aaron Diehl
- 2009-11-13 Randy Brecker
- 2009-11-20 George Shearing
- 2009-11-27 Sheila Jordan
- 2009-12-11 Beegie Adair
- 2009-12-14 Carol Welsman
- 2009-12-15 Joan Stiles
- 2009-12-18 Christmas Jazz
- 2009-12-24 Marian Petrescu

=== 2010s ===
- 2010-01-01 John Lewis
- 2010-01-08 Marian McPartland
- 2010-01-22 Cedar Walton
- 2010-01-29 Ron Carter
- 2010-02-05 Eubie Blake
- 2010-02-12 Janis Siegel
- 2010-02-16 Ted Nash
- 2010-02-19 Marcus Roberts
- 2010-02-26 Steve Kuhn
- 2010-03-05 Stacy Rowles
- 2010-03-12 Loston Harris
- 2010-03-19 Jimmy McPartland
- 2010-03-22 Romain Collin
- 2010-03-26 Bill Frisell
- 2010-04-02 Bucky Pizzarelli
- 2010-04-16 Phil Woods
- 2010-04-30 Carol Wells
- 2010-05-14 Kurt Elling
- 2010-05-21 Christian Sands
- 2010-05-28 Rosemary Clooney
- 2010-06-11 Denny Zeitlin
- 2010-06-25 Randy Weston
- 2010-07-09 Ted Nash
- 2010-07-09 The Nels Cline Singers
- 2010-07-16 Roman Collin
- 2010-07-23 John Bunch
- 2010-07-30 Pat Metheny
- 2010-08-02 Annie Ross
- 2010-08-06 Hank Jones
- 2010-08-13 Joyce Collins
- 2010-08-20 Clark Terry
- 2010-08-27 Allen Toussaint
- 2010-09-03 Vijay Iyer
- 2010-09-17 Joan Stiles
- 2010-09-24 Helen Merrill
- 2010-10-01 Nels Cline
- 2010-10-04 Nellie McKay
- 2010-10-08 Bill Evans
- 2010-10-22 Alicia Keys
- 2010-10-29 Doctor John
- 2010-11-05 Catherine Russell
- 2010-11-08 Brian Lynch
- 2010-11-12 Chick Corea
- 2010-11-12 Jonathan Batiste
- 2010-11-19 Milt Hinton
- 2010-12-03 Nellie McKay
- 2010-12-10 Dave Brubeck
- 2010-12-17 Annie Ross
- 2011-01-12 Nicki Parrott
- 2011-01-12 Roberta Piket
- 2011-01-13 Roberta Gambarini
- 2011-01-28 Jonathan Batiste
- 2011-02-04 Brian Lynch
- 2011-02-11 Latin Jazz
- 2011-02-18 Shirley Horn
- 2011-02-25 Roberta Piket
- 2011-03-04 Lady singers
- 2011-03-11 Nicki Parrott
- 2011-04-01 Roberta Gambarini
- 2011-04-08 Billy Taylor
- 2011-04-15 Veronica Nunn
- 2011-04-22 Mercer Ellington
- 2011-04-29 Bela Flek
- 2011-05-06 Karrin Allyson
- 2011-09-09 Bobby Short
- 2011-09-16 Kenny Werner
- 2011-09-23 Alice Coltrane
- 2011-09-30 Toots Thielemans
- 2011-10-07 Sheila Jordan
- 2011-10-21 Chuck Leavell
- 2011-10-28 Julian Lage
- 2011-11-04 Joanne Brackeen
- 2011-11-11 John Lewis
- 2011-11-18 Albert Dailey
- 2011-11-25 Herbie Hancock
- 2011-12-02 Bud Shank
- 2011-12-16 Christmas Music
- 2011-12-23 Gary Burton
- 2011-12-30 Stephen Sondheim
- 2012-01-13 Matthew Shipp
- 2012-01-20 Randy Weston
- 2012-01-27 Michel Camilo
- 2012-02-03 Clark Terry
- 2012-02-17 Ed Reid
- 2012-02-24 Bobby Broom
- 2012-04-27 Clare Fischer
- 2012-05-04 Ellis Larkins
- 2012-05-11 Daryl Sherman
- 2012-06-22 Dave McKenna
- 2012-08-17 Melissa Walker
- 2012-09-21 Jesse Green
- 2012-09-28 Blossom Dearie
- 2012-10-05 Milt Hinton
- 2012-10-12 Dr John
- 2012-10-19 Eubie Blake
- 2012-10-26 Willie Nelson
- 2012-11-02 Elizabeth Doyle
- 2012-11-16 Anat Cohen
- 2012-11-23 Tony Bennett
- 2012-11-30 Russell Malone
- 2012-12-07 Dave Brubeck
- 2012-12-14 Steve Kuhn
- 2012-12-21 Christmas Jazz
- 2012-12-28 John Lewis
- 2013-01-04 Milt Jackson
- 2013-01-11 Kurt Elling
- 2013-01-18 Chick Corea
- 2013-01-25 Bill Evans
- 2013-02-01 Bill Frisell
- 2013-02-08 Randy Weston
- 2013-02-15 George Duke
- 2013-02-22 DeeDee Bridgewater
- 2013-03-01 Kevin Eubanks
- 2013-03-08 Stacy Rowles
- 2013-03-15 Linda Ronstadt
- 2013-03-22 Diana Krall
- 2013-03-29 Shirley Scott
- 2013-04-05 Mose Allison
- 2013-04-12 Eddie Palmieri
- 2013-04-19 Esperanza Spalding
- 2013-04-26 Pat Metheny
- 2013-05-03 Phil Woods
- 2013-05-10 Jane Monheit
- 2013-05-17 Grady Tate
- 2013-05-24 Barbara Carroll
- 2013-05-31 Bela Fleck
- 2013-08-23 Kenny Barron
- 2013-08-30 Dave Douglas
- 2013-09-06 Chuck Mangione
- 2013-09-13 Rosemary Clooney
- 2013-09-20 Kate McGarry
- 2013-09-27 Eliane Elias
- 2013-10-04 Carline Ray
- 2013-10-25 Billy Taylor
- 2013-11-08 Anat Cohen
- 2014-06-06 Amina Claudine Myers
- 2014-11-14 Ruth Brown
- 2014-11-21 Ravi Coltrane
- Bill Crow (tape of Marian, Bill and Joe Morello)Jan 2011
- Howard Alden
- Steve Allen
- Patricia Barber
- Richie Beirach
- Andy Bey
- Joe Bushkin
- Jeanie Bryson
- Joey Calderazzo
- Valerie Capers
- Chris Connor
- Bill Dobbins
- Dave Douglas
- Percy Faith
- Chuck Folds
- Daryl Grant
- Mike LeDonne
- Liz Magnes
- Monica Mancini
- Marie Marcus
- Ellis Marsalis
- Susannah McCorkle
- Loonis McGlohon
- Myra Melford
- Dudley Moore
- Mark Murphy
- Rose Murphy
- Harry Pickens
- Chris Potter
- Judy Roberts
- Claudio Roditi
- Jimmie Rowles
- Diane Schuur
- Paul Shaffer
- Jack Sheldon
- Ayako Shirasaki
- Travis Shook
- Cecilia Smith
- Derek Smith
- Lonnie Liston Smith
- Stephen Sondheim
- Liz Story
- Ira Sullivan
- Ralph Sutton
- Studs Terkel
- Steve Turre
- Roseanna Vitro
- Michael Wolff
