= Celebration of the Arts Festival =

The Celebration of the Arts festival (COTA), is an annual event held in Delaware Water Gap, Pennsylvania. The event is held in September.

The event is presented in cooperation with the Borough of Delaware Water Gap, Castle Hill Development, Inc., and the Delaware River Joint Toll Bridge Commission.

== The beginning ==
Phil Woods, Rick Chamberlain and Ed Joubert founded the organization Celebration of the Arts in 1978 late one night in the bar at the Deer Head Inn in Delaware Water Gap. The organization would eventually become the Delaware Water Gap Celebration of the Arts. Their initial goal was to help foster an appreciation of jazz and its relationship to other artistic disciplines.

The first festival was staged later that year, on a shoe-string budget. The sponsors for the event included the Delaware Water Gap Chamber of Commerce, the Lions Club, and the Antoine Dutot Museum. Participating musicians, artists, and vendors were all drawn from the northeastern Pennsylvania area, thus establishing a festival precedent - in addition to showcasing the many nationally known musicians and artists residing in the Pocono area, the annual festival is also designed to provide an opportunity for many talented, though lesser-known, musicians to be heard.

Festival one raised $300 for the Borough of Delaware Water Gap. At the first Celebration of the arts festival admission was one dollar per attendee. Bands play on a makeshift stage in the street, where there is theatre as well. As of 2021 admission for adults is $30.00 per day (a two-day ticket is $50.00) for 8 hours of music per day.

== Significant Events Through the Years ==
Throughout the years, many things have changed to make the festival what it is today, including:

- 1979 - The Fred Waring Award, presented in recognition of outstanding contributions to the arts and the community, is initiated by Rick Chamberlain during Festival 2, with the initial honor going to the man for whom the award is named. As well as being known as the man behind Waring Blenders, Mr. Waring was also a musician and singer/songwriter and the man behind what would become Fred Waring's U.S. Chorus, a choral group made up of the best high school chorus members around the United States. A tradition of honoring community activism is established, and will become a vital part of the COTA endeavor.
- 1981 - The COTA Cats are added and become one of the most anticipated yearly acts of the festival. Also, new this year is the juried art show, for work with a musical theme, precursor to the Music Motif Show.
- 1983 - Festival six attracts more than 4,000 people The festival is captured on video for the first time, for broadcast over public television station WVIA-TV.
- 1984 - The annual COTA Cats Scholarship, designed to acknowledge outstanding musical achievement and festival spirit, is established and presented for the very first time. In addition to a cash award, each recipient will be given a certificate signed by Phil Woods, and have his or her name inscribed on a plaque displayed inside the Deer Head Inn. For the first time, the festival is broadcast live over WESS-FM, the East Stroudsburg University radio station.
- 1985 - The Music Hall the Castle Inn is destroyed by fire on March 29, and the landscape for Festival 8 is changed.
- 1987 - The COTA festival celebrates its 10th anniversary. Forced to perform inside due to bad weather for the first time, the festival goes on. Festival 10 also begins on Friday night for the first time (previously, the festival was Saturday and Sunday only).
- 1989 - During festival 12, COTA joins with the Borough of Delaware Water Gap to celebrate the 100th anniversary of the incorporation of the town, scene of a storied musical history outlined in this year's program. The Sterling Strauser Award is created this year to honor artistic contributions to the visual arts; the award's name-sake is also its first recipient, one of the area's most accomplished and revered painters, and a long-time supporter of the local arts community.
- 1991 - The Volunteer of the Year Award, established to honor COTA volunteer spirit, is presented for the first time, in memory of long-time volunteer Joanne Mayer. Radio station WRTI-FM, from Temple University, broadcasts the festival live.
- 1994 - Festival seventeen is presented on a newly constructed $10,000 stage. This year, COTA receives the Spectrum Award from WVIA-FM in Scranton, in recognition of its contributions to the advancement of the arts and its enrichment of the cultural life in the WVIA-FM Public Radio listening area.
- 1995, the year of Festival Eighteen, COTA reaches a long-term lease agreement with the National Park Service, which allowed the organization to make improvements on the land across from main stage. A master plan was developed for the phased development of a natural amphitheater-like festival setting.
- 1997 - On January 21 & 22, Phil Woods rounds up the Festival Orchestra, along with his quintet, into Red Rock Studios to record what becomes entitled "Celebration!" The DWG COTA Festival Orchestra performs once again while the impending CD is mastered for release later this year, unbeknownst to anyone at the time that "Celebration!" will be nominated for a Grammy in less than a year.
- 2007 - The 30th Anniversary of COTA - Phil Woods orchestrates and performs The Children's Suite - set to the words of A.A. Milne's "Now We Are Six" collection of poems.
- 2011 - The 34th Anniversary of COTA dedicated to the life and work of jazz legend and COTA contributor Bob Dorough. The COTA Cats perform Comin' Home Baby, Devil May Care, and Conjunction Junction.

== Jazz Mass ==
A non-denominational mass that blends music and spirituality, the Jazz Mass is a very large draw for the COTA festival weekend and is performed on Sunday morning. The first Jazz Mass was said and sung at the Presbyterian Church of the Mountain in Delaware Water Gap. The Music is performed by the Delaware Water Gap COTA Festival Orchestra. The Jazz Mass was first made available on CD in 1995. A remastered edition was released in 2014 and sold by COTA at a booth during the festival and online.

== COTA Cats ==
In 1981, The COTA Cats were introduced. The Cats come together through the continued efforts of Pat Dorian and Phil Woods, and are a major feature of each festival.

The COTA Cats were the brainchild of Phil Woods, when he sent a letter to twenty-six high school band directors in May about creating a band of high school students for that year's festival. Pat Dorian, a trumpet player and local music educator, was the only one to respond. Dorian has been the band leader since the COTA cats began and continues to recruit some of the best young musicians within a 25-mile radius. The big band is considered by many to be the most significant change to the COTA festival in its history. It symbolizes everything that the festival means to those involved.

Festival thirteen, in 1990, marked the tenth anniversary of the COTA Cats, who played that year before a festival crowd of well over 4,000. The Cats have continued to send their alumni to such institutions as Indiana University, the Berklee College of Music in Boston, the Juilliard School in New York, the Eastman School of Music in Rochester and the University of North Texas.

The ensemble is now directed by Tim Reiche.

== CAMPJAZZ ==
In 2007, Campjazz began. A one-week program focused on studying improvisation, theory, ear-training, and history in relation to jazz for age 12 and up. Applicants can apply at the beginner, intermediate, or advanced level. Recording takes place at the Red Rock Recording Studio. Performances take place at the Castle Inn in the Delaware Water Gap.

== Performers ==
Over the years, thousands of bands and solo musicians have played for the crowds including:

=== Musicians ===
Phil Woods, Al Cohn, Urbie Green and Kathy Green, George Young, Jesse Green, Nancy and Spencer Reed, Hal Galper, Bob Dorough, Tom Harrell, Jim McNeely, Dave Liebman, Joe LaBarbera, Glenn Davis, Bill Charlap, Jamey Haddad, Steve Turre, Billy Hart, Jerry Dodgion, Nelson Hill, Lew DelGatto, Bill Goodwin, Paul Rostock, Hal Crook, Caris Visentin, Vic Juris, Eric Doney, John Swana, Bill Mays, Stephanie Nakasian, Hod O'Brien, Veronica Swift, Adam Nussbaum, Teddy Charles, Jerry Harris, Michele Bautier, Kenny Werner, Dave Leonhardt, Alex Watkins, Phil Markowitz, Bob Grauso, Kim Parker, Alan Gaumer, Craig Kastelnik, Janet Lawson, John Coates, Jr., Kate & Richie Roche, Steve Gilmore (musician), Tony Marino, Len Mooney, Neil Braunstein, Jim Daniels, Bobby Davis, Bud Nealy, Joe Locke, Eric Mintel, Martin Wind, Matt Wilson, Clarice Assad, Jon Ballantyne, Billy Test, Kirk Reese, Tom Kozik, Jay Rattman, Bobby Avey, Jim Ridl, Jay Anderson, Davey Lantz, Bill Washer, Jay Leonhart, Carolyn Leonhart, Jay Cameron, Lara Bello, Chico Huff, Richard Burton, Johnny DeFrancesco, Adam Niewood, Joe Lovano, Sue Terry, Roseanna Vitro, Tomoko Ohno, Jackie Warren, Amy Shook, Mitchell Cheng, Luke Carlos O’Reilly, Tyler Dempsey, Joe Micheals, Matt Vashlishan, Adrain Moring, Connor Koch, Najwa Parkins, Evan Gregor, Glenn Ferracone, Skip Wilkins, Dan Wilkins, Terrell Stafford, Alex Ritz, Esteban Castro, Cole Davis, Jon Gordon, Rich Jenkins, Tim Carbone, Ron Oswanski, Marko Marcinko, Bobby Velez, Vicki Doney, Marianne Solivan, Patrick McGee, Larry McKenna, Gene Perla, Ryan Devlin, Steve Kortyka, Mike Bond, Nicole Glover, Roxy Coss, Nic Cacioppo, Oscar Williams II, plus many more.

More recently Nellie McKay, Simone, and Sherrie Miracle and Fiveplay have been appearing along with younger groups that consist of COTA CAT alumni.

=== Groups ===
Asparagus Sunshine, Chris Solliday Trio, Butch Tucker Quartet, Jazzberries, Steve Gilmore/Steve Brown Quintet, Steamin' Jimmies with Sugar Cone Horns, George Young and Low Profile, Lee Katzman's Bebop Six, Jimmy Tigue Trio, Ralph Hughes Jazz Reunion, Grandma's Soup, Dave Liebman's Quintet, The Pocono Jazz Quintet, The Eric Doney Trio, The Drewes-Haddad Band, The Lee Katzman Quintet, The Pete Veltri Quintet, the Robert D'Aversa Band, Jerry Harris & Jazz Renaissance, Baroque Wind Ensemble, Water Gap Players, Sankofa African Drum & Dance Ensemble, the Alex Watkins Quartet, Jesse Heckman's Quartet, Active Ingredients, the Jesse Green Trio, the Donna Antonow Trio, David Leonhardt Jazz Group, The Absolute Trio, Swing 'N Dixie, Alex Watkins' Bayou Band, Bill Goodwin Trio, The Jazz Farmers, Funk Ed, The Dixie Gents, Co-op Bop,

=== Appearances ===
Peter Coyote, Peter Dennis, Jim Connors
