= Deer Head Inn =

Jazz club and inn in Delaware Water Gap, Pennsylvania, USA

Coordinates: 40.983015°N 75.140738°W

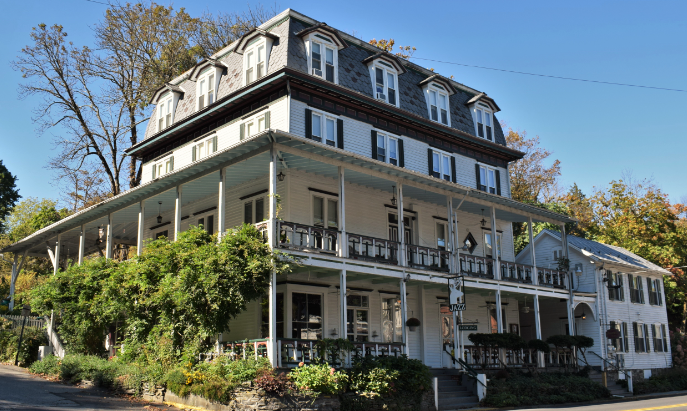

The Deer Head Inn is a jazz club and inn located in Delaware Water Gap, Pennsylvania. Established in the nineteenth century, the Deer Head Inn became the after hours, artistic home for jazz musicians who worked in the Pocono Mountain Resorts in the mid-twentieth century. Artists have included: Zoot Sims, Stan Getz, Phil Woods, Urbie Green, Dave Liebman, Keith Jarrett, Bill Charlap, Bill Goodwin (jazz Drummer), and Bob Dorough. In 1992, pianist Keith Jarrett recorded the live album At the Deer Head Inn there. The performance was to relaunch the club under new owners. Prior to the piano recording, when Jarrett played, he usually sat in on drums.

Pianist John Coates Jr. played at the club for around 50 years, beginning in 1956. In the late 1970s and early 1980s, he recorded several albums there. Woods became a frequent performer at the club after moving to the area in the early 1970s.

The Deer Head, originally named the Central House, was built in the 1840s. It is a Victorian with a mansard roof like the medium-sized hotels of Cape May, New Jersey. With its broad porches and jerkinhead dormers in the mansard, it conveys the character of the resort after the Civil War. It was bought by Mary Carrig, Dennis Carrig, Robert Mancuso, and Jason Wilson in 2005. Prior to them, the Lehr Family owned it for many years. A short history of the Inn and its importance to the jazz legacy of the region is discussed in the 2011 book The Poconos in B Flat.
