= Jesse Green (jazz musician) =

American jazz pianist, composer and arranger

- Born: 1971 (age 54–55)
- Genre: Jazz
- Occupation: Musician
- Instrument: Piano
- Label: Chiaroscuro

Jesse Green (born 1971) is an American jazz pianist, composer, arranger, and record producer. He has recorded three albums as a leader, all released by Chiaroscuro Records.

== Early life ==
Green is the son of trombonist Urbie Green and vocalist Kathy Preston. "He started tinkering on the piano picking out tunes as early as age three. When he was six he began piano lessons but the young musician did not decide to make a career out of music until he was already in junior college." Green's first classical piano influence was his cousin Erin. When he was ten, he was a finalist in a nationwide talent competition; winning for his piano rendition of Count Basie’s Jumping at the Woodside. At high school, he played trombone with numerous bands: District Concert Band, Regional Concert Band, All-State Jazz Ensemble, Fred Waring's U.S. Chorus, National Honors Jazz Band, District Chorus Instrument Ensemble, and the John Philip Sousa Memorial Concert Band. During his junior year in high school, he became a member of the East Stroudsburg University Jazz Ensemble. He was piano accompanist for District Chorus as well as the high school chorus, and, for five consecutive years, he was pianist for the Celebration of the Arts Festival COTA Cats (a big band founded by Phil Woods).

As a student at East Stroudsburg University, Green played trombone in the Concert Band and Brass Ensemble, and piano in the Jazz Ensemble. With this Jazz Ensemble, Green performed with Clark Terry, Lew Tabackin, Freddie Hubbard, Al Grey, Urbie Green, Phil Woods, Dave Liebman, Benny Carter, and Jimmy Heath. As a trombonist, Jesse was selected two years in a row for the Inter-Collegiate Concert Band.

At age 17, Jesse won the National Downbeat Student Award for "best extended composition and arrangement" with his original "Half & Half". He has since written many other arrangements for big band as well as small groups. "Blues for Dad", written for his father, was performed by the COTA Cats at the 1989 COTA Jazz Festival.

== Later life and career ==
Green signed to Chiaroscuro Records in 1992. His debut album, Lift Off, featured Paul Rostock on bass, Bobby Durham on drums, and guest Joe Cohn on guitar. Green's second album, Sea Journey, was released in 1995. This was a live recording on the S.S. Norway and included Jackie Williams on drums, Michael Moore on bass, and guest Gary Burton on vibes. In 1995 Jesse appeared with the Urbie Green Quintet on the Royal Caribbean “Majesty of the Seas”; a live recording of the quintet, Sea Jam Blues, was released in 1997. Jesse's 2002 album, Sylvan Treasure, featured guest saxophonists Phil Woods, Dave Liebman and Chris Potter, as well as Pat Dorian on trumpet, Bruce Cox on drums, and Frank Hauch on bass.

In 1998, Green took first place at the American Pianists Association's Fourth Biennial Jazz Piano Competition in Indianapolis, from judges Dr. Billy Taylor, Danilo Perez and Jim Turner. As a result, he was named the first Jazz Fellow of the American Pianists Association. These awards brought Green many opportunities to perform internationally. In 2002 Green was selected fourth in the world in the largest jazz piano competition – the Martial Solal Jazz Piano Competition held in France. In 2006 he won first place in The Great American Jazz Piano Competition in Jacksonville, Florida.

In 2009, NPR reported that Green "spends most of his time teaching piano and trombone out of the home he shares [in Delaware Water Gap] with his wife and three daughters". He appeared on Piano Jazz, hosted by Marian McPartland, in October 2008.

With his trio, Green has appeared at the Deer Head Inn in Delaware Water Gap, Pennsylvania; the Hillside Inn Jazz Lounge; River Street Jazz Café; and Blues Street Jazz Club, all Pocono area jazz clubs. Green's trio (Bruce Cox on drums and Frank Hauck on bass) performed with Phil Woods at various concert venues in the tri-state area. Green has also appeared at Scullers Jazz Club in Boston, Massachusetts; the Jazz at the Y series in New York's 92nd Street Y; Zinno's in New York; the Main Street Jazz Festival in Columbia, South Carolina and the 1999 Indy Jazz Festival. In July 2000, Green performed at the United States Day in the United Kingdom's Millennium Dome as a member of a US delegation presented by the White House Millennium Council.

== Arrest and conviction ==
Green was arrested on May 17, 2013, and charged with the felony crimes of involuntary deviate sexual intercourse with a person under age 16, contacting/communicating with a minor to commit sexual offenses, aggravated indecent assault against a person under age 16, indecent assault against a person under age 13 and endangering a child's welfare (corrupting a minor), along with the misdemeanor crime of indecent assault against a person under age 16.

Green was sentenced in May 2014, and is currently serving his term in SCI Camp Hill, Camp Hill, Pennsylvania.

== Discography ==
=== As leader ===
Year recorded	Title	Label	Personnel/Notes
1992	Lift Off	Chiaroscuro	With Joe Cohn (guitar), Paul Rostock (bass), Bobby Durham (drums)
1993	Sea Journey	Chiaroscuro	Some tracks trio, with Michael Moore (bass), Jackie Williams (drums); some tracks quartet, with Gary Burton (vibes), Gene Bertoncini (guitar), or Joe Cohn (guitar) added; in concert
2002	Sylvan Treasure	Chiaroscuro	With Frank Hauch (bass), Bruce Cox (drums); plus guests Patrick Doran (flugelhorn), Chris Potter (soprano sax, tenor sax), Phil Woods (alto sax), Dave Liebman (tenor sax), Jerry Davis (vocals)
