= Joyce Collins =

American jazz musician

Joyce Collins (May 5, 1930 – January 3, 2010) was an American jazz pianist, singer and educator.

== Life and career ==
Collins was born in Battle Mountain, Nevada, United States. She began playing piano professionally at the age of 15 while still attending Reno High School in Nevada. She studied both music and teaching at the San Francisco State College. Concurrently she performed solo and in ensembles at various jazz clubs, leading to touring with the Frankie Carle band.

Collins relocated to Los Angeles in the late 1950s, finding occupation there and in Reno and Las Vegas. At the latter location she conducted one of the resort's show bands, becoming the first female to achieve this feat. Collins also worked in film and television, with a decade-long stint on the Mary Tyler Moore Show as well as playing on Bob Newhart's show. In 1975 she commenced a jazz piano teaching role at the Dick Grove Music School, which continued for many years.

She recorded alongside Bill Henderson, and both Street of Dreams (1979) and A Tribute to Johnny Mercer (1981) albums were nominated for Grammy Awards. Later that decade Collins coached Jeff Bridges and Beau Bridges for their 1989 film roles in The Fabulous Baker Boys. Collins wrote and arranged music, which included devising a program aimed at following the involvement of women as jazz composers and lyricists. She appeared twice on Marian McPartland's Piano Jazz radio show, most recently in 2002.

She has performed solo, in duos and trios, and played in Bill Berry's Big Band setting. Her debut album was issued in 1961, but her next recording, Moment To Moment, was only released in 1981. Although her base was Los Angeles, Collins variously worked in Mexico City, Paris, New York and Brazil.

Joyce Collins died on January 3, 2010, at the age of 79, in Los Angeles.

== Discography ==
- Girl Here Plays Mean Piano (Jazzland, 1960)
- Moment to Moment (Discovery, 1981)
- Sweet Madness (Audiophile, 1990)
- Embraces the Heart of Brazil (Audiophile, 2005)

With Bill Henderson

- Live at the Times (Discovery, 1975)
- Joey Revisited (Monad, 1976)
- Street of Dreams (Discovery, 1979)
- Something's Gotta Give (Discovery, 1979)
- A Tribute to Johnny Mercer (Discovery, 1981)

With Paul Horn

- Paul Horn and the Concert Ensemble (Ovation, 1969)
