= Daniela Schächter =

Italian jazz musician (born 1972)

- Born: 14 February 1972 (age 54)
- Genres: Jazz, vocal jazz
- Occupations: Singer, musician, composer, arranger, educator
- Instruments: Vocals, piano
- Years active: 1987–present
- Label: Splasc
- Website: danielaschachter.com

Daniela Schächter (born 14 February 1972) is an Italian jazz singer and pianist.

== Career ==
Schächter started on piano when she was eight. In her teens, she performed professionally in Italy and Sicily and worked as a studio musician. In 1998, she attended the Berklee College of Music, where she was taught by Joanne Brackeen. She issued her first album independently in 2001.

Schächter appeared on the radio program Piano Jazz after the host, Marian McPartland, heard she won the Mary Lou Williams jazz piano contest.

Schächter has worked with Patti Austin, Regina Carter, Terri Lyne Carrington, John Dankworth, Shirley Horn, Ingrid Jensen, Christian McBride, Al McKibbon, Tiger Okoshi, Phil Wilson, New York Voices, and the Clayton-Hamilton Jazz Orchestra.

== Awards and honors ==
- Mary Lou Williams Jazz Piano Competition, 2005
- Betty Carter Jazz Ahead Competition, 2002

== Discography ==
- Quintet (2001)
- I Colori Del Mare (Splasc, 2006)
- Purple Butterfly (2009)
- Vanheusenism (2016)
