= John Coates Jr. =

Musical artist (1938–2017)

John Coates Jr
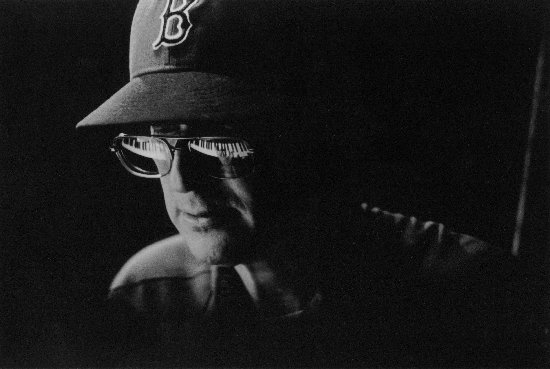

Background information
- Born: John Francis Coates; February 17, 1938; Trenton, New Jersey, U.S.
- Died: November 22, 2017 (aged 79) Scranton, Pennsylvania, U.S.
- Genre: Jazz
- Instruments: Piano, Vibraphones
- Labels: Savoy, Omnisound, Pacific St Records, Deer Head Inn Records

John Francis Coates Jr. (February 17, 1938 – November 22, 2017) was an American jazz pianist, composer and arranger. He regularly performed at the Deer Head Inn and the Celebration of the Arts in the Pocono Mountains for over 50 years.

== Early life ==
Coates was born in Trenton, New Jersey and attended Ewing High School. His father was a full-time performing musician and a bandleader, and his mother was a dancer and actress. He began his formal study every Thursday traveling from Trenton to New York City at age eight with Urana Clarke at the Mannes College of Music on full scholarship. Early influences were credited to listening to Symphony Sid on his AM radio. On Wednesdays, from age 11 to 14, John would play clarinet with his father at the Trenton YMCA dance hall night, where he learned to improvise. His father began teaching him jazz piano around age 12. Another of his father's students, Jack Weigand, influenced Coates and talked him into joining the Trenton musicians union at age 12. By age 14 he was playing gigs two nights a week, as well as weekends. At age 16, Coates was asked to play six nights a week during the summer at the Deer Head Inn, where he lived and ate dinner with the proprietors, Bob and Fey Lehr. It was that summer at the Deer Head where Savoy Records discovered him.

== Professional career ==
He recorded his first LP, Portrait, with bassist Wendell Marshall and drummer Kenny Clarke and produced by Rudy Van Gelder, for Savoy Records during his senior year of high school. He performed on the Steve Allen, Mike Douglas, and Merv Griffin TV shows in support of that album. From 1956 to 1958 he toured with Charlie Ventura playing clubs like Birdland, Small's Paradise, the Blue Note, the Brass Rail, and The Flame among others. After Ventura and while in college John played with Barry Miles, Eddie Gomez, Ron Carter, Woody Shaw, Harry Leahey, Al Cohn, Zoot Sims, Kal Winding, Urbie Green, and Pepper Adams.

He attended Rutgers University and graduated with a degree in romance languages in 1962. After graduating from Rutgers in 1962, John returned to the Deer Head where he played 6 nights a week, four alone and two as bandleader. Around this time that he took a position with Shawnee Press as an arranger and editor. He began to rotate summers at the Deer Head and winters at Henderson's Club 50, where he also had a 6 night per week gig. At Henderson's he played with Coleman Hawkins, Clark Terry, Doc Severinsen, Phil Woods, Marvin Stamm and Bill Watrous among others. In 1966 John moved to Mountain Lake, New Jersey and began a full time 9 to 5 job with Shawnee Press editing during the day, arranging on his own time on a royalty basis, while also playing at the Deer Head year round where he became an early inspiration for Keith Jarrett, who would listen and sit in occasionally. He ceased working full-time with Shawnee in 1977, but continued doing occasional arrangement and composition work (including choral works) for the press. His arrangement for "Amazing Grace" has sold more the 750,000 copies and remains one of the publishing company's best sellers.

From 1974 John recorded nine albums for the record label Omnisound. He recorded multiple live albums for them at Northampton Community College, the Deer Head, and even Japan. Following those records he toured briefly with bassist Paul Langosch. Starting in 1993 John began recording for Pacific St Records, including two album with Phil Woods. John promoted these albums at several venues including Blues Alley in Washington DC. Later in the 1990s, Coates became homeless and attempted suicide, then moved to Coney Island and began playing again around the year 2000. He married Lisa Haines in 1961; the couple divorced in 1963, but remarried in 2012. Coates's second marriage to Haines was his fourth overall.

Coates performed primarily as a pianist, but also occasionally played vibraphone and clarinet.

== Discography ==
Year	Album title	Record label	Personnel
1956	Portrait	Savoy	John Coates Jr Wendell Marshall Kenny Clark
1974	The Jazz Piano of John Coates Jr	Omnisound	John Coates Jr
1977	Alone and Live at the Deer Head	Omnisound	John Coates Jr
1978	After the Before	Omnisound	John Coates Jr
1978	In Open Space	Omnisound	John Coates Jr
1979	Rainbow Road	Omnisound	John Coates Jr
1979	Tokyo Concert	Omnisound	John Coates Jr
1982	Pocono Friends	Omnisound	John Coates Jr, Steve Gilmore, Phil Woods Harry Leahey, George Young, Urbie Green
1982	Pocono Friends Encore	Omnisound	John Coates Jr, Steve Gilmore, Phil Woods Harry Leahey, George Young, Urbie Green
1995	Piano Forte	Pacific St Records	John Coates Jr
1996	The Trio Session	Pacific St Records	John Coates Jr, Paul Langosch, Mike Smith
1999	Duets	Pacific St Records	John Coates Jr, Eric Doney
2002	Giants at Play	Pacific St Records	John Coates Jr, Phil Woods
2006	Giants at Work	Pacific St Records	John Coates Jr, Phil Woods
2014	Live at the Deer Head Inn	Deer Head Inn Records	John Coates Jr, Nancy Reed
