= Scullers Jazz Club =

Coordinates: 42°21′36″N 71°7′7″W

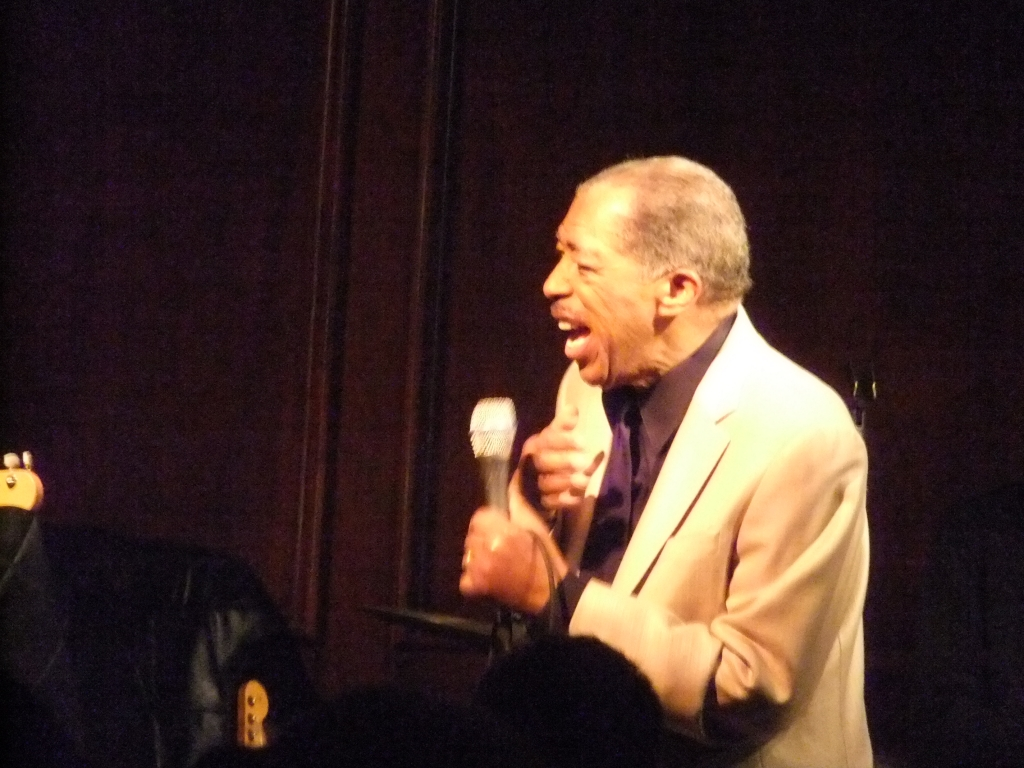
Ben E. King performing live at Scullers in 2012

Scullers Jazz Club is a jazz club in Allston, Massachusetts, situated in the Doubletree Guest Suites Hotel on Soldiers Field Road, which overlooks the Charles River. It was established in 1989 and also hosts Latin, blues, soul, R & B, and World Music acts. A broad range of artists have played the club from Ben E. King, Jesse Green, The J. Geils Band, Eyran Katsenelenbogen and Earl Klugh, to more popular singers such as Harry Connick Jr., Quincy Jones, Jamie Cullum, Michael Bublé and Tony Bennett.
