= Stacy Rowles =

American jazz musician

Stacy Amanda Rowles (September 11, 1955 in Los Angeles – October 30, 2009 in Burbank, California) was an American jazz trumpeter, flugelhornist, and vocalist. She was the daughter of Jimmy Rowles.

Rowles learned piano and percussion in her youth before settling on trumpet, which she studied with Charlie Shoemake. She played alongside her father at the 1973 Monterey Jazz Festival and played with Clark Terry's all-female big band in 1975. She also worked with the all-female quintet the Jazzbirds, led by Betty O'Hara, as well as the Jazz Tap Ensemble, Maiden Voyage and the DIVA Big Band. She played with Clayton-Hamilton Jazz Orchestra.

She appeared on NPR's Piano Jazz with Marian McPartland in 2001. She died from complications in an automobile accident in 2009.

== Discography ==
Main Source: Allmuisc

As Leader

- Tell It Like It Is (Concord Jazz, 1984)

With Jimmy Rowles

- Looking Back (Delos, 1988)
- Me and the Moon (American Jazz Symposium, 1993)

With Ben Sluijs

- Till Next Time (September, 1991)

As Guest

- Nels Cline, Angelica (Enja Records,1988)
- Norma Winstone, Well Kept Secret (Hot House, 1995)
