= Riyoko Takagi =

Japanese jazz pianist and composer

Riyoko Takagi 高木里代子
External image
- Riyoko Takagi ('Midnight in Blue' 2023 album theme)

Background information
- Born: September 20, 1984 (age 41); Tokyo, Japan
- Genres: Jazz; Classical; Pop; House
- Occupations: Musician, composer
- Instruments: Piano, keyboards, keytar
- Years active: 2005–present
- Labels: HARU, HD Impression, Avex Trax, Steelpan
- Website: https://www.riyoko.jp

Riyoko Takagi (高木里代子, Takagi Riyoko; born 20 September 1984) is a Japanese jazz pianist and composer.

== Early life and education ==
Riyoko Takagi was born in Tokyo. Her mother was an aspiring classical pianist. Takagi started taking piano lessons in her neighborhood at the age of 4. Shortly after she acclimated to piano, her piano teacher advised that she should learn composing music rather than just continuing to play according to the score.

She enrolled into a specialized children's program at Yamaha Music School, where she studied classical piano and composition. At Yamaha she had her first piano recital at age 7 and her first televised piano performance of original composition at age 12 as part of annual Yamaha Original Junior Concert. She continued her studies at Yamaha until third year of junior high school.

At the age of 17 she started seriously focusing on jazz for the first time. Instead of focusing on jazz theory she started focusing on practical aspects of improvisation, studying from live albums of artists such as Bill Evans and Keith Jarrett. Over decades that followed, she developed a strong foundation in the art of improvisation, which to this day remains an appealing centerpiece of her live performance style, including impromptu improvisations based on random sound input from the audience or surroundings (for example, a siren of an ambulance that happened to pass by).

All her family graduated from Keio University, so she enrolled at Keio University SFC to study creative use of computers, wanting to focus on music, but the program was not what she expected. She did not study music in college and graduated in 2007 in Environment and Information Studies. While attending Keio, she started playing jazz in local piano lounges and bars, which remained her main activity that she continued throughout her career, even while doing other stints outside of authentic jazz.

== Career ==
Takagi's music career with discographic output started in 2008.

In 2008, she started working as a keyboardist for the club-based house unit Inner City Jam Orchestra. She continued this club-music activity in parallel with her jazz music activities until the late 2010s.

In 2009, her first jazz piano trio album After Tears was released by HARU Records. Ryudo, her first album to contain original compositions as part of Inner City Jazz Orchestra, was released by Daiki Sound.

In 2014, she appeared in Blue Note Tokyo, where she performed with Lee Ritenour and others. In June 2014, she won 4th place in the piano category in Ritenour's sponsored competition, Six String Theory.

In 2015, her first solo jazz piano album, Salone, was released by HD Impression. In September 2015, she performed on two days of the 14th "Tokyo Jazz". In November 2015, Avex Trax released two of her mini-albums The Intro! and In Winter! (digital distribution only).

In 2016, Avex Trax released Takagi's first major label album, The Debut! incorporating jazz into Pop/House music genre. Under Avex Trax, she was marketed as a sexy J-Pop idol. She often performed at music festivals wearing a bikini or other sensational outfits and performed various anime cosplays on her YouTube channel. This change of direction resulted in some confusion among fans, as can be seen on Amazon reviews of her albums around this time period. Despite a new musical direction in album releases and new persona image, she still continued her live jazz piano activities in parallel. For example, she performed her jazz compositions in a jazz piano trio featuring jazz-fusion drummer Senri Kawaguchi and jazz bassist Nori Shiota. In February 2016, she won Jazz Japan magazine's - New Star award and appeared on their cover for the first time.

In April 2017, her second solo jazz piano album, Dream of You ~ Salone II was released by HD Impression.

In January 2018, she performed at Yamaha's event commemorating the one hundredth anniversary of Japan Jazz, "Golden Age of Jazz [100]", resulting in the release of the DVD Live Lab by Atos International, containing solo piano live performances from the event.

In September 2019, her third solo jazz piano album, Resonance, was released by HD Impression. It became a highly acclaimed work that showcased new musicality that spun a straight-ahead jazz piano.

In 2020-2021, during the COVID-19 pandemic, she was active in various production activities and her YouTube channel. Some videos she performed in during this time have garnered millions of views, such as those from a series of "disguised professional plays street piano".

In 2021, she began regular FM radio performances every third Monday on ShibuyaCross-FM, on her show segment called Sound Nova. In September 2021, she represented Japan in an annual televised Japan-Korea Exchange Festival and performed her jazz piano trio arrangements of K-Pop (BTS, Blackpink, BigBang, Yoon Mi-rae) in two sessions.

In November 2021, her second jazz piano trio album, Celebrity Standards, was released by her bassist friend's Nori Shiota's independent music label Steelpan Records. In January 2022, her third jazz piano trio album, Jewelry Box, was released by Steelpan Records. Both albums were recorded during the same session with the same supporting cast and released a few months apart, each featuring 60-40 split of her original compositions and her interpretations of popular jazz standard pieces. Jewelry Box also features her jazz arrangement of Ballade No. 1 In G minor, Op. 23 by Frédéric Chopin. These two albums represented the first time in her career where she had the freedom to do what she wanted. Both albums debuted at the top of jazz music category on Amazon Japan.

In January 2022, she appeared in the TV show "From That Girl, Me" starring as Yuka Kurotani, a composer and piano performer. She appeared on the cover of Jazz Japan magazine for the second time. She also began regular appearances as a pianist on Mondays and Thursdays on TBS's "THE TIME" TV show.

2023 was a very busy year for Takagi. In April, her fourth jazz piano trio album, The Piano Story, featuring the Japanese rhythm section players Hiroyuki Noritake and Yosuke Inoue was released by Steelpan Records, featuring 60-40 split of her original compositions and her interpretations of popular jazz standards and her jazz arrangement of Scherzo No. 1 in B minor, Op. 20 by Chopin. A country-wide tour to support the first album release of the year was held during May–August, including her first double-header performance at Billboard Live. In May, she appeared on the cover of Jazz Japan magazine for the third time. In September, around her birthday and during the downtime between two 2023 albums tours, Takagi composed her next (2024) album and as a challenge performed it on her birthday live celebration show held on September 29. The next album will feature several new challenging original jazz compositions in styles she has not done before, as well as jazzified arrangements of pieces by Franz Liszt and Nikolai Kapustin. In October, her fifth jazz piano trio album, Midnight in Blue, was released and was recorded during the same recording session and with the same supporting members as The Piano Story, featuring 30-70 split of her original compositions and her interpretations of jazz standards and geared for pleasant listening experience. A country-wide tour to support the second album release of the year was held during October–December, including a second performance at Billboard Live.

== Discography ==
=== Albums ===
- After Tears (HARU records, 2009) [Jazz piano trio]
- Ryudo (Daiki Sound, 2009) [keyboards, Inner City Jam Orchestra]
- Cure☆Jazz (Victor Entertainment, 2012) [featuring Riyoko Silent Jazz Case]
- Bousou Jazz II (Insense Music Works, 2013) [Purple Jazz Project - Anime theme performances on piano]
- Salone (HD Impression, 2015) [solo jazz piano - live album]
- The Debut! (Avex Trax, 2016) [Pop/EDM/Jazz]
- Dream of You ~ Salone II (HD Impression, 2017) [solo jazz piano]
- Resonance (HD Impression, 2019) [solo jazz piano]
- Celebrity Standards (Steelpan Records, 2021) [jazz piano trio]
- Jewelry Box (Steelpan Records, 2022) [jazz piano trio]
- The Piano Story (Steelpan Records, 2023) [jazz piano trio]
- Midnight in Blue (Steelpan Records, 2023) [jazz piano trio]
- One Another Day (Steelpan Records, 2024) [jazz piano trio]
- The Moments (Steelpan Records, 2024) [jazz piano trio]

=== Mini-Albums ===
- The Intro! (Avex Trax, 2015, digital distribution only) [solo jazz piano]
- In Winter! (Avex Trax, 2015, digital distribution only) [solo jazz piano]

=== DVD ===
- Live Lab (Atos International, 2018)
