= List of jazz clubs in Paris =

The following is a list of notable jazz clubs in Paris, past and present.

- The 7 Lézards (closed)
- Les Associés
- Autour de midi et minuit
- Le Baiser Salé
- fr:Bal Nègre (closed)
- Le Blue Note
- Blues Bar
- Le Bœuf sur le toit
- The Caméléon
- La Cave du 38 Riv'
- Le Caveau de la Huchette
- The Caveau des Oubliettes
- The Chapelle des Lombards
- Le Chat Qui Pêche
- Club Saint-Germain
- Le Duc des Lombards
- La Fontaine (closed)
- The Franc Pinot (closed)
- The Jazz Cartoon
- The Jazz Club Lionel Hampton
- Jazzland
- The Living Room
- fr:Mars Club (closed)
- New Morning
- fr:Le Petit Journal Montparnasse
- The Petit Journal Saint Michel
- Quatre Vents
- Sunset/Sunside (or Sunset Jazz Club)
- Le Tabou (closed)
- Le Tennessee

== See also ==
- French jazz
- List of jazz clubs
