= List of jazz venues =

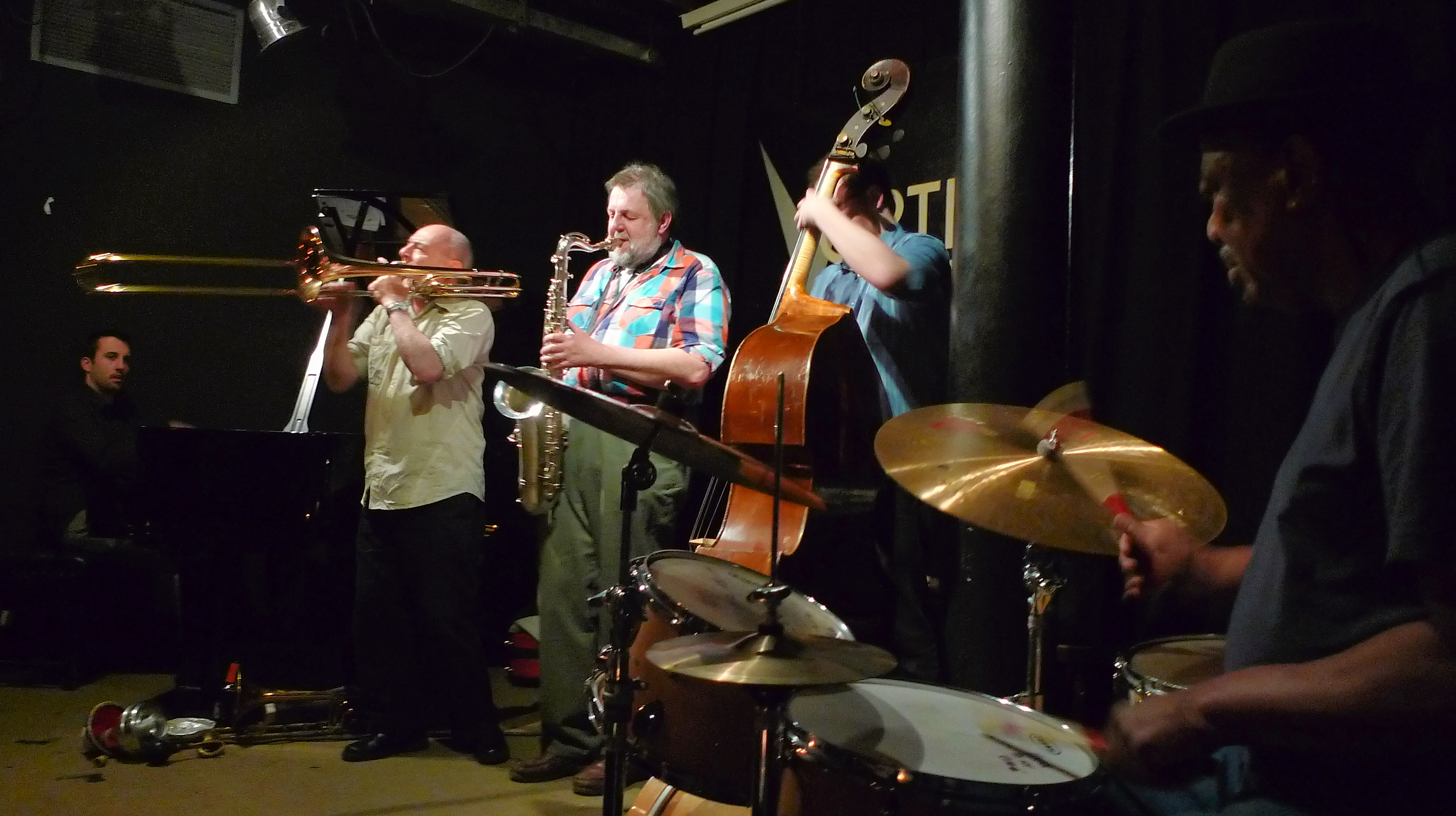
The Louis Moholo Quintet performing at a jazz club.

This is a list of notable venues where jazz music is played. It includes jazz clubs, clubs, dancehalls and historic venues such as theatres. A jazz club is a venue where the primary entertainment is the performance of live jazz music. Jazz clubs are usually a type of nightclub or bar, which is licensed to sell alcoholic beverages. Jazz clubs were in large rooms in the eras of Orchestral jazz and big band jazz, when bands were large and often augmented by a string section. Large rooms were also more common in the Swing era, because at that time, jazz was popular as a dance music, so the dancers needed space to move. With the transition to 1940s-era styles like Bebop and later styles such as soul jazz, small combos of musicians such as quartets and trios were mostly used, and the music became more of a music to listen to, rather than a form of dance music. As a result, smaller clubs with small stages became practical.

In the 2000s, jazz clubs may be found in the basements of larger residential buildings, in storefront locations or in the upper floors of retail businesses. They can be rather small compared to other music venues, such as rock music clubs, reflecting the intimate atmosphere of jazz shows and long-term decline in popular interest in jazz. Despite being called "clubs", these venues are usually not exclusive. Some clubs, however, have a cover charge if a live band is playing. Some jazz clubs host "jam sessions" after hours or on early evenings of the week. At jam sessions, both professional musicians and advanced amateurs will typically share the stage.

== Austria ==
- Jazzland, Vienna
- Porgy & Bess, Vienna

== Belgium ==
=== Antwerp ===
- Antwerp Jazz Club (AJC)

=== Brussels ===
- Hot Club of Belgium
- Jazz Station
- nl:L'Archiduc

== Canada ==
=== Edmonton ===
- Yardbird Suite

=== Montreal ===
- Dièse Onze
- Upstairs Jazz Bar & Grill

=== Toronto ===
- Colonial Tavern
- George's Spaghetti House
- The Rex Jazz & Blues Bar
- Town Tavern

=== Vancouver ===
- Frankie's Jazz Club

== Czech Republic ==
- AghaRTA Jazz Centrum, Prague
- The Jazz Dock, Prague

== Denmark ==
- Jazzhus Montmartre, Copenhagen

== Estonia ==
- Philly Joe's Jazz Club, Tallinn

== Finland ==
- Storyville, Helsinki

== France ==
=== Paris ===
- Le Baiser Salé
- Le Caveau de la Huchette
- Le Chat Qui Pêche
- Le Duc des Lombards
- New Morning
- Sunset/Sunside

=== Marseille ===
- La Caravelle

== Germany ==
=== Berlin ===
- A-Trane
- B-flat

=== Cologne ===
- The Loft
- Subway

=== Frankfurt ===
- Jazzkeller Frankfurt

=== Hamburg ===
- Birdland
- Mojo Club

=== Mannheim ===
- Ella & Louis Jazz Club

=== Munich ===
- Jazzclub Unterfahrt

=== Stuttgart ===
- BIX Jazzclub

=== Tübingen ===
- Jazz im Prinz Karl

== Israel ==
- Beit HaAmudim, Tel Aviv

== Italy ==
=== Milan ===
- Blue Note

=== Rome ===
- Alexanderplatz
- Casa del Jazz

== Japan ==
- Body & Soul, Tokyo
- Pit Inn, Tokyo
- Slowboat, Sapporo

== Latvia ==
- M/Darbnīca, Riga
- VEF Jazz Club, Riga

== Mexico ==
- Zinco Jazz Club, Mexico City

== Netherlands ==
- Bimhuis, Amsterdam

== Norway ==
- Victoria Nasjonal Jazz Scene, Oslo

== Portugal ==
- Hot Club of Portugal, Lisbon

== Russia ==
- Igor Butman Jazz Club, Moscow & St. Petersburg

== Spain ==
- Jamboree, Barcelona

== Sweden ==
- Fasching, Stockholm

== Switzerland ==
- Marian's Jazz Room, Bern

== Turkey ==
- The Badau, Istanbul
- Nardis Jazz Club, Istanbul
- Shaft, Istanbul

== United Kingdom ==
- The Concorde Club, Eastleigh, Hampshire
- The Jazz Bar, Edinburgh
- Redcar Jazz Club, Redcar

=== Bristol ===
- East Bristol Jazz Club

=== London ===
- 606 Club
- Cafe OTO
- Club Eleven
- Ealing Jazz Club
- Jazz Café
- Le QuecumBar
- Ronnie Scott's Jazz Club
- The Bull's Head (Barnes)
- Vortex Jazz Club
- PizzaExpress Jazz Club

=== Manchester ===
- Band on the Wall
- Matt and Phreds

== United States ==
- Andy's Jazz Club, Chicago, Illinois
- Artists' Quarter, Saint Paul, Minnesota
- Bach Dancing & Dynamite Society, Half Moon Bay, California
- Baker's Keyboard Lounge, Detroit, Michigan
- Birdland, New York City
- Black Cat, San Francisco, California
- Blue Note, New York City
- Blue Whale, Los Angeles
- Blues Alley, Washington, DC
- The Bottom Line, New York City
- Café Bohemia, New York City
- Café Society, New York City
- Carnegie Hall, New York City
- Colored Musicians Club, Buffalo, New York
- Condon's, New York City
- Cotton Club, New York City
- Dakota Jazz Club, Minneapolis, MN
- Dimitriou's Jazz Alley, Seattle
- Five Spot, New York City
- Green Mill Cocktail Lounge, Chicago, Illinois
- The Jazz Kitchen, Indianapolis, Indiana
- Jazz Showcase, Chicago, Illinois
- Kuumbwa Jazz Center, Santa Cruz, California
- Keystone Korner, Baltimore, MD
- Lulu White's Mahogany Hall, Storyville, New Orleans
- Nick's, New York City
- Preservation Hall, French Quarter, New Orleans
- Regal Theater, Chicago, Illinois
- Ryles Jazz Club, Cambridge
- Savoy Ballroom, New York City
- SFJAZZ, San Francisco, California
- Smalls Jazz Club, New York City
- Tipitina's, Uptown, New Orleans
- The Village Gate, New York City
- Village Vanguard, New York City
- Yoshi's, Oakland, California

== See also ==
- Jazz club
- List of jazz festivals
- List of concert halls
- List of contemporary amphitheatres
- List of opera houses
