= Hamdi Makhlouf =

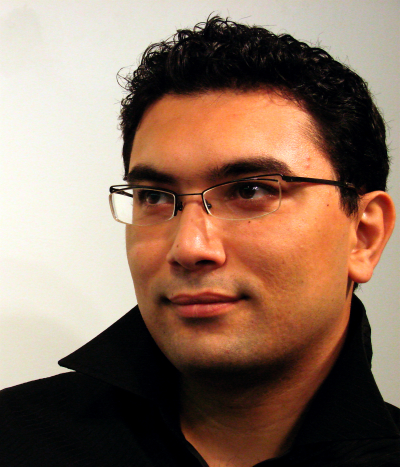

Background information
- Born: 5 June 1980 (age 45); Tunis Kerkennah, Tunisia
- Genres: Jazz; Arabic music World Music
- Occupations: Musician, composer, musicologist researcher
- Years active: 2000–present
- Label: EMI Music – EMI Arabia
- Website: hamdi-makhlouf.com

Hamdi Makhlouf (Arabic: حمدي مخلوف), born on 5 June 1980 in Tunis, an oud player, vocalist, composer and a musicologist. Focusing on jazz and world music, Hamdi Makhlouf researches musical creation and Arabic modern composition.

Since 2007, Hamdi Makhlouf conducts his own projects and composes music for small groups (trio, quartet and quintet). He performed several concerts with professional musicians and jazzmen such as tabla drummer Philippe Foch, pianists Mohamed Ali Kammoun and Vincent Lendower, bassists Saubidet Juan and Leonardo Teruggi, violinist Zied Zouari and drummer Abdesslem Gherbi. These programs were presented during many Festivals such as Musicians from Tunisia, at the palace of Baron d'Erlanger in Sidi Bou Said, in 2008, at the Egyptian Cultural Center in Paris in 2009 and 2010, and at the Instrumental Music week in Tunis in 2010.

== Music ==
Hamdi Makhlouf began studying music from an early age, and continued his musical studies as an option until receiving his baccalaureate in 1999.

In the same year, he joined the Higher Institute of Music in Sfax and began studying music and musicology. Between 1999 and 2003, he continued his course with the oud master Wahid Triki and graduate with an instrumental qualification. During his student life, he composed several solo pieces for oud and interpreted many compositions of oud players including Jamil Bashir, Munir Bashir, Naseer Shamma and Khaled Mohamed Ali. In July 2003 he was awarded the Presidential Prize by the President of Tunisia for achievements in the arts and crafts industry, as well as a scholarship to pursue doctoral studies.

Arriving in France, he began a series of first solo concerts at the Cité Internationale Universitaire de Paris. He met the Tunisian pianist and composer Wajdi Cherif and toured with him in several concerts and festivals between 2004 and 2006, including to the fifth Festival of Music at the Arab World Institute in June 2004, the Tanjazz festival in 2005, the "Couleurs Jazz" Festival held by the Centre for Arab and Mediterranean Music at the palace of Baron d'Erlanger in Sidi Bou Said, Le Baiser Salé and Sunset/Sunside.

In 2011 Maklouf returned as a headline performer to the twelfth Festival of Music, again held at the Arab World Institute.

== Musicology and scientific research ==
Hamdi Makhlouf continued his doctoral thesis at the Paris-Sorbonne University. Since 2006, he has given several lectures at conferences and at the interdisciplinary seminar, the European Congress of Music Analysis at Freiburg im Breisgau on the theme of interpretation in October 2007; at IDEAT, the seminar at the University of Paris 1 Pantheon-Sorbonne and in May 2009, the Interdisciplinary Congress of Musicology in collaboration with the Lebanese musicologist Amine Beyhom

He has published articles in the electronic journal Musimediane published with the assistance of the French Society for Musical Analysis. He also co-edited with the Tunisian musicologist Mondher Ayari a collective book entitled Music, Meaning and Emotion published by Delatour France.

== Discography ==
In 2008, Hamdi Makhlouf recorded Pages nocturnes, an Arabic song inspired by contemporary jazz, which was included in Arabia Nights 4 published by EMI Music, a compilation of several famous artists of the Arab world.

== Collaboration ==
He also participated in several musical projects as a sideman:

- oud player with pianist Wajdi Cherif on his second record Jasmine on Wech Records, which won a "Best CD of 2005" Award from the Indie Acoustic Project in the category of "World Music-Eurasia & Global Beat"
- oud player in the 2009 film Coco starring Gad Elmaleh
- oud player with the American saxophonist Joshua Levitt in his project Lahakah
- vocalist with Amine and Hamza M'raihi in their record Perpetual Motion on Network Medien label
- music arranger, oud player and vocalist with French jazz singer Sultana in his record Mosaïque
