= Le Duc des Lombards =

Jazz club in Paris, France

Coordinates: 48°51′35″N 2°20′55″E

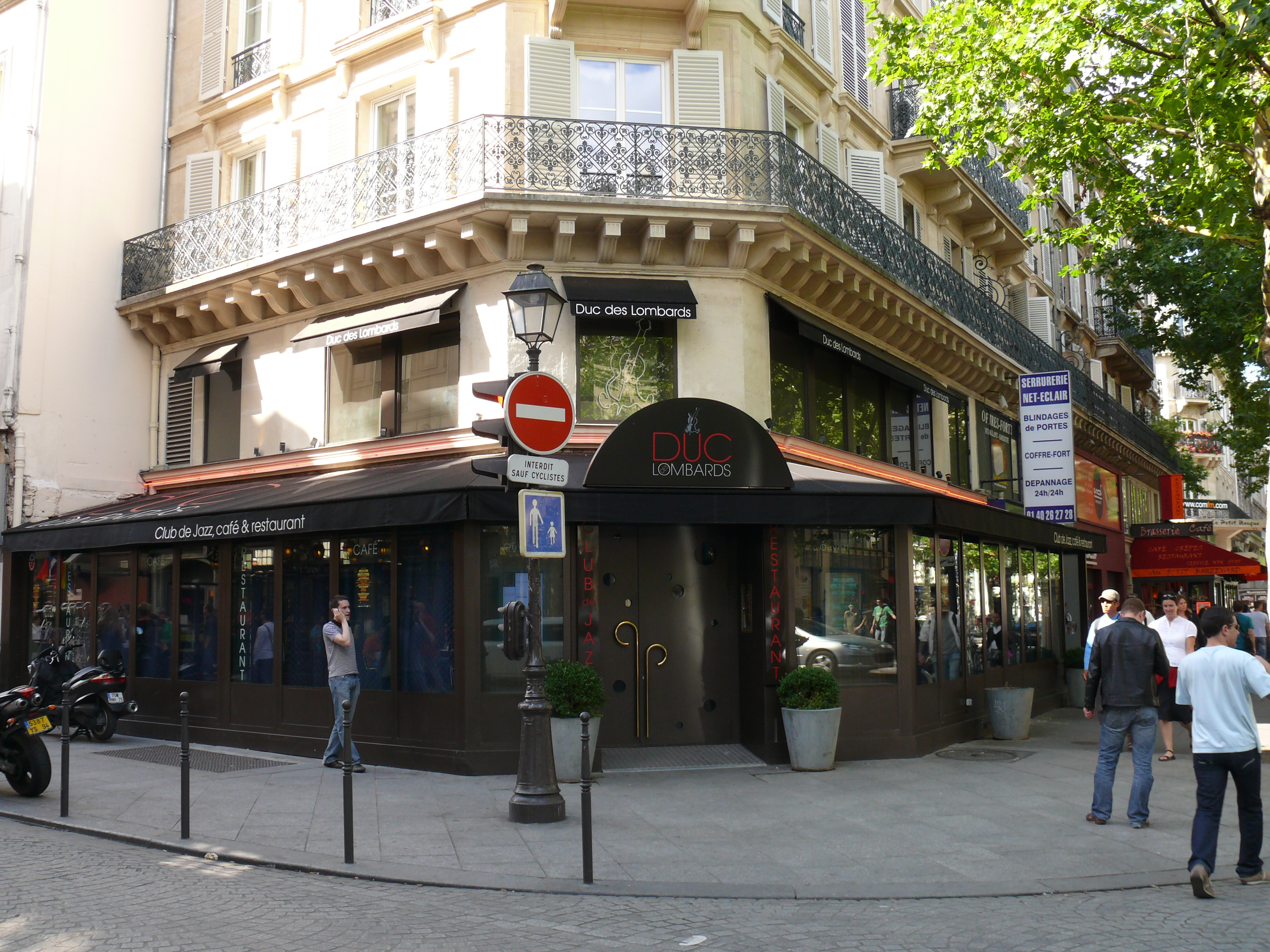
- Interactive map of Le Duc des Lombards
- Location: Paris, France
- Type: Jazz club

Construction
- Opened: 1984

Website
- www.ducdeslombards.fr

Le Duc des Lombards is one of the main jazz clubs in Paris, France. It was founded in 1984 and is in the rue des Lombards, which hosts several other famous jazz clubs including Le Baiser Salé and the Sunset/Sunside. The Duc des Lombards club is located on the corner of rue des Lombards and boulevard de Sébastopol, and was renovated in 2007–08.

== See also ==
- List of jazz clubs
