= Rue des Lombards =

Street in Paris, France

Coordinates: 48°51′33.5″N 2°20′57″E

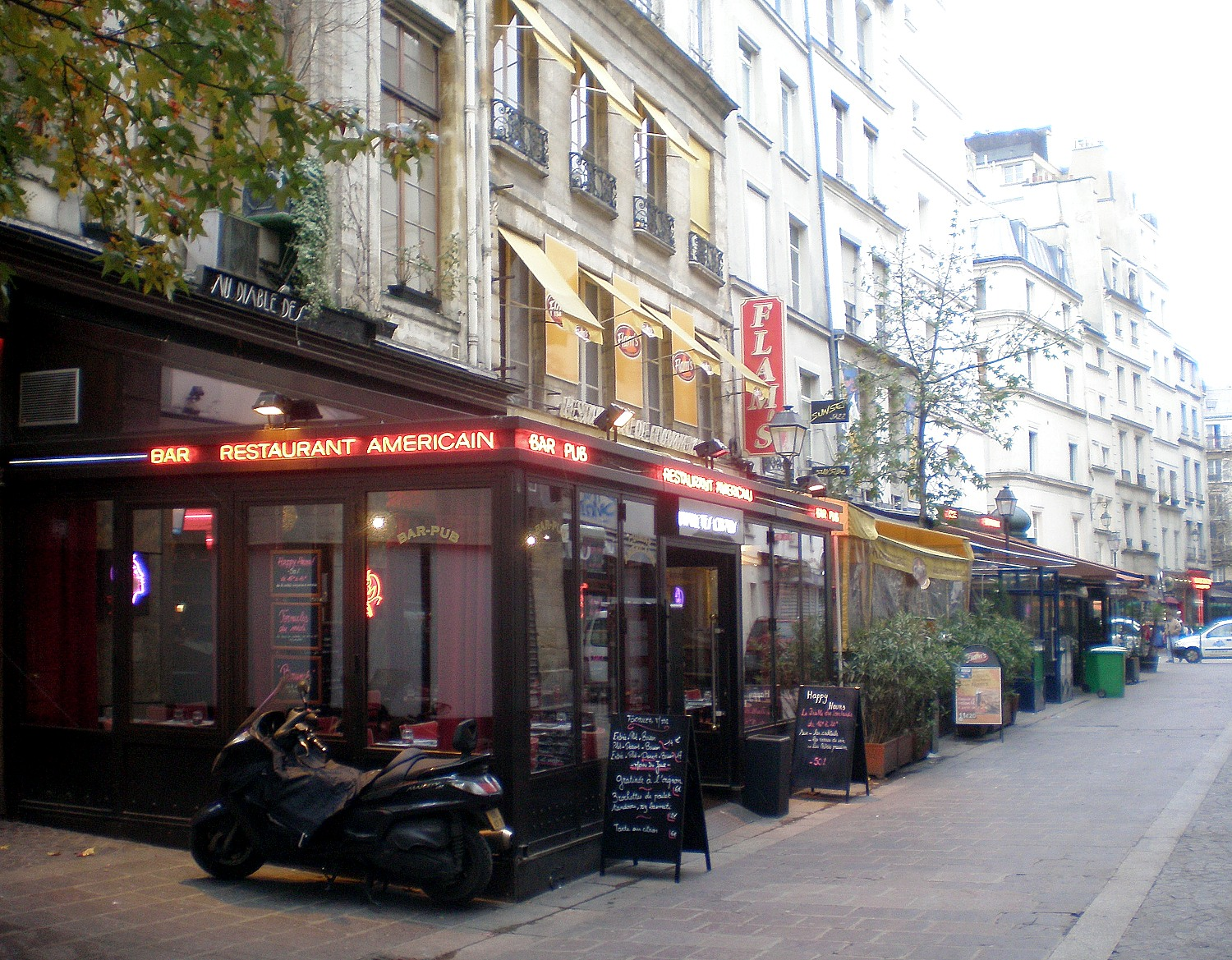
Rue des Lombards

The Rue des Lombards (French pronunciation: [ʁy de lɔ̃baʁ]) is a street in Paris, France, which is famous for hosting three of the main French jazz clubs: Le Baiser Salé, Le Duc des Lombards and the Sunset/Sunside.

== History ==
The earliest record of the Rue des Lombards dates from 1322. Before that, it had been known as the Rue de la Buffeterie.

It was originally a banking center in medieval Paris, a trade dominated by Lombard merchants, name given from the 12th century onwards to Italian merchants and bankers.

== In popular culture ==
It was also shown on The Simpsons episode "To Courier with Love".
