= Mike Smith (jazz saxophonist) =

American jazz saxophonist (born 1957)

- Smith at Ronnie Scott's Jazz Club in 2012

Background information
- Born: Michael Smith; March 3, 1957 (age 69)
- Origin: Chicago, Illinois, U.S.
- Genre: Jazz
- Occupation: Musician
- Instruments: Alto saxophone; soprano saxophone; baritone saxophone
- Years active: 1980s–present
- Labels: Delmark; Fastrax; Underground Labs
- Formerly of: Maynard Ferguson; Buddy Rich; Frank Sinatra; Frank Sinatra Jr.
- Education: University of North Texas
- Website: www.mikesmithsaxophone.com

Michael Smith (born March 3, 1957) is an American jazz saxophonist who has released albums as leader on Delmark Records, as well as on his own labels, Fastrax and Underground Labs.

== Biography ==
Smith attended the University of North Texas, where he studied with Jim Riggs and was a member of the One O'Clock Lab Band. He graduated in 1980.

That same year, in 1980, he moved to Chicago. In the early part of the decade, he toured with the Maynard Ferguson and Buddy Rich bands. In these groups, he played the alto, soprano, and baritone saxophones, While he was with Buddy Rich, he toured with Frank Sinatra. From 1981, he worked for both Frank Sinatra and Frank Sinatra Jr. as a featured saxophonist and music contractor. In 1985, he won a National Endowment for the Arts award. In 1993, he won the Cannonball Adderley Award for alto saxophone.

He has recorded and performed with Tony Bennett, Harry Connick Jr., Nancy Wilson, Art Farmer, and Nat Adderley, among others.

Smith has held a weekly spot at Andy's Jazz Club in Chicago for over thirty years. Currently, he is professor of saxophone at Roosevelt University, Chicago College of Performing Arts. In addition, he is a clinician and performing artist for Silver Eagle Saxophones and Rico Reeds. Smith was on the design team for the Verne Q. Powell Group, working with Chris French and John Weir, who planned to build and produce an American-made saxophone in Elkhart, Indiana, named "The Silver Eagle".

== Discography ==
=== As leader ===
- Unit 7 (Delmark, 1990)
- On a Cool Night (Delmark, 1992)
- The Traveller (Delmark, 1993)
- Sinatra Songbook (Delmark, 1995)
- Ballads (Fastrax, 1997)
- Mike Smith Quintet (Fastrax, 2004)
- Mike Smith Quartet (Fastrax, 2006)
- Grand Central (Fastrax, 2008)
- Live at Andy's (Fastrax, 2012)
- Homecoming (Fastrax, 2012)
- Live at Andy's, Mike Smith 30th Anniversary (Fastrax, 2012)
