= Ikseon-dong =

Neighborhood of Seoul, South Korea

- Hangul: 익선동
- Hanja: 益善洞
- RR: Ikseon-dong
- MR: Iksŏn-dong

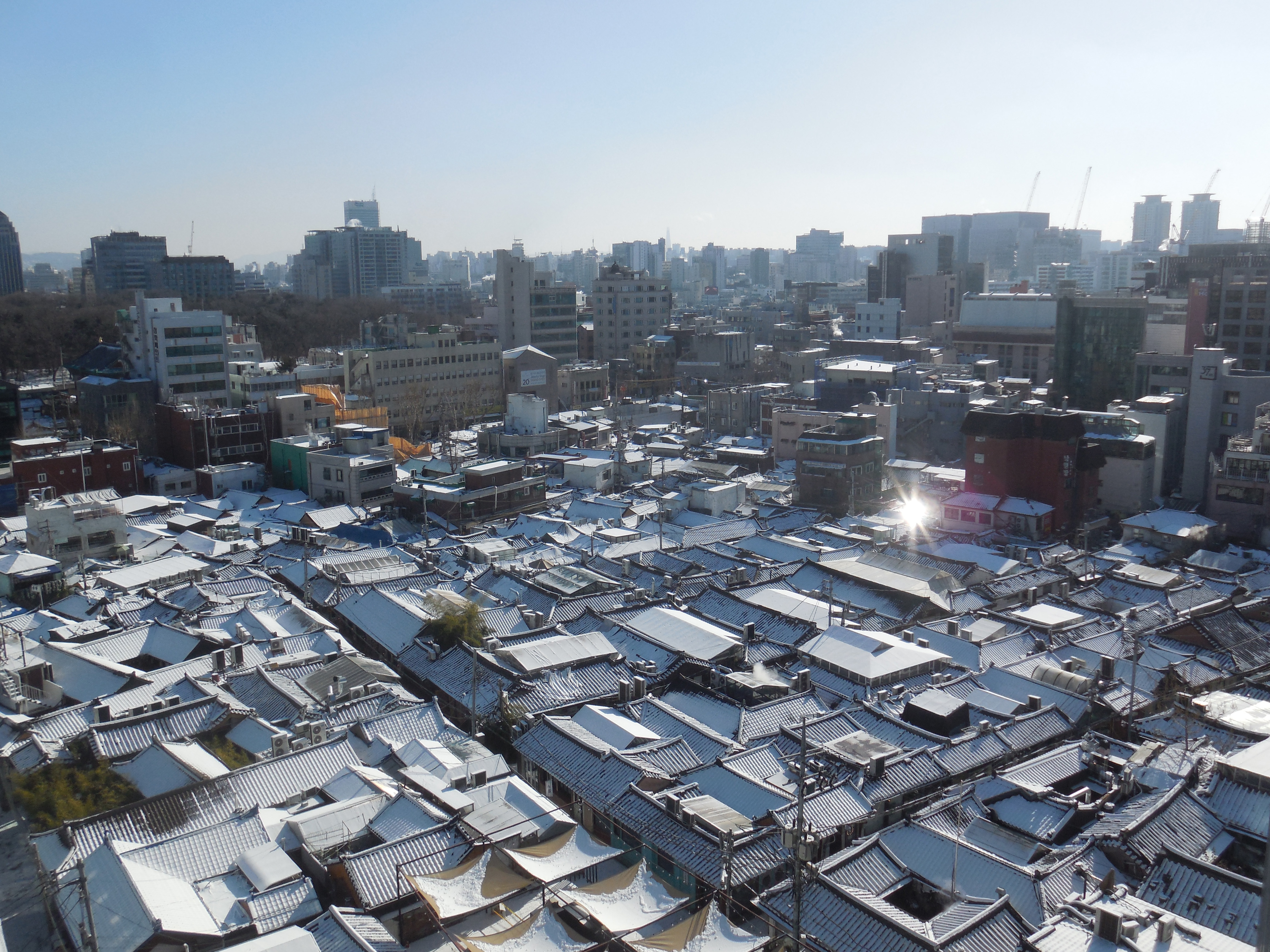
Snowy scenery of Ikseon-dong. Photographed in 2021.

Ikseon-dong (Korean: 익선동) is a legal-status dong located in the center of Jongno 1·2·3·4-ga-dong, Jongno-gu, Seoul. It borders Unni-dong to the north, Donui-dong to the south, Nagwon-dong to the west, and Yaryong-dong and Myo-dong to the east. Transportation is convenient thanks to the nearby Samil-daero and Donhwamun-ro, and Jongno 3-ga station on the subway. Within the dong are the Jongno 1·2·3·4-ga-dong Community Center and the 'Uri Sori Library', among other facilities. As of 2020, the population is around 1,000.

Ikseon-dong is famous for its hanok (traditional Korean house) village built from the 1920s onwards, and remains one of the oldest concentrated hanok districts in Seoul. During the Japanese colonial period, many artists lived here, including female pansori singers. After liberation, people from various social strata coexisted. Ikseon-dong, which once thrived on gisaeng restaurant (yojeong) tourism before declining, became a home for sexual minorities in the latter half of the 20th century, and has been a tourist attraction since the mid-2010s. Since the late 2010s, the neighborhood has been undergoing gentrification, causing rapid changes and criticism that its unique identity is being lost.

== Name origin ==
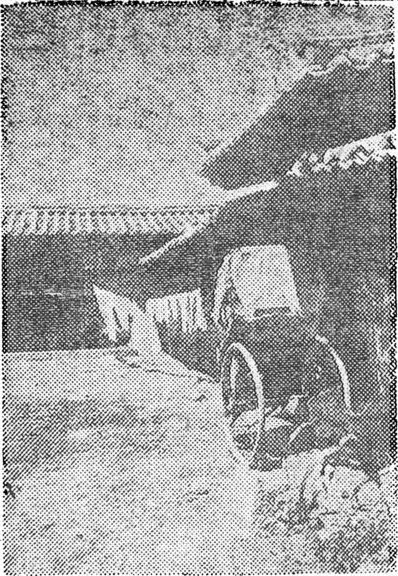
Nudong Palace, from which Ikseon-dong takes its name (1924).

The name Ikseon-dong first appeared during the administrative reorganization of April 1, 1914. At the time, it was formed by merging parts of Gunggong, Ikdong, Donneyong-dong, Nidong, and Handong of the Jeongson-bang (貞善坊), Donneyong-gye (敦寧契) in Jungbu, Gyeongseong-bu. The name combines '선 (善)' from Jeongson-bang and '익 (益)' from Ikdong. Ikdong itself derived its name from the wing corridors (翼廊, iknang) of Nudong Palace, which was famous for its long row of wing corridors known as 'julhaengnang'. The surrounding area came to be called Iknang-gol (翼廊―), which was shortened to Ikdong.

== History ==
=== Goryeo period ===
Gyodong (校洞) in Jungbu, Hanseongbu, Joseon, covered the area that is now Gyeongwun-dong, Nagwon-dong, Jongno 2-ga, and Jongno 3-ga. Honorary Professor Choe Jong-hyeon of Hanyang University's Department of Urban Engineering inferred from a record in which Yi Bang-won (Taejong) ordered "build a secondary palace (Changdeokgung) on the land east of Hyanggyodong" that Gyodong was already a large village in the early Joseon period, large enough to be deliberately avoided when constructing palaces. (Note: The place name 'Gyodong' is commonly given to places where a hyanggyo (local Confucian school) is located, and hyanggyo are situated at the center of a region.) Furthermore, considering that Jongno, Donhwamun-ro, and the flanking Pimagil were roads laid out in straight lines during the Joseon period, he concluded that the diagonal alleys intersecting these roads must have existed from the preceding Goryeo period. One trace of this is Donhwamun-ro 11na-gil, which runs north–south through Ikseon-dong; in the Goryeo period this alley was the Geumwiyeong Stream, with a path running along the left bank of the stream.

=== Joseon period ===
Ikseon-dong contained the Donneyong-bu and Nudong Palace. Donneyong-bu was the government office that managed the king's relatives who did not belong to the Jongchinbu. Nudong Palace was the residence of the descendants of Jeon-gye Daewogun. Cheoljong was born in a house on the site of Nudong Palace, and after ascending to the throne, he built a new house on his former homesite for his elder brother, Yeongpyeong-gun Yi Gyeong-eung, to live in. That house is Nudong Palace. Within Nudong Palace was Jeon-gye Palace, a shrine enshrining three figures: Jeon-gye Daewogun, Wanyang Budaebuuin Choe, and Yongseong Budaebuuin Yeom.

Originally, this area belonged to Jeongson-bang (貞善坊). The Dongguk Yeoji Bigo records that under Jeongson-bang were the sub-districts of Birojeon-gye, Imgisonson-gye, Gimmannyeon-gye, Sumundong-gye, Gobyeongjo-gye, Donneyong-bu Sang-gye (敦寧府上契), Donneyong-bu Ha-gye, Pajajeon-gye, Hamijeon-gye, Daemyodong-gye, Uijeon 1-gye, and Uijeon 2-gye, of which Ikseon-dong corresponds to part of the Donneyong-bu gye. The Yukjeon jorye records that under Jeongson-bang were Daemyodong-gye, Uijeon 1-gye, 2-gye, Hamijeon-gye, Pojeon-gye (布廛契), Sumundong-gye, Gimmannyeon-gye, Imgisonson-gye, Birojeon-gye, Gobyeongjo-gye, Donneyong Sang-gye, Ha-gye, and Pajajeon-gye, of which Ikseon-dong corresponds to part of Donneyong-gye.

Following the Gabo Reform, the five bu were abolished and five seo (署) were established. At that time, the sub-administrative units of Jeongson-bang in Jungbu (中署) were as follows. In the late Joseon period, a dong (洞) was a unit of residents' living space based on alleys; a single dong did not necessarily correspond to a single bang (坊) or gye (契), and could belong to multiple bang or gye.

Bang	Gye	Dong
Jeongson-bang	Daemyodong-gye (大廟洞契)	Myodong (廟洞), Hamyodong (下廟洞), Taejeongdong (太井洞)
Jeongson-bang	Gimmannyeon-gye (金萬年契)	Daemyodong (大廟洞), Madong (麻洞), Nudong (樓洞)
Jeongson-bang Donggu (洞口)	Seungmun-gye (承文契)	Seungmundong (承文洞)
Jeongson-bang Donggu (洞口)	Imgisonson-gye (林己孫契)	Madong (麻洞), Nudong (樓洞)
Jeongson-bang Donggu (洞口)	Eouigung-gye (於義宮契)	Eouuidong (於義洞)
Jeongson-bang Donggu (洞口)	Donneyong-gye (敦寧契)	Donneyongdong (敦寧洞), Jangdaejangdong (張大將洞), Handong (漢洞), Nudong (樓洞), Ikdong (益洞), Gungdong (宮洞), Nidong (泥洞), Seungmundong (承文洞)
Jeongson-bang Donggu (洞口)	Nongpo-gye (農圃契)	Nongpodong (農圃洞), Sumundong (水門洞)
Jeongson-bang Donggu (洞口)	Gubyeongjo-gye (舊兵曹契)	Nidong (泥洞)

=== Japanese colonial period ===
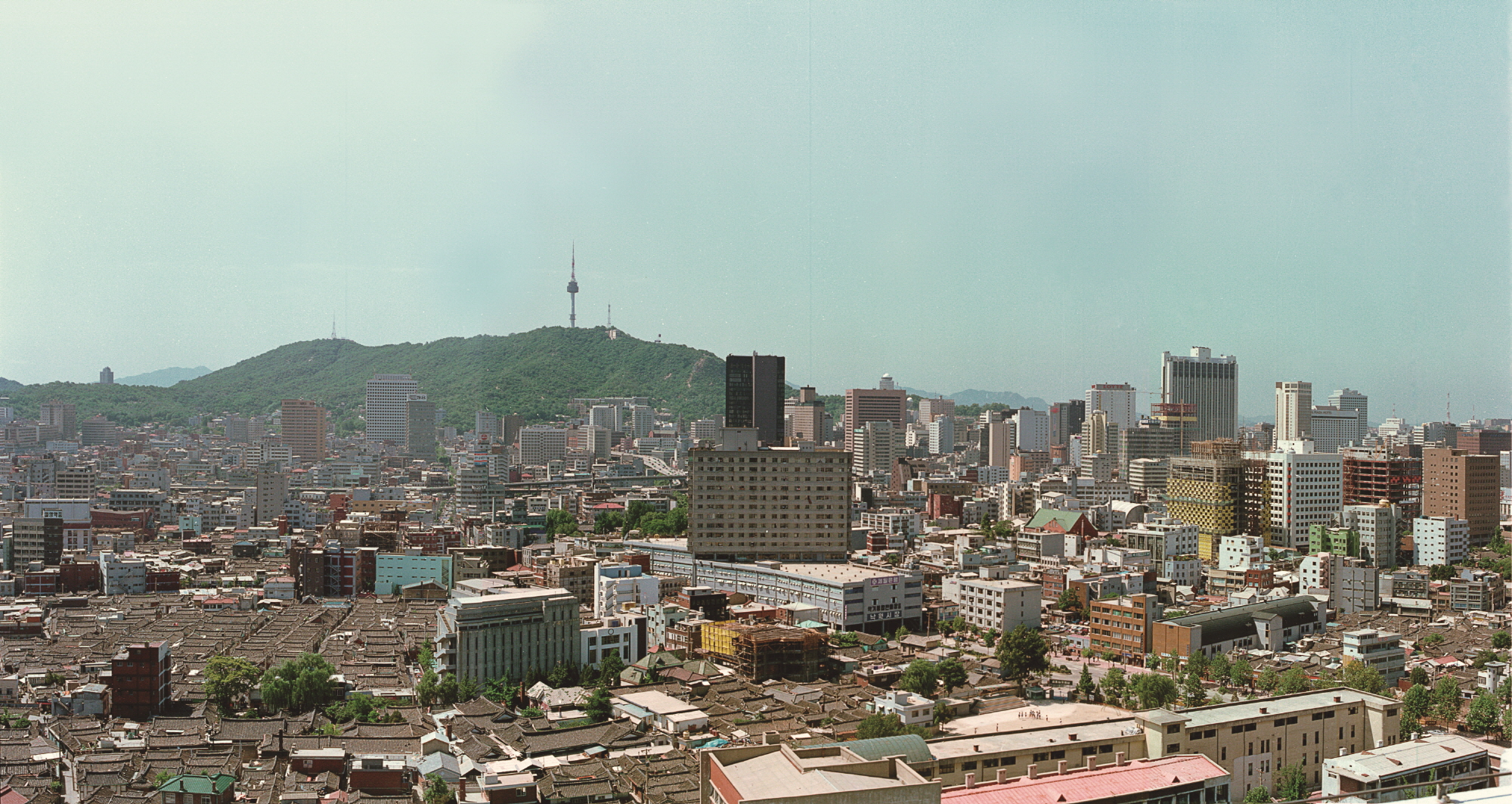
The systematically developed Ikseon-dong hanok district is clearly visible in the lower left.

In 1914, the Japanese colonial government reorganized the existing dong of Gyeongseong-bu by dissolving and merging them into new jeong (町) and dong. Around 1921, Samil-daero 30-gil, which cuts east–west through the center of Ikseon-dong, was opened. Around this time, Min Yeong-chan also lived in Ikseon-dong. The former private residence of Wanhwa-gun, known as Wanhwa Palace (完和宮), was also in Ikseon-dong; an educational facility called Bando Women's Academy (半島女子學院) was later established there.

From the late 1920s to the early 1930s, Ikseon-dong was developed into a hanok district by real estate developer Jeong Se-gwon. As Japanese settlers living south of Cheonggyecheon in Namchon began expanding northward into areas predominantly populated by Koreans in the 1920s, Jeong Se-gwon countered this by building hanok communities for Koreans in Bukchon, Ikseon-dong, Bongik-dong, Chebu-dong, Changshin-dong, and other areas. He typically purchased a large hanok estate, demolished it, and built numerous small hanok tightly packed together. In Ikseon-dong, he developed lot 33 (formerly Wanhwa Palace) in 1929, and lots 166, 33-16, and 19 (formerly Nudong Palace) the following year. Meanwhile, the last owner of Nudong Palace, Yi Hae-seung, sold the palace and used the proceeds to buy land in Hongeun-dong; in 1988, his grandson Yi U-yeong built a hotel there.

Many artists also lived in Ikseon-dong. The homes of Hong Myeong-hui (known as the 'Palheongmun house'), Kim Eok, Park Jin, Yi Gi-yeong, and Yi Hae-jo were all located here. The house of calligrapher and painter Kim Yong-jin and Yi Byeong-jik later became the gisaeng restaurant Ojin-am. Famous pansori singer Kim Cho-hyang also lived in Ikseon-dong, and in 1931 donated her home to serve as the office of the Joseon Music Association. In 1937, Kim Jong-ik purchased a house in Ikseon-dong and gave it to the Joseon Classical Music Research Society (조선성악연구회), the successor to the Joseon Music Association, for use by Song Man-gap and Park Rok-ju as well. This house was at lot 159 in Ikseon-dong; by 1994, the society's office rooms and the rooms used by the masters had already been demolished, leaving only the hanok where they practiced, which at the time was being used as a restaurant called 'Hanok'. According to Park Rok-ju's 1974 memoir, Kim Jong-ik also bought a home for her in 1937; in her later years, Park Rok-ju lived in a hanok at 21-4 Donui-dong, separated from Ikseon-dong by a single alley.

=== Post-liberation 20th century ===
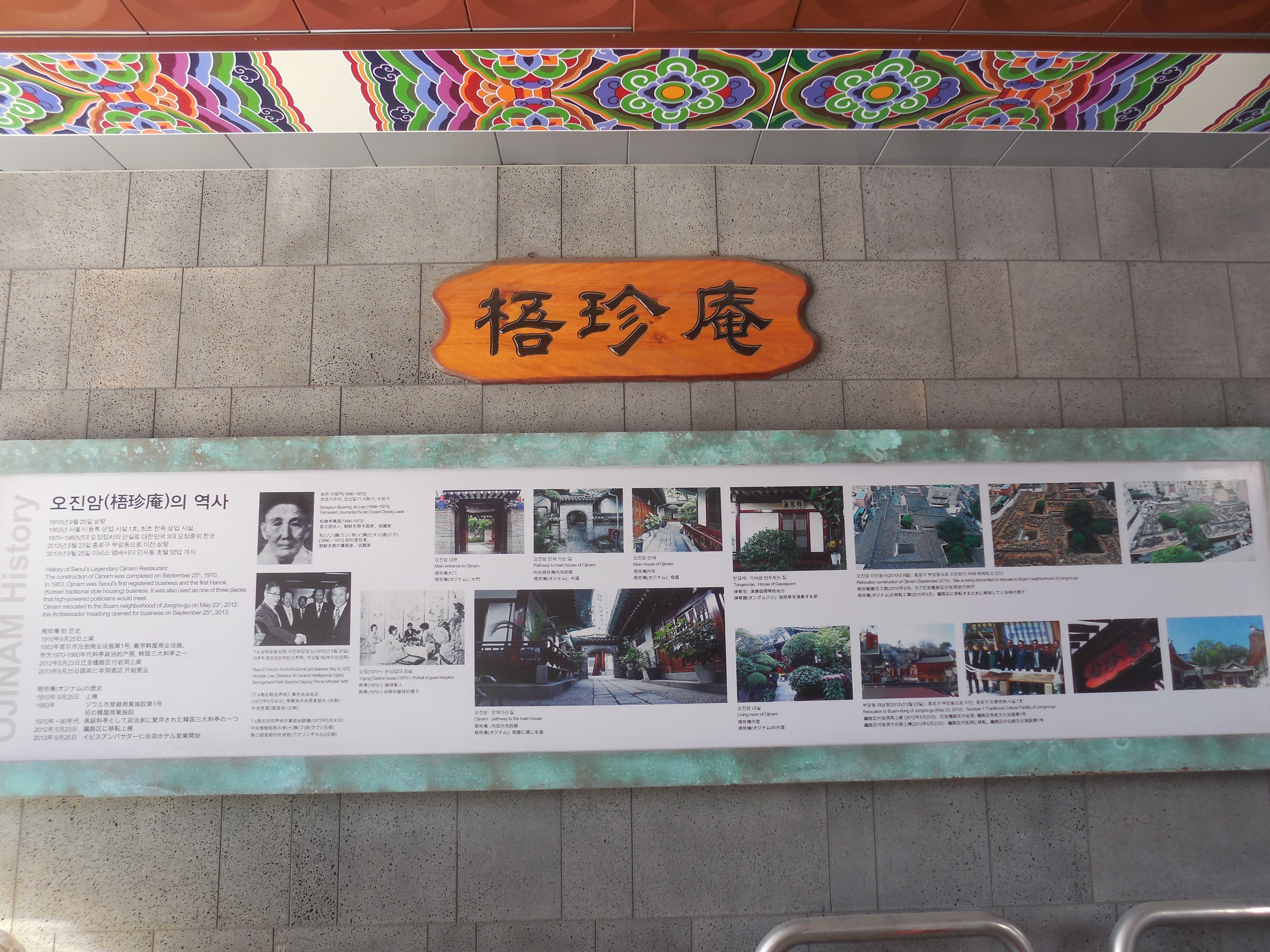
Historical plaque of Ojin-am.

According to testimony from Ikseon-dong residents, the neighborhood in the 1960s–70s had prominent figures living north of Samil-daero 30-gil, working-class residents around lot 166, and a working-class entertainment district to the south. Gisaeng restaurants (yojeong) were scattered throughout Ikseon-dong; as of December 1969, the three highest tax-paying establishments in Seoul—Ojin-am (monthly ₩1.23 million), Okryujang (monthly ₩1.02 million), and Daeha—were all located in Ikseon-dong. Among these, Ojin-am (梧珍庵) was a yojeong established around 1953 in a 700-pyeong hanok built in the early 1900s. In 1972, Yi Hu-rak and Pak Seong-cheol held discussions there that led to the July 4th North–South Joint Statement, and it was frequently visited by political and business figures; along with Samcheongak and Daewon-gak, it was famous as one of the centers of yojeong politics in the 1970s–80s. At its peak, it employed some 70–80 staff and received the same number of guests per day. The influence of this yojeong culture is why hanbok shops and fortune-telling shops still remain in Ikseon-dong today. However, from the 1980s onwards, the wealthy began moving to Gangnam, and as the working class saw their children leave home, the elderly predominantly remained in Ikseon-dong. Between the houses were metalworking workshops supplying the jewelry district along Jongno 3-ga, and hanbok sewing workshops producing wedding trousseau items.

Meanwhile, from just after liberation, a large red-light district called Jongsam (鍾三) had existed from Tapgol Park to Jongno 5-ga; it was entirely eliminated between September and October 1968 in an operation called 'Nabi Jakjeon' (Butterfly Operation) under Seoul Mayor Kim Hyeon-ok. After Jongsam was dissolved, the spaces formerly used as brothels became vacant, and by the late 1970s gay bars began opening around Pagoda Theater, forming an LGBT community spanning Nagwon-dong, Ikseon-dong, and Donui-dong. Gay men who had been gathering in Sindang-dong and Euljiro since the 1960s migrated to the Nagwon-dong area after the Seongdong Theater in Sindang-dong closed in the early 1990s, and men in their 20s–30s who had begun gathering in Itaewon around the same time also moved to this area in the 2000s as gay venues there declined.

=== 21st century ===
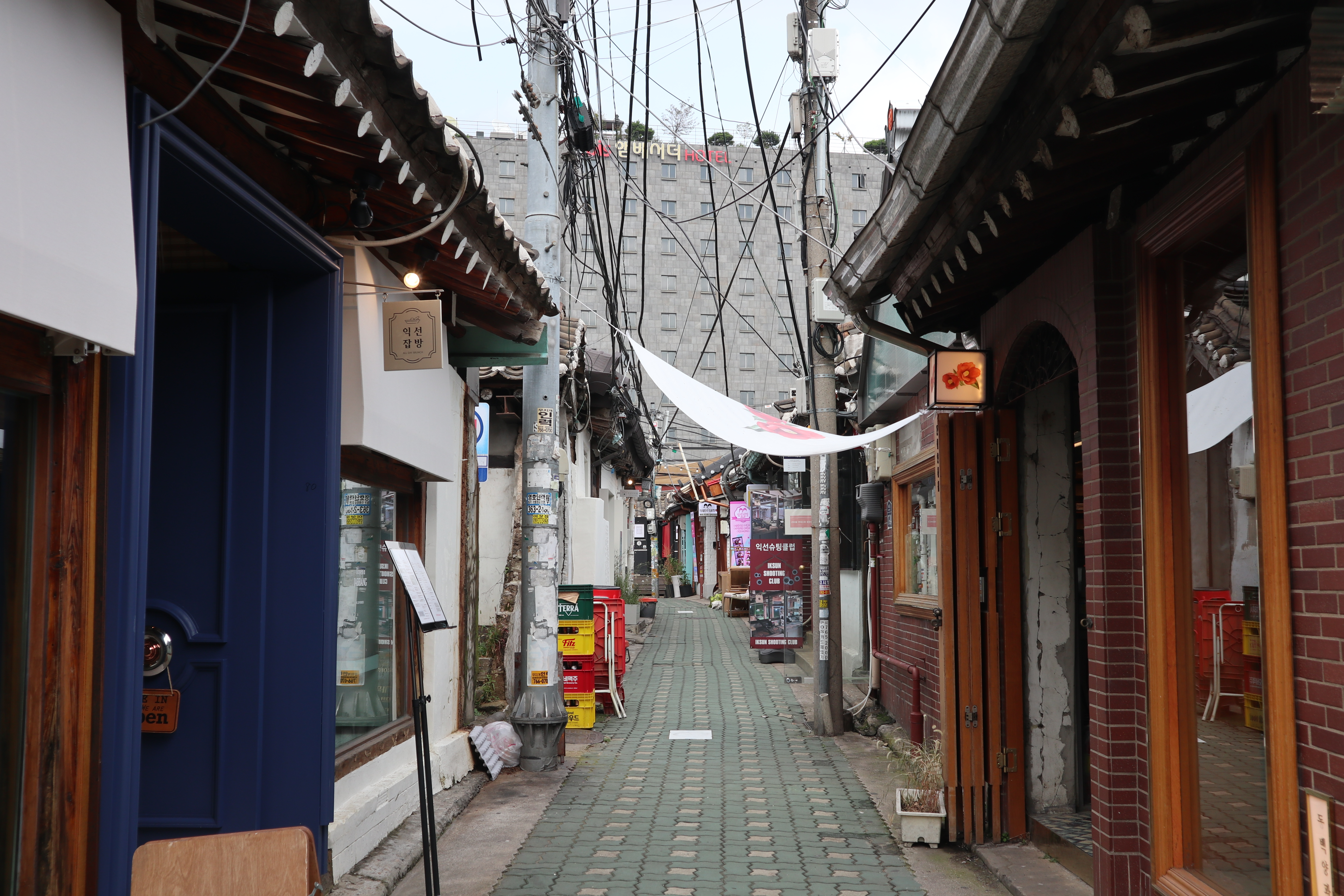
An alley in Ikseon-dong where modern businesses occupy traditional hanok.

Despite its central urban location, Ikseon-dong retained its hanok and aged houses built in the modern era until the late 1990s. In 1997, 63% of residents supported redevelopment, and in 1999 redevelopment was blocked once due to hanok preservation concerns, but parts of Ikseon-dong were partially developed with officetel buildings. In the meantime, Jongno-gu Office pursued full-scale redevelopment of Ikseon-dong, and on May 6, 2004, an area of 31,121.5 m² around lot 165 was designated the Ikseon Urban Environment Improvement Zone. The residents pushing for development planned to build five-story commercial buildings adjacent to Donhwamun-ro and, further inside, 13–14-story officetels, hotels, and apartments; the Seoul Metropolitan City Urban Planning Committee, noting the proximity to Insadong, recommended that traditional Korean elements be incorporated into the architecture.

In December 2008, Seoul Metropolitan Government proposed a plan to preserve hanok in the concentrated hanok areas of Chebu-dong, Myeongnyun-dong, Sajik-dong, and Ikseon-dong while guiding developers to preserve some hanok when developing dense hanok areas, and in 2010, the Seoul Urban Planning Committee rejected the Ikseon-dong redevelopment plan on grounds of hanok preservation. Subsequently, in March 2013, 52% of residents voted in favor and the redevelopment promotion committee was dissolved; in July 2014 a request was filed to lift the urban environment improvement zone designation, but three months later the urban planning committee expressed concern about unregulated development following dedesignation. As Seoul Metropolitan Government moved to establish a district unit plan as a countermeasure, conflicting interests and an administrative vacuum caused Ikseon-dong to begin changing rapidly. Cafés, bars, and other establishments unrelated to residents' daily life began appearing from late 2014 to early 2015 around Supyo-ro 28-gil 17-beon (the former Nudong-gung 1-gil), known as the 'Jungang-ro', and Ikseon-dong began commercializing; businesses with newly renovated interiors inside traditional hanok exteriors opened one after another, and the area became popular as a tourist destination in the heart of the city. On May 10, 2018, the urban environment improvement zone was lifted, and simultaneously the Ikseon District Unit Plan Zone was designated to preserve the area's historical character and place identity.

Meanwhile, Ojin-am, the last remaining yojeong in Ikseon-dong, changed hands multiple times, struggled financially from 2006, and finally closed at the end of July 2010 due to the owner's health issues. Ojin-am was demolished in September 2010, and on its site the Ibis Ambassador Seoul Insadong hotel opened on October 25, 2013. Jongno-gu Office opened the Mugyewon (武溪園) cultural space at the Mugyejeongsa site in Buam-dong, incorporating some materials from Ojin-am, on March 20, 2014, and the Seoul Museum of History holds the original signboard of Ojin-am in its collection. As foot traffic in Ikseon-dong increased, hotels have been established in Ikseon-dong and its surroundings even after the Ibis hotel, attracting tourists.

== Culture ==
=== Tourism ===
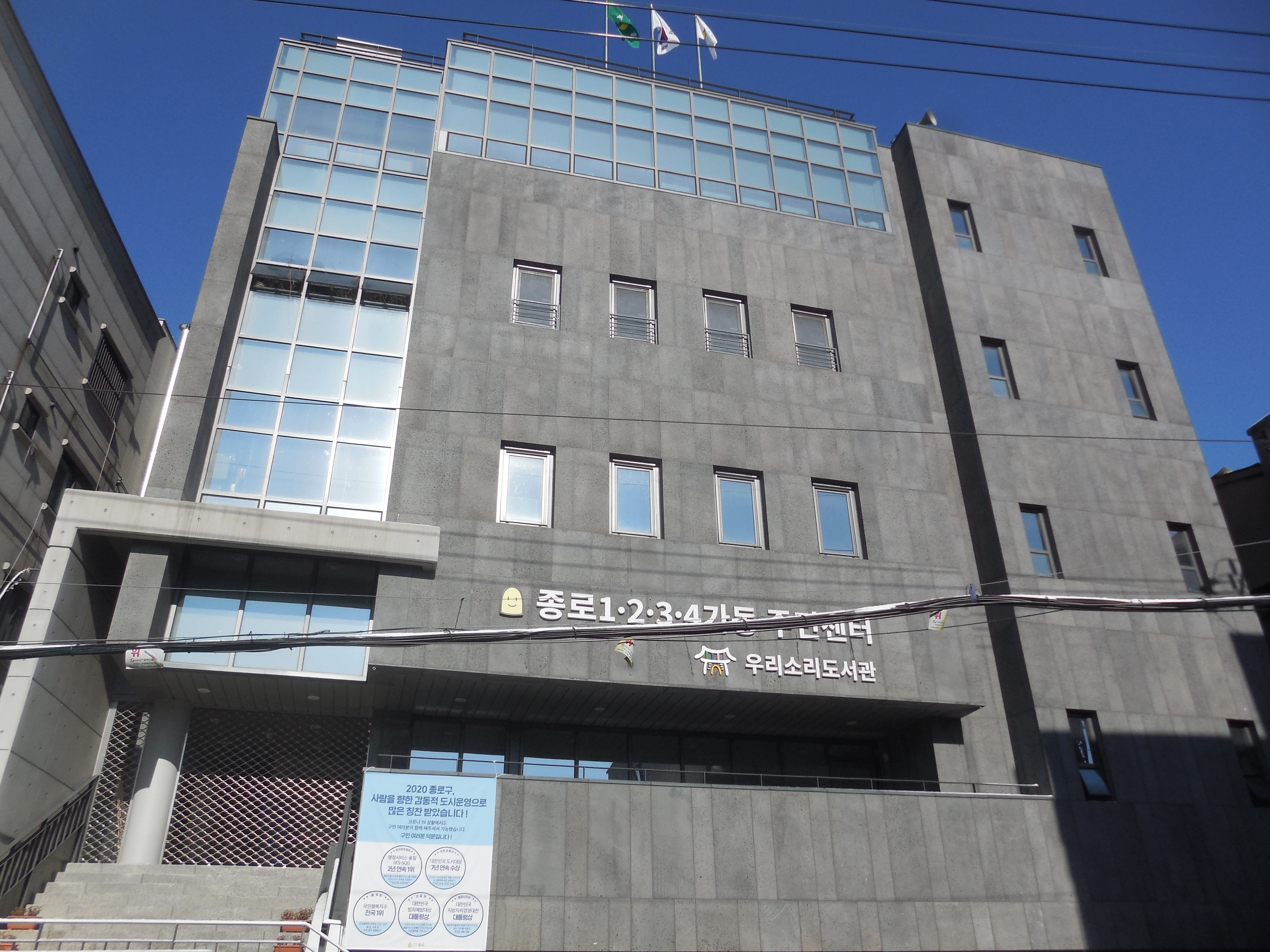
The Jongno 1·2·3·4-ga-dong Community Center and Uri Sori Library, built on the former site of the yojeong Dowon.

During the Japanese colonial period, gisaeng belonging to gwonbeon (gisaeng registries) lived in the area around Donhwamun that included Ikseon-dong. Gisaeng of Hannam Gwonbeon (漢南券番)—including Hyeon Gye-ok, Kim Nok-ju (金綠珠), Kim Nam-su (金南洙), and Park Rok-ju, all from the southern provinces—performed pansori and changgeuk, nurturing female pansori performers. The Yi Wang-jik Aak Department, the successor of Jangakwon and predecessor of the National Gugak Center, was located in the nearby Unni-dong from 1926, and gugak performances were held at its Ilsodang (佾韶堂); the masters had to practice pansori wrapped in winter quilts even in midsummer because the tightly packed houses in the narrow alleys provided no soundproofing, as tradition has it.

After liberation, Ikseon-dong was home to first-class gisaeng (一牌妓生) who transmitted and performed gugak, as well as second-class gisaeng (二牌妓生, or eungeunjja) who engaged in clandestine prostitution. Yojeong including Ojin-am (established 1953), Daeha, Myeongwol, Cheongpung (→Dowon), and the still-operating traditional Korean restaurant Songam (淞庵) took up residence in Ikseon-dong. The yojeong of Ikseon-dong entered their heyday in the early 1970s as gwangwang (tourism) yojeong culture flourished. Ojin-am, frequently visited by Japanese tourists, was designated one of 12 gwangwang yojeong licensed to serve foreigners in October 1972, and was also a venue for gugak performances. Traces of gugak remain today: the granddaughter of the famous singer Im Bang-ul, Im Hyang-nim, established a pansori research institute in Ikseon-dong, and the Jongno 1·2·3·4-ga-dong Community Center, which relocated to Ikseon-dong, opened the Uri Sori Library on its 4th and 5th floors on December 14, 2017.

In the 1990s, yojeong culture declined due to growing overseas tourism demand, the introduction of the real-name financial transaction system, and the rise of competing room salons, but tourists began to take notice of Ikseon-dong for preserving the feel of a 'lived-in alley' without the commercialization seen in nearby Bukchon or Seochon. The first shop opened in the inner alleys of Ikseon-dong by an outsider was a traditional tea house called 'Deul-an'; its owner recalled that "(in January 2009) when I opened the tea house, there was no one here." Deul-an was also a filming location for the Korean-Japanese co-production Café Seoul (2010). Director Takemasa Haru (武正晴) said he was inspired by Ikseon-dong's hanok alleys and the similarities between Korean tteok and Japanese mochi. Many Japanese tourists visited Deul-an following the film, which starred idol group UN's Kim Jeong-hun, leaving photographs, letters, and gifts at the tea house, which appeared in the film as a rice cake shop called 'Morandan'. Beyond that, Deul-an was occasionally visited by those studying architecture or history, and served as a gathering place for residents discovering and studying Ikseon-dong's value. Until early 2014, Deul-an was the only shop in Ikseon-dong opened by an outsider.

From late 2014, shops by young artists and entrepreneurs—such as the café 'Sikmul' (Note: Also a filming location for the film Worst Day (2016).) and the gama (corner store–bar) 'Geobukisyupeo'—appeared and gained attention through social media, triggering Ikseon-dong's commercialization. Ikseon-dong was featured in Documentary 3 Days in February 2016, after which it became widely known; from 2016 to 2019, arcades, comic book shops, Western-style restaurants, and shops renting Enlightenment-era clothing, all renovated to preserve the hanok appearance, opened there, and within just a few years the neighborhood lost its quiet ambiance. With the 'newtro' (new + retro) trend—blending nostalgia with contemporary sensibility—sweeping through those in their 20s and 30s from the late 2010s, Ikseon-dong became known as a newtro hub alongside Euljiro and Hongdae. The commercialization and expansion of Ikseon-dong resulted in its inclusion in the Korea Tourism 100 (2019–2020) published biennially by the Ministry of Culture, Sports and Tourism and the Korea Tourism Organization, but also brought gentrification issues. In 2017, the Korea Research Institute for Human Settlements reported that rents in Ikseon-dong had quadrupled over six years, rising 50% year-on-year in 2017 alone, placing Ikseon-dong in Stage 3 of four stages of gentrification—characterized by rising rents and deepening commercialization.

=== Hanok ===
As of January 2018, there are 119 hanok in Ikseon-dong, of which 37 are residential. By zone: north of Samil-daero 30-gil in lot 33, surveys found 87 hanok out of 169 buildings in 2006 and 53 out of 159 in 2014; south of that in lot 166, surveys found 200 hanok out of 248 buildings in 2006 and 181 out of 243 in 2014, (Note: Both the 2006 and 2014 surveys included parts of Gyeongwun-dong, Nagwon-dong, and Donui-dong within their survey areas.) indicating a declining trend.

The area widely known as Ikseon-dong's hanok village is lot 166. Lot 166 (2,574 pyeong), formerly Nudong Palace, was owned by Yi Hae-seung; on December 9, 1920, it was subdivided as lot 166-2 (2,574 pyeong), with ownership transferred to Park Yeong-hyo and two others, and on September 30, 1929, it was further subdivided as lot 166-5 (2,428.9 pyeong), with ownership transferred to Changdeokgung. During the September 1929 lot subdivision and ownership transfer process, a price difference of approximately 7,000 won was realized, helping Yi Hae-seung repay his debts. On August 20, 1930, lot 166-5 was subdivided into lots 166-14 through 166-60; lot 166-52 (735.6 pyeong) comprised an undivided large plot and four straight north–south alleys, while the remainder was subdivided into plots each large enough for a single house. Lot 166-52 was subdivided in four stages between November 14, 1930 and December 21 of the following year into lots 166-65 through 166-84. Subdividing a lot in the north–south direction allows more houses to be arranged than an east–west split, minimizes the distance from the gate to each unit when side rooms or outbuildings were rented out, and gives each unit the advantage of easier privacy.

Jeong Se-gwon became involved in development at the stage when lots 166-14 through 166-60 had already been subdivided. For this reason, the eastern section of lot 166, where Jeong Se-gwon could not take the lead, has an average lot area of 53.1 pyeong, relatively large; but in the western section subdivided from lot 166-52, Jeong's intention to supply as many houses as possible is reflected in an average lot area of just 21.7 pyeong. The hanok here follow a basic four-room 'module' of kitchen–master room–floor (maru)–guest room; depending on the presence of outbuildings, this module takes an L-shape (ㄷ) or U-shape (ㅁ). The master room and guest room have underfloor heating (ondol). The reason for this module configuration is that these elements are considered essential to any hanok regardless of time and place, and the reason for the angled forms is the desire to fit as many houses as possible on narrow land. Most roofs were gable (맞배) style. Two buildings were constructed in the jungdang-sik (中堂式, central-hall) style, with rooms arrayed around a central living room; they were designed with the living room and rooms (except the kitchen) facing south for maximum sunlight, and the entire space under the roof was made into an attic to secure generous storage. (Note: The jungdang-sik hanok is the opposite of the traditional jungjeong-sik (中庭式, central-courtyard) hanok, which arranges rooms around a courtyard; here the building occupies the center and open space surrounds it. Jeong Se-gwon's Geongyang Houses (建陽住宅) built from 1934 also followed this jungdang-sik layout.) The two jungdang-sik hanok remain at lots 166-53 and 166-65; Chang Myon lived in lot 166-53 from 1932 to 1936, before moving to his house in Myeongnyun 4-ga.

Lot 166 was preserved because it does not adjoin a main road and its alleys are too narrow for cars, but much of it has been damaged by Ikseon-dong's commercialization. While shops that moved in during 2013–15 by renovating hanok only touched up interiors, by 2015–16 glass was replacing exterior walls and gates and glass ceilings were being placed atop tiled roofs, and from 2017 the dominant pattern became gutting everything except the tiled roof.

=== Sexual minorities ===
Ikseon-dong had been a gathering place for sexual minorities since the late 20th century. Gay bars in the Nagwon-dong and Ikseon-dong area operate without signage indicating they are gay venues, as gay male clientele finds them through word of mouth within the community without any advertising; the area temporarily becomes populated with gay men from late evening through the night. To prevent non-LGBT people from entering by mistake, some fly a rainbow flag, or display markers known only to LGBT people. Unlike Itaewon, which is centered on nightclubs, this area is mostly bars. These venues continued to operate during the COVID-19 pandemic, and after it was revealed that a COVID-19 patient who had visited an Itaewon gay club had also visited Ikseon-dong, several LGBT rights groups announced their commitment to enabling sexual minorities to receive COVID-19 tests without rights violations.

As non-LGBT people increased in the Ikseon-dong alley known among sexual minorities as 'Gerosaegil' (Gay + Garosu-gil), sexual minorities felt uncomfortable under their prejudiced gaze and even feared being outed. Seoul Metropolitan Government is pursuing urban regeneration in the area between Samil-daero and Seosuranggil centered on Donhwamun-ro, under the name 'Historical and Cultural Regeneration Plan', but has drawn criticism for failing to consider the LGBT history that clearly existed there. In response, the 2018 Korea Queer Film Festival screened Kwon Uk's independent documentary Dada-Ikseon (2018), which documented the LGBT community in and around Ikseon-dong.

== Population ==
The resident population of Ikseon-dong is around 1,000 people, and has been declining since the 2010s as the neighborhood has undergone gentrification. Over three years from 2014, the population of around 1,000 dropped by 377 people. The spaces vacated by long-term residents, who were mostly tenants, have largely been replaced by commercial establishments. During the early gentrification stage of 2014–2016, the change mainly involved residents' supermarkets and laundromats being replaced by other businesses; from 2017 onwards, the number of tenants shrank and establishments catering to younger demographics surged, with a growing proportion of chain stores. As of September 2019, among the buildings in lot 166, stores related to traditional culture accounted for 7.9% and non-commercial buildings (including residential) for 9.5%, while the remainder were all restaurants, cafés, bars, and similar establishments.

Changes in floating population accompanied changes in the neighborhood. In 2013, visitors to Ikseon-dong were few and mostly arrived by chance. Between 2014 and 2015, the main visitors were people who had previously visited Ikseon-dong and those who learned of it from acquaintances or the internet. Even then, Ikseon-dong still retained a quiet atmosphere, but frequent visitors already sensed the change; by December 2015, the average floating population between 11am and 2pm had reached some 30,000. Between 2016 and 2017, the number of first-time visitors grew far larger than those who already knew the area; between 2018 and 2019 the floating population exploded further, becoming so crowded that strolling through Ikseon-dong as before was no longer possible. Residents initially reacted positively to the early stages of gentrification, seeing it as a 'new breakthrough' for Ikseon-dong, but as tourist numbers continued to rise and renovation noise and dust accumulated, they came to view the changes unfavorably. Shop owners at first welcomed the increase in foot traffic and the variety of stores it brought, but as they raised prices to cover increased staff costs and higher rents, and as subsequent merchants who entered purely to capture foot traffic divided up the revenue, they see a growing proportion of visitors who rush through to look and leave without spending.

The entity identified as the main driver of gentrification in Ikseon-dong is a company called Ikseon Dada. This company, founded by two young outsiders, opened a succession of gama bars, Western restaurants, workshops, and cafés in Ikseon-dong while brokering business startups for other entrepreneurs, forming a commercial district. As the commercial district gradually expanded, hanok sale prices and rents rose steadily. Ikseon Dada, which had simply leased hanok to operate businesses, began directly purchasing hanok through crowdfunding in early 2017, and also realized capital gains by reselling a hanok where its registered office was located and a motel it had converted into a hotel. Around the same time, the company illegally added a second story to a hanok and operated a discotheque in a hanok directly abutting residences without residents' consent, causing noise issues. While the company contends that taking over vacated tenant spaces for its own stores has nothing to do with gentrification, Sung Kong-hoe University Graduate School Professor Shin Hyun-jun has critiqued society for granting "legitimacy as having revitalized a neglected area" and "pride as a pioneer of place change" to these few actors driving the transformation; Youngsan University Department of Real Estate and Finance Professor Seo Jeong-ryeol, while viewing positively Ikseon Dada's role in activating the commercial district, criticized its business model of profiting through real estate on the other side of that activity. Jugan Chosun also observed that while Ikseon Dada—which generated some ₩2.5 billion in revenue in 2017 alone—was the first to attempt privately-led urban regeneration, it pursued profit above all else.

Beyond being a hanok village built by Jeong Se-gwon, Ikseon-dong contains many other cultural resources, but after commercialization took hold in its alleys, press and academics began emphasizing only the hanok village character; scholars have observed that a discourse emerged that erased post-liberation history and diverse resources in favor of stressing only the hanok's 'traditional character'. Indeed, elderly residents who had no need to leave Jongno 3-ga—encompassing Donui-dong and Ikseon-dong—were forced to seek out new neighborhoods, and the LGBT community also faced serious threats. As a result, although Donui-dong and Ikseon-dong had similarly been mixtures of residences and entertainment venues, despite being geographically adjacent they came to be dominated by different generations—the elderly working-class male and the young middle-class female, respectively—reinforcing physical and psychological boundaries.

In light of this situation, Seoul National University Graduate School of Environmental Studies Professor Kim Gyeong-min has argued that true preservation means protecting community values in addition to the physical and historical value of being Seoul's oldest concentrated hanok district, and that Seoul Metropolitan Government should consider providing administrative support to tenants continuing to live in Ikseon-dong and their landlords. Ewha Womans University Graduate School of International Studies Professor Choe Jun-sik has criticized the reality where Western-style shops proliferate in Ikseon-dong while residents are pushed out, arguing that if commercialization is inevitable, Ikseon-dong should become a space where original residents can still live and where tourists can find many shops related to traditional Korean culture. A humble rice-and-side-dishes restaurant 'Busanjip' (at 26 Donui-dong) has been converted into a French restaurant, and 'Suryeonjip' (at 174 Ikseon-dong) has relocated and been replaced by a dumpling shop, and there are assessments that—like Jeonju Hanok Village—Ikseon-dong preserves the hanok spaces while losing the area's unique identity.

== Notes ==
Content notes

Reference notes
