= Caravello =

Caravello is a surname. Notable people with the surname include:

- Eric Carr (born Paul Charles Caravello; 1950–1991), American musician
- Joe Caravello (born 1963), American football player
- Perry Caravello (born 1963), American actor, comedian, podcaster, and 2020 Presidential candidate

== See also ==
- Caravelle (disambiguation)
