= Sunset/Sunside =

Jazz club in Paris, France

Coordinates: 48°51′35″N 2°20′52″E

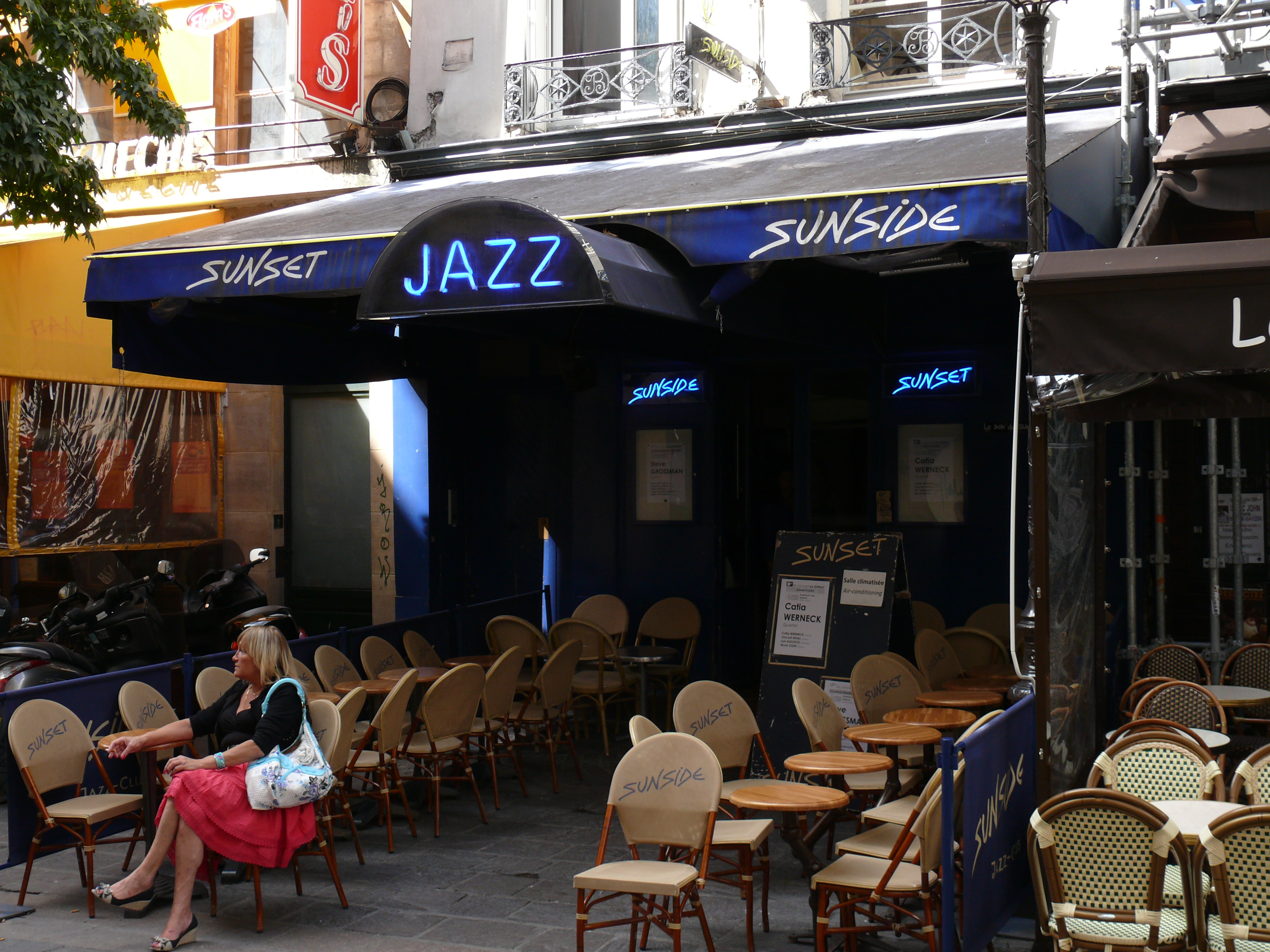
- Interactive map of Sunset/Sunside
- Location: Paris, France
- Type: Jazz club

Construction
- Opened: 1983

Website
- www.sunset-sunside.com

The Sunset/Sunside is one of the main jazz clubs in Paris, France. It was founded in 1983 and is the first jazz club to settle in the rue des Lombards which hosts several other famous jazz clubs such as Le Baiser Salé and Le Duc des Lombards.

== See also ==
- List of jazz clubs
