= Kim Jong-hun =

Kim Jong-hun may refer to:

- Kim Jong-hoon (politician, born 1952) (김종훈) (born 1952), South Korean politician
- Jeong H. Kim (김종훈) (born 1960), Korean-American entrepreneur
- Kim Jong-hoon (politician, born 1964) (김종훈) South Korean politician
- Kim Jong-hoon (footballer) (김종훈) (born 1980), South Korean football player
- Kim Jong-hun (footballer) (김정훈), North Korean football player
- Kim Jong-hoon (actor) (born 1992), South Korean actor

== See also ==
- Kim Jeong-hun (disambiguation) (김정훈)
