= East Bristol Jazz Club =

Jazz club in Bristol, England

East Bristol Jazz Club is based in Bristol, England, and was formed in 2001 with the aim of supporting and bringing new jazz and new musicians to the Bristol community.

The club had a residency at Seymours Club near Old Market before it moved to St George in 2006. It moved to The Cross Hands in Fishponds in 2007 and then to The Greenbank in Easton where it has been based since November 2009. The club runs regular 'jam' nights each month, usually the second Monday, and is being run by a number of notable local musicians including vocalist Nick Langston, keyboard player John Lambert, vocalist Will Grealish, saxophonist Simon Greening and trumpet player Walter Dirks.

The jam nights and other special events feature a broad cross-section of Bristol's jazz musicians and occasional guests including Dennis Rollins, Gilad Atzmon and Sotho Sounds. Special events have also included notable local musicians such as Dave Mowat (trumpet) and James Morton (saxophone), and performances by respected vocalists including Kizzy Morrell, Emma Hutchinson, Nick Langston and Will Grealish. The current rhythm section includes John Lambert on keyboards with occasional appearances by Dale Hambridge, Valere Speranza on bass, with occasional appearances by Jon Short and guest drummers including Greg White.

The band 'Mood Indigo' which features EBJC members including Will Grealish, Robbie Tabrett, John Lambert and Jim Pimpernell performed at the 2008 Miri International Jazz Festival. Some of the members were also featured on vocalist Nick Langston's 2008 album Captivated. Nick Langston also had two performances at Glastonbury 2010.

Members of the club have also been responsible for the 'King Cotton' workshops and performances marking the abolition of the slave trade.

== See also ==
- List of jazz clubs
