= Jazz club =

Type of music venue dedicated to jazz music

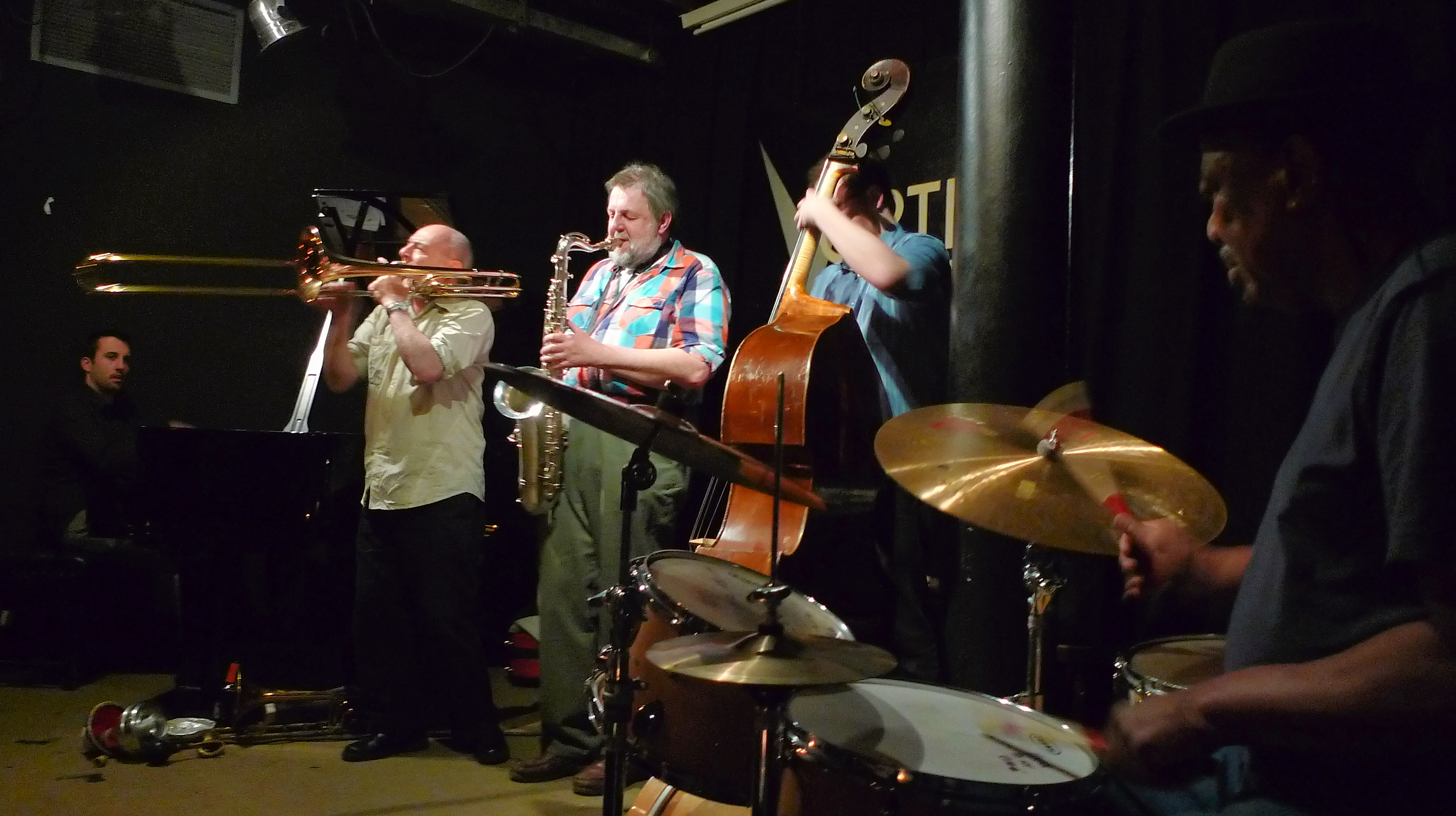
The Louis Moholo Quintet performing at a jazz club

A jazz club is a venue where the primary entertainment is the performance of live jazz music, although some jazz clubs primarily focus on the study and/or promotion of jazz-music. Jazz clubs are usually a type of nightclub or bar, which is licensed to sell alcoholic beverages. Jazz clubs were in large rooms in the eras of Orchestral jazz and big band jazz, when bands were large and often augmented by a string section. Large rooms were also more common in the Swing era, because at that time, jazz was popular as a dance music, so the dancers needed space to move. With the transition to 1940s-era styles like Bebop and later styles such as soul jazz, small combos of musicians such as quartets and trios were mostly used, and the music became more of a music to listen to, rather than a form of dance music. As a result, smaller clubs with small stages became practical.

In the 2000s, jazz clubs may be found in the basements of larger residential buildings, in storefront locations or in the upper floors of retail businesses. They can be rather small compared to other music venues, such as rock music clubs, reflecting the intimate atmosphere of jazz shows and long-term decline in popular interest in jazz. Despite being called "clubs", these venues are usually not exclusive. Some clubs, however, have a cover charge if a live band is playing. Some jazz clubs host "jam sessions" after hours or on early evenings of the week. At jam sessions, both professional musicians and amateurs will typically share the stage.

== History ==
In the 19th century, before the birth of jazz, popular forms of live music for most well-to-do white Americans included classical concert music, such as concerti and symphonies, music played at performances, such as the opera and the ballet, and ballroom music. For these people, going out was a formal occasion, and the music was treated as something to listen to (if at the symphony or the opera house), or dance reservedly to (if at a ball).

During the same century, African-American communities were marginalized from an economic perspective. But despite this lack of material wealth, they had thriving community and a culture based around informal music performances, such as brass band performances at funerals, music sung in church and music played for families eating picnics in parks. African-American culture developed communal activities for informal sharing, such as Saturday night fish fries, Sunday camping along the shores of Lake Pontchartrain at Milneburg and Bucktown, making red beans and rice banquettes on Mondays, and holding nightly dances at neighborhood halls all over town. This long and deep commitment to music and dance, along with the mixing of musical traditions like spiritual music from the church, the blues carried into town by rural guitar slingers, the minstrel shows inspired by plantation life, the beat and cadence of military marching bands and the syncopation of ragtime, led to the creation of a new way to listen to live music. In the jazz history books, places such as New Orleans, Chicago, Harlem, Kansas City, U Street in Washington D.C., and the Central Avenue zone of Los Angeles are often cited as the key nurturing places of jazz.

The African musical traditions primarily made use of a single-line melody and call-and-response pattern, and the rhythms have a counter-metric structure and reflect African speech patterns. Lavish festivals featuring African-based dances to drums were organized on Sundays at Place Congo, or Congo Square, in New Orleans until 1843. Another influence on black music came from the style of hymns of the church, which black slaves had learned and incorporated into their own music as spirituals. During the early 19th century an increasing number of black musicians learned to play European instruments.

The "Black Codes" outlawed drumming by slaves, which meant that African drumming traditions were not preserved in North America, unlike in Cuba, Haiti, and elsewhere in the Caribbean. African-based rhythmic patterns were retained in the United States in large part through "body rhythms" such as stomping, clapping, and patting juba. In the post-Civil War period (after 1865), African Americans were able to obtain surplus military bass drums, snare drums and fifes, and an original African-American drum and fife music emerged, featuring tresillo and related syncopated rhythmic figures.

The abolition of slavery in 1865 led to new opportunities for the education of freed African Americans. Although strict segregation limited employment opportunities for most blacks, many were able to find work in entertainment. Black musicians were able to provide entertainment in dances, minstrel shows, and in vaudeville, during which time many marching bands were formed. Black pianists played in bars, clubs and brothels, as ragtime developed. Blues is the name given to both a musical form and a music genre, which originated in African-American communities of primarily the "Deep South" of the United States at the end of the 19th century from their spirituals, work songs, field hollers, shouts and chants and rhymed simple narrative ballads.

The music of New Orleans had a profound effect on the creation of early jazz. Many early jazz performers played in venues throughout the city, such as the brothels and bars of the red-light district around Basin Street, known as "Storyville". In addition to dance bands, there were numerous marching bands who played at lavish funerals (later called jazz funerals), which were arranged by the African-American and European American communities. The instruments used in marching bands and dance bands became the basic instruments of jazz.

=== Jazz Age ===
Despite its growing popularity, not all who lived in the Jazz Age were keen on the sound of jazz music, and especially of jazz clubs. By the advent of the 20th century, campaigns to censor the "devil's music" started to appear, prohibiting when and where jazz clubs could be built. For example, a Cincinnati home for expectant mothers won an injunction to prevent construction of a neighboring theater where jazz will be played, convincing a court that the music was dangerous to fetuses. By the end of the 1920s, at least 60 communities across the nation enacted laws prohibiting jazz in public dance halls.

Prohibition in 1920 fostered the emergence of the underground, gangster-run jazz clubs. These venues served alcohol, hired black musicians, and allowed whites, blacks and audiences of all social classes to mingle socially for the first time. Although the underground jazz clubs encouraged the intermingling of races in the Jazz Age, there were other jazz clubs, such as the Cotton Club in New York, that were white-only.

=== Bebop ===
By the 1940s, jazz music as a form of popular music was on the decline, and so was the popularity of jazz clubs. In the early 1940s, bebop-style performers began to shift jazz from danceable popular music towards a more challenging "musician's music". Since bebop was meant to be listened to, not danced to, it could use faster tempos. Drumming shifted to a more elusive and explosive style and highly syncopated music. While bebop did not draw the huge crowds that had once flocked to Swing-era dance clubs, the bebop style was based around small combos such as the jazz quartet. With these smaller combos on stage, smaller clubs could afford to pay the ensembles even with much smaller clubs than were common in the 1930s heyday of the Cotton Club.

=== Soul Jazz ===
Soul Jazz was a development of hard bop which incorporated strong influences from blues, gospel and rhythm and blues to create music for small groups, often the organ trio of Hammond organ, drummer and tenor saxophonist. Unlike hard bop, soul Jazz generally emphasized repetitive grooves and melodic hooks, and improvisations were often less complex than in other Jazz styles. It often had a steadier "funk" style groove, which was different from the swing rhythms typical of much hard bop. Soul Jazz proved to be a boon to Jazz clubs, because since organ trios were based around the powerful Hammond organ, a three-piece organ trio could fill a nightclub with the same full sound that in previous years would have required a five- or six-piece band.

=== Resurgence of traditionalism ===
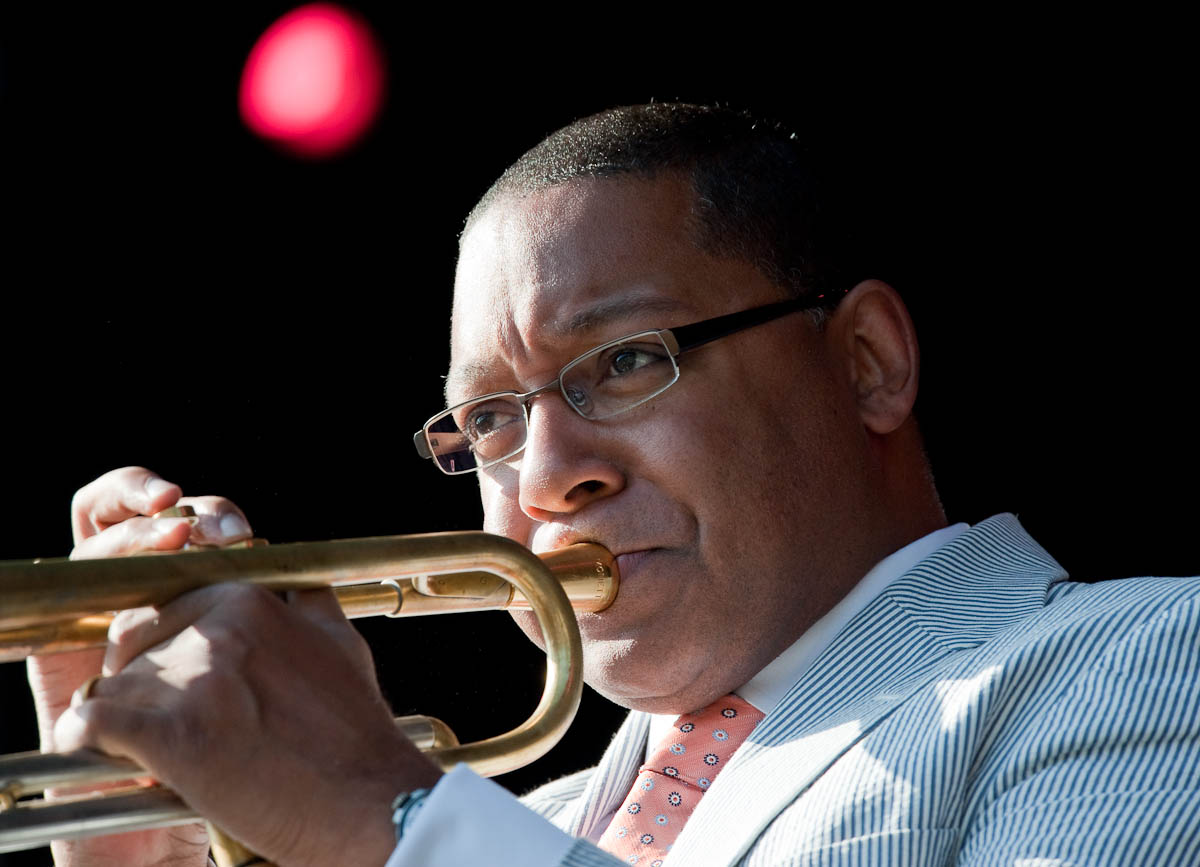
Wynton Marsalis

The 1980s saw something of a reaction against the fusion and free jazz that had dominated the 1970s. Trumpeter Wynton Marsalis emerged early in the decade, and strove to create music within what he believed was the tradition, rejecting both fusion and free jazz and creating extensions of the small and large forms initially pioneered by such artists as Louis Armstrong and Duke Ellington, as well as the hard bop of the 1950s. Whether Marsalis' critical and commercial success was a cause or a symptom of the reaction against Fusion and Free Jazz and the resurgence of interest in the kind of jazz pioneered in the 1960s (particularly Modal Jazz and Post-Bop) is debatable; nonetheless there were many other manifestations of a resurgence of traditionalism, even if fusion and free jazz were by no means abandoned and continued to develop and evolve. Well into the 1980s, the clubs where it is performed in these countries provide meeting places for political dissidents, however, attendance of these clubs is minuscule compared to the popularity of jazz clubs during the Jazz Age.

== Notable clubs ==
=== North America ===
==== New Orleans, Louisiana ====
Known as the "birthplace of jazz", New Orleans is home to some of the oldest and most famous jazz clubs in the United States, including:

- Economy Hall
- Preservation Hall
- Storyville, New Orleans

==== New York, New York ====
- Blue Note
- Birdland
- Seventh Avenue South
- Village Vanguard
- Savoy Ballroom
- Minton's Playhouse
- Cotton Club

==== St. Louis, Missouri ====
- Club Riviera
- Peacock Alley
- Club Plantation

==== Washington D.C. and U Street ====
- Howard Theater
- Crystal Caverns
- Lincoln Theater

==== Chicago, Illinois ====
- The Beehive Lounge
- Mandel Hall
- Cadillac Bob's
- Club DeLisa
- Gerri's Palm Tavern
- Blue Note
- The Green Mill
- Andy's Jazz Club
- Winter's Jazz Club

==== San Francisco, California ====
- Black Hawk

==== Seattle, Washington ====
- Dimitriou's Jazz Alley

==== Denver, Colorado ====
- Dazzle Denver

==== Boston, Massachusetts ====
- Wally's Cafe

=== Europe ===
==== Brussels, Belgium ====
- nl:L'Archiduc

==== London, England ====
- Ronnie Scott's Jazz Club
- 606 Club

==== Paris, France ====
- Le Caveau de la Huchette
- Jazz Club Étoile

==== Milan, Italy ====
- Blue Note

==== Rome, Italy ====
- BeBop Jazz Club

=== Middle East ===
==== Tel Aviv, Israel ====
- Beit HaAmudim

=== Asia ===
==== Seoul, South Korea ====
- All That Jazz
- Chunnyundongando
- Club Evans

== See also ==
- List of jazz clubs
- Jazz kissa
- Listening Bar
