= Caravelle =

Caravelle may refer to:

== Transportation ==
- Volkswagen Caravelle (disambiguation), minibuses/vans produced by Volkswagen
- Renault Caravelle, the roadster automobile produced by Renault
- Plymouth Caravelle, a sedan made by Chrysler Corporation from 1983 to 1988
- Sud Aviation Caravelle, a French jet airliner produced by Sud Aviation
- SS Caravelle, a Danish cargo ship in service 1938-40
- An alternative spelling of caravel, a type of sailing ship

== Businesses ==
- Caravelle Hotel, Ho Chih Minh City, Vietnam
- La Caravelle, a restaurant and jazz venue in Marseille, France
- La Caravelle (New York), a restaurant in New York City, specializing in French cuisine

== Other uses ==
- The Caravelles, a British duo girl band
- The Caravelle peninsula of the French Caribbean island of Martinique
- Caravelle, the French marketing name for the typeface Folio

== See also ==
- Caravelle Manifesto, 1960 Vietnamese political document presented in that hotel
- Caravel (disambiguation)
