= Club Evans =

Jazz club in Seoul, South Korea

- 클럽에반스
- Address: 2nd floor, 63 Wausan-ro, Mapo District, Seoul, South Korea
- Coordinates: 37.5503°N 126.9229°E
- Opened: January 1, 2001

Club Evans (Korean: 클럽에반스) is a jazz club in Mapo District, Seoul, South Korea. The club was founded on January 1, 2001, and is named for the American jazz pianist Bill Evans. The owner of the club reportedly considered naming the club after another jazz pianist Keith Jarrett, but preferred the sound of "Club Evans".

The club is reportedly open most days, and hosts performances in the evenings. It is considered a platform for emerging jazz artists to perform. By 2012, it reportedly hosted over 10,000 musicians in over 4,000 performances. It also has jazz recording studios and a jazz academy as well. The club was closed for eight months beginning in 2020 during the COVID-19 pandemic; it then reopened and resumed performances.
