= Caravel (disambiguation) =

The caravel is a type of sailing ship.

Caravel may also refer to:

- Caravel (horse), an American Thoroughbred racehorse
- SV Independiente Caravel or simply Caravel, an Aruban football club
- Caravel, a starship transporting colonists in the video game Outriders
- "Caravel", a track on the 2021 album The Battle at Garden's Gate by American rock band Greta Van Fleet

== See also ==
- Caravelle (disambiguation)
