= Chunnyundongando =

Jazz club in Seoul, South Korea

- 천년동안도
- Interactive map of Chunnyundongando
- Address: 2F, 134 Supyo-ro, Jongno District, Seoul, South Korea
- Coordinates: 37.5730°N 126.9885°E
- Owner: Lim Won-bin
- Event: Jazz

Construction
- Opened: 1996

Website
- www.chunnyun.com (in Korean and English)

Chunnyundongando (Korean: 천년동안도; lit. Island of a thousand years) is a jazz club in Jongno District, Seoul, South Korea. It was founded in 1996 by Lim Won-bin (임원빈), originally in the Daehangno area. It then moved to Ikseon-dong, then to Nakwon-dong in 2017. The club reportedly holds concerts every day, 365 days a year.

Early in the restaurant's history, it was forced to close, due to a law that restricted more than two people performing in a restaurant. Lim filed a lawsuit that eventually ruled in his favor; the law was deemed unconstitutional and was overturned. The business moved from Daehangno because of the area's high rent.
