= Shaft (club) =

Blues and rock club in Istanbul, Turkey

Coordinates: 40.9902°N 29.0278°E

Shaft Rock Blues and Jazz Club, Istanbul, Turkey

Shaft Rock Blues and Jazz Club is a blues and rock club in Istanbul, Turkey. Besides providing blues and jazz music which gives the place its name, it additionally offers a combination of rock music covers by famous Turkish musicians and a weekly free stage night for newcomer musicians. Its late night drinking and disco style entertainment is one of the few on the Anatolian side of Istanbul.

Its location in regional town and city centre Kadıköy has been a focus of some contribution to late night disorder in this area, prompting a recent zero tolerance approach to drunkenness in this licensed premise. It offers live music from 23:00 to 04:00, and has a busy dancefloor almost every night.
