= Kim Jeong-hun =

Kim Jeong-hun or Kim Jŏng-hun (김정훈) may refer to:

- Kim Jong-hun (footballer) (born 1956), North Korean football player
- Kim Jeong-hoon (born 1980), South Korean singer and actor
- Kim Jung-hoon (table tennis), South Korean table tennis player
- Kim Jeong-hoon (footballer) (born 1991), South Korean football player

== See also ==
- Jeong H. Kim (김종훈; born 1960) is a Korean-American entrepreneur
- Kim Jong-hun (disambiguation) (김종훈)
