= Kim Yong-jin =

Kim Yongjin is a South Korean politician.

Other individuals with this name include:

- Kim Yong-jin (politician), North Korean government official, died in 2016
- Kim Yong-jin (musician), member of South Korean band Bohemian (band)
