= Beit HaAmudim =

Jazz club in Tel Aviv, Israel

- בית העמודים
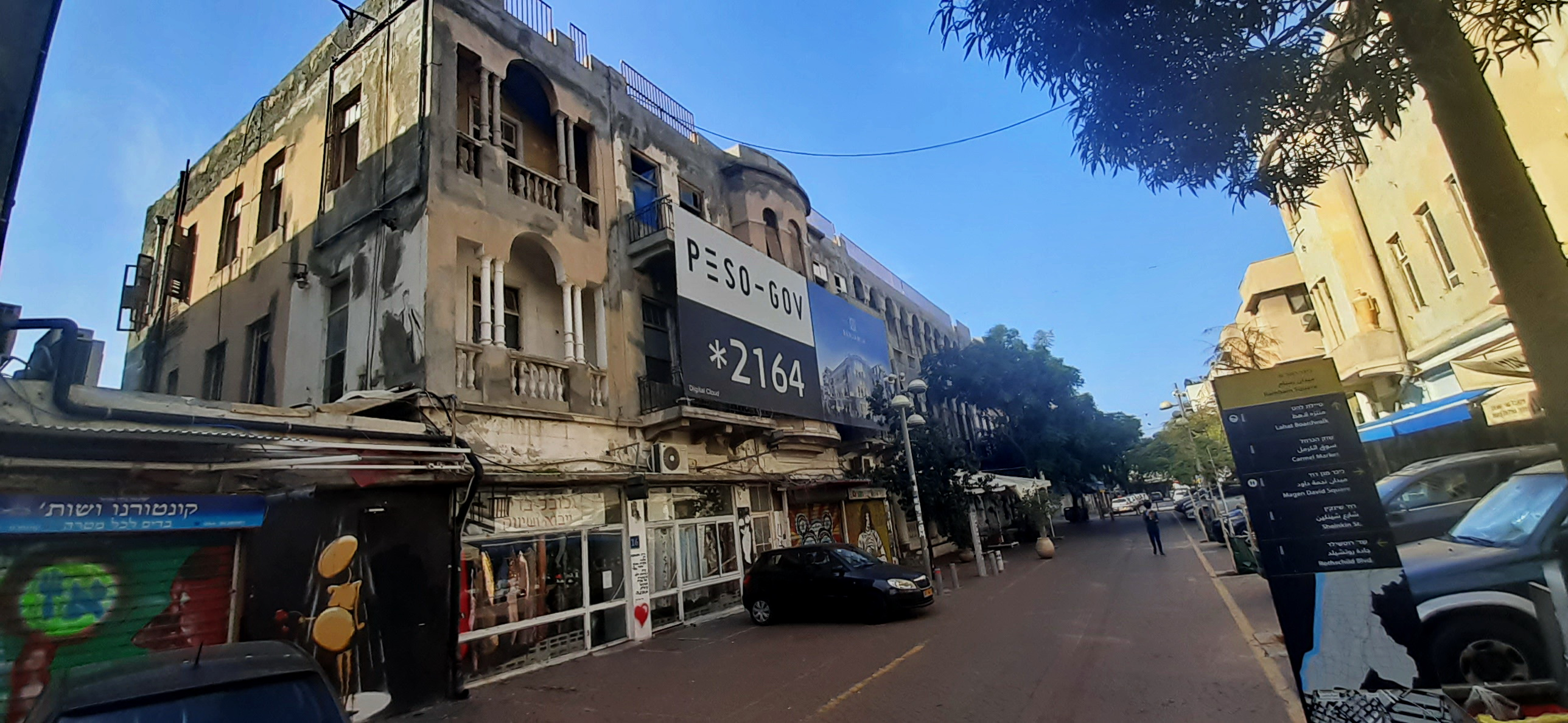
- The Jazz club from the outside
- Address: Rambam 14; Tel Aviv; Israel
- Type: Jazz Club
- Opened: 2011

Beit HaAmudim (בית העמודים in Hebrew) meaning, the House of Columns, is a building located at 14 Rambam Street, in the Nahalat Binyamin neighborhood of Tel Aviv. Since 2011, it operates as a jazz club, hosting performances by Israeli jazz musicians every evening.

== History ==
"Beit HaAmudim" also known by its other name, "Zalman Baron House," was a residential project initiated by Zalman Baron, a Jewish immigrant from the United States, and constructed by Yehuda Magidovich in 1925. Baron acquired three adjacent plots of land on which the building was constructed. The structure consists of three interconnected buildings, each with separate staircase rooms.

In 2011, a neighborhood bar-café was opened at the location. Yael Hedany, a jazz musician and enthusiast with a background in the restaurant industry, proposed to the owner, Eran Kol, to host jazz performances at the venue, in order to make it unique.

In 2015, Beit HaAmudim was selected by the American magazine Business Insider as "one of the 11 best jazz clubs in the world". In 2017, the venue was chosen by the American Jazz magazine DownBeat as one of the best jazz clubs in the world.

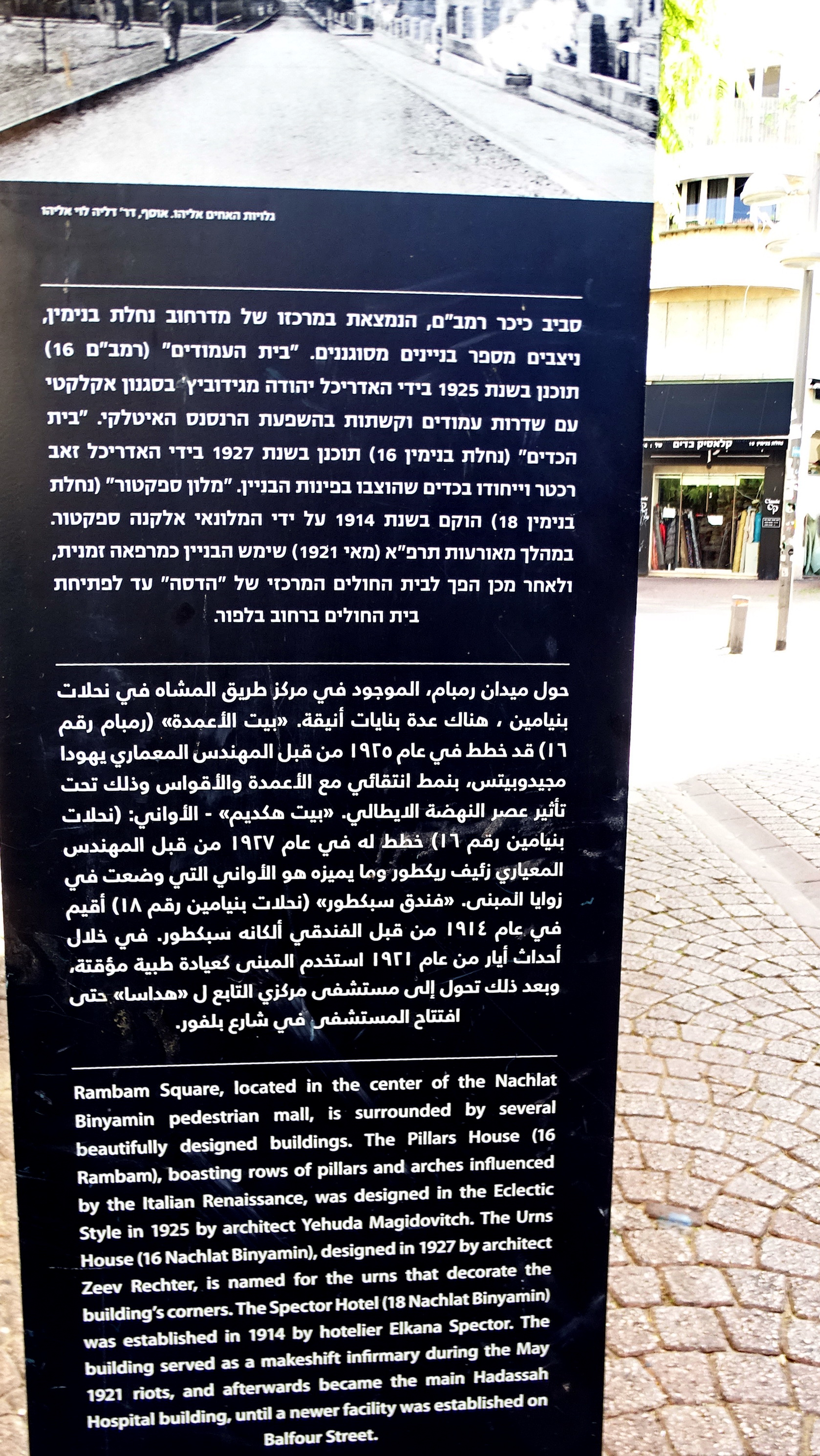
Tel Aviv placard on history of Architecture of building and history of building
