= Le Chat Qui Pêche =

Jazz club in Paris, France

Coordinates: 48.8530°N 2.3462°E

Le Chat Qui Pêche is a Parisian jazz club and restaurant founded in the mid-1950s, located in a cellar in rue de la Huchette in the Latin Quarter, on the left bank of the Seine.

It was run by Madame Ricard, who had been in the French Resistance during the war, and "who looked so small and delicate that people likened her to the 'Little Sparrow', Edith Piaf. According to legend, Ricard had become a heroine of the French Resistance by informing against the Nazis. As she floated through the club she was all maternal warmth, however, calling the musicians 'mes enfants' and housing them in an apartment she kept over the club."

According to the recollections of Jimmy Wormworth, who was invited to perform at Le Chat Qui Pêche in August 1957 with his American Jazz Quintet (comprising Wormworth as drummer and leader, Roland Ashby on piano, Sal Amico on trumpet, Barry Rogers on trombone and George Braithwaite on alto saxophone): "I was told that we made her club so successful, because there were many bus tours coming to hear us, that, after us, Madame Ricard hired many famous American jazz musicians, so that she had the funds to add another floor in the club....I don't know if that's true, but I think it was the late Al Levitt, who told me that, because he stayed in Paris, after we came back to the USA."

In the 1960s numerous jazz legends played there, including Bud Powell, Chuck Israels, Chet Baker, Eric Dolphy, Jackie McLean, Johnny Griffin, Lucky Thompson, Oscar Pettiford and Donald Byrd, whose 1958 Au Chat Qui Peche date (with pianist Walter Davis, Jr., bassist Doug Watkins, drummer Art Taylor and featuring Bobby Jaspar on tenor sax) was one of his earliest live recordings as a leader.

The club lasted up to 1970, when Madame Ricard sold her license. A restaurant with the same name now operates at the location.
