= La Caravelle =

Restaurant and jazz venue in Marseille, France

Coordinates: 43°17′47″N 5°22′19″E

La Caravelle is a restaurant and jazz venue in Marseille, France, situated on the first floor of the Hotel Belle Vue.
