= Andy's Jazz Club =

Chicago jazz club

Coordinates: 41.8899°N 87.6274°W

Andy's Jazz Club, located several blocks north of the Chicago Loop, was founded as "Andy's 11 E. Lounge" in 1951 by Andy Rizzuto. A group of investors, including Scott Chisolm, who would become its long-time proprietor, bought the property in 1975, changing its name to "Andy's". The club is one of the city's most popular jazz venues.

In 1977 jazz promoters Penny Tyler, once president of the Jazz Institute of Chicago, and John Defauw began producing midday jazz sessions at Andy's, which was later expanded to include performances later in the day with sets at 5pm and 9pm. The 5pm performance - known as "Jazz at Five" - has since become a Chicago tradition. Tyler booked talent for the club until the 1990s and the first Chicago Jazz Fest was planned on the premises.

Performers at the club have included Larry Coryell, Franz Jackson, Von Freeman, and Joey DeFrancesco.
