= Le Baiser Salé =

Jazz club in Paris

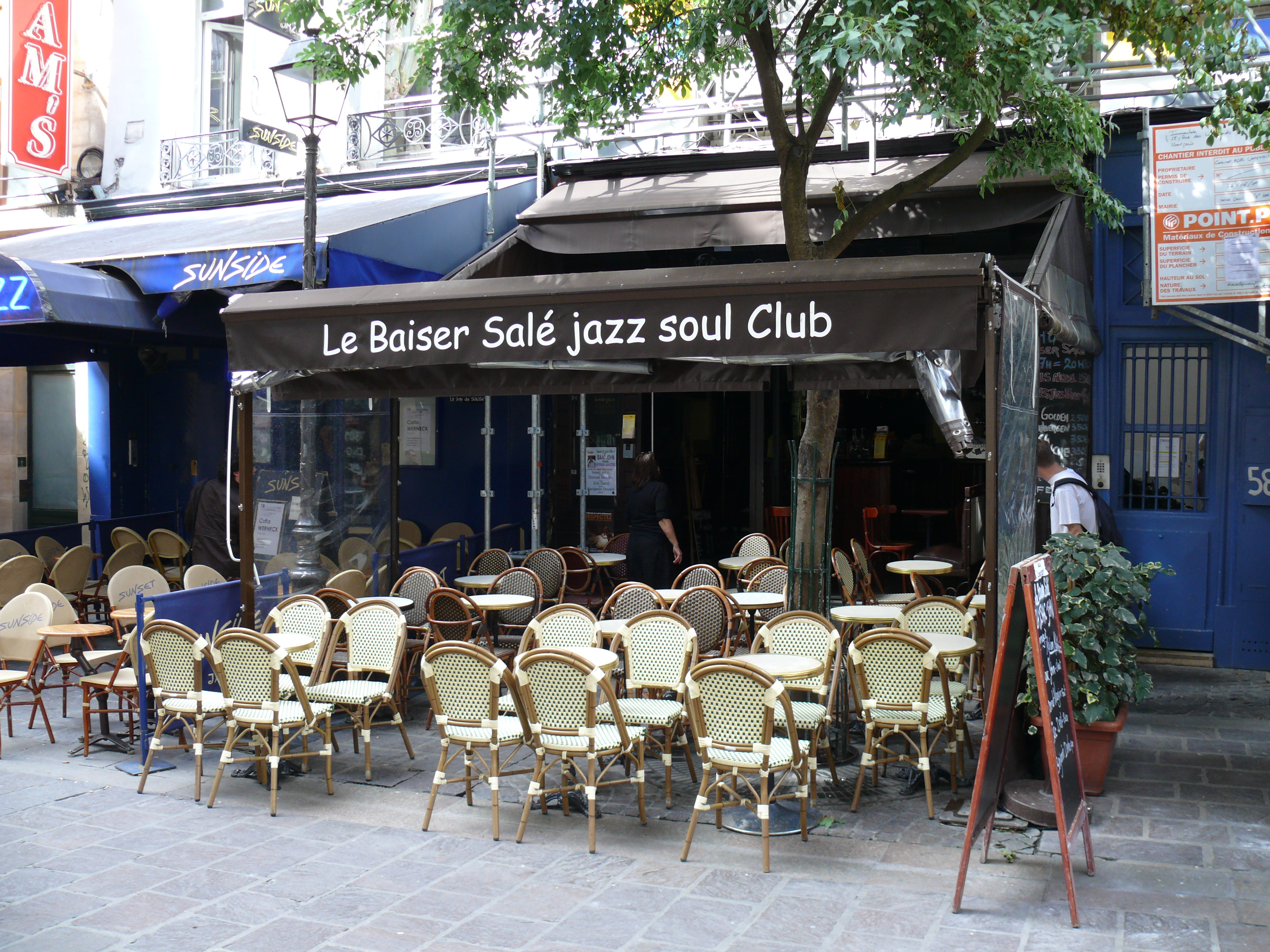
- Interactive map of Le Baiser Salé
- Location: Paris, France
- Type: Jazz club

Construction
- Opened: 1983

Website
- www.lebaisersale.com

Le Baiser Salé (French for "The Salty Kiss") is a jazz club in Paris, at 58, rue des Lombards, that opened in 1983. It was founded by the Gibson Brothers.

Musicians such as, Richard Bona, Angélique Kidjo, Monica Passos, Ultramarine, Les Étoiles, Sylvain Luc, Rido Bayonne, Leni Stern, Thierry Eliez, Etienne Mbappé, Mario Canonge, Nguyen Le, Nina Gat and others have played at Le Baiser Salé.

== See also ==
- List of jazz clubs
