= Strength (The RH Factor EP) =

2004 studio EP by The RH Factor

EP by The RH Factor
- Released: September 28, 2004
- Recorded: January–September, 2002
- Studio: Electric Lady Studios, NYC; EastSide Sound, NYC (engineering, mixing); Quad Recording Studios, NYC (mixing); Sterling Sound, NYC (mastering)
- Genre: Jazz
- Length: 45:33
- Label: Verve; B0003157-02
- Producer: Roy Hargrove; Larry Clothier; Dahlia Ambach Caplin; Brian Michel Bacchus; Funmi Ononaiye; Russell Elevado; Fran Cathcart; Joe Claussell

Roy Hargrove chronology
Hard Groove (2003)	Strength (2004)	Nothing Serious (2006)

Strength is a studio EP by trumpeter Roy Hargrove and his group The RH Factor, released by Verve Records on September 28, 2004. It consists of two remixes plus unreleased material from the band's initial recording, Hard Groove, released the previous year.

Hargrove commented about the album, calling it a "dance record" which is "just another representation of the RH Factor, with an emphasis on what we're doing live ... The record company wanted to put out something with fewer songs so that they could really concentrate on promoting it."

Strength was nominated for Best Contemporary Jazz Album at the 2005 Grammy Awards.

== Reception ==
Professional ratings
Review scores
Source	Rating
AllMusic	3/5 stars

The AllMusic review by Thom Jurek described the album as "deep groove jazz-funk and [that] it's played in the pocket, fat and greasy".

JazzTimes wrote that the album "doesn’t have all the hip-hop/R&B star power" but is nonetheless "imaginative and durable".

PopMatters labeled the album "a mixed bag" while being "jolly but unmemorable".

Josef Engles of Rondo magazine was more positive, stating, "Aside from the overly simplistic pop title track 'Strength,' the rest of the album has class and enough improvisational credibility to get even the most hardened, nostalgia-averse critics swaying along."

== Track listing ==
All tracks are written and arranged by Roy Hargrove except where noted.

No.	Title	Writer(s)	Length
1.	"Rich Man's Welfare"	Karl Denson	8:27
2.	"Bop Drop"	Keith Anderson	8:28
3.	"Strength"		4:40
4.	"Listen Here"	Eddie Harris	6:26
5.	"For Fun"	Hargrove; Alfredo Alias; Gordon Chambers; Omar Lye-Fook	7:28
6.	"Universe" (Special Bonus Mix)		10:04
Total length:			45:33

== Personnel ==
Musicians

- Roy Hargrove – trumpet, flugelhorn, keyboards, bass, percussion, vocals, background vocals
- Alfredo Alias (5), Gordon Chambers (5), Omar Lye-Fook (5), Renée Neufville – vocals
- G. Craig "Butter" Glanville (5), Maurice Brown (5), Rhian Ayanna (6), Somi (6), Vivien Goldman (5) – background vocals
- Keith Anderson (a.k.a. DNK) – alto saxophone, tenor saxophone
- Jacques Schwarz-Bart – tenor saxophone, flute; (1, 5)
- Karl Denson – tenor saxophone (1)
- Chalmers "Spanky" Alford – guitar
- Fran Cathcart – acoustic and electric guitars, drum programming; (5, 6)
- James Poyser – keyboards, background vocals; (5)
- Bernard Wright – piano, Roland XP-80 synthesizer, Rhodes piano; (1, 3, 6)
- Bobby Sparks – keyboards, Hammond B3 organ, Wurlitzer electronic piano, Clavinet, ARP String synthesizer
- Brian Michel Bacchus – Korg synthesizer
- Pino Palladino (1, 4), Reggie Washington (2–6) – bass
- Willie Jones III – drums (4, 5)
- Jason "JT" Thomas – drums, vocals; (1–3, 6)
- Dontae Winslow – drum machine (MPC) (5), background vocals
- Daniel Moreno (1, 2), Fred Walcott (6), Kwaku Kwaakye Obeng (1) – percussion

Technical

- Larry Clothier – executive producer
- Roy Hargrove, Dahlia Ambach Caplin – producer
- Brian Michel Bacchus (SoulFeast Music) (5, 6), Funmi Ononaiye (6) – producer, mixing
- Russell Elevado – producer, recording engineer, mixing
- Fran Cathcart – producer (5, 6), recording engineer, mixing (5, 6)
- Joachim "Joe" Claussell (SoulFeast Music) – producer, mixing, drum programming; (5)
- Steef Van De Gevel, Stephen L. Joseph, Steve Mandel – recording engineer
- Alphonse Mouzon, Melissa Bastos, Mickey Tsutsumi – assistant recording engineer
- Chris Gehringer – mastering
- John Newcott, Kelly Pratt – release coordinator
- Hollis King – art direction
- Hee Jeong Lee – design
- Hans Neleman – photography
- Rudy Gutierrez – illustration
