= Grande-Terre (album) =

Studio album by Roy Hargrove's Crisol
- Released: October 18, 2024
- Recorded: April 1998
- Studio: La Terreur studio, Pointe-à-Pitre, Guadeloupe; Effanel Music, New York (original mixing); Sterling Sound, New York City (lacquer cutting)
- Genre: Jazz; Latin jazz
- Length: 60:32
- Label: Verve; 1000162572 CD / 6805332 LP
- Producer: Roy Hargrove; Larry Clothier

Roy Hargrove chronology
The Love Suite: In Mahogany (2023)	Grande-Terre (2024)	Live at KNKX (2026)

Grande-Terre is a studio album by trumpeter Roy Hargrove's Crisol band, recorded in April 1998 and released by Verve Records on October 18, 2024. All of the album's tracks were produced without edits or overdubs.

Verve announced the previously-unheard archival album in September 2024. "Priorities", the tenth track, was released as an advance single on September 5, 2024

For this date, Crisol (Spanish for 'crucible') consisted of Hargrove with alto saxophonist Sherman Irby, tenor saxophonist (and native Guadeloupian) Jacques Schwarz-Bart, trombonist Frank Lacy, guitarist Ed Cherry, pianists Larry Willis and Gabriel Hernández, bassist Gerald Cannon, drummers Willie Jones and Julio Barreto, and percussionists Changuito and Miguel "Angá" Díaz.

For the album, Hargrove gathered a slightly different group from Habana (recorded January 5 & 6, 1997), a recording shortly prior with Crisol.

Track three, "Kamala's Dance" is named for Hargrove's daughter, born in 1997. "Priorities" features a spoken intro and outro by drummer Julio Barreto, in which he performs a 'nkame' chant in the Abakuá language, a standard initiation greeting.

In celebration of the Grande-Terre's release, members of Crisol reunited—Irby, Schwarz-Bart, Lacy, Cannon, Jones III, plus other musicians—to perform some of the album's music live in January 2025.

== Reception ==
Professional ratings
Review scores
Source	Rating
All About Jazz	4/5 stars

Chris May of All About Jazz stated: "The Afro-Cuban rhythms and piano guajeos are entirely of a type with those old Blue Note albums, though presented here with more prominence and played with more authenticity."

Music critic Sharonne Cohen of Everything Jazz praised the recording, noting that "Grande-Terre brims with Crisol's intricate and sophisticated arrangements, Hargrove's explosive, imaginative and soul-stirring playing, and the band's powerful, singular sound."

A Glide magazine review by Jim Hynes noted the "intricate arrangements, the band's powerful, blaring sound, inspired solos, and the singular force of Hargrove's emotive playing", and that "The energy is palpable from the first few notes, and the album reveals an emotional component that's just as moving. He concluded the review, writing that Hargrove's "Crisol ensemble easily ranks with the best of his storied groups."

Lira magazine remarked that the album "immediately captures the listener's attention", "offer[ing] incredibly well-played and well-produced Latin-flavored jazz in songs with different characters".

Alan Scherstuhl, writing for The New York Times, was effusive about the album, noting that it "shows off the high-wire, from-the-gut jazz Hargrove played most nights of his life".

The Wall Street Journal's Larry Blumenfeld wrote: "Horns and reeds play in unison at a furious pace atop syncopated rhythms from Cuban masters... Hargrove's terse figures punctuate the beats; his piercing high notes sound squeezed into being."

Angélika Beener of WBGO stated that the album "captures a moment of musical alchemy that represents one of the key hallmarks of Hargrove’s legacy: the term “crisol,” meaning “melting pot,” perfectly encapsulates Hargrove’s approach, merging various traditions into a unified, singular sound."

NPR Music included Grande-Terre among its "50 Best Albums of 2024", comparing it favorably to its predecessor Habana as "an even more fluent and focused celebration of Afro-Cuban musical lineage, with Hargrove and his Crisol band both in exceptionally strong form".

Aida Brandes-Hargrove, Roy's wife, said the album "shows a lot of the range of Roy".

== Track listing ==
No.	Title	Writer(s)	Length
1.	"Rhumba Roy"	Gabriel Hernández	6:52
2.	"A Song for Audrey"	Gerald L. Cannon	7:15
3.	"Lake Danse"	Roy Hargrove	6:26
4.	"Kamala's Dance"	Hargrove	5:11
5.	"B and B"	Ed Cherry	4:47
6.	"Another Time"	Willie Jones III	5:10
7.	"Lullaby from Atlantis"	Jacques Schwarz-Bart	7:31
8.	"Afreaka"	Cedar Walton	6:10
9.	"Ethiopia"	Larry Willis	5:52
10.	"Priorities"	Hargrove	5:18
Total length:			60:32

- Recorded in April 1998 at Henri Debs' La Terreur studio, Pointe-à-Pitre, Guadeloupe

== Personnel ==
Musicians

- Roy Hargrove – trumpet, flugelhorn
- Sherman Irby – alto saxophone
- Jacques Schwarz-Bart – tenor saxophone
- Frank Lacy – trombone
- Ed Cherry – guitar
- Larry Willis, Gabriel Hernández – piano
- Gerald Cannon – double bass
- Willie Jones III – drums
- Julio Barreto – drums, vocals
- José Luis "Changuito" Quintana, Miguel "Angá" Díaz – percussion

Technical

- Roy Hargrove, Larry Clothier – producer
- Eric Neuser – production and release coordinator
- Ken Druker – release supervisor
- Femi Onafowokan – A&R administration
- Emerson Sudbury – A&R, management
- Adam Blackburn – recording engineer (at Henri Debs' La Terreur studio), original mixing (at Effanel Music, New York)
- John Lee – post-production mixing and mastering
- JN-H – lacquer cutting
- Oliver Schrage – marketing
- Kevin Martinez – digital marketing
- Tai Linzie – art coordinator
- Kyledidthis (Kyle Goen) – art direction, design
- Des McMahon – photography
