= Tyszka =

Tyszka is a Polish surname. Notable people with the name include:

- Alberto Barrera Tyszka (born 1960), Venezuelan writer
- Jadwiga Tyszka (Yagoda Tyszka-Krayewski, 1954–2005), Polish-American actress and pianist
- Jan Tyszka (1867–1919), Polish Marxist revolutionary and politician
- Katarzyna Tyszka (Natalia Starr, born 1993), Polish-American porn actress
- Kazimierz Tyszka (1872–1951), Polish Minister of Railways
- Stanisław Tyszka (born 1979), Polish politician and university lecturer
