= Hard Groove =

2003 studio album by Roy Hargrove & The RH Factor

Studio album by Roy Hargrove
- Released: May 20, 2003
- Recorded: January–September, 2002
- Studio: Electric Lady Studios, NYC
- Genre: Jazz; funk; hip-hop
- Length: 72:17
- Label: Verve; 065 192-2
- Producer: Roy Hargrove

Roy Hargrove chronology
Directions in Music: Live at Massey Hall (2002)	Hard Groove (2003)	Strength (2004)

Hard Groove is a studio album by American trumpeter Roy Hargrove, released on May 20, 2003. It is credited to his group, The RH Factor.

The album peaked at No. 185 on the Billboard 200. "I'll Stay" was nominated for a Grammy Award, in the "Best R&B Performance By a Duo or Group with Vocals" category.

== Production ==
Produced by Hargrove, the album was recorded at Electric Lady Studios in New York City. Hargrove used a 10-piece band on the album. He considered it to be a tribute to his childhood love of hip hop; he also wanted to impart a gospel or spiritual element to the music. Bassists Reggie Washington and Pino Palladino were among the musicians on the album.

D'Angelo appears on the cover of Funkadelic's "I'll Stay". Renée Neufville sang on "Juicy", while Q-Tip rapped on "Poetry", which whom Meshell Ndegeocello and Erykah Badu also appeared on. Anthony Hamilton sang on "Kwah/Home".

The album cover was designed by Rudy Gutierrez, who was inspired by the art of Santana's Abraxas.

== Critical reception ==
Professional ratings
Review scores
Source	Rating
All About Jazz	3.5/5 stars
AllMusic	4/5 stars
The Atlanta Journal-Constitution	B
The Gazette	4.5/5 stars
The Guardian	3/5 stars
The Penguin Guide to Jazz Recordings	3/4 stars

The Boston Globe deemed Hard Groove a "genre-busting album [that] is a funky showcase of Hargrove's musical alacrity." The New York Times labeled it "a late-night party album: it begins upbeat then settles into a stoned haze." The Birmingham Post concluded that "there's a 1970's retro feel which conjures up Donald Byrd's hits, as well as some funk worthy of George Clinton, but it's also very up-to-date, especially in the sophistication of the studio sound."

The Washington Post wrote: "Loose-limbed and groove-driven, it occasionally sounds overplayed and undercomposed as the musicians struggle to find the right balance of rhythmic momentum and jazz improvisation." The New York Amsterdam News stated that Hargrove "plays on the edge of his imagination using jazz improvisations as the key to display another exciting element of his creativity."

AllMusic called the album "an exploration of his multidimensional musical attributes and his belated recognition of years of 'open-eared moonlighting'." The Penguin Guide to Jazz determined that "Pastor 'T'" "might be one of Hargrove's best performances on record."

== Track listing ==
All tracks are written by Roy Hargrove except where noted.

No.	Title	Writer(s)	Length
1.	"Hardgroove"	Bernard Wright	5:31
2.	"Common Free Style"	Roy Hargrove; James Poyser; Common	5:57
3.	"I'll Stay"	George Clinton; Eddie Hazel	7:50
4.	"Interlude"	Hargrove; Stephen Jones; Esantis Washington	0:59
5.	"Pastor 'T'"	Keith Anderson	5:44
6.	"Poetry"	Hargrove; Erykah Badu; Q-Tip	5:48
7.	"The Joint"		5:41
8.	"Forget Regret"	Jacques Schwarz-Bart	3:52
9.	"Out of Town"		3:58
10.	"Liquid Streets"		4:59
11.	"Kwah/Home"		6:00
12.	"How I Know"	Hargrove; Pino Palladino; Shelby Johnson; Chalmers Alford	4:56
13.	"Juicy"	Hargrove; Johnny Mandel; Renée Neufville	6:34
14.	"The Stroke"		4:28
Total length:			72:17

== Personnel ==
Musicians

- Roy Hargrove – trumpet (1–7, 10, 11, 14), flugelhorn (6, 8, 11, 13), piano (6), keyboards (6, 9), bass (9), percussion (7, 13), background vocals (2, 3), arranging, production
- Anthony Hamilton (11), Common (2), Erykah Badu (6), Q-Tip (6), Renée Neufville (13), Shelby Johnson (12), Stephanie McKay (8) – vocals (guest artists)
- D'Angelo – vocals (guest artist; 3), background vocals (3), Wurlitzer piano (3)
- Karl Denson – flute (guest artist; 13)
- Jacques Schwarz-Bart – flute (8), soprano saxophone (11), tenor saxophone (1–3, 6, 8–11, 13, 14), acoustic guitar (8, 10)
- Steve Coleman – alto saxophone (guest artist; 9)
- Keith Anderson – alto saxophone (1, 3, 5, 6, 9, 13), tenor saxophone (5)
- Keith Loftis – tenor saxophone (9)
- Maurice Brown – trumpet (9), background vocals (2)
- Chalmers "Spanky" Alford (1, 3, 5, 7, 8, 12), Cornell Dupree (1, 10) – guitar
- Bernard Wright – piano (12, 13), keyboards (1, 5, 7, 10, 14), Hammond B3 organ (3), ARP synthesizer (12), background vocals (3)
- Bobby Sparks – keyboards, Hammond B3 organ (8, 12), Rhodes piano (5, 7), ARP synthesizer (7), clavinet (1)
- James Poyser – piano (10), keyboards (2, 10, 13), Rhodes piano (2, 10, 13), background vocals (2)
- Marc Cary – Wurlitzer piano (6, 11)
- Tony Suggs – Hammond B3 organ (14)
- Pino Palladino (1, 3, 5, 7, 8, 12), John Arthur Lee (14) – bass
- Reggie Washington – acoustic bass (5, 9, 10, 11), electric bass (1, 4, 13)
- Meshell Ndegeocello – bass (guest artist; 6, 11)
- Daniel Moreno (1, 7, 13, 14), Kwaku Kwaakye Obeng (14) – percussion
- Gene Lake (6, 11), Willie Jones III (4, 9, 10, 11, 13, 14) – drums
- Jason Thomas – drums (1, 3, 5, 7, 8, 12), background vocals (3)
- G. Craig "Butter" Glanville – drums, drum machine (7), background vocals (2)
- Dontae Winslow – MPC drum machine (2, 14), finger snaps (10), background vocals (2)

Technical

- Larry Clothier – executive producer
- Jason Olaine – co-production
- Russell "The Dragon" Elevado – co-production, engineering, mixing
- Steve Mandel, Steef Van De Gevel – engineering (additional)
- Chris Gehringer – mastering
- John Newcott, Kelly Pratt – release coordinator
- Hollis King – art direction, design
- Sachico Asano – design
- Hans Neleman – photography
- Rudy Guiterrez – illustrations (front cover)
