= In Harmony (Roy Hargrove & Mulgrew Miller album) =

2021 live album by Roy Hargrove & Mulgrew Miller

Live album by Roy Hargrove & Mulgrew Miller
- Released: July 23, 2021
- Recorded: January 15, 2006 Merkin Hall, Kaufman Music Center, New York City; September 11, 2007 Williams Center for the Arts, Lafayette College, Easton, PA
- Studio: Resonance Records Studios, Los Angeles, CA (mastering)
- Genre: Jazz
- Length: 1:43:23
- Label: Resonance; HLP-9060 / HCD-2060
- Producer: Larry Clothier; Zev Feldman; George Klabin

Roy Hargrove chronology
Emergence (2009)	In Harmony (2021)	The Love Suite: In Mahogany (2023)

Mulgrew Miller chronology
Solo (2010)	In Harmony (2021)

In Harmony is a live album by trumpeter Roy Hargrove and pianist Mulgrew Miller, recorded live on two dates—January 15, 2006, at Merkin Hall, and September 11, 2007, at Lafayette College's Williams Center for the Arts—it was released posthumously by Resonance Records on July 23, 2021. The album is the only of Hargrove's featuring no drummer.

Hargrove and Miller had previously performed together a handful of times, including at Bradley's jazz club in Greenwich Village, later at the Lionel Hampton Jazz Festival in Moscow, Idaho, as part of the ensemble Superblue, in subsequent years, with Miller subbing in Hargrove's quintet, and having both starred on the album Dizzy’s Business (MCG Jazz, 2006) by the Dizzy Gillespie All-Star Big Band.

== Reception ==
Professional ratings
Review scores
Source	Rating
All About Jazz	4/5 stars
AllMusic	4.5/5 stars
Jazz Journal	4/5 stars
Jazzwise	4/5 stars

All About Jazz's Troy Dostert remarked that the album "reveal[s] a natural camaraderie that is evident from the opening notes of the lead track".

Matt Collar of AllMusic called the album "rapturous interplay during two concerts of jazz standards".

David Whiteis, writing for JazzTimes, stated: "their music is never dry or pedantic ...a sense of irrepressible playfulness makes itself felt, as trumpeter and pianist toss ideas back and forth... every moment new and sparkling, celebrating a brotherhood of the spirit bonded by joy, deepened by inspiration, and anointed with love."

Peter Gamble of the Jazz Journal commented that on the third track, "I Remember Clifford", "the trumpeter shows excellent control in both upper and lower registers" and that "Miller's contribution is of a rhapsodic nature and highly effective to boot."

For Jazzwise, Brian Priestley wrote: "Hargrove is melodically appealing at all times, often deliberately subdued, but sometimes building to a climax that grows organically from Miller's stimulating backings; the pianist's own solo work also flows from these backings, probably his most impressive unaccompanied playing on record."

Steve Futterman, writing for The New Yorker magazine, wrote: "Hargrove and Mulgrew make judicious use of numerous ballads and medium-tempo numbers, exhibiting the thoughtful and deeply expressive qualities that established them as first-rank players in their lifetimes, and as lauded luminaries now that they're gone."

The New York Times author Giovanni Russonello, said of the album, "...both players are at the height of their powers, and it's arresting to hear them up close, in such rich detail."

Nate Chinen, writing for WBGO, boiled the album down to simply, "It's a beautiful way to remember them both."

WRTI's Matt Silver complimented the chemistry between the two musicians, noting that "These are musicians maximally comfortable with themselves and with each other ...the two are perfectly simpatico in style and purpose. [...] both Miller and Hargrove bring a unique improvisational zeal to each tune."

In the album's 68-page liner notes booklet, bassist Ron Carter noted that Miller "knew how to use the pedals of the piano, which is kind of a lost art these days", while trumpeter Chris Botti wrote that Hargrove is "so musical without being macho".

== Track listing ==
Disc one
No.	Title	Writer(s)	Length
1.	"What Is This Thing Called Love?"	Cole Porter	9:11
2.	"This Is Always"	Harry Warren; Mack Gordon	8:24
3.	"I Remember Clifford"	Benny Golson	8:36
4.	"Triste"	Antônio Carlos Jobim	8:36
5.	"Invitation"	Bronisław Kaper; Paul Francis Webster	8:04
6.	"Con Alma"	Dizzy Gillespie	9:44
Total length:			52:35

Disc two
No.	Title	Writer(s)	Length
1.	"Never Let Me Go"	Raymond Evans; Jay Livingston	8:29
2.	"Just in Time"	Jule Styne; Betty Comden; Adolph Green	9:11
3.	"Fungii Mama"	Blue Mitchell	6:58
4.	"Monk's Dream"	Thelonious Monk	5:57
5.	"Ruby, My Dear"	Monk	7:27
6.	"Blues for Mr. Hill"	Roy Hargrove	7:36
7.	"Ow! (Encore)"	Gillespie	5:10
Total length:			50:48 1:43:23

== Personnel ==
Musicians

- Roy Hargrove – trumpet, flugelhorn
- Mulgrew Miller – piano

Technical

- Larry Clothier – producer, recording
- Zev Feldman – producer, photo research, liner notes
- George Klabin – executive producer, mixing, sound restoration, mastering
- Zak Shelby-Szyszko – associate producer, production manager, photo research, photography
- Gabriel Guper – assistant sound restoration engineer
- Timothy Frey – audio engineer (at the Williams Center For The Arts)
- Fran Gala – mixing, sound restoration, mastering
- Ambrose Akinmusire, Chris Botti, Christian McBride, Common, Eddie Henderson, George Cables, Jon Batiste, Karriem Riggins, Kenny Barron, Keyon Harrold, Robert Glasper, Ron Carter, Sean Jones, Sonny Rollins, Ted Panken (essay), Victor Lewis – liner notes, interview statements
- Gordon H. Jee, John Sellards – design
- John Koenig – album package editor
- R. Andrew Lepley – photography (back cover, of Hargrove)
- Jimmy Katz – photography (cover; back cover, of Miller)
- Alan Nahigian, Chris Hoven, Jean-Francois Laberine, John Abbott, Petasz, Thomas Inderbinen, Wouter Hogendorp, Brian McMillen, John Rogers – photography
