= Grande Terre =

Grande Terre or Grande-Terre (French, 'large land') may refer to:

== Places ==
- Grande-Terre, Guadeloupe, the eastern-half of Guadeloupe proper, in the Lesser Antilles
- Grande Terre, the main island of the Kerguelen Islands of the French Southern and Antarctic Lands
- Grande-Terre, Mayotte, the main island of the French overseas region of Mayotte in the Indian Ocean
- Grande Terre (New Caledonia), the main island of New Caledonia, a territory of France

== Music ==
- Grande-Terre (album), by Roy Hargrove's Crisol, 2024
