= Andre de Krayewski =

Polish-American painter

Andre de Krayewski (Polish: Andrzej Krajewski) (June 20, 1933 – April 10, 2018) was an artist and Polish expatriate who resided Newark, New Jersey in the United States. With a career that spanned more than half a century, he created paintings in his art-deco signature style and in pop art style.

Andre de Krayewski was best known in Poland for his movie posters, a career he began in 1965. He designed sometimes up to a dozen movie posters every year up until 1980. In 2005, de Krayewski made a comeback with the Polish theater poster for Valentine's Day.

He wrote a novel in the late 2000s, Skyliner, titled after a Charlie Barnet hit, about trying to escape from the Iron Curtain in the early 1950s.

In America, he was the official artist for the 1997 Panasonic Jazz Festival and painted the New York Film Academy painting which could be seen on countless Academy posters and ads round the nation.

He died on April 10, 2018, at the age of 84.

He married actress and pianist Jadwiga Tyszka in 1985, and the two emigrated to America.

He won many awards.
