= Moment to Moment (Roy Hargrove album) =

Studio album by Roy Hargrove
- Released: 2000
- Recorded: October 4–10, 1999
- Studios: Red Barn Studio, Big Sur, CA: Capitol Studios, Los Angeles, CA (mixing, December 1–3); The Mastering Lab, Hollywood, CA (mastering, December 14)
- Genre: Jazz
- Length: 68:34
- Labels: Verve; 314 543 540-2
- Producers: Roy Hargrove; Larry Clothier; Tommy LiPuma; Jason Olaine

Roy Hargrove chronology
Habana (1997)	Moment to Moment (2000)	Directions in Music: Live at Massey Hall (2002)

Moment to Moment is a studio album by jazz trumpeter Roy Hargrove, his only featuring string orchestra arrangements, recorded on October 4–10, 1999, and released the following year by Verve Records.

Hargrove had a long-held desire to record an album with strings, having been familiar with the string albums of singer Shirley Horn, trumpeter Clifford Brown (Clifford Brown with Strings, 1955), and vibraphonist Milt Jackson; with the right arrangers, Hargrove believed that the album could be beautiful and memorable enough to reach audiences outside of only jazz listeners.

In 2001, Hargrove was selected as a resident artist by the Montreal International Jazz Festival, and on July 7 of the same year, he performed the album with the I Musici de Montréal Chamber Orchestra.

== Reception ==
Professional ratings
Review scores
Source	Rating
All About Jazz	4.5/5 stars
AllMusic	3/5 stars
The Austin Chronicle	2.5/5 stars

All About Jazz's Mark Corroto stated, "Hargrove has reached a jazz pinnacle, his story has made the cover of jazz magazines and this With Strings record is his parade. ... A first-class recording and beautiful sound mark Hargrove's sophistication as an artist. He has painted the final scene to a very heartbreaking melancholy film in my mind."

Richard S. Ginell of AllMusic wrote, "The leadoff track 'You Go to My Head' is gorgeous; Hargrove plays soulfully and inwardly, and pianist Larry Willis's arrangement is emotionally satisfying without being cloying. However, the disc continues on and on in this fashion, one tune seeming to blend into another, one arrangement sounding like the next ... Hargrove tries his own hand at string arranging on his composition 'Natural Wonders'; the results are noticeably less sophisticated and not as richly-harmonized as the others on the disc. ... Hargrove's undoubted sincerity and musicality go only a limited distance over the 68-minute span of the CD before simply repeating themselves out."

The album received mixed reviews from The Austin Chronicle author Jay Trachtenberg, who wrote, "Hargrove, heard on both trumpet and the round-toned flugelhorn, is controlled and downright elegant; Moment to Moment provides a gorgeous soundtrack for a romantic candlelight dinner. This is all well and good, but repeated listens to the album leave one with a sense of it being little more than dispassionate, audio wallpaper."

A brief by BBC Radio 3 declared that the album proves Hargrove "is the first rank of jazz ballad players".

Doug Ramsey, writing for JazzTimes, noted of the album, "His variations maintain the mood and intent of the originals, brilliantly so on 'How Insensitive' and 'I Fall in Love Too Easily.' ... Hargrove arranged 'Natural Wonders,' which holds its own in the company of classics".

Tim Perlich of Toronto's Now newspaper described the album as "a lushly orchestrated set of romantic ballads".

In a New York Times interview with journalist Marcus J. Moore, trumpeter Ambrose Akinmusire praised the album's track "Always and Forever", commenting that it "might be the deepest ballad performance I've ever heard on trumpet", and added, "The strings are lush and not in the way – just enough to hold Roy. ... His phrasing is quiet and patient, like he's talking to himself and letting us eavesdrop. Every note holds something: pain, humor, the blues, urgency. ... That kind of vulnerability isn't always safe for us. But Roy made it cool."

== Track listing ==
No.	Title	Writer(s)	String arranger(s)	Length
1.	"You Go to My Head"	J. Fred Coots; Haven Gillespie	Larry Willis	6:06
2.	"Always and Forever"	Pat Metheny	Gil Goldstein	5:48
3.	"Natural Wonders"	Roy Hargrove		5:25
4.	"Moment to Moment"	Henry Mancini; Johnny Mercer	Willis	6:17
5.	"I'm a Fool to Want You"	Frank Sinatra; Jack Wolf; Joel Herron	Hargrove	5:51
6.	"How Insensitive"	Antônio Carlos Jobim; Vinícius de Moraes; Norman Gimbel	Goldstein	5:34
7.	"I'm Glad There Is You"	Jimmy Dorsey; Paul Madeira (Mertz)	Willis	5:57
8.	"A Time for Love"	Johnny Mandel; Paul Francis Webster	Goldstein	6:11
9.	"The Very Thought of You"	Ray Noble	Hargrove	5:57
10.	"Peri"	Gerald Cannon		5:58
11.	"I Fall in Love Too Easily"	Jule Styne; Sammy Cahn	Willis	4:07
12.	"Another Time"	Willie Jones III	Willis	5:23
Total length:				68:34

== Personnel ==
=== Musicians ===
Roy Hargrove Quintet:

- Roy Hargrove – trumpet, flugelhorn; producer, string arranging (5, 9)
- Sherman Irby – alto saxophone
- Larry Willis – piano, string arranging (1, 4, 7, 11, 12)
- Gerald Cannon – double bass
- Willie Jones III – drums

Monterey Jazz Festival Chamber Orchestra:

- Raymond Harry Brown – conductor (2, 6, 8)
- Gil Goldstein – conductor (2, 6, 8), string arranging (2, 6, 8)
- Cedar Walton – string arranging
- Susan C. Brown – concertmaster, concertmaster coordinator
- Alice Talbot, Ben Blechman, Carol Kutsch, Cynthia Baehr, Jenny Bifano, Pat Burnam, Sally Dalke – violin
- Eleanor Angel, Ken Harrison, Sarah Hart – viola
- Aria DiSalvio, Daniel Levitov, Karen Andrei, St. Bass – cello
- Stan Poplin, Tom Derthick – string bass

=== Technical ===
- Larry Clothier – producer, liner notes
- Tommy LiPuma – executive producer
- Jason Olaine – associate producer, A&R
- John Newcott, Robert Silverberg – release coordinator
- Phil Edwards, Gil Goldstein – recording engineer
- Christopher Bourke – assistant recording engineer, technician
- Doug Sax – mastering
- Al Schmitt – mixing
- Dale Fitzgerald – business production manager
- Hardgroove Ent. Inc. – management
- Philip Elwood – liner notes
- Hollis King – art direction
- Mike Piazza – photography
