= Bern (album) =

Live album by Roy Hargrove
- Released: April 18, 2026
- Recorded: May 4, 2000 in Bern, Switzerland
- Studio: The Mastering Lab (mastering)
- Genre: Jazz
- Length: 59:32
- Label: Time Traveler; TT-003
- Producer: Zev Feldman; James Batsford

Roy Hargrove chronology
Live at KNKX (2026)	Bern (2026)

Singles from Bern
- 1. "Circus" Released: February 4, 2026

Bern is a live album by trumpeter Roy Hargrove, recorded at the International Jazz Festival Bern, in Bern, Switzerland, on May 4, 2000, featuring five previously-unissued tracks. It was released by Zev Feldman's Time Traveler Recordings as an LP for Record Store Day (April 18, 2026), with CD and digital download versions available on April 24, 2026.

== Reception ==
Professional ratings
Review scores
Source	Rating
All About Jazz (Jack Kenny)	4/5 stars
All About Jazz (Pierre Giroux)	4.5/5 stars
AllMusic	4/5 stars
Audiophile Audition	4.5/5 stars
Jazzwise	4/5 stars

Jack Kenny of All About Jazz called the album "a spectacular marker of a band playing at the highest level", continuing that "This is a group entirely at ease with itself." For the same publication, Pierre Giroux characterized the recording as "the kind of archival find that reminds listeners how electrifying Roy Hargrove could be live" and that "[t]his set captures the late trumpeter in a moment of confident maturity, blending respect for tradition with the restless creativity that defined his career."

The AllMusic review by Thom Jurek stated, "Beautifully recorded, it showcases the quintet ... at full tilt, in command and control over music and audience. Hargrove proves again his deep respect for the tradition juxtaposed with his trademark creative restlessness."

Audiophile Audition noted, "The acoustics are superb, ... [t]he sound stage is impressive with Hargrove’s touring quintet of noted artists ... mixed well, and prominently featured. The five tracks are full length are each musician gets ample time to shine."

Jim Hynes of Glide Magazine named it "an exceptional performance in every way" .

Jazzwise wrote, "Very much in hard swinging, energy-boosting mode, Hargrove and a top-notch band featuring veteran pianist Larry Willis remind us what a thrill straightahead music can be when played by those with adequate skills ... [Bern is a] timely reminder of an important post-millennial player whose absence from the current scene is keenly felt."

== Track listing ==
No.	Title	Writer(s)	Length
1.	"Stranded"	Frank Lacy	16:23
2.	"Depth"	Hargrove	11:46
3.	"Never Let Me Go"	Ray Evans; Jay Livingston	11:48
4.	"Caryisms"	Hargrove	10:31
5.	"Circus"	Louis Alter; Bob Russell	9:04
Total length:			59:32

- Recorded live at the International Jazz Festival Bern, in Bern, Switzerland, on May 4, 2000

== Personnel ==
Musicians

- Roy Hargrove – trumpet, flugelhorn
- Sherman Irby – alto saxophone
- Larry Willis – piano
- Gerald Cannon – bass
- Willie Jones III – drums

Technical

- Aida Brandes-Hargrove, Lloyd Hummel – executive producer
- Zev Feldman, James Batsford – producer, photo research
- Zak Shelby-Szyszko – project assistant
- Matthew Lutthans – mastering, mixing, restoration, lacquer cutting
- Joel Weinstein – legal acumen
- Nate Chinen – liner notes
- Burton Yount – art direction, design
- Alan Nahigian – photography (cover)
- John Rogers – photography
