= Rick Germanson =

American musician

- Born: May 29, 1972 (age 53); Milwaukee, Wisconsin, U.S.
- Genres: Jazz
- Occupations: Musician, composer, arranger
- Instrument: Piano
- Years active: 1996–present
- Labels: Owl, Fresh Sound, SmallsLive, W3J
- Website: rickgermanson.com

Rick Germanson (born May 29, 1972) is an American jazz pianist from Milwaukee, Wisconsin.

== Career ==
Germanson started playing piano at a young age. After winning the grand prize at the American Piano Awards Jazz Piano Competition in 1996, he left Milwaukee for New York City.

Since 2001, Germanson has been a member of the Cannonball Legacy Band which is led by Louis Hayes, who was a drummer for Cannonball Adderley. He has toured with Pat Martino's tribute to Wes Montgomery.

He has worked with Elvin Jones Regina Carter, Tom Harrell, Slide Hampton, Frank Morgan, Eric Alexander, Frank Lacy, Marlena Shaw, Donald Harrison, Brian Lynch, Jim Rotondi, Charles McPherson, Charles Davis, Craig Handy, Cecil Payne, George Gee, Gerald Hayes, Joe Magnarelli, Ian Hendrickson-Smith, and Gerald L. Cannon.

Since 2014 Rick has been professor of jazz piano at the Jackie McLean Institute, Hartt School of Music at the University of Hartford.

== Discography ==
- Heights (Fresh Sounds, 2003)
- You Tell Me (Fresh Sounds, 2005)
- Off the Cuff (Owl, 2009)
- Live at Smalls (Smallslive, 2011)
- Turquoise Twice (WJ3, 2019)
