= Live at KNKX =

2026 live album by Roy Hargrove

Live album by Roy Hargrove
- Released: January 7, 2026
- Recorded: 2009 (track 4) & 2017 (tracks 1–3)
- Venues: KNKX studios, Seattle, Washington
- Genre: Jazz
- Length: 27:06
- Label: Roy Hargrove Legacy

Roy Hargrove chronology
Grande-Terre (2024)	Live at KNKX (2026)	Bern (2026)

Live at KNKX is an EP by trumpeter Roy Hargrove, consisting of live radio performances recorded at Seattle public radio station KNKX in 2009 and 2017, and released by KNKX on January 7, 2026.

On November 10, 2025, Roy Hargrove Legacy announced the EP, and the first track, "Top of My Head", was released as an advance single on November 21, 2025. It features three other originals, "The Seattle Vibe", "Angels", and "Soulful", none of which were included on any of Hargrove's studio albums.

== Reception ==
SoulTracks praised the EP as revealing "the artistry, emotional depth and spontaneity that made Hargrove one of the defining jazz voices of his generation".

Megan Oh of Seattle University's KXSU radio station, wrote that "These studio sessions debuted some of his original material, an instant classic that became popular in jazz scenes around the country despite being officially unreleased."

The song "Top of My Head" received significant airplay on jazz radio, drawing in a new generation of fans.

== Track listing ==
All tracks are written by Roy Hargrove.

No.	Title	Length
1.	"Top of My Head"	6:37
2.	"The Seattle Vibe"	5:45
3.	"Angels"	5:22
4.	"Soulful"	9:22
Total length:		27:06

- Recorded live at the studios of KNKX public radio, Seattle, Washington, in 2009 (track 4) and 2017 (tracks 1–3)

== Personnel ==
- Roy Hargrove – trumpet, vocals
- Justin Robinson – alto saxophone
- Ameen Saleem – bass
- Tadataka Unno (1–3), Jon Batiste (4) – piano
- Quincy Phillips (1–3), Montez Coleman (4) – drums
