= Nothing Serious (album) =

2006 studio album by Roy Hargrove

Studio album by Roy Hargrove
- Released: May 2, 2006
- Recorded: 2005
- Studios: Capitol Studios, Hollywood, CA (recording, mixing); The Mastering Lab, Hollywood, CA (mastering)
- Genres: Jazz; hard bop
- Length: 44:51
- Labels: Verve; B0006211-02
- Producers: Roy Hargrove; Larry Clothier; Dahlia Ambach Caplin

Roy Hargrove chronology
Strength (2004)	Nothing Serious (2006)	Distractions (2006)

Nothing Serious is a studio album by trumpeter Roy Hargrove, released on May 2, 2006, by Verve Records. The album was released simultaneously alongside Distractions, a recording by Hargrove's group The RH Factor.

== Reception ==
Professional ratings
Review scores
Source	Rating
All About Jazz	4.5/5 stars
AllMusic	3.5/5 stars

Russ Musto of All About Jazz wrote that Nothing Serious "may be Roy Hargrove's best disc yet", and has "beauty and drama, eliciting passionate playing from each of the group's members".

The AllMusic review by Thom Jurek stated, "This is a solid date, full of finger-popping tunes, great twists and turns and spontaneity."

JazzTimes's Andrew Lindemann Malone commented that on the album, Hargrove "gives talented musicians room to do their thing, creates a cohesive sound and (last but not least) plays his ass off on the trumpet."

Jeff McCord of Texas Monthly noted that Hargrove's "playing brims with confidence and vigor" throughout the album.

== Track listing ==
All tracks are written by Roy Hargrove except where noted.

No.	Title	Writer(s)	Length
1.	"Nothing Serious"	Leo Quintero	3:53
2.	"A Day in Vienna"	Slide Hampton	5:28
3.	"Trust"		5:26
4.	"Camaraderie"		5:00
5.	"Devil Eyes"	Dwayne Burno	5:32
6.	"The Gift"		5:53
7.	"Salima's Dance"	Ronnie Mathews	6:54
8.	"Invitation"	Bronisław Kaper; Paul Francis Webster	6:53
Total length:			44:51

Bonus track
No.	Title	Writer(s)	Length
1.	"Book's Bossa"	Cedar Walton; Walter Booker	5:58
Total length:			50:49

== Personnel ==
Musicians

- Roy Hargrove – trumpet, flugelhorn
- Justin Robinson – alto saxophone, flute
- Slide Hampton – trombone (2, 7, 8)
- Ronnie Matthews – piano
- Dwayne Burno – double bass
- Willie Jones III – drums

Technical

- Larry Clothier, Roy Hargrove – producer
- Dahlia Ambach Caplin – co-producer
- John Newcott, Kelly Pratt – release coordinator
- Al Schmitt – recording engineer, mixing
- Bill Airey Smith – assistant recording engineer
- Doug Sax, Robert Hadley – mastering
- Hollis King – art direction
- Sachico Asano – design, photography (inside background)
- Ian Gittler – photography
