= Emergence (Roy Hargrove album) =

2009 studio album by Roy Hargrove Big Band

Studio album by Roy Hargrove Big Band
- Released: August 25, 2009
- Recorded: June 16 & 17, 2008
- Studio: Capitol Studios (Studio A), Hollywood, CA; The Mastering Lab, Ojai, CA (mastering)
- Genre: Jazz; big band
- Label: EmArcy; B0013289-02
- Producer: Roy Hargrove; Larry Clothier

Roy Hargrove chronology
Earfood (2008)	Emergence (2009)	In Harmony (2021)

Emergence is a studio album by trumpeter Roy Hargrove, released on August 25, 2009, by EmArcy Records.

"There's nothing like the feeling you get when you're hearing your compositions and arrangements played by a wall of sound."

— Roy Hargrove

== Reception ==
Professional ratings
Review scores
Source	Rating
All About Jazz	4/5 stars
AllMusic	4/5 stars
The Guardian	3/5 stars

Thom Jurek of AllMusic concluded that "In all, Emergence is a stunner from top to bottom." Robert J. Robbins, writing for All About Jazz, stated: "Hargrove has been steadily accumulating big band experience in his own right since 1995,... and Emergence is therefore most aptly titled, for it represents Hargrove's full-fledged emergence into the large ensemble idiom." Journalist Josef Woodard of JazzTimes remarked, "With this new yet lived-in, road-tested and fine-sounding project, Hargrove does himself and the marginalized big-band culture a big favor." BBC Music's Martin Longley wrote, "Hargrove has sculpted a deliberately mainline repertoire that jumps from hearty swing to roseate sentimentality. It's a slick, well-balanced sound that may well find the trumpeter a fresh audience of more mainstream-inclined jazz fans."

== Track listing ==
All tracks are written and arranged by Roy Hargrove except where noted.

No.	Title	Writer(s)	Arranger	Length
1.	"Velera"			4:13
2.	"Ms. Garvey, Ms. Garvey"	Jason Marshall	Marshall	5:32
3.	"My Funny Valentine"	Richard Rodgers; Lorenz Hart	Max Seigel	6:00
4.	"Mambo for Roy"	Chucho Valdés	Valdés	6:35
5.	"Requiem"	Frank Lacy	Lacy	13:33
6.	"September in the Rain"	Harry Warren; Al Dubin	Hargrove	6:58
7.	"Everytime We Say Goodbye"	Cole Porter	Saul Rubin	5:54
8.	"La Puerta"	Luis Demetrio	Hargrove	3:27
9.	"Roy Allan"			5:49
10.	"Tschpiso"	Hargrove	Gerald Clayton	7:15
11.	"Trust"			4:25

== Personnel ==
Musicians

- Roy Hargrove – trumpet, flugelhorn, vocals
- Roberta Gambarini – vocals (7, 8)
- Bruce Williams (lead), Justin Robinson – alto saxophone, flute
- Keith Loftis, Norbert Stachel – tenor saxophone, flute
- Jason Marshall – baritone saxophone, flute
- Ambrose Akinmisure, Darren Barrett, Frank Greene, Greg Gisbert – trumpet
- Jason Jackson, Saunders Sermons, Vincent Chandler – trombone
- Max Seigel – bass trombone
- Saul Rubin – guitar
- Gerald Clayton – piano
- Danton Boller – bass
- Montez Coleman – drums
- Roland Guerrero – percussion

Technical

- Larry Clothier, Roy Hargrove – producer
- Jacques Muyal – executive producer
- Dale Fitzgerald – associate producer, liner notes
- Al Schmitt – recording engineer, mixing
- Steve Genewick – assistant engineer
- Doug Sax, Sangwook Nam – mastering
- Chris Schmitt – photography (book)
- Andrea Boccalini – photography (cover)
