= The Love Suite: In Mahogany =

2023 live album by Roy Hargrove

Live album by Roy Hargrove
- Released: October 13, 2023
- Recorded: 1993
- Venue: Alice Tully Hall, Lincoln Center, New York City
- Genre: Jazz; post-bop
- Length: 48:43
- Label: Blue Engine; BE 0049-1
- Producer: Willie Jones III

Roy Hargrove chronology
| In Harmony (2021) | The Love Suite: In Mahogany (2023) | Grande-Terre (2024) |

The Love Suite: In Mahogany is a live album by trumpeter Roy Hargrove released by Blue Engine Records for music streaming platforms on October 13, 2023. The suite, which was commissioned by Jazz at Lincoln Center to a 23-year-old Hargrove who wrote it over the course of a couple days, was first performed live by his quintet at Alice Tully Hall as part of the 1993 Jazz at Lincoln Center season; however, Hargrove would never perform the suite again in its entirety.

The suite was later arranged for a big band outfit, with the Roy Hargrove Big Band performing it in October 2024 at Lincoln Center.

== Reception ==
Nate Chinen called the album "a flat-out marvel – maybe the most vivid example we have of Roy's ability to marshal hard-bop fire in a new form, steeped in swinging tradition but sparking and crackling right now".

Craig L. Byrd of Cultural Attaché stated that "This live recording from 1993 is the only time Hargrove played The Love Suite: In Mahogany in its entirety. That alone makes this an essential album. Until you listen to it. Then you realize how truly incredible this work is."

Glide Magazine's Jim Hynes wrote: "The suite is so well executed, that it is at times breathtaking, especially the last movement, which is a 'must-hear.' It's yet another reminder of why Hargrove remains so beloved and dearly missed."

Phil Freeman of Stereogum commented: "it's lushly arranged, allowing the horns to sway around each other like trees in a breeze. ...with a rich and dramatic fanfare that moves into some almost Ellingtonian work from the whole ensemble, ...he really was an astonishing player, and this is a brilliant piece of music."

Peter Watrous, reviewing for The New York Times, was more critical of the performance, noting that "he [Hargrove] lost control of the composition, letting a light melody go to waste on an overused Latin rhythm, a long ballad stretch out too long and a blues piece suffer through too much improvisation," although, "Hargrove even scatted, a brave thing to do in the hallowed halls of art; the audience gave him a standing ovation."

The album was voted among the best Historical Albums of 2024 by DownBeat magazine.

== Track listing ==
All tracks are written by Roy Hargrove.

The Love Suite: In Mahogany
| No. | Title | Length |
|---|---|---|
| 1. | "Introduction" | 0:22 |
| 2. | "Young Daydreams (Beauteous Visions)" | 5:21 |
| 3. | "Obviously Destined" | 7:07 |
| 4. | "Stability" | 9:25 |
| 5. | "The Trial" | 3:17 |
| 6. | "Intro the Outcome" | 19:42 |
| 7. | "Outro and Band Introductions" | 3:29 |
| Total length: | | 48:43 |

- Recorded in 1993 at Alice Tully Hall as part of the Jazz at Lincoln Center season

Bonus tracks (digital only)
| No. | Title | Writer(s) | Length |
|---|---|---|---|
| 1. | "Everything I Have Is Yours" | Burton Lane; Harold Adamson |
| 2. | "My Shining Hour" | Harold Arlen; Johnny Mercer |

== Personnel ==
- Roy Hargrove – trumpet
- Jesse Davis – alto saxophone (guest)
- Andre Hayward – trombone (guest)
- Ron Blake – tenor saxophone
- Marc Cary – piano
- Rodney Whitaker – double bass
- Gregory Hutchinson – drums
- Willie Jones III – producer
