= Distractions (The RH Factor album) =

2006 studio album by The RH Factor

Studio album by The RH Factor
- Released: May 2, 2006
- Studio: Paramount Studios, Hollywood, CA; The Plant Studios, Sausalito, CA
- Genre: Jazz; funk; hip-hop
- Length: 37:58
- Label: Verve; B0005987-02
- Producer: Roy Hargrove; Dahlia Ambach Caplin; D'Angelo; Russell Elevado

Roy Hargrove chronology
Nothing Serious (2006)	Distractions (2006)	Earfood (2008)

Distractions is a studio album by American trumpeter Roy Hargrove and his group The RH Factor, released by Verve Records on May 2, 2006.

== Reception ==
Professional ratings
Review scores
Source	Rating
All About Jazz	2.5/5 stars
AllMusic	3.5/5 stars
The Guardian	2/5 stars

All About Jazz was critical of the album, writing that it "basically offers two solid pieces: the title track..., and the track with D'Angelo", with the rest as "limpid music that's not quite jazz or funk".

The AllMusic review by Thom Jurek called it a "deeply gratifying, fun, and in-the-pocket album", with "a much more urban soul feel to this date".

John L. Walters of The Guardian was similarly critical, stating, "The appropriately named Distractions is a dog's dinner of a crossover album ... [it] is one of those albums that appeals less the more you listen to it."

JazzEcho described the majority of the twelve tracks as "inspired, reflective vocal pieces".

== Track listing ==
All tracks are written by Roy Hargrove except where noted.

No.	Title	Writer(s)	Length
1.	"Distractions (Intro)"		1:19
2.	"Crazy Race"		2:23
3.	"Kansas City Funk"		2:22
4.	"On the One"	Renée Neufville	4:59
5.	"Family"	Roy Hargrove; Neufville	5:43
6.	"Distractions, Pt. 2"		0:20
7.	"A Place"	Hargrove; Neufville	4:22
8.	"Hold On"	Hargrove; Neufville	3:53
9.	"Bull***t"	D'Angelo	4:57
10.	"Distractions, Pt. 3"		0:42
11.	"Can't Stop"		2:48
12.	"Distractions, Pt. 4"		4:10
Total length:			37:58

== Personnel ==
Musicians

- Roy Hargrove – trumpet, flugelhorn, vocals, clapping
- D'Angelo – vocals (9)
- Renée Neufville – vocals, keyboards, Wurlitzer electronic piano, clapping
- Keith Anderson – saxophone
- David "Fathead" Newman – saxophone, flute, clapping; (1–6, 8, 10–12)
- Todd Parsnow – guitar, clapping
- Bobby Sparks – piano, organ, keyboards, Rhodes piano, Moog synthesizer, Clavinet, clapping
- Charles McCampbell – piano, organ, keyboards (Roland XP-80), Rhodes piano, Clavinet, clapping, vocals
- Lenny Stallworth, Reggie Washington – bass, clapping
- Jason Thomas – drums
- Willie Jones III – drums, clapping

Technical

- Roy Hargrove, Dahlia Ambach Caplin, D'Angelo (9) – producer
- Russell Elevado – producer, recording engineer, mixing
- Tony Rambo – recording engineer
- Justin Lieberman, Rachel Allgood, Robert Gatley – assistant recording engineer
- Ben Kane, Steef Van De Gevel – assistant mixing
- Chris Gehringer – mastering
- Evelyn Morgan – A&R
- John Newcott, Kelly Pratt – release coordinator
- Hollis King – art direction
- Ian Gittler – photography
