= Roy Hargrove =

American jazz trumpeter (1969–2018)

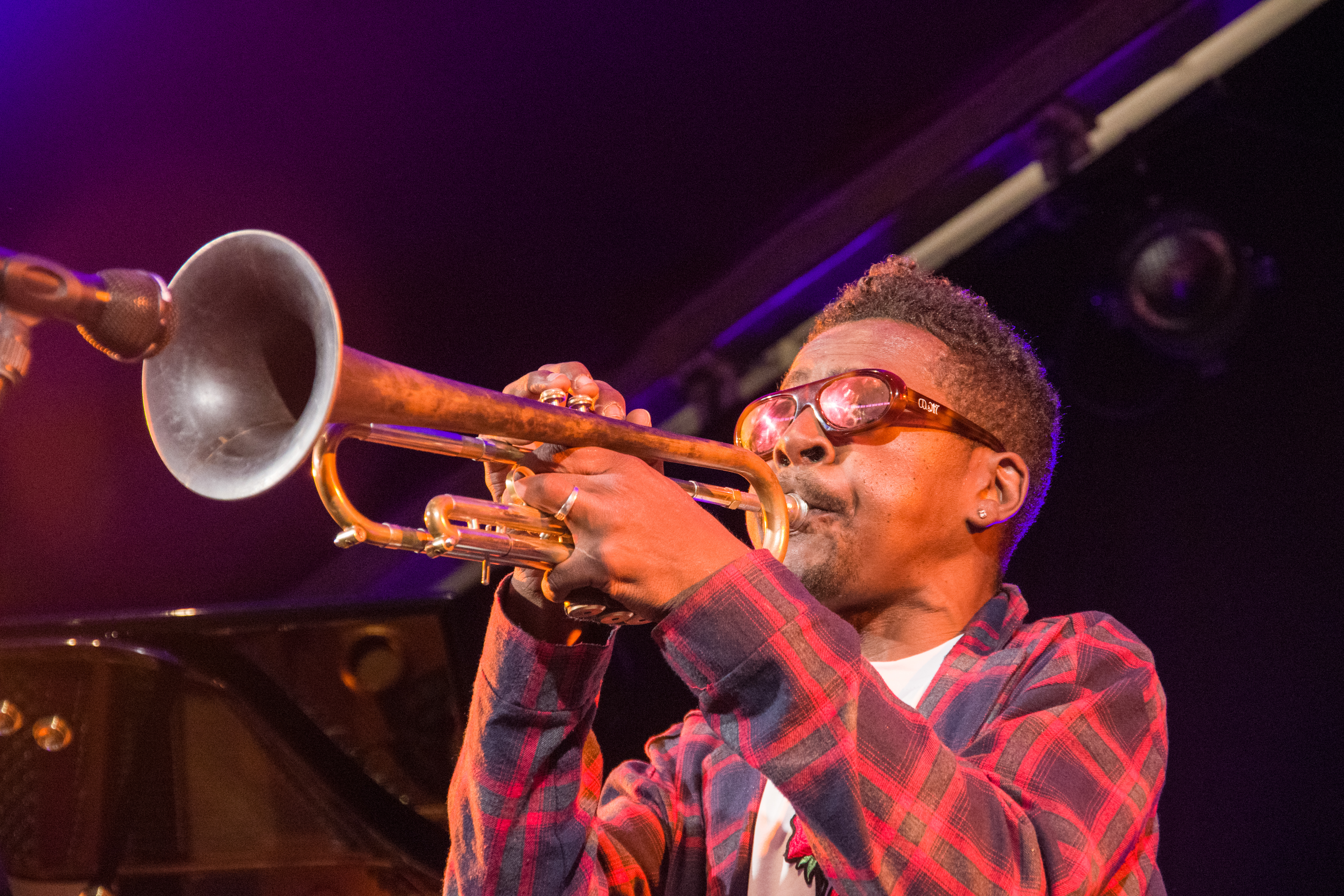
- Hargrove in 2018

Background information
- Born: Roy Anthony Hargrove; October 16, 1969; Waco, Texas, U.S.
- Died: November 2, 2018 (aged 49) New York City, U.S.
- Genres: Jazz; Latin jazz; M-Base; soul
- Occupations: Musician; bandleader; composer
- Instruments: Trumpet; flugelhorn; vocals
- Works: Discography
- Years active: 1987–2018
- Formerly of: The Roy Hargrove Quintet; The Roy Hargrove Big Band; Roy Hargrove's Crisol; The Jazz Futures; The Jazz Networks; The RH Factor; Jimmy Cobb's Quartet; Buckshot LeFonque; Soulquarians
- Website: www.royhargroveofficial.com

Roy Anthony Hargrove (October 16, 1969 – November 2, 2018) was an American jazz musician and composer whose principal instruments were the trumpet and flugelhorn. He achieved critical acclaim in the early 1990s and won two Grammy Awards for differing styles of jazz in 1998 and 2002. Hargrove primarily played in the hard bop style for the majority of his albums but also had a penchant for genre-crossing exploration and collaboration with a variety of hip-hop, neo soul, R&B, and alternative rock artists. As Hargrove told one reporter, "I've been around all kinds of musicians, and if a cat can play, a cat can play. If it's gospel, funk, R&B, jazz or hip-hop, if it's something that gets in your ear and it's good, that's what matters."

== Biography ==
=== Early life and career ===
Hargrove was born in Waco, Texas, United States, to Roy Allan Hargrove and Jacklyn Hargrove. At age nine, his family moved to Dallas, Texas. He took lessons at school initially on cornet before turning to the trumpet. One of Hargrove's most profound early influences was saxophonist David "Fathead" Newman, a sideman in Ray Charles's band, who performed at Hargrove's junior high school and mesmerized him with his improvisational skills. Dean Hill, a renowned Dallas-based musician and school band director whom Hargrove called his "musical father", taught him to improvise and solo. Hargrove was discovered by Wynton Marsalis when Marsalis was visiting the Booker T. Washington High School for the Performing and Visual Arts in Dallas, where Hargrove played in various school ensembles. Hargrove credited trumpeter Freddie Hubbard as having the greatest influence on his sound.

Hargrove continued his musical studies at Boston's Berklee College of Music, but soon transferred to The New School in New York, enabling him to frequent the Greenwich Village jazz clubs and participate in jam-sessions, most notably at Bradley's, where he played alongside many of his mentors and heroes. Hargrove's first studio recording session was in April 1988 with the band Superblue featuring Bobby Watson (American musician), Mulgrew Miller, Frank Lacy, Don Sickler, and Kenny Washington.. Five days later, Hargrove joined Watson again to record Watson's album No Question About It.

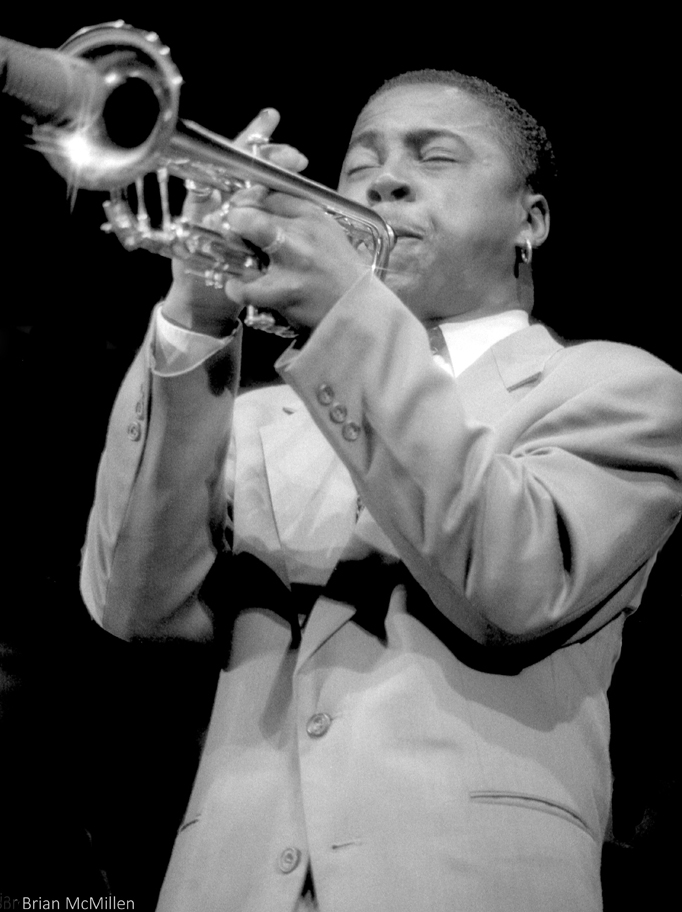
Hargrove at Monterey Jazz Festival, 1992

Hargrove's debut album as leader, Diamond in the Rough, was released on the Novus/RCA label in 1990. That album, and the three succeeding recordings Hargrove produced for Novus with his quintet, were among the most commercially successful jazz recordings of the early 1990s and made him one of jazz's in-demand players; his third album, The Vibe (Roy Hargrove album) was released in 1992 and peaked at number 2 on Billboard's Jazz Albums chart. Hargrove's burgeoning fame also propelled him to his first live national television performance in June 1992 on The Tonight Show with Jay Leno. It was during this time that Hargrove topped the category "Rising Star – Trumpet" in the DownBeat Critics' Poll in 1991, 1992, and 1993 and became associated with the "Young Lions", a group of rising jazz musicians – including, among others, Marcus Roberts, Mark Whitfield, and Christian McBride – who, embracing the foundations of jazz, played principally bebop, hard bop and the Great American Songbook standards. Hargrove and other of the "Young Lions" formed the Jazz Futures, which released one critically acclaimed album, Live in Concert, before returning to their respective solo careers.

As a side project to his solo and quintet recordings, Hargrove also was the leader of the Jazz Networks, an ensemble of American and Japanese musicians that released five albums between 1992 and 1996 and featured other notable jazz artists, including Antonio Hart, Rodney Whitaker, and Joshua Redman. The group's albums were originally released in Japan and Europe only, but following Hargrove's death, his estate arranged for their release on US music streaming platforms. During this period, Hargrove also participated in several one-off ensemble recordings, including the albums New York Stories, featuring Danny Gatton and Bobby Watson, and Pride of Lions, featuring Philip Bailey, Billy Childs, and Tony Williams.

=== Verve and EmArcy era ===
In 1994, Hargrove left Novus for Verve Records and recorded With the Tenors of Our Time, featuring Joe Henderson, Stanley Turrentine, Johnny Griffin, Joshua Redman, and Branford Marsalis. Hargrove's second album for Verve, Family, included his original song "Roy Allan", dedicated to his father, which has since been covered by several other jazz artists. That same year, in 1995, he experimented with a trio format on Parker's Mood, an album recorded with bassist Christian McBride and pianist Stephen Scott and presenting the music of Charlie Parker. The Penguin Guide to Jazz identified Parker's Mood as one of the "1001 Best Albums" in the history of the genre. Hargrove also appeared on a tribute album to Miles Davis for Fantasy Records along with Ron Carter, the bassist in one of Davis's classic quintets, and drummer Ed Thigpen, known especially for his work with Oscar Peterson, among others.

Also in 1995, Hargrove formed the Roy Hargrove Big Band to perform at the Panasonic Village Jazz Festival in New York. The band would go on to record and perform worldwide and feature big band arrangements of Hargrove's own compositions as well as his favorite songs by respected contemporaries. Their only album as a group, 2009's Emergence, was recorded at Capitol Studios in Los Angeles by the engineer Al Schmitt.

As Hargrove toured more broadly outside the US, his popularity grew, especially in Europe, Japan, and Latin America. In 1997, the Dutch public television station Nederlandse Programma Stichting (now NTR) aired the documentary Jazzportret: Roy Hargrove directed by Hans Hylkema, a Dutch filmmaker known for music documentaries. It features extensive selections from Hargrove's live performance at the North Sea Jazz Festival in the Hague in 1996 as well as interviews with Hargrove, his mother, managers, and the music teachers in Dallas who guided him.

In 1998, Hargrove won the Grammy Award for Best Latin Jazz Album for Habana with Roy Hargrove's Crisol ('melting pot', in Spanish), an ensemble of Cuban and American musicians that included Chucho Valdés, Russell Malone, Frank Lacy, Jose Luis "Changuito" Quintana, and Miguel "Angá" Díaz, among others. That same year, Hargrove sat for an extended interview and performed duets with host Marian McPartland on her NPR program Piano Jazz. Hargrove recounted his Texas upbringing, his fascination with his father's cornet, his early influences, thoughts about arranging, and more; the program also includes a rare performance by Hargrove, on piano, of his composition "Ballad for the Children".

Throughout the late 1990s and early 2000s, Hargrove collaborated with the Soulquarians, a collective of experimental jazz, hip-hop, and soul artists that included Questlove, D'Angelo, J Dilla, and others. Hargrove added jazz and funk-influenced horns to D'Angelo's Grammy-winning album Voodoo and supported D'Angelo on tour as a member of The Soultronics, a backing "supergroup" featuring Questlove and Pino Palladino. That same year, as part of the Soulquarians collective, Hargrove contributed horn performances for recordings by Common and Erykah Badu.

Also in 2000, as part of the Verizon Jazz Festival, Hargrove performed in Roz Nixon's musical production Dedicated to Louis Armstrong and released his first and only album backed by a string section, Moment to Moment, featuring accompaniment by the Monterey Jazz Festival Chamber Orchestra.

In 2001, Hargrove participated in a special four-night artist "Invitation Series" at the Montreal International Jazz Festival during which he performed in five different ensembles: as leader of his own quintet; as leader of a "special trio" with Christian McBride and Russell Malone; as a sideman with Monty Alexander and his band; with McBride in a duet; and with the I Musici de Montréal Chamber Orchestra, with which he performed his album, Moment to Moment.

In 2002, Hargrove won his second Grammy for Best Jazz Instrumental Album for Directions in Music: Live at Massey Hall with co-leaders Herbie Hancock and Michael Brecker. Hargrove was nominated for four other Grammy Awards during his career.

Also in 2002, Hargrove collaborated with D'Angelo, Macy Gray, The Soultronics, and Nile Rodgers on two tracks for Red Hot + Riot: The Music and Spirit of Fela Kuti, a compilation album in tribute to the music of afrobeat pioneer Fela Kuti. He also acted as a sideman for jazz vocalist/pianist Shirley Horn and supported singer Erykah Badu on her album Worldwide Underground.

From 2003 to 2006, he released three albums as the leader of Roy Hargrove's The RH Factor, a group that blended jazz, soul, hip-hop and funk idioms. The band featured a fluid, rotating collective of prominent jazz, R&B, and hip-hop musicians, including among others Bobby Sparks, Renee Neufville, Keith Anderson, Jason "JT" Thomas, Reggie Washington, Todd Parsnow, Willie Jones III, Jason Marshall, Jon Batiste, Chalmers Alford, Jacques Schwarz-Bart and Cornell Dupree. Their debut album, Hard Groove, was hailed as "genre-busting" by critics and ushered in a new era of hip hop-accented jazz. The band's second release, Strength, was nominated for a Grammy Award for "Best Contemporary Jazz Album".

During this same 2003 to 2006 period, Hargrove also moonlighted as a sideman on the albums Heavier Things (2003) and Continuum (John Mayer album) (2006) by John Mayer and released his final quintet album for Verve, Nothing Serious (album). The AllMusic guide characterized the latter as "full of finger-popping tunes, great twists and turns and spontaneity." "Nothing Serious" also introduced Hargrove's song "Trust," which has since become his most streamed original composition (at over 25 million streams) on Spotify.

In 2007, Hargrove participated as a sideman in the first of two albums he recorded with Jimmy Cobb's Quartet, Cobb's Corner, a collection of 10 standards including "Never Let Me Go", a song that Hargrove often played in live performances. Two years later, Hargrove supported Cobb again on the album Jazz in the Key of Blue, another collection of standards, this time also featuring Russell Malone on guitar.

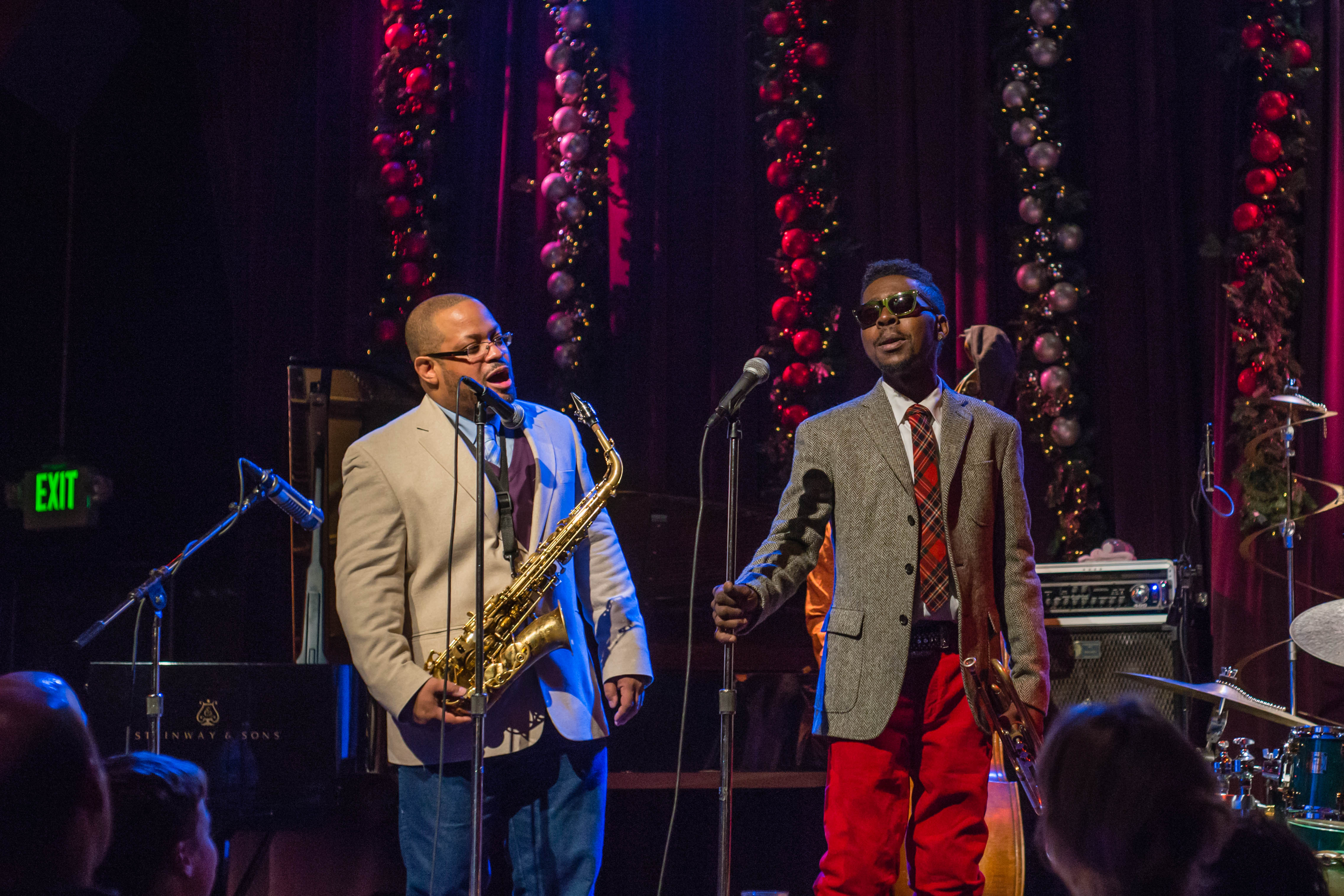
Hargrove with his quintet, including Justin Robinson (left), at Dimitriou's Jazz Alley, Seattle, in 2012

After signing with Universal/EmArcy in 2008, Hargrove released Earfood, a quintet recording "steeped in tradition and sophistication", which JazzTimes selected as one of the top 50 albums of that year. He followed in 2009 with Emergence, an album recorded with the Roy Hargrove Big Band; he received a Grammy nomination for "Best Improvised Jazz Solo" for his performance on the track "Ms. Garvey, Ms. Garvey" on that record. In 2010, Hargrove released Live at the New Morning, a DVD of an intimate club performance with his quintet in Paris. Thereafter, until his death in 2018, Hargrove did not release another album as a leader but toured extensively and appeared as a sideman on recordings by Jimmy Cobb, Roy Haynes, Cyrille Aimée, The 1975, D'Angelo, Johnny O'Neal, Kandace Springs and others. Hargrove told KNKX radio in 2017 that recording albums no longer made "financial sense".

=== Posthumous career ===
In July 2021, Hargrove's estate released via Resonance Records the double-album In Harmony, a live duet recording made in 2006 and 2007 with pianist Mulgrew Miller that returned Hargrove to the Top 5 of the Billboard jazz chart. Slate selected In Harmony as one of the best jazz albums of 2021. The Académie du Jazz awarded In Harmony its prize for "Best Reissue or Best Unpublished" album of 2021.JazzTimes noted that "a sense of irrepressible playfulness makes itself felt [on the recording], as trumpeter and pianist toss ideas back and forth like ballplayers in a round of pepper: every moment new and sparkling, celebrating a brotherhood of the spirit bonded by joy, deepened by inspiration, and anointed with love."

Hargrove was posthumously elected to DownBeat magazine's "Jazz Hall of Fame" in November 2021.

In June 2022, the documentary Hargrove, filmed during the final year of his life, debuted at the Tribeca Festival. Hargrove's estate issued a statement objecting to the film as not what he had envisioned when agreeing to participate. Rio Sakairi, Artistic Director of New York's "The Jazz Gallery", an art and performance space that Hargrove co-founded in 1995, also issued a statement objecting to accusations made in the film about Hargrove's managers.

Also in 2022, the French label Heavenly Sweetness released a 2009 live recording of Hargrove and the RH Factor's performance of "I'll Stay" as part of the compilation album "Jazz à Vienne: Past & Future."

Celebrating the 30th anniversary of its performance, in October 2023, Jazz at Lincoln Center released a live recording of Hargrove's original composition The Love Suite: In Mahogany, a five-movement piece that he did not play again live after its debut performance in 1993. Jazziz Magazine called the album an "unearthed gem" that "showcases the much-missed trumpeter’s virtuosity and soulful songwriting". Jazz critic Nate Chinen of NPR applauded the album as "a flat-out marvel — maybe the most vivid example we have of Roy's ability to marshal hard-bop fire in a new form, steeped in swinging tradition but sparking and crackling right now".

In September 2024, Verve Records announced the release of a previously-unheard archival album titled Grande-Terre by Roy Hargrove's Crisol that had been recorded back in 1998. Music critic Sharonne Cohen of Everything Jazz praised the recording, noting that "Grande-Terre brims with Crisol's intricate and sophisticated arrangements, Hargrove's explosive, imaginative and soul-stirring playing, and the band's powerful, singular sound." The New York Times was equally effusive about the album, noting that it "shows off the high-wire, from-the-gut jazz Hargrove played most nights of his life". NPR Music included Grande-Terre among its "50 Best Albums of 2024", comparing it favorably to its predecessor Habana as "an even more fluent and focused celebration of Afro-Cuban musical lineage, with Hargrove and his Crisol band both in exceptionally strong form".

In November 2025, Roy Hargrove Legacy announced the release of Live at KNKX, an EP of live radio performances by Hargrove's quintet recorded at Seattle's public radio station KNKX in 2009 and 2017. The EP features four Hargrove originals, including "Top of My Head", which was also issued as an advance single; none of the tracks had been included on any of Hargrove's studio albums. SoulTracks praised the EP as revealing "the artistry, emotional depth and spontaneity that made Hargrove one of the defining jazz voices of his generation." "Top of My Head" received significant airplay on jazz radio.

On April 18, 2026, via Time Traveler Recordings, the Hargrove estate released Bern, an archival recording made in May 2000 capturing Roy and his quintet live at the International Jazz Festival Bern. Released as a special vinyl offering for Record Store Day, the album highlights the signature alchemy that Roy and his then-bandmates Sherman Irby, Larry Willis, Gerald Cannon, and Willie Jones III brought to the stage. Pierre Giroux of All About Jazz characterized the recording as "the kind of archival find that reminds listeners how electrifying Roy Hargrove could be live. This set captures the late trumpeter in a moment of confident maturity, blending respect for tradition with the restless creativity that defined his career." AllMusic gave the album a 4-star rating, noting that "The brilliant, high-energy performance and fantastic sound quality reveal yet another dimension of Hargrove's unexaggerated genius."

In July 2026, Verve re-released worldwide on streaming platforms a 1995 promotional CD single of "Roy Allan (DJ Krush Remix)", previously only available in Japan. The release also includes two studio recordings by Hargrove not included on any of his albums: "Tom Kat" and "Stairway to the Stars."

In October 2026, for the first time on digital platforms worldwide, the Hargrove estate and Verve released rare 2003 remixes of two RH Factor tracks, "Poetry" and "Forget Regret," by DJ Spinna and Quantic that had previously been available in physical formats in Europe only for promotional purposes.

== Influence ==
Hargrove's influence on music has extended well beyond his passing. A year after his death, in 2019, he again topped the trumpet category in the DownBeat Readers' Poll.

In addition to the accolades he garnered on trumpet, music critics praised Hargrove's tone on flugelhorn and his gifted ways with a ballad. As the Chicago Tribune observed in 2010, "it's Hargrove's ballad playing that tends to win hearts, which is what happened every time he picked up his flugelhorn. We've been hearing Hargrove spin silk on this instrument for a couple of decades now, yet one still marvels at the poetry of his tone, the incredible slowness of his vibrato and the arching lyricism of his phrases."

Over his 30-year career, Hargrove composed and recorded several original compositions, some of which, including most notably "Strasbourg-St. Denis", "Top of My Head," "Roy Allan" and "Soulful" have been characterized as reaching the status of a jazz standard.

Hargrove's continuing influence is underscored in a recent New York Times feature about his legacy. There, 13 contemporary musicians describe their favorite Hargrove compositions that left a lasting imprint upon them.

== Personal life and death ==
A quiet and retiring person in life, Hargrove struggled with kidney failure and substance abuse. He died at the age of 49 of cardiac arrest brought on by kidney disease on November 2, 2018, while hospitalized in New Jersey. According to his long-time manager Larry Clothier, Hargrove had been on dialysis for the last 14 years of his life.

Hargrove met his wife, Aida Brandes-Hargrove, in 2006 when working with jazz trombonist Slide Hampton; she was the daughter of one of Hampton's close friends. In 2020, Brandes-Hargrove and daughter Kamala Hargrove launched the company Roy Hargrove Legacy LLC to preserve and extend his legacy. In 2022, Roy Hargrove Legacy re-formed the Roy Hargrove Big Band, which gives live performances featuring original band members and other musicians who supported Hargrove in his various ensembles. In 2026, Roy Hargrove Legacy also re-formed The RH Factor for a series of live performances, including at the North Sea Jazz Festival in Rotterdam.

== Selected discography ==
- 1989–1990: Diamond in the Rough (Novus/RCA, 1990)
- 1991: Public Eye (Novus/RCA, 1991)
- 1992: The Vibe (Novus/RCA, 1992)
- 1993: Of Kindred Souls (Novus/RCA, 1993)
- 1993–1994: Approaching Standards (Novus/RCA/BMG, 1994) – compilation of tracks from 4 albums
- 1994: The Roy Hargrove Quintet, With the Tenors of Our Time (Verve, 1994)
- 1995: Family (Verve, 1995)
- 1995: Parker's Mood with Christian McBride, Stephen Scott (Verve, 1995)
- 1997: Roy Hargrove's Crisol, Habana (Verve, 1997) – Latin Jazz Grammy Winner
- 1999: Roy Hargrove with Strings, Moment to Moment (Verve, 2000)
- 2001: Directions in Music: Live at Massey Hall with Herbie Hancock, Michael Brecker (Verve, 2002) – live; won Grammy Award for Best Jazz Instrumental Album, Individual or Group, in 2003
- 2003: The RH Factor, Hard Groove (Verve, 2003)
- 2004: The RH Factor, Strength EP (Verve, 2004) – includes unreleased Hard Groove (2003) sessions
- 2005: Nothing Serious (Verve, 2006) – promo version released in 2005
- 2006: The RH Factor, Distractions (Verve, 2006)[CD]
- 2008: The Roy Hargrove Quintet, Earfood (EmArcy, 2008)
- 2009: The Roy Hargrove Big Band, Emergence (Universal/Emarcy, 2009)
- 2010: The Roy Hargrove Quintet, Live at the New Morning (Universal/Emarcy, 2010)[DVD-Video]

Posthumous releases

- In Harmony with Mulgrew Miller (Resonance, 2021) – live recorded in 2006–2007
- The Love Suite: In Mahogany (Blue Engine, 2023) – recorded in 1993
- Roy Hargrove's Crisol, Grande-Terre (Verve, 2024) – recorded in 1998
- Live at KNKX (Roy Hargrove Legacy, 2026)[EP] – live recorded in 2009 and 2017
- Bern (Time Traveler Recordings, 2026) – live recorded in 2000
