= With the Tenors of Our Time =

1994 studio album by Roy Hargrove

Studio album by Roy Hargrove
- Released: May 1994
- Recorded: December 28, 1993 (tracks 2 & 6); January 16–17, 1994
- Studio: Teatro Mancinelli, Orvieto, Italy (tracks 2 & 6); Clinton Recording Studio, NYC (recording and mixing)
- Genre: Jazz; post-bop
- Length: 72:41
- Label: Verve; 523 019-2
- Producer: Roy Hargrove; Larry Clothier

Roy Hargrove chronology
Approaching Standards (1994)	With the Tenors of Our Time (1994)	Family (1995)

With the Tenors of Our Time is a studio album by trumpeter Roy Hargrove, released by Verve Records in May 1994. It features Hargrove and his quintet—Ron Blake, Cyrus Chestnut, Rodney Whitaker, and Gregory Hutchinson—playing with veteran saxophonists Stanley Turrentine, Johnny Griffin, Branford Marsalis, Joe Henderson, and Joshua Redman.

== Reception ==
Professional ratings
Review scores
Source	Rating
AllMusic	4.5/5 stars
Los Angeles Times	4/5 stars
The Penguin Guide to Jazz Recordings	3.5/4 stars
The Rolling Stone Album Guide	3/5 stars

The Penguin Guide to Jazz Recordings noted that "The debut [on Verve] was no masterwork, but the trumpeter rises to the challenge of having five grandmasters sit in. [...] The trumpeter plays with fresh resolve throughout, and his flugelhorn solo on 'Never Let Me Go' is a quiet showstopper." The AllMusic review by Scott Yanow stated: "Everyone fares well, including Hargrove's group... The young trumpeter (who is vying for Lee Morgan's unoccupied chair) keeps up with the saxophonists on this generally relaxed affair; recommended for hard bop fans." Zan Stewart, for the Los Angeles Times, wrote: "He exhibits the kind of maturity and high musicality that his chief influence, Freddie Hubbard, did at the same age. [...] There are no throwaway notes, no forgettable compositions."

== Track listing ==
All tracks are written by Roy Hargrove except where noted.

No.	Title	Writer(s)	Guest artist	Length
1.	"Soppin' the Biscuit"		Stanley Turrentine	7:58
2.	"When We Were One"	Johnny Griffin	Griffin	5:54
3.	"Valse Hot"	Sonny Rollins	Branford Marsalis	6:56
4.	"Once Forgotten"	Pamela Watson		5:44
5.	"Shade of Jade"	Joe Henderson	Henderson	5:23
6.	"Greens at the Chicken Shack"	Cyrus Chestnut	Griffin	5:44
7.	"Never Let Me Go"	Jay Livingston; Ray Evans		5:34
8.	"Serenity"	Henderson	Henderson	5:34
9.	"Across the Pond"		Joshua Redman	6:47
10.	"Wild Is Love"	Raymond Rasch	Turrentine	6:48
11.	"Mental Phrasing"		Redman	6:25
12.	"April's Fool"	Ron Blake		3:54
Total length:				72:41

== Personnel ==
Musicians

- Roy Hargrove – trumpet, flugelhorn (2, 4, 7, 10), production
- Ron Blake – soprano saxophone, tenor saxophone (1, 3, 4, 5, 6, 11)
- Cyrus Chestnut – piano
- Rodney Whitaker – doublebass
- Gregory Hutchinson – drums
- Stanley Turrentine (1, 10), Johnny Griffin (2, 6), Branford Marsalis (3), Joe Henderson (5, 8), Joshua Redman (9, 11) – tenor saxophone

Technical

- Larry Clothier – producer, recording engineer (2, 6), mixing (1, 3, 4, 5, 7–12)
- Richard Seidel – executive producer
- Camille Tominaro – production coordinator
- Ed Rak – recording engineer & mixing (1, 3, 4, 5, 7–12), mastering
- Robert Friedrich – assistant recording engineer & assistant mixing (1, 3, 4, 5, 7–12)
- Troy Halderson – mastering
- Hardgroove Ent. Inc. – management
- Dott. Giampiero Berti, Dott. Gianni Grassilli – music consultant (technical and audio) (2, 6)
- Ben Mundy – Verve product manager
- Bob Blumenthal – sleeve notes
- David Lau – art direction, design
- James Minchin – photography (cover, back, and inlay)
- Jimmy Katz – photography (liner)
- Nelly Muganda – hair stylist, make-up
