= Directions in Music: Live at Massey Hall =

2002 live album by Herbie Hancock, Michael Brecker & Roy Hargrove

Live album by Herbie Hancock, Michael Brecker & Roy Hargrove
- Released: May 2002
- Recorded: October 25, 2001
- Venue: Massey Hall, Toronto, Canada
- Studio: See list: Wonderland, Nyack, NY; January 27 & 28, February 1, 3, & 4, 2002 (editing); Avatar Studios, NYC, February 6 & 7, 2002 (mixing); Sterling Sound, NYC, February 15, 2002 (mastering)
- Genre: Jazz; post-bop
- Length: 78:22
- Label: Verve; 314 589 654-2
- Producer: Herbie Hancock; Michael Brecker; Jason Olaine; Todd Fraracci

Herbie Hancock chronology
Future 2 Future (2001)	Directions in Music: Live at Massey Hall (2002)	Possibilities (2005)

Michael Brecker chronology
Nearness of You: The Ballad Book (2001)	Directions in Music: Live at Massey Hall (2002)	American Dreams (2002)

Roy Hargrove chronology
Moment to Moment (2000)	Directions in Music: Live at Massey Hall (2002)	Hard Groove (2003)

Directions in Music: Live at Massey Hall (subtitled, Celebrating Miles Davis & John Coltrane) is a live album by pianist Herbie Hancock, tenor saxophonist Michael Brecker, and trumpeter Roy Hargrove. It was recorded on October 25, 2001, in Toronto, and was Hancock's forty-fourth and Brecker's eighth album. The band is rounded out by bassist John Patitucci and drummer Brian Blade.

The album won the Grammy Award for Best Jazz Instrumental Album, Individual or Group in 2003; the track "My Ship" won the Grammy for Best Jazz Instrumental Solo that same year.

== Reception ==
Professional ratings
Review scores
Source	Rating
AllMusic	4/5 stars
The Penguin Guide to Jazz Recordings	3/4 stars

Richard S. Ginell of AllMusic wrote: "While this quintet does not kick over old boundaries, it does make good, uncompromisingly intelligent music." JazzTimes's Bill Shoemaker noted that "The quintet neither plays it safe, which they arguably do on Kurt Weill's 'My Ship,' nor attempts to reinvent the wheel, which Brecker does with mixed results in his arch unaccompanied take on 'Naima.' [...] The bottom line is that Hancock, Brecker and Hargrove take real risks in the program, and some of them pay off handsomely."

== Track listing ==
No.	Title	Writer(s)	Length
1.	"The Sorcerer"	Herbie Hancock	8:54
2.	"The Poet"	Roy Hargrove	6:35
3.	"So What" / "Impressions"	Miles Davis / John Coltrane	12:51
4.	"Misstery"	Michael Brecker; Hancock; Hargrove	8:16
5.	"Naima"	Coltrane	7:29
6.	"Transition"	Coltrane	10:26
7.	"My Ship"	Kurt Weill; Ira Gershwin	8:40
8.	"D Trane"	Brecker	15:11
Total length:			78:22

== Personnel ==
Musicians

- Herbie Hancock – piano
- Michael Brecker – tenor saxophone
- Roy Hargrove – trumpet, flugelhorn (2, 7)
- John Patitucci – double bass
- Brian Blade – drums

Technical personnel

- Herbie Hancock – executive producer
- Michael Brecker – producer
- Jason Olaine – co-producer
- Todd Fraracci – producer
- Scott Southard – concept management
- Doug Doctor, Rob Griffin – recording engineer
- Anthony Ruotolo – assistant recording engineer
- Frank Finistauri –audio systems engineer
- Jay Newland – mixing
- Greg Calbi – mastering at Sterling Sound, New York City, USA
- George Whitty – editing
