= Parker's Mood (album) =

1995 studio album by Roy Hargrove, Christian McBride & Stephen Scott

Studio album by Roy Hargrove, Christian McBride & Stephen Scott Trio
- Released: 1995
- Recorded: April 12–14, 1995
- Studio: Effanel Music Studio, NYC; Foothill Digital, NYC (mastering)
- Genre: Jazz; post-bop
- Length: 64:26
- Label: Verve; 314 527 907-2
- Producer: Don Sickler; Richard Seidel

Roy Hargrove chronology
Family (1995)	Parker's Mood (1995)	Habana (1997)

Christian McBride chronology
Gettin' to It (1994)	Parker's Mood (1995)	Number Two Express (1995)

Stephen Scott chronology
Renaissance (1994)	Parker's Mood (1995)	Beautiful Thing (1996)

Parker's Mood is a studio album by trumpeter Roy Hargrove, bassist Christian McBride, and pianist Stephen Scott, recorded on April 12–14, 1995, and released the same year by Verve Records. The album was produced in memoriam of saxophonist Charlie Parker, who either wrote or was known for performing all of the songs on the album, recorded on his 75th anniversary year.

== Reception ==
Professional ratings
Review scores
Source	Rating
AllMusic	4/5 stars
The Penguin Guide to Jazz Recordings	3.5/4 stars
The Rolling Stone Album Guide	5/5 stars

Rick Anderson of AllMusic wrote, "These three musicians, all of whom are part of the back-to-bop youth movement and all of whom have made names for themselves as session players and fledgling bandleaders, approach the tunes with a combination of reverence and iconoclastic innovation", continuing that "This approach has its limitations, of course; as revealing as Hargrove's solo take on 'Dewey Square' is, sometimes the weight of rhythmic responsibility weighs too heavily on McBride's shoulders during the trio numbers, and the groove suffers."

The Penguin Guide to Jazz Recordings stated that the album is "a delightful meeting of three young masters, improvising on 16 themes from Bird's repertoire" with "Hargrove's luminous treatment of 'Laura' again suggests he may be turning into one of the music's pre-eminent ballad players, but it's the inventive interplay between the three men that takes the session to its high level."

The Rolling Stone Album Guide described the album as "about as focused as you can get, showing how a decade of seasoning has matured and centered these musicians", adding that "All three players handle Parker's rocky terrain with fleet agility, Hargrove assaying Bird's lines on his horn as if they were made for trumpet" and "The antithesis of everything that precedes it, this collection of jazz masterpieces by a jazz master represents the apex of Hargrove's output."

== Track listing ==
All tracks are written by Charlie Parker except where noted.

No.	Title	Writer(s)	Ensemble notes	Length
1.	"Klactoveesedstene"			4:39
2.	"Parker's Mood"			4:19
3.	"Marmaduke"		with muted trumpet	3:22
4.	"Steeplechase"		with bowed bass	4:22
5.	"Laura"	David Raksin; Johnny Mercer		5:08
6.	"Dexterity"		with muted trumpet	5:00
7.	"Yardbird Suite"			3:54
8.	"Red Cross"		solo bass	2:07
9.	"Repetition"	Neal Hefti		6:37
10.	"Laird Baird"		piano and bass duet	4:04
11.	"Dewey Square"			2:36
12.	"Cardboard"		with muted trumpet	3:27
13.	"April in Paris"	Vernon Duke; Yip Harburg	solo piano	3:07
14.	"Chasin' the Bird"		trumpet and bass duet	2:56
15.	"Bongo Beep"			3:07
16.	"Star Eyes"	Gene de Paul; Don Raye		5:41
Total length:				64:26

== Personnel ==
Musicians

- Roy Hargrove – trumpet, flugelhorn
- Christian McBride – double bass
- Stephen Scott – piano

Technical

- Don Sickler, Richard Seidel – producer
- Camille Tominaro – production coordinator
- Beverly Harris – release coordinator
- Jim Anderson – recording engineer, liner notes
- Brian Kingman – assistant recording engineer
- Allan Tucker – mastering
- Bret Primack – liner notes
- David Lau – art direction
- Lisa Po-Ying Huang – art direction, design
- Jimmy Katz – photography (of trio)
- Herman Leonard – photography (of Charlie Parker)
