= Family (Roy Hargrove album) =

1995 studio album by Roy Hargrove

Studio album by Roy Hargrove
- Released: June 20, 1995
- Recorded: January 26–29, 1995
- Studios: Studio B, Clinton Recording Studios, NYC
- Genres: Jazz; straight-ahead jazz; hard bop
- Length: 78:19
- Labels: Verve; 314 527 630-2
- Producers: Roy Hargrove; Larry Clothier

Roy Hargrove chronology
With the Tenors of Our Time (1994)	Family (1995)	Parker's Mood (1995)

Family is a studio album by trumpeter Roy Hargrove, recorded on January 26–29, 1995, and released on June 20 of the same year, by Verve Records. It features Hargrove on trumpet in a quintet with saxophonist Ron Blake and three different rhythm sections (piano, bass, drums), plus guest artists: trumpeter Wynton Marsalis and saxophonists David "Fathead" Newman and Jesse Davis.

== Reception ==
Professional ratings
Review scores
Source	Rating
AllMusic	4/5 stars
Los Angeles Times	2.5/5 stars
The Penguin Guide to Jazz Recordings	3/4 stars
The Rolling Stone Album Guide	4/5 stars

Scott Yanow, writing for AllMusic, stated: "This well-rounded set not only features trumpeter Roy Hargrove with his mid-'90s quintet... but with two other rhythm sections and a few special guests. Hargrove shows off his warm tone on 'The Nearness of You'..., and other highlights include the lyrical 'Pas de Trois,'... Larry Willis' 'Ethiopia,' and a driving version of 'Firm Roots.' A meeting between Hargrove and Wynton Marsalis on the bop standard 'Nostalgia' is disappointingly tame, but otherwise this is a high-quality modern hard bop release."

The Rolling Stone Album Guide wrote: "Family similarly uses several stars with little focus... The album's saving graces are the fiercely bopping 'Firm Roots' and the almost eerily introspective Booker/Hargrove duet on 'Ethiopia.'"

Don Heckman of the Los Angeles Times wrote that "Hargrove now appears in yet another carefully planned production—one that embraces players from every stage of his brief but impressive career".

== Track listing ==
All tracks are written by Roy Hargrove except where noted.

No.	Title	Writer(s)	Length
0.	"Trilogy": 1. "Velera"; 2. "Roy Allan"; 3. "Brian's Bounce"		2:22; 3:48; 4:56
4.	"The Nearness of You"	Hoagy Carmichael; Ned Washington	7:03
5.	"Lament for Love"	Ronnie Mathews	4:01
6.	"Another Level"		6:23
7.	"A Dream of You"	Christian McBride	6:11
8.	"Pas de Trois"	Paul Arslanian	8:39
9.	"Polka Dots and Moonbeams"	Jimmy Van Heusen; Johnny Burke	5:36
10.	"The Challenge"		3:46
11.	"Ethiopia"	Larry Willis	3:36
12.	"Nostalgia"	Fats Navarro	6:00
13.	"Thirteenth Floor"	David "Fathead" Newman	5:57
14.	"Firm Roots"	Cedar Walton	5:57
15.	"The Trial"		3:38
Total length:			78:19

== Personnel ==
Musicians

- Roy Hargrove – trumpet (1–3, 5–8, 10, 12–15), flugelhorn (4, 9, 11)
- Wynton Marsalis – trumpet (12)
- David "Fathead" Newman – tenor saxophone (4), flute (13)
- Ron Blake – tenor saxophone (1–3, 6, 12, 14, 15), soprano saxophone (15)
- Jesse Davis – alto saxophone (9, 15)
- John Hicks (8), Larry Willis (9), Ronnie Mathews (5), Stephen Scott (1–4, 6, 7, 10, 12–15) – piano
- Christian McBride (7), Rodney Whitaker (1–4, 6, 10, 12–15), Walter Booker (5, 8, 9, 11) – double bass
- Gregory Hutchinson (1–3, 6, 7, 12, 15), Jimmy Cobb (4, 5, 8, 9, 13), Karriem Riggins (10), Lewis Nash (14) – drums

Technical

- Roy Hargrove, Larry Clothier – producer
- Richard Seidel – executive producer
- Camille Tominaro – production coordinator
- Beverly Harris – release coordinator
- Troy Halderson – recording engineer
- Adam Blackburn, Jonathan Mooney, Mark Agostino – assistant recording engineer
- Ed Rak – recording, editing, sequencing, mastering
- Hardgroove Ent. Inc. – management, booking
- David Lau – art direction
- Patricia Lie – art direction, design
- Michael Lavine – photography
- Jimmy Katz – photography (of personnel)
