= Roz Nixon =

American dramatist

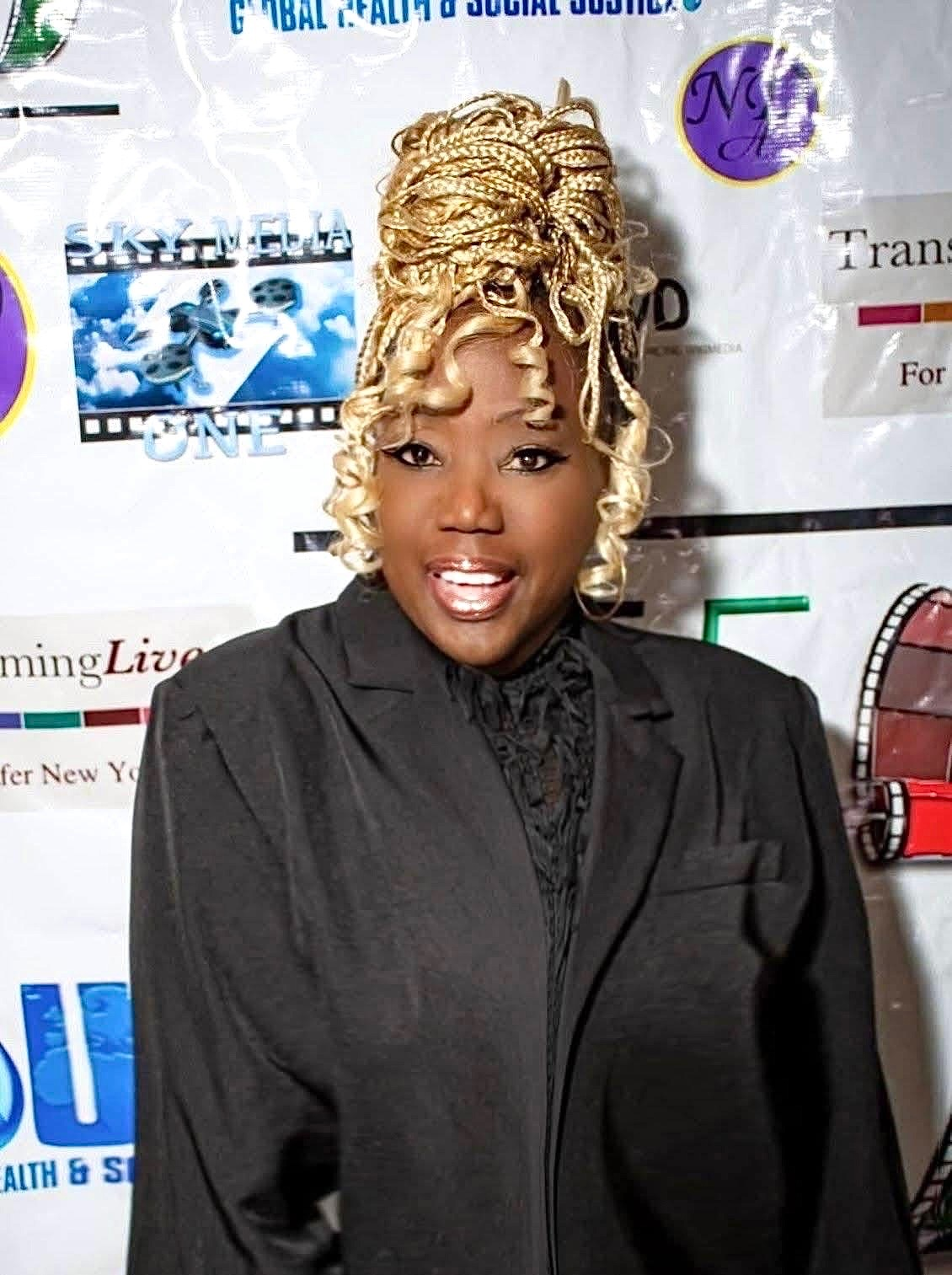
- Born: April 8, Queens, New York
- Occupation: Producer
- Parent(s): Ella and Robert Nixon
- Website: http://roznixonentertainment.webs.com/?no_redirect=trey

Roz Nixon is an American playwright, director and producer. She is the founder of Roz Nixon Entertainment and Great Women In Music which produces music festivals, concerts, and promotional events. Over the years Nixon has produced jazz performances that have featured award-winning artists such as Gloria Lynne, Roy Hargrove, Carmen Lundy, Christian McBride, Brianna Thomas and Frank Lacy.

A division of her organization books performers for television, commercials and film projects. Known as a "specials" casting agent (parts that may not be principal performers but are yet not background). Nixon has written four plays, primarily featuring song and verse regarding notable jazz musicians. Several of her concerts, shows and festivals have been produced in New York, Las Vegas, Miami and Istanbul.

In 2021 she created "Roz Live: Keeping Artists On Stage” at the Aloft Hotel and Mintons Play House in Harlem. These events provided artists with a salary during the COVID-19 pandemic.

== Career ==
Nixon is the executive producer and founder of Great Women in Music, a month-long festival featuring women in Jazz, Blues, Gospel and Soul music. The initial festival in 2001 featured Gloria Lynne, Alyson Williams and Shirley Caesar. Her festivals have gone on to present performers such as Phoebe Snow, Macy Gray, Carmen Lundy, Ann Hampton Callaway, Lainie Kazan and Melba Moore.

Roz Nixon Entertainment cast actors and music artists for film, television and commercials. Actors from Roz Nixon Entertainment can be found in such films as Unfaithful, The Devil Wears Prada, American Gangster, Music and Lyrics, and in episodes of Sex In the city, NYPD Blue and The Good Wife. Nixon was the casting agent for commercials by Heineken, Verizon and the New York Knicks.

As a playwright, Nixon has penned several plays including "Nothin' But The Blues", "Dedicated To Louis Armstrong" (the first theatrical performance ever in a major jazz festival), as well as the critically acclaimed "SS Nirvana: A Story of Love & Jazz on the High Seas", which was presented at Birdland in New York City. The fantasy jazz musical takes place in "Madame Royale's Supper Club" on a cruise ship and features portrayals of legendary jazz artists such as Louis Armstrong, Sarah Vaughan, and Billy Eckstine.

In 2005 Nixon produced for the JVC Jazz Festival "Dedicated To Louis Armstrong", a biographical musical story dedicated to the life of Louis Armstrong using narration, song, and dance. It was performed at the Blue Note.

In 2000 Nixon presented her work “To Louis Armstrong” at the Bell Atlantic Jazz Festival in New York City, Washington, D.C., and Philadelphia. In New York City, it was performed at the Knitting Factory and featured Roy Hargrove, John Hicks, Christian McBride, Wycliffe Gordon, and the legendary Bernard Purdie.

Nixon created a children's book about music titled Singin' Big Mae's Blues.

In 2008, after submitting an entertainment story to a local New York newspaper, Nixon began to write a weekly article for Caribbean Life News covering New York City night life.

== Plays ==
- Nothin’ But the Blues (Ghanniyya Green (1997))
- Sisters That Get Everything 1998 (Me'Lisa Morgan)
- Dedicated to Louis Armstrong, Roy Hargrove, Christian McBride, a theatrical musical (2000)
- SS Nirvana: A Story of Love & Jazz on the High Seas (Ghanniyya Green)
