= Reggie Washington =

American jazz bassist (born 1962)

Reginald Reuben Washington (born July 28, 1962 in New York City) is an American jazz bassist. He is the brother of drummer Kenny Washington.

Reggie and his brother Kenny played percussion instruments as The Washington Brothers from age seven. Soon after, Reggie took up cello and then both electric and double-bass. He began playing professionally as a bassist in the early 1980s, with Chico Hamilton for much of that decade, as well as with Ronald Shannon Jackson, Carlos Ward, Jean-Paul Bourelly, and Clyde Criner.

In the 1990s, Washington worked with Steve Coleman, Gene Lake, Branford Marsalis (in Buckshot LeFonque), Marvin "Smitty" Smith, Andy Milne, Don Byron, David Gilmore, Oliver Lake, Marc Ledford, Joseph Bowie, Cassandra Wilson, Ronnie Cuber, Greg Osby, and Uri Caine. He has also recorded as a leader on various projects such as Reuben's Bass Choir, a group consisting of several basses and a drummer. In the 2000s he continued performing with Bourelly and Oliver Lake, as well as with Me'Shell Ndegeocello, among others. Washington can be heard as a sideman on over a hundred recordings, including the releases Hard Groove and Distractions (The RH Factor album) from Roy Hargrove's project The RH Factor.
