= Keith Anderson (saxophonist) =

American saxophonist (born 1970)

- Born: 1970 (age 54–55); Dallas, Texas, United States
- Genres: Jazz, rock, R&B, pop
- Occupation: Musician
- Instrument: Saxophone

Keith Anderson (born 1970) is an American saxophonist. After studying at Booker T. Washington Arts Magnet, Anderson has played with Les McCann, Roy Hargrove, Erykah Badu, Kirk Franklin, Kanye West, Marcus Miller, and Prince.

In 2003, the Keith Anderson Trio comprised Jason Thomas on drums and Bobby Sparks on keyboards.

The New York Times and Jazz Times writer Nate Chinen quotes Anderson as stating: "Texas musicians have a different approach to playing. It's not from a mechanical standpoint... The way we play is not based upon what we see on paper. It's based on all feeling and listening."

== Discography ==
=== As sideman ===
- 1995: Listen Up! - Les McCann
- 2006: Distractions – The RH Factor (Verve)
- 2017: Extravagant - Aleks Sever
