= Jadwiga Tyszka =

Polish actress and community activist

Jadwiga Tyszka (Yagoda Tyszka-Krayewski) (November 25, 1954 – February 26, 2005) was an actress in theater, TV and film in Poland and a community activist in Newark, New Jersey. She was married to the painter, Andre de Krayewski. The couple had two children.
