= Kazimierz Tyszka =

Polish politician (1872–1951)

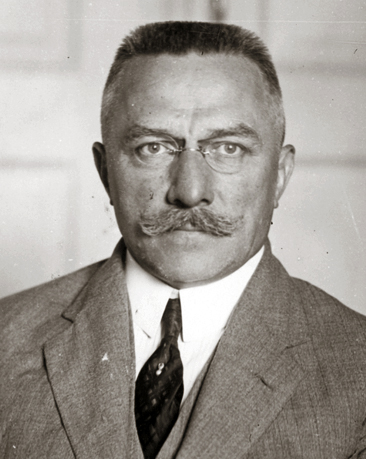

Kazimierz Tyszka (Kalisz, Poland, 1872 – 1951, London, UK) was Polish Minister of Railways, 1923–25, in Władysław Grabski's government.
