= Chalmers Alford =

American guitarist (1955–2008)

Chalmers "Spanky" Alford
- Born: Chalmers Edward Alford; May 22, 1955; Philadelphia, Pennsylvania, U.S.
- Died: March 24, 2008 (aged 52) Huntsville, Alabama
- Genres: Blues, gospel, neo-soul
- Occupation: Musician
- Instrument: Guitar
- Years active: 1960s–2008
- Formerly of: The Soultronics, Mighty Clouds of Joy

Chalmers Edward "Spanky" Alford (May 22, 1955 – March 24, 2008) was an American gospel, jazz, and neo-soul guitarist. Alford was born in Philadelphia. He was well known for his playing style, utilizing chord embellishments. He had an illustrious career as a gospel quartet guitar player in the 1960s, 1970s, and 1980s with groups such as the Mighty Clouds of Joy. His most notable contributions are to the D'Angelo album Voodoo, and his contributions to music from other popular artists including Tupac Shakur, Roy Hargrove, and The Roots.

== Career ==
Alford's career spans across multiple musical scenes. Beginning in Philadelphia, Pennsylvania, he relocated multiple times to areas such as Dallas, Texas, and finally, Huntsville, Alabama.

His career as a recorded guitarist began in 1977 with the group The East St. Louis Gospelletts. Within the same year he would find himself playing with the influential gospel group the Mighty Clouds of Joy in Philadelphia. These early gospel records would prove to be important in establishing his body of work as an influential gospel quartet guitarist. It was on the Might Clouds of Joy album Pray For Me that Alford also became a recorded vocalist.

Later in life, he found a new career in the neo-soul movement of the 1990s and 2000s, most notably contributing to the sounds of D'Angelo and Tony Toni Toné. Alford played guitar as part of The Soultronics (D'Angelo's band for his 2000 "Voodoo" tour), alongside Questlove, James Poyser, Pino Palladino, and Anthony Hamilton. He was a teacher, and was credited with teaching Raphael Saadiq, Isaiah Sharkey, and others to play guitar. He played on several albums with artists such as Joss Stone, John Mayer, Mary J. Blige, Raphael Saadiq, D'Angelo and Roy Hargrove.

Alford provided guitars on the 2003 Roy Hargrove album Hard Groove. He was accompanied by what Hargrove called the "Texas Cats"--Bernard Wright, the Keith Anderson Trio, Jason Thomas, Bobby Sparks and Cornell Dupree--whose combined collaborations proved highly influential in the final production of this landmark jazz record. This record was recorded at the Electric Ladyland Studios using much of the same personnel as D'Angelo's Voodoo album.

Around this time was also Alford was put into contact with J Dilla, who sought to use Alford's ability to reproduce guitar parts note-for-note to bypass sampling laws.

The final era of Alford's career was spent in Huntsville, Alabama, where he performed locally and taught a generation of area musicians from the locally known guitar store, T-Shepard's Guitars. In 2000 Alford would provide his services as a guitarist and producer on the Blind Boys of Alabama's release "My Lord What A Morning!", and later in 2003, "There's Nothing In This World Without A Heart," where he would return to his traditional gospel roots. Alford began playing bass professionally at local churches around this period of time as well. Much of the mentorship he would offer came from his positions working at local churches, where he would foster young musicians interest in music and provide resources to help them grow.

Though he retired from touring years prior, Alford made a rare public appearance performing with the John Mayer Trio as a surprise guest on September 26, 2005, during their stop in Nashville, Tennessee. It is his last known public performance. Audio from the show eventually ended up on the Trio's only official release, a compilation of performances from the tour called Try!, appearing on the title track at the end of the album.

Alford died in March 2008, at the age of 52, in Huntsville, Alabama due to complications from diabetes. His funeral was held at Saint Luke Missionary Baptist Church in Huntsville.

D'Angelo's 2014 release Black Messiah includes some posthumously released recordings of Alford's playing. These recordings were likely created during Alford's time in New York recording at Electric Ladyland Studios.

== Playing style ==
Alford's playing style was an eclectic mix of gospel and jazz influences. Cited as some of Alford's influences are Wes Montgomery, Joe Pass, Charlie Christian, Chet Atkins and George Benson, among many others. His playing utilized a mix of jazz inspired chord embellishments, chord extensions, gospel style passing chords. Compositionally, Alford was inspired by artists such as Stevie Wonder. He also cited the piano as a source of inspiration for his intricate moving inner-voice chord melodies.

Alford's playing on the Tupac Shakur track "Words 2 My Firstborn" demonstrates his ability to write instrumental hooks that meld both hip-hop and gospel guitar styles. During the verses, he punctuates Shakur's rapping with colorful double stops that outline the harmony of the otherwise sparse track.

While playing with D'Angelo, Alford playing distinctively shifts stylistically, as his interjections took on a more ornamental role that melded with the other instruments on the track. On the track "Africa" from the album Voodoo, Alford's Hendrix-inspired playing is demonstrated through the various use of reverse taped guitar sounds. The record was recorded at the Electric Ladyland Recording Studio in New York City, which had been created by and for Jimi Hendrix. The track "Untitled (How Does It Feel)" also demonstrates Alford's deep understanding of pocket throughout the intense six-eight R&B ballad. This track eventually won a Grammy Award, which brought Alford's playing to even more audiences.

On The Roots track "What They Do", Alford brings a more smooth sound to the production. His signature direct, and warm sound produced from his signature black Gibson ES-335, being played through a Fender Twin Reverb shows another aesthetic side of Alford not seen on his earlier recordings. His playing on this track demonstrates his influence from jazz guitarist George Benson, and his solo is a great example of his ability to create chord melody hooks that help drive the track forward.

== Discography ==
- The East St. Louis Gospellettes, Love Is The Key (1977)
- Mighty Clouds of Joy, Live And Direct (1977)
- Randolph Watson And The Voices Of Faith, Rodena Preston Presents Look Where God Has Brought Us (1977)
- The Topics, Wanted Live! By A Million Girls (1978)
- The Mighty Clouds Of Joy, Miracle Man (1982)
- The Mighty Clouds of Joy, Pray for Me (1990)
- The Evereadys, A Message For You (1991)
- Tony Toni Toné, House Of Music (1996)
- Kissin' You, Total (1996)
- The Roots, Illadelph Halflife (1996)
- With My Eyes Closed, Bee Gees (1997)
- Bone Family Choir, O Lord I Want You To Move (1997)
- Always, Willie Max (1998)
- A Tribe Called Quest, The Love Movement (1998)
- Lamentation, Eric Benét (1999)
- Angie Stone, Black Diamond (1999)
- Hurry Up This Way Again, Terri Gore (1999)
- The Roots, Things Fall Apart (1999)
- Unconditional Love, Tarralyn Ramsey (2000)
- D'Angelo, Voodoo (2000)
- Clarence Fountain & The Blind Boys Of Alabama, My Lord What A Morning! (2000)
- 2Pac, Until the End of Time (2001)
- Raphael Saadiq, Instant Vintage (2002)
- There's Nothing In This World Without A Heart, The Blind Boys Of Alabama (2003)
- Roy Hargrove, Hard Groove (2003)
- Roy Hargrove, Strength (2004)
- Norman Brown, West Coast Coolin' (2004)
- The Canton Spirituals, New Life: Live in Harvey, IL (2004)
- Pretty Baby, Eric Benét (2005)
- Vick Allen, Simply Soul (2005)
- Evelyn Turrentine-Agee, Call Jesus (2005)
- Evelyn Turrentine-Agee, Go Through (2005)
- Rhian Benson, Gold Coast (2005)
- Mary J. Blige, The Breakthrough (2005)
- Vikter Duplaix, Bold and Beautiful (2006)
- John Mayer, Continuum (2006)
- Jackie Gore, Soulful Provider (2007)
- Stan Jones, Out of the Shadows (2007)
- Joss Stone, Introducing Joss Stone (2007)
- Ali Shaheed Muhammad, Shaheedullah and Stereotypes (2007)
- Al Green, Lay It Down (2008)
- D'Angelo, Black Messiah (2014)
