= Habana (album) =

1997 studio album by Roy Hargrove's Crisol

Studio album by Roy Hargrove's Crisol
- Released: 1997
- Recorded: January 5 & 6, 1997
- Studios: Teatro Mancinelli, Orvieto, Italy; Blackburn Audio Engineering, N.Y.
- Genres: Jazz; Latin jazz; Afro-Cuban Jazz; post-bop
- Length: 70:26
- Labels: Verve; 314 537 563-2
- Producers: Roy Hargrove; Larry Clothier

Roy Hargrove chronology
Parker's Mood (1995)	Habana (1997)	Moment to Moment (2000)

Habana is an album by Roy Hargrove's Crisol band, recorded on January 5 & 6, 1997, and released the same year by Verve Records.

Crisol is a collective including Cuban pianist Chucho Valdés, conguero Miguel "Angá" Díaz, drummer Horacio "El Negro" Hernandez, and timbalero Jose Luis "Changuito" Quintana, with American musicians Hargrove on trumpet, guitarist Russell Malone, saxophonists Gary Bartz and David Sánchez, trombonist Frank Lacy, and bassist John Benitez.

In 1998, the album won Hargrove and the band the Grammy Award for Best Latin Jazz Performance.

== Reception ==
Professional ratings
Review scores
Source	Rating
All About Jazz	4.5/5 stars
AllMusic	4/5 stars
The Penguin Guide to Jazz Recordings	3/4 stars
The Rolling Stone Album Guide	4/5 stars

Jim Santell, writing for All About Jazz, commented: "Roy Hargrove's change in direction toward irresistible dance music in the Afro-Cuban tradition has fans all over wondering, 'Is this for real?' [...] It's a stylistic change-up for trumpeter Roy Hargrove, but successful, and proof that the trumpeter is capable of following his instincts."

Richard S. Ginell of AllMusic wrote: "At last, this highly touted, heretofore conservative Young Lion makes his move beyond neo-bop toward something new, fresh, and potentially important. [...] one can still hear the embryo of its [Crisol's] complex fusion of Afro-Cuban rhythm, bop, and progressive jazz impulses on this disc. Hargrove himself still seems dazzled by his new discovery, groping a bit for direction in his own solos. But challenged by the asymmetrical rhythms, he takes more chances and jaggedly strikes some fire."

DownBeat magazine concluded that "Hargrove, through Habana..., seamlessly infused his signature sound and persona into Latin jazz, the same way he did with every other kind of music from straight-ahead jazz to hip-hop."

The Penguin Guide to Jazz Recordings was more critical of the album, stating: "Jostling with rhythms, plangent in its solos, this is a fun, lightweight record which isn't so much a departure for the trumpeter as a sunny vacation. There's little to suggest any profound commitment to the local style or indeed anything beyond a good-natured piece of opportunism, and some of the elements (particularly Lacy's awry trombone parts) just sound wrong; but it remains an enjoyable piece of hokum, whatever the subtext."

The Rolling Stone Album Guide noted that "Habana takes Hargrove 180 degrees from anything he has done previously. The album matches an all-star Afro-Cuban rhythm section... against an impressive horn section".

In a 1997 review, The Washington Post's Geoffrey Himes called the album "Hargrove's most impressive album yet".

== Track listing ==
All tracks are written and arranged by Roy Hargrove except where noted.

No.	Title	Writer(s)	Arranger(s)	Length
1.	"O My Seh Yeh"	Frank Lacy	Lacy	9:59
2.	"Una Mas"	Kenny Dorham	Hargrove	8:06
3.	"Dream Traveler"			5:23
4.	"Nusia's Poem"	Gary Bartz	Hargrove	6:20
5.	"Mr. Bruce"	Chucho Valdés	Valdés	5:30
6.	"Ballad for the Children"			4:52
7.	"The Mountaings"			8:07
8.	"Afrodisia"	Dorham	Don Sickler	4:46
9.	"Mambo for Roy"	Valdés	Valdés	11:01
10.	"O My Seh Yeh (Reprise)"	Lacy	Lacy	6:22
Total length:				70:26

== Personnel ==
Musicians

- Roy Hargrove – trumpet, flugelhorn
- Gary Bartz – alto and soprano saxophones
- David Sánchez – tenor and soprano saxophones
- Frank Lacy – trombone
- Chucho Valdés, John Hicks (4) – piano
- Russell Malone – guitar
- Jorge Reyes – electric bass (5)
- John Benitez – bass (1–4, 6–10)
- Horacio "El Negro" Hernandez, Idris Muhammad (4) – drums
- Miguel "Angá" Díaz – congas
- Jose Luis "Changuito" Quintana – timbales

Technical

- Roy Hargrove – producer
- Larry Clothier – producer, mixing
- Richard Seidel – executive producer
- Carlo Pagnotta – associate producer
- Camille Tominaro – production coordinator
- Adam Blackburn – recording engineer
- Marsh Clothier – assistant recording engineer
- Giampiero Berti, Gianni Grassilli – music recording consultant
- Ed Rak – editing, mastering, mixing, sequencing
- Adam Blackburn – mixing
- Patricia Lie – art direction, design
- Merri Cyr – photography (Havana, Cuba; front cover)
- Mario Lunetti, Neri Oddo – photography (Orvieto, Italy)
