= Superblue (band) =

American jazz ensemble

Superblue was an American jazz ensemble that released two albums for Blue Note Records in 1988 and 1989. It was led by trumpeter Don Sickler. The ensemble played in the hard bop style of Blue Note acts of the 1950s and 1960s.

The Los Angeles Times wrote of the ensemble's debut, "[Bobby] Watson's ripe-toned alto on 'Summertime' and [Bill] Pierce's romping tenor on 'Sesame' are just two highlights of this excellent effort that reaffirms the lasting value of mainstream jazz." The Globe and Mail determined that the second album avoids the "out-and-out revivalism with little-big-band charts that remove the tunes to some distance from their funky origins".

== Superblue ==
Superblue (1988) featured an octet including Bobby Watson, Roy Hargrove, Mulgrew Miller, Frank Lacy, Bill Pierce, Kenny Washington, Don Sickler, and Bob Hurst.

Track listing:

1. "Open Sesame"
2. "I Remember Clifford"
3. "M. and M."
4. "Marvelous Marvin"
5. "Once Forgotten"
6. "Conservation"
7. "Summertime"
8. "Time Off"

== Superblue 2 ==
Superblue 2 (1989) featured Sickler, Watson, Hurst, Wallace Roney, Robin Eubanks, Ralph Moore, Renee Rosnes, and Marvin "Smitty" Smith.

Track listing:

1. "Flight to Jordan"
2. "Nica's Dream"
3. "'Round Midnight"
4. "Take Your Pick"
5. "Blue Minor"
6. "Autumn Leaves"
7. "Blue Bossa"
8. "Desert Moonlight"
9. "Low Tide"
10. "Cool Struttin'"
