= Sherman Irby =

American jazz saxophonist (born 1968)

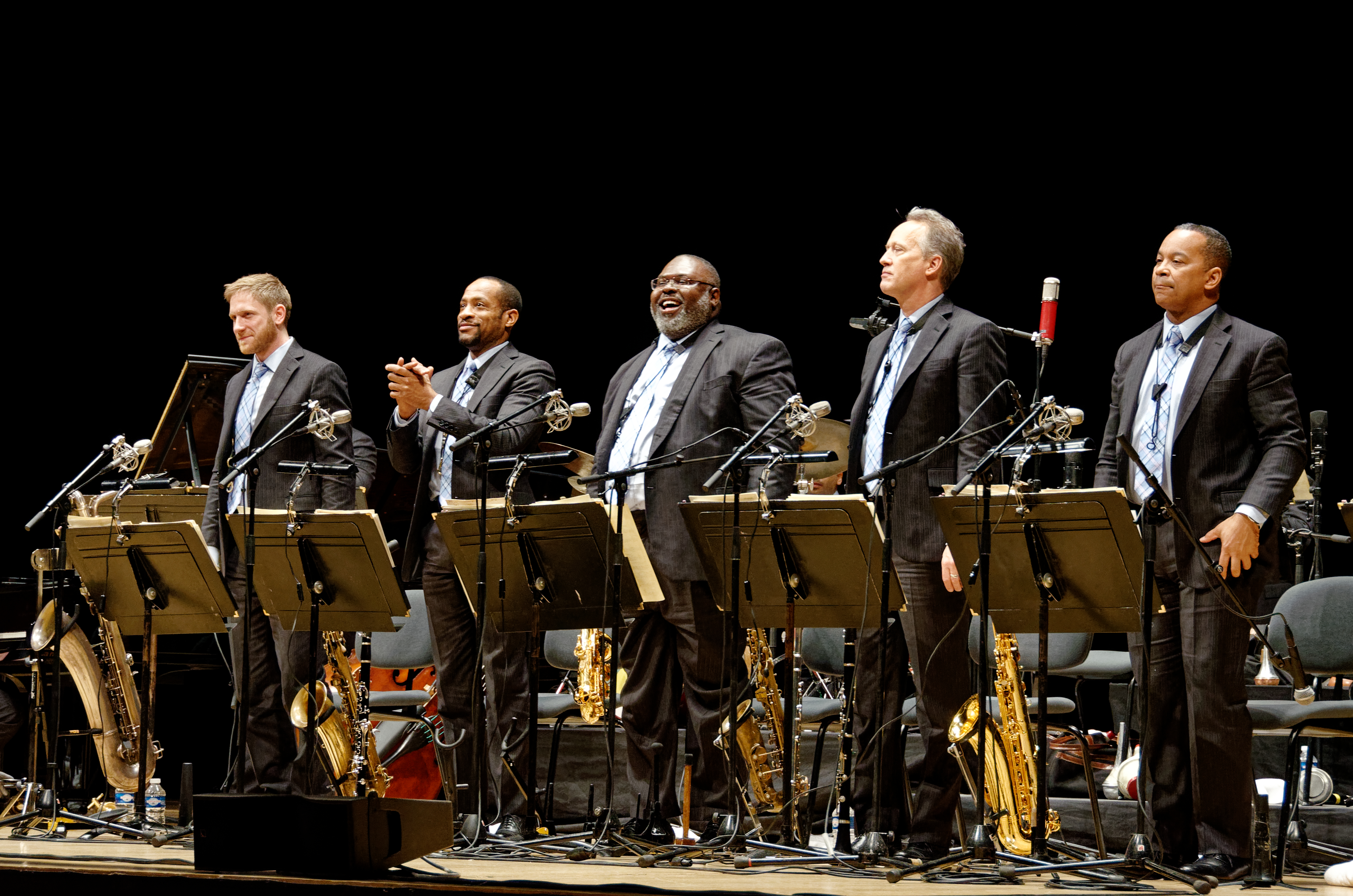
- Irby with the Jazz at Lincoln Center Orchestra in Lyon, 2016

Background information
- Born: March 24, 1968 (age 58); Tuscaloosa, Alabama, U.S.
- Genres: Jazz; post-bop
- Occupation: Musician
- Instruments: Alto saxophone; clarinet; flute
- Years active: 1991–present
- Labels: Blue Note; Black Warrior
- Member of: Jazz at Lincoln Center Orchestra
- Website: www.shermanirby.com

Sherman Irby (born March 24, 1968) is an American jazz alto saxophonist and composer.

== Early life and education ==
Irby was born and raised in Tuscaloosa, Alabama, and found his calling to music at the age of 12. In high school, he played and recorded with gospel legend James Cleveland. He graduated from Clark Atlanta University with a B. A. in Music Education, where he pledged the Alpha Phi Chapter of Alpha Phi Alpha fraternity in 1988.

== Career ==
In 1991, he joined Johnny O'Neal's Atlanta-based quintet. In 1994, he moved to New York City. Later he recorded his first two albums, Full Circle (1996) and Big Mama's Biscuits (1998), for Blue Note Records.

Irby toured the U.S. and the Caribbean with the Boys Choir of Harlem in 1995. During that tenure, he also recorded and toured with Marcus Roberts and was part of Betty Carter's Jazz Ahead Program together with Roy Hargrove. After a four-year stint with Hargrove, Irby focused on his own group, in addition to being a member of Elvin Jones' ensemble and Papo Vázquez's Pirates Troubadours.

From 2003 to 2011, Irby was a regional director for JazzMasters Workshop, a mentoring program for young children. He has served as Artist-in-Residence for Jazz Camp West, and as an instructor for the Monterey Jazz Festival Band Camp. He was also a board member for several years for the CubaNOLA Collective. Irby formed Black Warrior Records and released Black Warrior, Faith, Organ Starter, and Live at the Otto Club under the new label.

Irby is a member and the lead alto saxophonist of the Jazz at Lincoln Center Orchestra with Wynton Marsalis. He first played in the orchestra from 1995 to 1997 and rejoined in 2005. Since rejoining, Irby, along with most members of the orchestra, has arranged much of the vast library of music that they have performed. He has also been commissioned to compose new works, including "Twilight Sounds", inspired by Norman Lewis' painting of the same name, his ballet Inferno, an interpretation of Dante's Divine Comedy, and the science-fiction themed Musings of Cosmic Stuff.

== Discography ==
=== As leader ===
- Full Circle (Blue Note, 1997)
- Big Mama's Biscuits (Blue Note, 1998)
- Black Warrior (Black Warrior, 2001)
- Faith (Black Warrior, 2005)
- Organ Starter (Black Warrior, 2006)
- Work Song: Dear Cannonball (Birds Records, 2009)
- Live At The Otto Club (Black Warrior, 2010)
- Cerulean Canvas (Black Warrior, 2017)

=== As co-leader ===
- A Jazz Christmas Celebration For Banfi with Steve Turre, Akua Dixon, Nico Menci, Marco Marzola, Darrell Green, Dion Parson (Wide Music, 2009)

=== As sideman ===
- Roy Hargrove, Moment to Moment (Verve, 2000)
- Roy Hargrove, Bern (Time Traveler, 2026)
