= Panasonic Village Jazz Festival =

Event in New York

The Panasonic Village Jazz Festival is/was a summer annual music festival held at Washington Square Park in Greenwich Village in New York City. It began in 1994 and continued until at least 1999.
