= Gerald L. Cannon =

American jazz bassist (born 1958)

Gerald Cannon
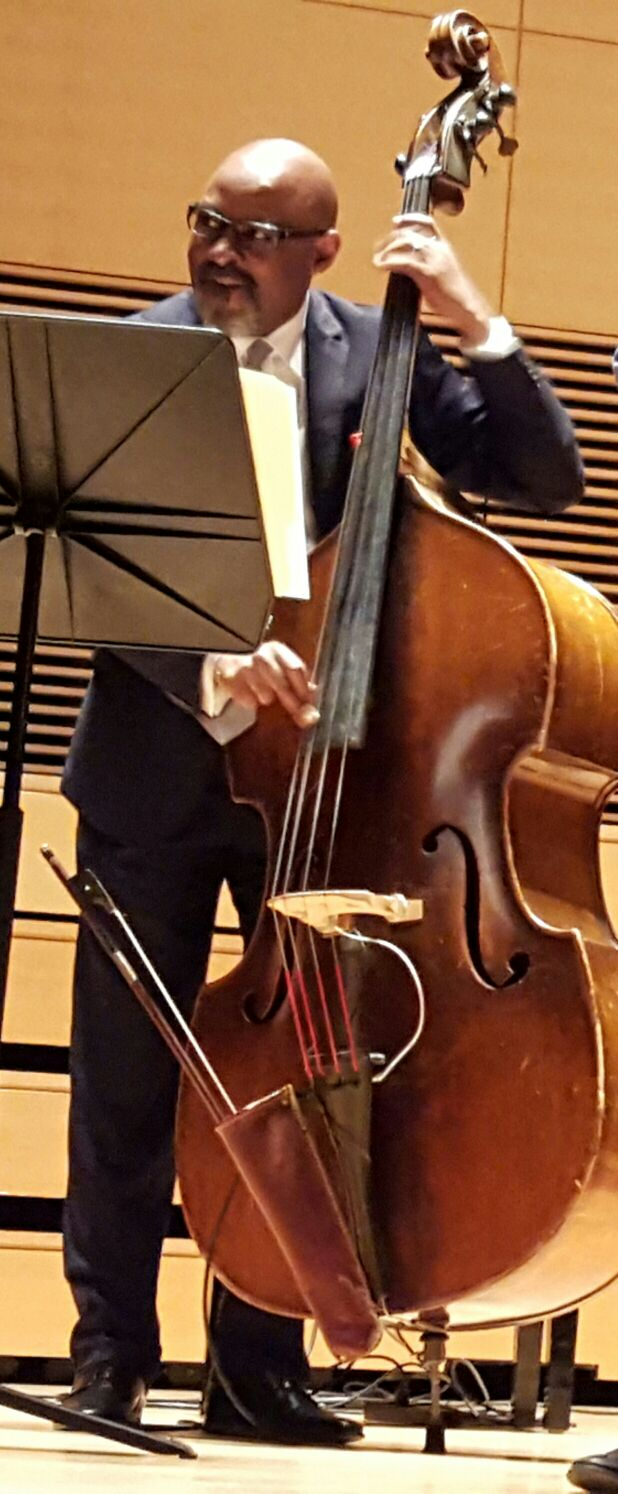

Background information
- Born: Gerald Leon Cannon; March 15, 1958 (age 68); Racine, Wisconsin, U.S.
- Genres: Jazz
- Occupation: Musician
- Instrument: Double bass
- Label: Woodneck
- Website: www.cannonmusicnart.com

Gerald Leon Cannon (born 1958) is an American jazz double bassist and visual artist.

== Early life ==
Born in Racine, Wisconsin, he attended The University of Wisconsin at La Crosse where he met jazz player Milt Hinton. Cannon also studied at the Wisconsin Conservatory of Music in Milwaukee.

== Biography ==
Cannon moved to New York City at age 28, and he started to play at the Blue Note Jazz Club with musicians Winard and Philip Harper and Justin Robinson. From there, he moved to gigs with Art Blakey's Jazz Messengers, Dexter Gordon, Cedar Walton Trio with Billy Higgins, Jimmy Smith, Jimmy Scott, James Williams, Hamiett Bluiett, Ed Thigpen, Frank Foster, John Bunch, Eddie Harris, Stanley Turrentine and Bunky Green. When trumpeter Roy Hargrove came to a club where Cannon was working, they met. For the next seven years, Cannon performed as a member of Hargrove's band at major jazz festivals all over the world, including the North Sea Jazz Festival, Cape Town Jazz Festival, Montreux Jazz Festival, Umbria Jazz Festival in Perugia, and the Montreal Jazz Festival. He also was a part of the award-winning Crisol tour where Cannon played with Cuban musicians like percussionist Jose Luis "Chanquito" Quintana, Miguel "Anga" Diaz, Horacio "El Negro" Hernandez, and Chucho Valdes and studied with bassist Orlando "Cachahito" Lopez and pianist Ruben Gonzalez.

== Style ==
Cannon carries the knowledge passed on to him by bassists Ray Brown, Sam Jones, Ron Carter, and Buster Williams and continues the legacy by conducting master classes throughout the U.S. and Europe. He taught at the Oberlin Conservatory in 2014, the Wisconsin Conservatory of Music in Milwaukee, and the New School in New York and at Long Island University. He also gave a number of master classes at the University of Wisconsin in Whitewater and Eau Claire, at Emory University in Atlanta, Georgia and at the Conservatory of Amsterdam. Cannon was also a faculty member of the Conservatory of Maastricht, Holland. Cannon is currently Jazz Bass Instructor at JUILLIARD School (New York), Associate Professor of Jazz Bass at OBERLIN College & Conservatory (Ohio), and on the Board of the Directors at the Wisconsin Conservatory of Music.

After leaving Hargrove, Cannon held the bass chair for drummer Elvin Jones until his passing in 2004. Since then, Cannon has worked with Wynton and Branford Marsalis, Pat Martino, Louis Hayes, The Cannonball Legacy, Ernestine Anderson, Carmen Lundy, Abbey Lincoln, Gary Bartz, Joe Lovano, Monty Alexander, Larry Willis, Eddie Henderson, Steve Turre, Eric Reed, the Dexter Gordon Legacy Ensemble, and many other combinations, as well as with his own quartet. He continues to conduct Master classes around the world and remains the musical director for the McCoy Tyner Trio.

== Discography ==
=== As leader ===
- 2003: Gerald Cannon (Woodneck Records)
- 2017: Combinations (Woodneck Records)
- 2023: Live at Dizzy's Club: The Music of Elvin & McCoy (Woodneck Records)

=== As sideman ===
- 1965: I'm going on The Gospel Expressions
- 1995: Quick Pick Shingo Okudaira (King)
- 1995: Kilifi Shingo Okudaira (King)
- 1995: Fire Tim Armacost (Concord)
- 1996: Maconde Shingo Okudaira (King)
- 1998: Live at Smalls Tim Armacost (Double Time Records)
- 1998: Big Mama's Biscuits Sherman Irby (Blue Note)
- 1998: Invitation Anthony Wonsey
- 1998: Big Bertha Anthony Wonsey
- 1999: Straight Swinging vol.1 Willie Jones III (WJ3 Records)
- 1999: Moment to Moment Roy Hargrove (Verve)
- 1999: Triangular 2 Cannon/Ralph Peterson, Jr./David Kikoski (Sirocco)
- 2001: Don't Knock the Swing Vol. 2 Willie Jones III (WJ3 Records)
- 2002: Profile Jeremy Pelt (Fresh Sounds)
- 2004: Intuition Wayne Escoffery (Nagel Heyer Records)
- 2004: Faith Sherman Irby (Black Warrior)
- 2005: You Tell Me Rick Germanson
- 2005: Slim Goodie Derrick Gardner and the Prophets
- 2006: Keep Searchin' Steve Turre (HighNote)
- 2006: Black Warrior Sherman Irby (Black Warrior)
- 2008: What's Your Story Roberta Donnay
- 2009: Off the Cuff Rick Germanson
- 2009: Echoes of Ethnicity Derrick Gardner and the Prophets
- 2009: Open the Gates Anthony Wonsey (Criss Cross Jazz)
- 2011: Compare to What Derrick Gardner and the Prophets
- 2013: On the Waves Dmitry Mospan
- 2015: Love Looks Good on You Russell Malone
- 2015: Spiritman Steve Turre
- 2016: Routes The Stryker/Slagle band expanded
- 2016: Alto Manhattan Steve Slagle (Panorama Records)
- 2016: FE Francisco Mela and the Crash Trio
- 2017: Cerulean Canvas Sherman Irby & Momentum
- 2017: All These Hands Michael Dease Posi-Tone Records
- 2018: Duane Eubanks Quintet: Live at Smalls Duane Eubanks SmallsLIVE
- 2019: Three Score Ralph Moore WJ3 Records
- 2019: Turquoise Twice Rick Germanson WJ3 Records
- 2020: Shuffle and Deal Eddie Henderson, Donald Harrison, Kenny Barron, Gerald Cannon, Mike Clark (SMOKE SESSIONS Records)
- 2021: Fallen HeroesWillie Jones III, Willie Jones, Jeremy Pelt, Sherman Irby, George Cables, Gerald Cannon, Steve Davis, Justin Robinson, Isaiah Thompson, Renee Neufville, WJ3 Records
- 2022: The Ways in James Zollar JZAZ Records
- 2022: New Beginnings Jason Marshall Cellar Music Group Records
- 2023: Resolution Ken Fowser WJ3 Records
