= Jacques Schwarz-Bart =

French jazz saxophonist (born 1962)

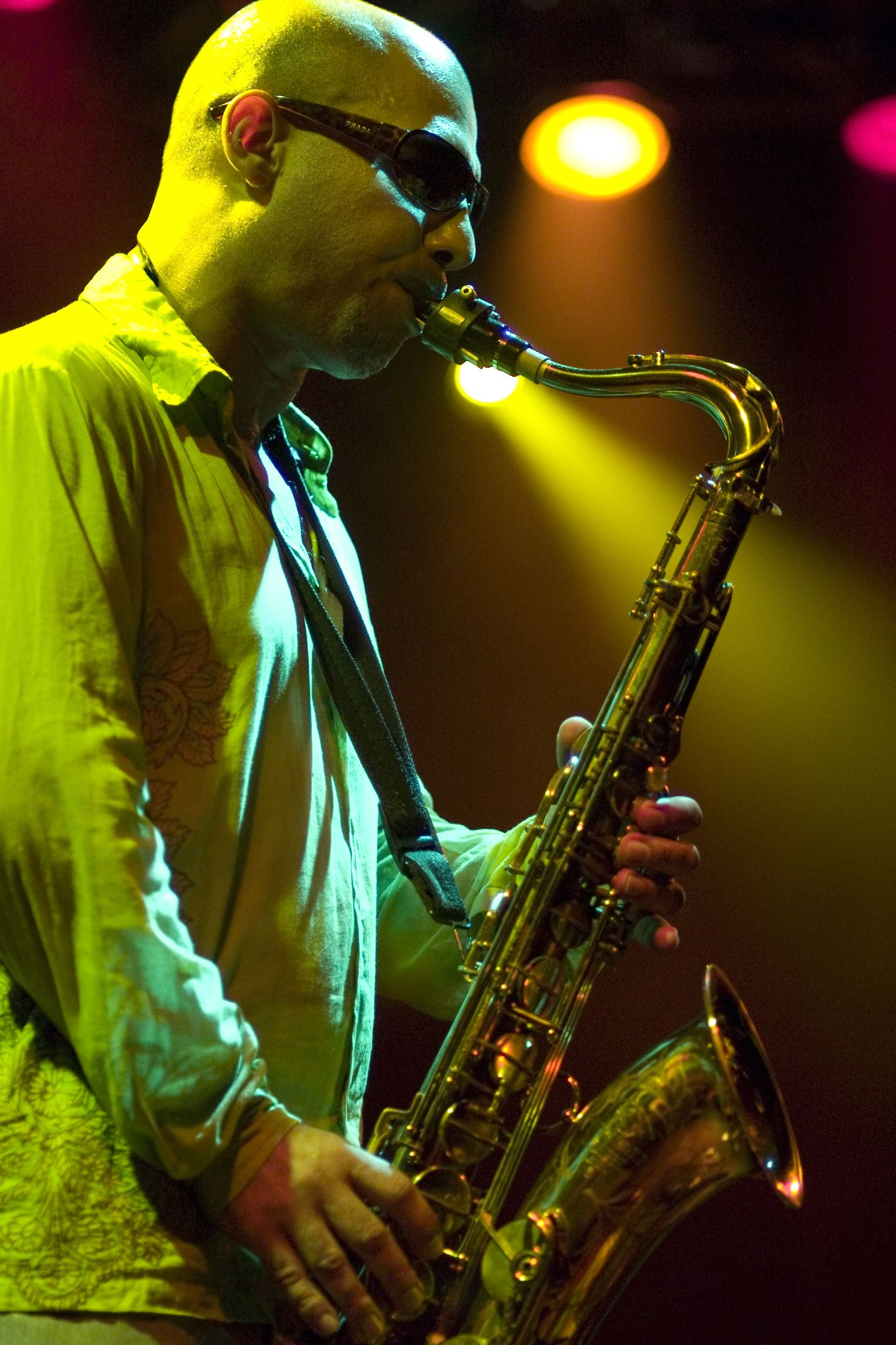

Jacques Schwarz-Bart (born 22 December 1962 in Les Abymes) is a French jazz saxophonist.

== Biography ==
His mother is the Guadeloupean novelist Simone Schwarz-Bart, author of The Bridge of Beyond. His father was French-Jewish author André Schwarz-Bart. The family traveled widely, living in Senegal, Switzerland, and Goyave, Guadeloupe. Jacques Schwarz-Bart was dubbed "Brother Jacques" and his music has incorporated rhythm and blues as well as hip hop influences.

Schwarz-Bart's first instrument was the Gwo ka drum which he learned to play as a child, coached by Anzala (one of the top percussionists in Guadeloupe). He also learned the biguine style of music. At age six, while living in Switzerland, he discovered jazz music and taught himself guitar by playing along with jazz records.

Schwarz-Bart graduated from the School of Government called Sciences Po, and worked as a Senator’s assistant in Paris. When he was 24, he began playing saxophone, and after three years, he left his position in government, and attended the Berklee School of Music, in Boston, Massachusetts.

In addition to his work with Roy Hargrove and D'Angelo, Schwarz-Bart did session work, and performed live with, Erykah Badu, Eric Benet, Meshell N’degeocello, James Hurt, Danilo Perez, Ari Hoenig and David Gilmore. His tune, "Forget Regret", was a single on Hargrove’s 2003 album "Hard Groove."

In 2005, Schwarz-Bart left Hargrove's band and began the Gwoka Jazz Project which included musicians such as Admiral T and Jacob Desvarieux of Kassav', and resulted in two albums with Universal, Soné Ka La and Abyss. In 2010, he released Rise Above which is a collaboration with singer Stephanie McKay, who is also his wife.

In 2014, Schwarz-Bart released an album called Jazz Racine Haïti. With a deep knowledge of Haitian heritage, he was inspired to integrate voodoo ritual music into his repertoire, by the arrangement of sacred tunes and composed melodies by bringing about the fusion and synergy of modern jazz with musique rasin. Like the blues, musique racine was source of inspiration that enabled millions of slaves to overcome tragedy and escape oppressive conditioning. Schwarz-Bart recognizing that this rebellious sound is universal and has shaped “Black Music”, he attempts to give meaning to this original heritage. He toured in Lyon, from 13–18 January 2014, and continued his exploration of this sound in Paris at the New Morning on 7 March 2014 and planned on touring in Hamburg and Brussels the following Spring. The publication of this album was supported by UNESCO within the framework of the program "The Slave Route", about Afro-Caribbean historical folklore in which the power of emotion which give meaning to their human condition, resist the erosion of time.

In 2018, French independent record label alter-nativ released the record SHIJIN with Jacques Schwarz-Bart, pianist Malcolm Braff from Switzerland, bassist Laurent David from France and drummer Stephane Galland from Belgium.

== Discography ==
=== As leader ===
- Immersion (Fresh Sound, 1999)
- Sone Ka-La (EmArcy, 2006)
- Abyss (Universal, 2008)
- Rise Above (Dreyfus, 2010)
- The Art of Dreaming (Aztec Music, 2012)
- Jazz Racine Haiti (Motema, 2014)
- Hazzan (Enja, 2018)
