= Roy Hargrove discography =

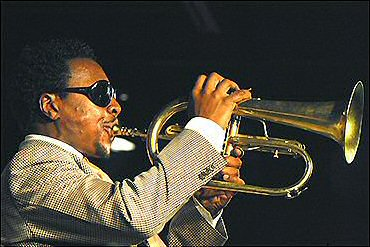
- Hargrove on flugelhorn, 2007
- Studio albums: 16
- Live albums: 4
- Compilation albums: 1
- Video albums: 1

This article presents the discography of the American jazz trumpeter, flugelhorn player, and producer Roy Hargrove (1969–2018).

== Studio albums ==
=== Novus/RCA Records studio albums ===
Release date	Album	Catalog No.	Personnel, notes	Recording date
April 13, 1990	Diamond in the Rough	PD90471	Hargrove (tpt), Antonio Hart (asax), Ralph Moore (tsax), Geoffrey Keezer (p), John Hicks (p), Charles Fambrough (db), Scott Colley (db), Al Foster (dr), Ralph Peterson Jr. (dr); Larry Clothier (producer)	December 1989
March 25, 1991	Public Eye	PD83113	Hargrove (tpt), Antonio Hart (asax), Stephen Scott (p), Christian McBride (db), Billy Higgins (dr); Larry Clothier (producer)	October 1990
April 8, 1992	The Vibe	PD90668	Hargrove (tpt), Antonio Hart (asax), Branford Marsalis (tsax), David "Fathead" Newman (tsax), Frank Lacy (trbn), Marc Cary (p), "Cap'n" Jack McDuff (B3 organ), Rodney Whitaker (db), Gregory Hutchinson (dr); Larry Clothier (producer)	—
1994	Approaching Standards	Novus/RCA/BMG (01241 63178-2)	Hargrove (tpt, fgh), Antonio Hart (asax), Ron Blake (tsax, ssax), Frank Lacy (trbn), John Hicks (p), Stephen Scott (p), Marc Cary (p), Scott Colley (db), Christian McBride (db), Rodney Whitaker (db), Al Foster (dr), Billy Higgins (dr), Gregory Hutchinson (dr); Larry Clothier (producer). Compilation of tracks from 4 albums.	December 1989 – February 1993
"—" denotes dates that are unknown.

=== Verve Records studio albums ===
Release date	Album	Catalog No.	Personnel, notes	Recording date
May 1994	With the Tenors of Our Time	523 019-2	Credited to the Roy Hargrove Quintet. Hargrove (tpt, fgh; producer), Ron Blake (tsax, ssax), Cyrus Chestnut (p), Rodney Whitaker (db), Gregory Hutchinson (dr), Stanley Turrentine (tsax), Johnny Griffin (tsax), Branford Marsalis (tsax), Joe Henderson (tsax), Joshua Redman (tsax); Larry Clothier (producer)	December 28, 1993 (tracks 2 & 6); January 16 & 17, 1994
June 20, 1995	Family	314,527,630-2	Hargrove (tpt, fgh; producer), Wynton Marsalis (tpt), David "Fathead" Newman (tsax, fl), Ron Blake (tsax, ssax), Jesse Davis (asax), John Hicks (p), Larry Willis (p), Ronnie Mathews (p), Stephen Scott (p), Christian McBride (db), Rodney Whitaker (db), Walter Booker (db), Gregory Hutchinson (dr), Jimmy Cobb (dr), Karriem Riggins (dr), Lewis Nash (dr); Larry Clothier (producer)	January 26–29, 1995
1995	Parker's Mood	314,527,907-2	Hargrove (tpt, fgh), Christian McBride (db), Stephen Scott (dr); Don Sickler (producer), Richard Seidel (producer)	April 12–14, 1995
1997	Habana	314,537,563-2	Credited to Roy Hargrove's Crisol. Latin Jazz Grammy Winner. Hargrove (tpt, fgh; producer), Gary Bartz (asax, ssax), David Sánchez (tsax, ssax), Frank Lacy (trbn), Chucho Valdés (p), John Hicks (p), Russell Malone (gtr), Jorge Reyes – (bgtr), John Benitez (db), Horacio "El Negro" Hernández (dr), Idris Muhammad (dr), Miguel "Angá" Díaz (congas), Jose Luis "Changuito" Quintana (timbales); Larry Clothier (producer)	January 5 & 6, 1997
2000	Moment to Moment	314,543,540-2	Hargrove (tpt, fgh; producer, string arranging), Sherman Irby (asax), Larry Willis (piano; string arranging), Gerald Cannon (db), Willie Jones III (dr), Monterey Jazz Festival Chamber Orchestra: Raymond Harry Brown (conductor), Gil Goldstein (conductor; string arranging), Cedar Walton (string arranging), Susan C. Brown (concertmaster, concertmaster coordinator), Alice Talbot (vl), Ben Blechman (vl), Carol Kutsch (vl), Cynthia Baehr (vl), Jenny Bifano (vl), Pat Burnam (vl), Sally Dalke (vl), Eleanor Angel (vla), Ken Harrison (vla), Sarah Hart (vla), Aria DiSalvio (vlc), Daniel Levitov (vlc), Karen Andrei (vlc), St. Bass (vlc), Stan Poplin (cb), Tom Derthick (cb) Larry Clothier (producer), Tommy LiPuma (producer), Jason Olaine (producer)	October 4–10, 1999
May 2002	Directions in Music: Live at Massey Hall	314,589,654-2	Grammy Award for Best Jazz Instrumental Album, Individual or Group of 2003. Hargrove (tpt, fgh), Michael Brecker (tsax; producer), Herbie Hancock (p; producer), John Patitucci (db), Brian Blade (dr), Jason Olaine (producer), Todd Fraracci (producer)	October 25, 2001
May 20, 2003	Hard Groove	065 192-2	Credited to the RH Factor. Hargrove (tpt, fgh, p, kbd, bass, perc, bgv; arranging, production), Anthony Hamilton (voc), Common (voc), Erykah Badu (voc), Q-Tip (voc), Renée Neufville (voc), Shelby Johnson (voc), Stephanie McKay (voc), D'Angelo (voc, bgv, Wurlitzer), Karl Denson (fl), Jacques Schwarz-Bart (fl, ssax, ttsax, acg), Steve Coleman (asax), Keith Anderson (asax, tsax), Keith Loftis (tsax), Maurice Brown (tpt, bgv), Chalmers "Spanky" Alford (gtr), Cornell Dupree (gtr), Bernard Wright (p, kbd, B3 organ, ARP synth, bgv), Bobby Sparks (kbd, B3 organ, Rhodes, ARP synth, clavinet), James Poyser (p, kbd, Rhodes, bgv), Marc Cary (Wurlitzer), Tony Suggs (B3 organ), Pino Palladino (bgtr), John Arthur Lee (bgtr), Reggie Washington (db, bgtr), Meshell Ndegeocello (bass), Daniel Moreno (perc), Kwaku Kwaakye Obeng (perc), Gene Lake (dr), Willie Jones III (dr), Jason Thomas (dr, bgv), G. Craig "Butter" Glanville (dr, dr machine, bgv), Dontae Winslow (dr machine, finger snaps, bgv); Larry Clothier (producer)	January–September, 2002
September 28, 2004	Strength EP	B0003157-02	Credited to the RH Factor. Includes unreleased Hard Groove (2003) sessions. Hargrove (tpt, fgh, kbd, bass, perc, voc, bgv; production), Alfredo Alias (voc), Gordon Chambers (voc), Omar Lye-Fook, (voc), Renée Neufville (voc), G. Craig "Butter" Glanville (bgv), Maurice Brown (bgv), Rhian Ayanna (bgv), Somi (bgv), Vivien Goldman (bgv), Keith Anderson (a.k.a. DNK) (asax, tsax), Jacques Schwarz-Bart (tsax, fl), Karl Denson (tsax), Chalmers "Spanky" Alford (gtr), Fran Cathcart (acg, gtr, dr programming), James Poyser (kbd, bgv), Bernard Wright (p, Roland XP-80 synth, Rhodes), Bobby Sparks (kbd, B3 organ, Wurlitzer, Clavinet, ARP String synth), Brian Michel Bacchus (Korg synth), Pino Palladino (bass), Reggie Washington (bass), Willie Jones III (dr), Jason "JT" Thomas (dr, voc), Dontae Winslow (MPC dr machine, bgv), Daniel Moreno (perc), Fred Walcott (perc), Kwaku Kwaakye Obeng (perc); Larry Clothier (producer), Dahlia Ambach Caplin (producer), Brian Michel Bacchus (producer), Funmi Ononaiye (producer), Russell Elevado (producer), Fran Cathcart (producer), Joe Claussell (producer)	January–September, 2002
May 2, 2006	Nothing Serious	B0006211-02	Promo version released in 2005. Hargrove (tpt, fgh; producer), Justin Robinson (asax, fl), Slide Hampton (trbn), Ronnie Matthews (p), Dwayne Burno (db), Willie Jones III (dr); Larry Clothier (producer), Dahlia Ambach Caplin (producer)	2005
May 2, 2006	Distractions [CD]	B0005987-02	Credited to the RH Factor. Hargrove (tpt, fgh, voc, clapping; producer), D'Angelo (voc; producer), Renée Neufville (voc, kbd, Wurlitzer, clapping), Keith Anderson (sax), David "Fathead" Newman (sax, fl, clapping), Todd Parsnow (gtr, clapping), Bobby Sparks (p, organ, kbd, Rhodes, Moog synth, Clavinet, clapping), Charles McCampbell (p, organ, kbd, Rhodes, Clavinet, clapping, voc), Lenny Stallworth (bass, clapping), Reggie Washington (bass, clapping), Jason Thomas (dr) Willie Jones III (dr, clapping); Dahlia Ambach Caplin (producer), Russell Elevado (producer)	—
October 18, 2024	Grande-Terre	1000162572 CD / 6805332 LP	Posthumous release. Hargrove (tpt, fgh; producer), Sherman Irby (asax), Jacques Schwarz-Bart (tsax), Frank Lacy (trbn), Ed Cherry (gtr), Larry Willis (p), Gabriel Hernández (p), Gerald Cannon (db), Willie Jones III (dr), Julio Barreto (dr, voc), José Luis "Changuito" Quintana (perc), Miguel "Angá" Díaz (perc); Larry Clothier (producer)	April 1998
"—" denotes dates that are unknown.

=== EmArcy Records studio albums ===
Release date	Album	Catalog No.	Personnel, notes	Recording date
June 2, 2008	Earfood	B0010997-02	Credited to the Roy Hargrove Quintet. Hargrove (tpt, fgh; producer), Justin Robinson (asax, fl), Gerald Clayton (p), Danton Boller (db), Montez Coleman (dr); Larry Clothier (producer)	September 19–21, 2007
August 25, 2009	Emergence	B0013289-02	Credited to the Roy Hargrove Big Band. Hargrove (tpt, fgh, voc; producer), Roberta Gambarini (voc), Bruce Williams (asax, fl), Justin Robinson (asax, fl), Keith Loftis (tsax), Norbert Stachel (tsax), Jason Marshall (bsax, fl) Ambrose Akinmisure (tpt), Darren Barrett (tpt), Frank Greene (tpt), Greg Gisbert (tpt), Jason Jackson (trbn), Saunders Sermons (trbn), Vincent Chandler (trbn), Max Seigel (btrbn), Saul Rubin (gtr), Gerald Clayton (p), Danton Boller (db), Montez Coleman (dr), Roland Guerrero (perc); Larry Clothier (producer)	June 16 & 17, 2008

== Live albums ==
Release date	Album	Label	Personnel, notes	Recording date
April 23, 1993	Of Kindred Souls	Novus/RCA (01241 63154-2)	Hargrove (tpt, fgh; producer), Gary Bartz (asax), Ron Blake (tsax, ssax), Andre Hayward (trbn), Marc Cary (p), Rodney Whitaker (db), Gregory Hutchinson (dr); Larry Clothier (producer)	—
July 23, 2021	In Harmony	Resonance (HLP-9060 / HCD-2060)	Posthumous release. Hargrove (tpt, fgh), Mulgrew Miller (p); Larry Clothier (producer), Zev Feldman (producer), George Klabin (producer)	January 15, 2006
October 13, 2023	The Love Suite: In Mahogany	Blue Engine (BE 0049-1)	Posthumous release. Hargrove (tpt), Jesse Davis (asax), Andre Hayward (trbn), Ron Blake (tsax), Marc Cary (p), Rodney Whitaker (db), Gregory Hutchinson (dr); Willie Jones III (producer)	1993
January 7, 2026	Live at KNKX	Roy Hargrove Legacy	Posthumous release. Hargrove (tpt, voc), Justin Robinson (asax), Ameen Saleem (bass), Tadataka Unno (p), Jon Batiste (p), Quincy Phillips (dr), Montez Coleman (dr)	2009 (track 4) & 2017 (tracks 1–3)
April 18, 2026	Bern	Time Traveler	Posthumous release. Hargrove (tpt, fgh), Sherman Irby (asax), Larry Willis (p), Gerald Cannon (db), Willie Jones III (dr); Zev Feldman (producer), James Batsford (producer)	May 4, 2000
"—" denotes dates that are unknown.

== Video albums ==
- 2010: The Roy Hargrove Quintet, Live at the New Morning (Universal/EmArcy, 2010)[DVD only]

== Appearances as member ==
Superblue

- 1988: Superblue (Somethin' Else [JP]; Blue Note, 1988)

Manhattan Projects
With Carl Allen, Donald Brown, Ira Coleman, and Kenny Garrett

- 1989: Dreamboat (Timeless, 1990)
- 1989: Piccadilly Square (Timeless, 1993)

Jazz Futures
With Antonio Hart, Benny Green, Carl Allen, Christian McBride, Mark Whitfield, Marlon Jordan, and Tim Warfield

- 1991: Live in Concert (Novus [US], 1993)

The Jazz Networks

- 1991: The Tokyo Sessions with Antonio Hart; alternatively titled Straight to the Standards (Novus/RCA/BMG, 1992)
- 1992: Beauty and the Beast (Novus [US]; Novus J/BMG Japan, 1993)
- 1993: Blues 'n Ballads (Novus J/BMG Japan, 1994)
- 1993–94: The Other Day (Novus J/BMG Japan, 1996)
- 1994: In the Movies (Novus J/BMG Japan, 1995)

Buckshot LeFonque

- 1994: Buckshot LeFonque (Columbia, 1994)

== Appearances as sideman ==
With D'Angelo

- 1998–99: Voodoo (Virgin, 2000)
- 2002–14: Black Messiah (RCA, 2014)

With Erykah Badu

- 1998–2000: Mama's Gun (Motown, 2000)
- 2001–03: Worldwide Underground (Motown, 2003)

With Jimmy Cobb

- 2006: Cobb's Corner (Chesky, 2007)
- 2008: Jazz in the Key of Blue (Chesky, 2009)
- 2016: Remembering U (Jimmy Cobb World, 2019) – posthumous release

With Johnny Griffin

- 1994: Chicago, New York, Paris (Verve, 1994)
- 2008: Live at Ronnie Scott's (In+Out, 2008) – live

With Roy Haynes

- Birds of a Feather: A Tribute to Charlie Parker (Dreyfus Jazz, 2001)
- Roy-Alty (Dreyfus Jazz, 2011)

With Shirley Horn

- 1995: The Main Ingredient (Verve, 1996)
- 1997: I Remember Miles (Verve, 1998)
- 2003: May the Music Never End (Verve, 2003)

With Jimmy Smith

- 1995: Damn! (Verve, 1995)
- 1995: Angel Eyes: Ballads & Slow Jams (Verve, 1996)

With The 1975

- 2015: I Like It When You Sleep, for You Are So Beautiful yet So Unaware of It (Dirty Hit, 2016)
- 2017–18: A Brief Inquiry into Online Relationships (Dirty Hit, 2018)
- 2018–20: Notes on a Conditional Form (Dirty Hit, 2020) – posthumous release

With others

- 1988: Bobby Watson & Horizon, No question about it (Blue Note, 1988)
- 1989: Ricky Ford, Hard Groovin' (Muse, 1989)
- 1990: Ralph Moore, Furthermore (Landmark, 1990)
- 1990: Frank Morgan, A Lovesome Thing (Antilles, 1991)
- 1991?: Antonio Hart, For the First Time (Novus, 1991)
- 1991?: Charles Fambrough, The Proper Angle (CTI, 1991)
- 1991: Sonny Rollins, Here's to the People (Milestone, 1991) – 2 tracks "I Wish I Knew" and "Young Roy"
- 1992?: Jackie McLean, Rhythm of the Earth (Birdology, 1992)
- 1992?: V.A., New York Stories (Blue Note, 1992)
- 1992: Philip Bailey, Billy Childs, Bobby Watson, Tony Williams, "Pride of Lions" (Sony Masterworks, 1992)
- 1992: Diana Ross, Stolen Moments: The Lady Sings... Jazz and Blues (Motown, 1993) – live
- 1993: Bob Thiele Collective, Lion Hearted (Red Baron, 1993)
- 1993: Steve Coleman, The Tao of Mad Phat (Novus, 1993)
- 1993: Rodney Kendrick, The Secrets of Rodney Kendrick (Verve, 1993)
- 1994: David Sanchez, Sketches of Dreams (Columbia, 1995)
- 1994: Marc Cary, Cary On (Enja, 1995)
- 1994: Christian McBride, Gettin' to It (Verve, 1995)
- 1994: Abbey Lincoln, A Turtle's Dream (Verve, 1995)
- 1996: Cedar Walton, Composer (Astor Place, 1996)
- 1996: Various Artists, "Dream Session: The All-Stars Play Miles Davis Classics" (Milestone/Fantasy)
- 1996: Oscar Peterson, Meets Roy Hargrove and Ralph Moore (Telarc, 1996)
- 1997?: Kitty Margolis, Straight up with a Twist (Mad-Kat, 1997)
- 1997: Fred Sanders, East of Vilbig (Leaning House Jazz, 1997)
- 1999: Curtis Lundy, Against All Odds (Justin Time, 1999)
- 1999–2000: Common, Like Water for Chocolate (MCA, 2000)
- 2000: Ray Brown Trio, Some of My Best Friends Are... The Trumpet Players (Telarc, 2000)
- 2001: Phil Woods, Voyage (Chiaroscuro, 2001)
- 2001?: Boz Scaggs, Dig (Virgin, 2001)
- 2002: Natalie Cole, Ask a Woman Who Knows (Verve, 2002) – 1 track "I'm Glad There Is You"
- 2003 John Mayer, Heavier Things
- 2003?: Randal Corsen, Armonia (AJA, 2003)
- 2005: Anke Helfrich, Better Times Ahead (Double Moon, 2006)
- 2005: Steve Davis, Update (Criss Cross Jazz, 2006)
- 2006: John Mayer, Continuum (Aware, 2006)
- 2008?: John Beasley, Letter to Herbie (Resonance, 2008)
- 2008?: Roy Assaf & Eddy Khaimovich Quartet, Andarta (Origin, 2008)
- 2008: Marcus Miller, A Night in Monte Carlo (Dreyfus/Concord Jazz, 2010) – live
- 2010?: Angelique Kidjo, Õÿö (Razor & Tie, 2010) – 1 track "Samba pa ti"
- 2010: Cyrille Aimée + Friends, Live at Smalls (SmallsLIVE, 2011) – live
- 2011: Laïka Fatien, Come A Little Closer (Universal Music, 2012)
- 2011?: Stan Killian, Unified (Sunnyside, 2011)
- 2003–11: Jim Martinez and Friends, He Keeps Me Swinging – Jazz Praise IV (Invisible Touch, 2011)
- 2015?: Ameen Saleem, The Grove Lab (Jando Music S.r.l., 2015)
- 2017: Johnny O'Neal, In The Moment (Smoke Sessions, 2017)
- 2018?: Kandace Springs, Indigo (Blue Note, 2018) – 1 track "Unsophisticated"
