= Approaching Standards =

1994 compilation album by Roy Hargrove

Compilation album by Roy Hargrove
- Released: 1994
- Recorded: December 1989 – February 1993
- Studio: BMG Studios, NYC; Clinton Recording Studios, NYC
- Genre: Jazz; post-bop
- Length: 63:38
- Label: Novus/RCA/BMG; 01241 63178 2
- Producer: Larry Clothier

Roy Hargrove chronology
Of Kindred Souls (1993)	Approaching Standards (1994)	With the Tenors of Our Time (1994)

Approaching Standards is a compilation album by trumpeter Roy Hargrove, with tracks taken from four sessions between December 1989 to February 1993, released on the Novus/RCA/BMG labels in 1994.

== Reception ==
Don Cross of AllMusic described the album as "A poorly put-together compilation" and that "Approaching Standards serves only to illuminate Hargrove's failure to understand ballad material on his earlier recordings. Ballads dominate the album, accounting for seven of the album's ten tracks; Hargrove generally interprets them in a cool, emotionally detached manner which can be quite off-putting." However, Cross noted that the album "somewhat more encouragingly also documents Hargrove's growth as a musician" with "'Everything I Have Is Yours / Dedicated to You'... find[ing] Hargrove in a more mature frame of mind, and point[ing] toward the much better albums he would soon make."

Professional ratings
Review scores
Source	Rating
AllMusic	2/5 stars
The Rolling Stone Album Guide	3/5 stars

== Track listing ==
No.	Title	Writer(s)	Length
1.	"Easy to Remember"	Richard Rodgers; Lorenz Hart	6:17
2.	"Ruby My Dear"	Thelonious Monk	6:17
3.	"Whisper Not"	Benny Golson	7:31
4.	"What's New"	Bob Haggart; Johnny Burke	5:10
5.	"September in the Rain"	Harry Warren; Al Dubin	7:23
6.	"You Don't Know What Love Is"	Gene de Paul; Don Raye	6:20
7.	"End of a Love Affair"	Edward C. Redding	8:05
8.	"Things We Did Last Summer"	Jule Styne; Sammy Cahn	5:38
9.	"Everything I Have Is Yours" / "Dedicated to You"	"Everything I Have Is Yours": Burton Lane; Harold Adamson; "Dedicated to You": Sammy Cahn; Saul Chaplin; Hy Zaret	4:48
10.	"My Shining Hour"	Harold Arlen; Johnny Mercer	6:09
Total length:			63:38

- Tracks 1–3 first appeared on Diamond in the Rough (Novus/RCA, recorded December 1989)
- Tracks 4–7 first appeared on Public Eye (Novus/RCA, recorded October 1990)
- Track 8 first appeared on The Vibe (Novus/RCA; unknown recording date, released April 8, 1992)
- Tracks 9 & 10 first appeared on Of Kindred Souls (Novus/RCA; various unknown recording dates, released April 23, 1993)

== Personnel ==
Musicians

- Roy Hargrove – trumpet, flugelhorn
- Antonio Hart – alto saxophone (4–8)
- Ron Blake – tenor and soprano saxophones (9, 10)
- Frank Lacy – trombone (8)
- John Hicks (1–3), Stephen Scott (4–7), Marc Cary (8–10) – piano
- Scott Colley (1–3), Christian McBride (4–7), Rodney Whitaker (8–10) – double bass
- Al Foster (1–3), Billy Higgins (4–7), Gregory Hutchinson (8–10) – drums
- Roy Hargrove Quintet – ensemble (9, 10)

Technical

- Larry Clothier – producer
- Jacqueline Murphy – art direction
- Amy Wenzler – design
- Ruedi Hofmann – photography
