= Libor Šmoldas =

Czech jazz guitarist, composer and educator

- Born: 17 February 1982 (age 44); Olomouc, Czechoslovakia
- Occupations: Jazz guitarist, composer, bandleader, educator

Libor Šmoldas (born 17 February 1982) is a Czech jazz guitarist, composer, bandleader and educator. He has released twelve albums as a leader and has also recorded and performed as a sideman. His collaborations include musicians such as George Mraz, Jeff Ballard, Sam Yahel, Bobby Watson, Adam Nussbaum, Brian Charette, James Morrison, Jay Anderson and Nigel Price.

Šmoldas has performed in Europe, the United States, Australia and elsewhere. His 2026 album Sorry, Miles! was reviewed by international jazz publications including Rhythms and Jazz Journal.

== Early life and education ==
Šmoldas was born on 17 February 1982 in Olomouc and grew up in Prague. He began his musical training on flute and trumpet and took up guitar at the age of twelve. He initially played rock and blues before becoming interested in jazz.

He studied jazz guitar at the Jaroslav Ježek Conservatory in Prague from 2001 to 2003 and continued at its higher professional school from 2003 to 2006. He later completed a bachelor's programme in jazz guitar at the Janáček Academy of Music and Performing Arts in Brno and a master's programme at the Academy of Performing Arts in Prague.

In 2005, Šmoldas received a scholarship to Berklee College of Music, but did not take it up. In 2009 he spent an extended period in the United States, where he studied with several New York-based guitarists.

== Career ==
=== Organic Quartet ===
Šmoldas was a member of the Organic Quartet, led by organist Ondřej Pivec. The group was formed by students of the Jaroslav Ježek Conservatory and recorded the albums Don't Get Ideas and Never Enough.

The group's 2006 album Don't Get Ideas received the Anděl Award for Jazz Album of the Year. A review in All About Jazz described the quartet's music as rooted in the organ-trio tradition while highlighting Šmoldas's guitar playing and rhythmic approach.

=== Work as a bandleader ===
Šmoldas began recording as a bandleader with On the Playground in 2007. The album featured Šmoldas with organist Ondřej Pivec and drummer Łukasz Żyta.

His second album, In New York On Time, was recorded in New Jersey in 2009 and released by Animal Music in 2010. The album featured pianist Sam Yahel, bassist George Mraz and drummer Jeff Ballard, with vocals by Zeurítia. Its repertoire combined Šmoldas's original compositions with instrumental arrangements of songs by Frederick Loewe from the musical My Fair Lady.

He followed it with Live at Jazz Dock (2011), 18 Days, 2000 Miles (2012) and Intuition (2013). 18 Days, 2000 Miles was recorded in the United States following a tour by the Libor Šmoldas Quartet, while Intuition featured saxophonist Bobby Watson.

=== NYC Trio and other projects ===
Šmoldas has led the Libor Šmoldas NYC Trio with bassist Jay Anderson and drummer Adam Nussbaum. The trio recorded Dreamtime, On the Move and Dusk and has performed in Europe and the United States.

His solo guitar projects include Blue – Šmoldas Plays Ježek (2015), consisting primarily of arrangements of compositions by Czech composer Jaroslav Ježek, and Silver (2019), which presents arrangements of music associated with Czechoslovak films.

In 2017, he released Lay It Down! with his Organ Trio, featuring organist Jakub Zomer and drummer Václav Pálka. The trio's music draws on the soul-jazz tradition of the 1960s.

=== International activity and collaborations ===
Šmoldas has performed internationally in Europe, the United States and Australia. His performances have included venues such as the Kennedy Center in Washington, D.C., and jazz clubs in London, New York and other cities.

He has worked and recorded with international jazz musicians including George Mraz, Jeff Ballard, Sam Yahel, Bobby Watson, Adam Nussbaum, Brian Charette, James Morrison, Jay Anderson, Gregory Hutchinson, Jon Faddis and Nigel Price.

In 2026, Jazz Guitar Today published an article on Šmoldas and the Czech jazz guitar scene, discussing his career and current projects.

=== Sorry, Miles! ===
In 2026, Šmoldas released Sorry, Miles! with the Libor Šmoldas Quartet on Bivak Records. The quartet consists of Šmoldas on guitar, Mikuláš Pokorný on piano, Tomáš Baroš on double bass and Jesse Simpson on drums. The album was released on 6 March 2026.

The project was developed around the centenary of the birth of Miles Davis and explores compositions closely associated with Davis whose authorship has been disputed, alongside original compositions by Šmoldas inspired by Davis's music and visual art.

The album was recorded on 6 and 7 November 2025 in Svárov, Czech Republic.

Rhythms reviewed the album in June 2026, describing it as a tribute to Davis and discussing Šmoldas's arrangements of repertoire associated with Davis, including "Four", "Tune Up", "Dig" and "Donna Lee". The review also highlighted Šmoldas's playing and the interaction within the quartet.

In September 2026, Jazz Journal reviewed Sorry, Miles! and described the quartet's treatment of the material in terms of a modern post-bop approach. The review particularly noted the interaction between Šmoldas and pianist Mikuláš Pokorný.

=== Teaching ===
Šmoldas has taught at the Jaroslav Ježek Conservatory and its higher professional school in Prague since 2006. He also conducts jazz workshops in the Czech Republic and internationally, including in Australia, the United Kingdom, Germany, Italy, the United States, Poland and Greece.

== Style ==
Šmoldas's playing has been described in terms of straight-ahead jazz and bebop, while also incorporating elements of modern jazz, Brazilian music, blues, funk and soul jazz.

A review of the Organic Quartet's Don't Get Ideas in All About Jazz noted his rhythmic assertiveness and his guitar playing within the modern mainstream jazz idiom.

A 2026 review of Sorry, Miles! in Rhythms described Šmoldas's playing as clean and fluid and discussed influences including Kenny Burrell, Wes Montgomery and Jim Hall.

== Awards ==
- Anděl Award for Jazz Album of the Year (2006), with Organic Quartet for Don't Get Ideas
- Award at the Straubing Festival (2009), with Organic Quartet
- Petrof Award (2011), for the composition Lydian Blues
- OSA and Bohemia JazzFest award for Best Jazz Composition (2014), for Letter Home

== Discography ==
=== As leader ===
- On the Playground (Animal Music, 2007)
- In New York On Time (Animal Music, 2010)
- Live at Jazz Dock (Animal Music, 2011)
- 18 Days, 2000 Miles (New Port Line, 2012)
- Intuition (New Port Line, 2013)
- Dreamtime (New Port Line, 2015)
- Blue – Šmoldas Plays Ježek (2015)
- On the Move (2016)
- Lay It Down! (2017)
- Silver (2019)
- Dusk (2020)
- Sorry, Miles! (2026)
