= Chris Bergson =

American guitarist, singer, and songwriter

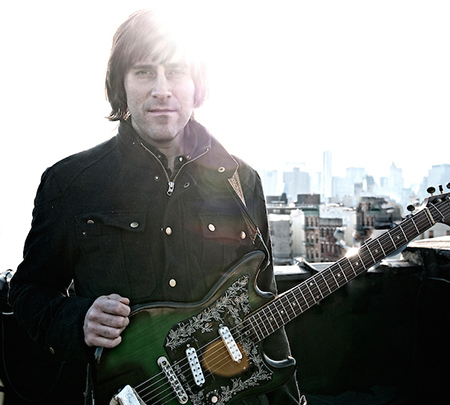

Background information
- Born: May 24, 1976 (age 50); New York, New York, U.S.
- Occupations: Guitarist, singer, songwriter and educator
- Instruments: Guitar, vocals
- Website: www.chrisbergson.com

Chris Bergson (born May 24, 1976) is an American born guitarist, singer and songwriter. Chris Bergson was inducted into the New York Blues Hall of Fame as a Master Blues Artist in 2015.

== Early life ==
Bergson was born in New York, New York. In 1979, his family moved to Boston, Massachusetts before eventually settling in Somerville, Massachusetts. Bergson began taking guitar lessons when he was seven years old.

== Career ==
Bergson began his professional career in Boston, Massachusetts playing in Boston area rock clubs at the age of 13.

=== 1990's ===
In 1995, Bergson studied privately with jazz guitarist Jim Hall. From 1996 to 1999, Bergson attended Manhattan School of Music where he studied guitar with Rodney Jones and Jack Wilkins before graduating in 1999 with a Bachelor of Music degree.

In 1996, Bergson recorded his debut album, Blues For Some Friends of Mine (Juniper Records) featuring bassist Dwayne Burno and drummer Greg Bandy. "With his first release, Bergson proves himself ready for the big time," Jim Fisch wrote in 20th Century Guitar Magazine.

In 1997, Bergson recorded with thejazz vocalist Annie Ross on her album, Cool For Kids (Juniper Records.)

In early 1999, Bergson landed a steady gig at Vintage, a lounge in Manhattan's Hell's Kitchen, where he led a trio two nights a week backing up singers including Norah Jones, Sasha Dobson and Dena DeRose.

=== 2000s ===
In 2001, Bergson recorded a collaborative album Reunion of Souls with guitarist Sheryl Bailey and drummer Sunny Jain (Pure Music Records).

In 2002, Chris Bergson was appointed a Jazz Ambassador of the United States of America by the John F. Kennedy Center for the Performing Arts and the U.S. State Department and toured 8 countries in West Africa giving concerts and workshops.

In 2003, Bergson performed at New York City's Blue Note Jazz Club and recorded the EP, Blues, live at Smoke Jazz Club with organist Brian Charette and drummer Matt Wilson.

In 2004, the Chris Bergson Band was featured as Artists-in-Residence at New York City's Jazz Standard performing every Monday night in the Fall of 2004. "We were able to really develop as a band and that’s when I really started writing,” Bergson explained to writer Kay Cordtz in her profile of Bergson for Roll Magazine.

In October 2006, the Chris Bergson Band recorded their first album, Fall Changes at Levon Helm Studios in Woodstock, New York. The band included saxophonist Jay Collins, keyboardist Bruce Katz and drummer Tony Leone with Helm's daughter, Amy Helm, guesting on a few tunes. It was at these sessions that Levon Helm first heard Bergson play and Helm invited Bergson to play with his band at his celebrated Midnight Ramble concerts at his home in Woodstock. Bergson is one of the artists included in photographer Paul LaRaia's book, The Levon Helm Midnight Ramble. Fall Changes was released in October 2007 and received rave reviews including Living Blues magazine hailing Bergson as "a serious talent." As Blues scholar Tony Russell wrote in his four star review of the album for Mojo, "One of the major themes in blues is a sense of place, and this band lay down their local credentials in the opening track about a Brooklyn neighborhood, Gowanus Heights. The catchy melody, stabbing horns and fervent vocal also establish that these guys could strip down the engine of a soulbluesmobile and put it back together blindfold." Fall Changes went on to be named MOJO's Number One Blues Album of the Year in 2008 by Tony Russell.

In 2006, Chris Bergson opened for Etta James at B.B. King's Blues Club in New York City.

In 2008, the Chris Bergson Band performed at the Kaslo Summer Music Festival in Kaslo, British Columbia, Canada where they backed John P. Hammond.

In 2009, Bergson joined the guitar faculty of New York City's 92nd Street Y School of Music. In March 2009, Bergson performed at the South by Southwest Music Festival in Austin, Texas. In May 2009, the Chris Bergson Band toured in Europe for the first time including performances at Holland's Moulin Blues Festival in Ospel, Netherlands and Rhythm and Blues Night in Groningen, Netherlands. In August 2009, Bergson performed with Howlin' Wolf guitarist Hubert Sumlin at the Bearsville Theater in Woodstock, New York along with keyboardist Bruce Katz and drummer Randy Ciarlante.

=== 2010s ===
In 2010, the Chris Bergson Band including keyboardist Bruce Katz toured Europe including performances at Norway's Blues in Hell Festival and Ireland's Harvest Time Blues Festival.

Upon their return from Europe, the band recorded their third studio album, Imitate the Sun, at Brooklyn's Excello Recording with Hugh Pool engineering. Released in 2011, the album featured tenor saxophonist Jay Collins, keyboardist Bruce Katz, bassist Matt Clohesy and drummer Tony Leone as well as a horn section arranged by Jay Collins with trumpeter Kenny Rampton and baritone saxophonist Chris Karlic.

In 2012, Chris Bergson opened for B. B. King at B.B. King's Blues Club in New York City.

In 2013, Bergson began writing songs and performing with the soul singer Ellis Hooks.

In June 2013, the Chris Bergson Band recorded a live album over two nights at New York City's Jazz Standard club featuring Ellis Hooks guesting on two songs, keyboardist Craig Dreyer and a three piece horn section arranged by Jay Collins including trumpeter Freddie Hendrix, tenor saxophonist David Luther and baritone saxophonist Ian Hendrickson-Smith. The resulting album, 2014's Live at Jazz Standard, was recorded and co-produced by Roman Klun and went on to be named one of MOJO's Best Blues Albums of the Year for 2014 by Tony Russell. As Tony Russell wrote in his review of the album for The Blues Magazine(UK),

In November 2013, Bergson performed for the first time in France at the Nuit du Blues Festival in Chaumont with the French musicians bassist Philippe Dandrimont and drummer Pat Machenaud, who would go on to be part of his regular European touring band for the next six years.

In 2014, the Chris Bergson Band, with the addition of French keyboardist Philippe Billoin, toured in Holland, Belgium and Germany and performed at the largest blues festival in North America, the Waterfront Blues Festival in Portland, Oregon.

In April 2015, Bergson performed at France's Salaise Blues Festival followed by performances later that year in August at Belgium's Gevarenwinkel Festival and France's Blues en Loire Festival.

In 2016, the Chris Bergson Band recorded their fourth studio album, Bitter Midnight, at Brooklyn's Mighty Toad recording studio featuring Ellis Hooks, baritone saxophonist Jay Collins, trumpeter Steven Bernstein, bassists Andy Hess, Richard Hammond, and Matt Clohesy, drummers Aaron Comess and Tony Mason, and keyboardist/tenor saxophonist Craig Dreyer.

In 2018, Bergson and Ellis Hooks toured in Europe together for the first time including playing France's Blues Party and Tracteur Blues Festival, Denmark's Fredericia Blues Festival and Germany's Ingolstadt Bluesfest. They also performed in Normandy at the Zenith de Caen stadium as part of the Backstage Blues Association's Nuit du Blues festival. Their performance was filmed and recorded and released in 2019 on CD and DVD as Live in Normandy. "Live albums don't get any better than this," wrote Jim Hynes in Glide Magazine. "Bergson and Hooks are both clearly on the rise...Bergson and Hooks have become a modern-day blues-infused Sam and Dave."

In March 2019, Bergson performed with master drummer Bernard Purdie along with keyboardist Dave Keyes and they would begin performing as a co-led group with Ellis Hooks later that year. In May 2019, Bergson performed for the first time in Russia at the Arkhangelsk Blues Festival. In June 2019, the Chris Bergson Band celebrated the release of Live at Normandy at New York City's City Winery augmented by a horn section featuring tenor saxophonist Michael Blake. In July 2019, the Chris Bergson Band featuring Ellis Hooks performed at France's oldest Blues festival, the Cahors Blues Festival.

=== 2020s ===
In September 2021, Chris Bergson was appointed an Associate Professor of Guitar at Berklee College of Music in Boston, MA where he currently teaches guitar privately in addition to small group classes in slide guitar and songwriting.

In 2022, Chris Bergson and Ellis Hooks returned to Europe for their first tour following the pandemic and they headlined Holland's Southern Blues Night and performed at An Evening With The Blues in Rotterdam.

In 2023, Chris Bergson and Ellis Hooks headlined two nights at Holland's Blues on the River festival along with France's Blues Blast festival and Les Nuits de Blues du Marnaz.

In June 2024, the Chris Bergson Band celebrated their twenty year anniversary with the release of their sixth album, Comforts of Home. Co-produced by Ken Rich and recorded at Brooklyn's Grand Street Recording, the album includes all original songs written by Bergson with his wife Kate Ross and two songs co-written with singer Ellis Hooks. The album features guests drummer Bernard Purdie, vocalists Ellis Hooks and Alexis P. Suter, and pianist Dave Keyes. The album received a four star review in MOJO Magazine with Tony Russell calling Bergson "as elegant and affecting as ever."

In February 2025, Bergson performed at Jazz at Lincoln Center's Blues Jam weekend in Frederick P. Rose Hall with guitarist Christone "Kingfish" Ingram, singer Ruthie Foster, organist Ronnie Foster and drummer Herlin Riley.

In May 2026, Chris Bergson released his eleventh album as a leader, East River Blues, featuring bassist Larry Grenadier, drummer Herlin Riley and tenor saxophonist Jay Collins. The album was co-produced, recorded, mixed and mastered by Scott Petito at NRS Recording in Catskill, NY. Jim Hynes of Glide Magazine called it "as pure and unadorned an album of classic jazz and blues as has been issued recently…The tone evokes the Blue Note soul-jazz of Lou Donaldson, Grant Green, and Stanley Turrentine, among others.”

== Awards and honors ==
Imitate the Sun was named one of MOJO's Best Blues Albums of the Year for 2011 by Tony Russell.

In February 2015, Chris Bergson was inducted into the New York Blues Hall of Fame as a Master Blues Artist.

Bitter Midnight was released in 2017 and was named "Album of the Month" by Holland's Gitarist Magazine and France's Soul Bag Magazine as well as landing again on MOJO Magazine's year-end list of the Best Blues Albums of 2017. Gitarist Magazine's Kevin Passman writes, "As we've come to expect from Bergson, Bitter Midnight is full of tasty, intuitive guitar work and passionate vocals but besides that, the album's also a triumph for his qualities as a composer. An absolute must for fans of blues, soul and southern rock."

Live in Normandy was named one of MOJO Magazine's Best Albums of 2019. Soul Bag Magazine's Marc Loison wrote, "Far from blues-rock clichés and guitar demonstrations in vertiginous pyrotechnics, here are 12 live tracks as additional proof of the vitality and authenticity of a major artist on the New York scene. In perfect harmony with the splendid vocalist Ellis Hooks, guitarist-singer Chris Bergson is accompanied by a "French connection" of choice: Philippe Billoin (keyboards), Philippe Dandrimont (bass) and Patrick Machenaud (drums)...Superb!" Jos Verhagen wrote in his review of the album for The Blues Magazine (Netherlands), "The music of Chris Bergson and Ellis Hooks is genuine Delta soul blues...The soulful voice of Hooks is reminiscent of the great soul men like Sam Cooke and Otis [Redding], and together with Chris he turns it into a true party."

All I Got Left was named one of MOJO Magazine's Best Albums of 2021.

== Discography ==
=== Recordings as a leader ===
- 1997 Chris Bergson - Blues For Some Friends of Mine (Juniper Records)
- 2000 Chris Bergson - Wait For Spring (Juniper Records)
- 2003 Chris Bergson - Blues (2 Shirts Records)
- 2005 Chris Bergson Band - Another Day (2 Shirts Records)
- 2007 Chris Bergson Band - Fall Changes (2 Shirts Records/Bertus Distribution)
- 2011 Chris Bergson Band - Imitate the Sun (2 Shirts Records/Bertus Distribution)
- 2014 Chris Bergson Band - Live at Jazz Standard (2 Shirts Records/Innsbruck Records)
- 2017 Chris Bergson Band - Bitter Midnight (2 Shirts Records/Continental Blue Heaven)
- 2021 Chris Bergson - All I Got Left (2 Shirts Records/Continental Blue Heaven)
- 2024 Chris Bergson Band - Comforts of Home (2 Shirts Records/Continental Blue Heaven)
- 2026 Chris Bergson - East River Blues (2 Shirts Records/Continental Blue Heaven)

=== Recordings as a co-leader ===
- 2012 Chris Bergson & Neal Miner - Playdate (Gut String Records)
- 2019 Chris Bergson and Ellis Hooks - Live in Normandy (2 Shirts Records/Continental Blue Heaven)

=== Recordings with other artists ===
- 2001 Neal Miner - The Real Neal (Juniper Records)
- 2001 Annie Ross - Cool For Kids (Juniper Records)
- 2001 Sheryl Bailey - Reunion of Souls (Pure Music Records)
- 2008 Jay Collins and the Kings County Band - The Songbird and the Pigeon (Sundown Recordings)
- 2017 Alexis P. Suter and the Ministers of Sound - Live at Briggs Farm (Briggs Farm Blues Records)
- 2018 Charlelie Couture - Même pas sommeil (Rue Bleue/Flying Boat)
- 2025 Dave Keyes - Two Trains (MoMojo Records)
