= Beauty and the Beast (The Jazz Networks album) =

1993 studio album by The Jazz Networks

Studio album by The Jazz Networks
- Released: February 1993
- Recorded: November 20 & 21, 1992
- Studios: Clinton Recording Studios, NYC
- Genres: Jazz; hard-bop
- Length: 58:03
- Labels: Novus/RCA/BMG; 01241 63185-2 (US) / BVJC-601 (Japan)
- Producers: Larry Clothier; Ikuyoshi Hirakawa

Roy Hargrove chronology
The Vibe (1992)	Beauty and the Beast (1993)	Of Kindred Souls (1993)

Beauty and the Beast is a studio album by the Jazz Networks, a group consisting of American musicians, trumpeter Roy Hargrove and saxophonist Antonio Hart, and Japanese musicians, pianist Yutaka Shiina, bassist Tomoyuki Shima, and drummer Masahiko Osaka. It features music from classic Walt Disney films and was recorded on November 20 & 21, 1992, and released the following year by Novus/RCA.

In August 2021, the album was re-released by Sony Legacy for music streaming platforms.

== Reception ==
Professional ratings
Review scores
Source	Rating
AllMusic	4/5 stars
The Rolling Stone Album Guide	4/5 stars

Scott Yanow, writing for AllMusic, stated: "Although the repertoire (ten songs from Walt Disney movies) does not seem too promising, these performances are actually pretty decent", continuing that, the ensemble turned such songs into "hard bop-styled jazz; an uptempo version of 'Someday My Prince Will Come' is a bit of a surprise while Hargrove's warm statement on 'When You Wish Upon a Star' is a highpoint."

== Track listing ==
No.	Title	Writer(s)	From	Length
1.	"Beauty and the Beast"	Alan Menken; Howard Ashman	Beauty and the Beast	5:53
2.	"The Bare Necessities"	Terry Gilkyson	The Jungle Book	5:49
3.	"Chim Chim Cher-ee"	Richard M. Sherman; Robert B. Sherman	Mary Poppins	8:23
4.	"He's a Tramp"	Sonny Burke; Peggy Lee	Lady and the Tramp	5:36
5.	"The Siamese Cat Song"	Burke; Lee	Lady and the Tramp	6:18
6.	"When You Wish Upon a Star"	Leigh Harline; Ned Washington	Pinocchio	4:43
7.	"Someday My Prince Will Come"	Frank Churchill; Larry Morey	Snow White and the Seven Dwarfs	5:31
8.	"Kiss the Girl"	Menken; Ashman	The Little Mermaid	5:41
9.	"Under the Sea"	Menken; Ashman	The Little Mermaid	3:47
10.	"Ev'rybody Wants to Be a Cat"	Al Rinker; Floyd Huddleston	The Aristocats	6:22
Total length:				58:03

== Personnel ==
Musicians

- Roy Hargrove – trumpet, arranging (2–4, 6, 10)
- Antonio Hart – alto saxophone (1, 2, 4, 5, 7–10), soprano saxophone (3, 6), arranging (5, 9)
- Yutaka Shiina – piano, arranging (1)
- Tomoyuki Shima – bass, arranging (8)
- Masahiko Osaka – drums, arranging (7)

Technical

- Larry Clothier, Ikuyoshi Hirakawa – producer
- Ed Rak – recording engineer
- Derrick Garrett – assistant recording engineer
- Tohru Yamana – mastering
- Jun Shibuya, Katsuya Takasaki – art direction
- Kumiko Katori – design
- Kan Okano – photography
