= Sam Yahel =

American jazz pianist and organist (born 1971)

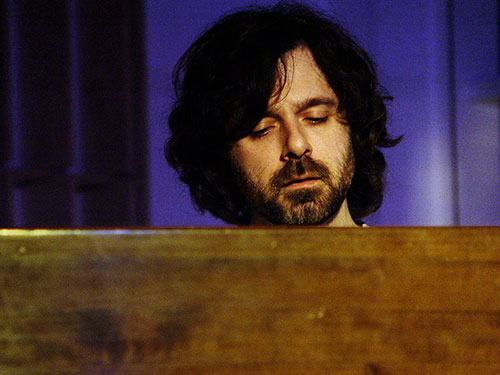

Background information
- Born: Europe
- Genre: Jazz
- Occupation: Musician
- Instruments: Piano, organ
- Years active: 1990s–present
- Website: samyahel.com

Sam Yahel (born 1971) is a jazz pianist and Hammond organist. In 1990 he moved to New York City and worked with Bill Frisell, Wycliffe Gordon, Ryan Kisor, Maceo Parker, Madeleine Peyroux, and Joshua Redman.

The jazz trio Yaya^{3} was formed in the late 1990s after Joshua Redman began jamming with Yahel and drummer Brian Blade during Yahel's recurring residency at Smalls Jazz Club.

== Discography ==
=== As leader ===
- 1996: Searchin' (Naxos, 1997)
- 1997: Trio (Criss Cross Jazz, 1999)
- 1999: In the Blink of an Eye (Naxos, 1999)
- 2005: Truth and Beauty (Origin, 2007)
- 2007: Hometown (Posi-Tone, 2009)
- 2010: From Sun to Sun (Origin, 2011)
- 2025?: Quiet Flow (La Reserve, 2025)

As leader of Yaya^{3}
Trio with Joshua Redman and Brian Blade

- Yaya^{3} (Loma, 2002)

=== Collaborations ===
With Ben Perowsky and Frank Perowsky

- Bop On Pop (JazzKey Music, 2003)

With Bob Belden, Nicholas Payton, John Hart and Billy Drummond

- Mysterious Shorter (Chesky, 2006)

With Ari Hoenig, Mike Moreno and Seamus Blake

- Jazz Side of the Moon (Chesky, 2008) – rec. 2007

=== As sideman ===
With Ralph Bowen

- 2001: Soul Proprietor (Criss Cross Jazz, 2002)
- 2007: Five (Criss Cross Jazz, 2008)

With Norah Jones

- 2000–2001: Come Away with Me (Blue Note, 2002)
- 2003–2004: Feels Like Home (Blue Note, 2004)
- Compilation: Covers (Blue Note, 2012)

With Ryan Kisor

- 1997: Battle Cry (Criss Cross Jazz, 1998)
- 2002: Awakening (Criss Cross Jazz, 2003)
- 2002: The Sidewinder (Videoarts Music, 2003)
- 2003: Donna Lee (Videoarts Music, 2004)

With Joshua Redman

- Elastic (Warner Bros., 2002)
- Momentum (Nonesuch, 2005)

With Jesse van Ruller

- 2002: Circles (Criss Cross Jazz, 2003)
- 2005: Views (Criss Cross Jazz, 2006)

With others

- Laila Biali, Laila Biali (ACT Music, 2018)
- Massimo Biolcati, Incontre (Bandcamp, 2020)
- Peter Cincotti, On the Moon (Concord, 2004)
- Larry Coryell, Impressions (Chesky, 2008)
- Charles Davis, Plays the Music of Bent Jaeding (Fresh Sound, 2008)
- Tia Fuller, Diamond Cut (Mack Avenue, 2018)
- Wycliffe Gordon, Dig This! (Criss Cross Jazz, 2003)
- Jesper Løvdal, Free Fall (ILK Music, 2008)
- Önder Focan, Beneath The Stars: Yıldızların Altında (Blue Note, 1998)
- Brad Mehldau, Ma Femme Est Une Actrice (Warner, 2001)
- Madeleine Peyroux, Half the Perfect World (Rounder, 2006)
- Jim Rotondi, New Vistas (Criss Cross Jazz, 2004)
- Libor Šmoldas, In New York On Time (Animal Music, 2010)
- Torben Waldorff, Afterburn (Artistshare, 2008)
- Lizz Wright, Salt (Verve, 2003)
