= Molly Glynn =

American actress

Molly Ann Glynn
- Born: June 14, 1968; Hartford, Connecticut, U.S.
- Died: September 6, 2014 (aged 46); Evanston, Illinois, U.S.
- Occupation: Actress
- Spouse: Joe Foust
- Children: 2

Molly Ann Glynn (June 14, 1968 – September 6, 2014) was an American actress. She was a well-known Chicago stage actress, and also played several roles in film and television, including a recurring role on the television series Chicago Fire.

== Early life ==
Glynn, the youngest of five children, grew up as part of a prominent family in Hartford, Connecticut. Her father, William E. Glynn, served as mayor of Hartford in the 1960s.

She graduated from the Watkinson School and then Tufts University, where she studied theatre and classical mythology.

== Career ==
Glynn began her acting career on stage and in commercials. She made her network television debut in a May 1998 episode of Early Edition, in which she portrayed Mrs. O'Leary, the owner of the cow that purportedly started the Great Chicago Fire of 1871.

Glynn was a prominent member of the Chicago theatre scene and was a regular performer with the Steppenwolf Theatre Company, the Northlight Theatre, the Writers Theatre, and the Chicago Shakespeare Theater, amongst others.

== Death ==
Glynn died from injuries from a falling tree in September 2014. She and her husband Joe Foust were bicycling on the North Branch Trail in Erickson Woods, suburban Chicago, on September 5 when a sudden storm swept through; wind gusts in the area were over 70 miles per hour (110 km/h). The tree fell on them just as they were about to take shelter. Foust was not significantly injured, but Glynn died of her injuries on September 6 at a hospital in Evanston, Illinois.

Her death was described by the artistic director of Chicago's Writers Theatre as an "incalculable loss to the Chicago Theatre community." By September 8, a GiveForward.com memorial fund had collected $135,000.

== Personal life ==
At the time of her death, both her sons, from a previous marriage, were teenagers.

She spoke several languages.

== Filmography ==
- Early Edition (1998) (as Molly Glynn Hammond)
- No Sleep 'til Madison (2002) (as Molly Glynn Hammond)
- In America (2002)
- Last Day (2002)
- Low Note (2007)
- Something Better Somewhere Else (2010)
- Boss (2012)
- Ctrl + Life + Delete (2013)
- Chicago Fire (2013)
