= Inner Cry Blues =

Studio album by Grachan Moncur III
- Released: 2007
- Recorded: February 2007
- Studio: FM Recorders
- Genre: Jazz
- Label: Lunar Module Records; 10011

Grachan Moncur III chronology
Exploration (2004)	Inner Cry Blues (2007)

Inner Cry Blues is an album by trombonist and composer Grachan Moncur III. It was recorded in February 2007, and was released by Lunar Module Records later that year. On the album, Moncur is accompanied by saxophonist Mitch Marcus, trumpeter Erik Jekabson, vibraphonist Ben Adams, bassist Lukas Vesely, and drummer Sameer Gupta. Issued three years after Exploration, it was Moncur's second album following a lengthy hiatus, during which he wrote, taught, and dealt with dental issues.

Four of the six tracks are dedicated to major jazz figures: "G Train" to Duke Ellington, "A for Pops" to Louis Armstrong, "Blue Rondo" to Jackie McLean, and "Sonny's Back!" to Sonny Rollins.

== Reception ==
Professional ratings
Review scores
Source	Rating
AllMusic	4/5 stars
The Penguin Guide to Jazz	3/4 stars

In a review for AllMusic, Thom Jurek wrote: "This is one of those Moncur dates that walks... the inside line of post-bop and modal jazz... But the sense of space, color, and texture in his compositions pushes their boundaries a bit... This set has everything a jazz fan would want, and has enough compelling rhythmic invention and hard blues thematics to interest a younger generation... It's tough post- and hard bop jazz that is fresh, spirited, cool, and timeless. It will appeal to anyone with half an ear for the real thing."

The authors of The Penguin Guide to Jazz stated: "Moncur sounds like an elder statesman communing with vanished peers. He has acquired an other-worldly quality which sits well with vibist... Adams's attractively floating sound... great to hear such a senior figure back in action."

David Grundy, writing for EarTrip Magazine, commented: "this is good, straightforward swinging music. The musical language spoken by the group synthesises elements from cool jazz and hard bop, largely dispensing with Moncur's post-bop/avant garde vocabulary... the group's focus on a comfortable, unassuming organic melodic flow is attractive."

== Track listing ==
All tracks composed by Grachan Moncur III.

1. "G Train (For Duke Ellington)" – 11:34
2. "Inner Cry Blues" – 10:20
3. "Hilda" – 9:58
4. "A for Pops (For Louis Armstrong)" – 8:36
5. "Blue Rondo (For Jackie McLean)" – 11:23
6. "Sonny's Back! I.Sonny's Back II. Clifford Browning" – 8:49

== Personnel ==
- Grachan Moncur III – trombone
- Mitch Marcus – tenor saxophone
- Erik Jekabson – trumpet
- Ben Adams – vibraphone
- Lukas Vesely – bass
- Sameer Gupta - drums
