= Elastic (album) =

Studio album by Joshua Redman Elastic Band
- Released: September 10, 2002
- Recorded: March 2002
- Studio: Sear Sound, New York City
- Genre: Jazz
- Length: 64:19
- Label: Warner Bros.
- Producer: Joshua Redman, Matt Pierson, Sam Yahel, James Farber

Joshua Redman chronology
Yaya^{3} (2002)	Elastic (2002)	Momentum (2005)

Professional ratings
Review scores
Source	Rating
AllMusic	3/5 stars
The Buffalo News	3/4 stars
The Guardian	3/5 stars
The Penguin Guide to Jazz Recordings	3/4 stars

Elastic is a 2002 studio album by American jazz saxophonist Joshua Redman. The album was released on September 10, 2002, by the Warner Bros. label.

== Background ==
The album is considered as the Redman's first full-length record with electric instruments—after eight acoustic albums. Also, Elastic follows the self-titled CD by Yaya^{3}, which features the same lineup: Redman with keyboardist Sam Yahel and drummer Brian Blade. The Yaya^{3} CD was released on Loma Records, once the R&B subsidiary of Warner Bros. The concept for Yaya^{3} and Elastic began when Redman started playing with Yahel and Blade at the New York's Small's club in the late 1990s.

== Reception ==
David R. Adler of AllMusic wrote "Coming fast on the heels of Redman's collaborative Yaya3 date with the same players (organist Sam Yahel and drummer Brian Blade), Elastic is more about pop/soul-funk than jazz, but it doesn't sacrifice any of Yaya3's organic feeling and improvisational focus. Here, Yahel plays not only the Hammond organ, but also the Fender Rhodes, clavinet, and other assorted electric keys. Redman makes liberal use of overdubbing and signal processing, much of which is surprisingly subtle. The result is quite a lot of sound for three people, quite a lot of inspired blowing, and quite a lot of stylistic ground covered." John Fordham of The Guardian noted "...the afterglow, as so often with recent Redman discs, is surprisingly brief." The Buffalo News review by Jeff Simon noted, "Not a bad thing to be by a long shot. There is a ton of infectious grooves on this disc... It's a lot of fun. But, unlike his ambitious counterpart and contemporary James Carter, it only confirms that Redman is the authentic monster tenor of slackers everywhere."

Stuart Nicholson of JazzTimes added, "Redman remains more student than trailblazer here, more the eternal protege. But that’s enough, for now-hell, Elastic is a fun disc-and more searching questions about the emotional depth of his work can wait for another day." C. Andrew Hovan of All About Jazz wrote, "Although an audience's reaction to any artistic endeavor is ultimately personal, some pieces seem to speak with great fluency and attraction and others are more difficult to decipher. Redman's work here not only speaks with clarity but it also rewards repeated exposure. Any disc that keeps finding itself in my player, when so many don't merit much past two or three spins, recommends itself and Elastic does just that."

== Track listing ==
All tracks are written by Joshua Redman except track 4 written by Sam Yahel.

No.	Title	Length
1.	"Molten Soul"	8:07
2.	"Jazz Crimes"	6:42
3.	"The Long Way Home"	5:42
4.	"Oumou"	3:39
5.	"Still Pushin' That Rock"	8:26
6.	"Can a Good Thing Last Forever"	6:16
7.	"Boogielastic"	7:53
8.	"Unknowing"	3:27
9.	"News from the Front"	5:55
10.	"Letting Go"	5:06
11.	"The Birthday Song (Intro.)"	2:43
12.	"The Birthday Song"	4:36
Total length:		64:19

== Personnel ==
Musicians

- Joshua Redman – tenor saxophone, alto saxophone, soprano saxophone
- Sam Yahel – grand piano, electric piano (Fender Rhodes, Wurlitzer), organ (Hammond B3), synthesizer (Yamaha CS150, Korg MS 2000), clavinet (Hohner)
- Brian Blade – drums
- Bashiri Johnson – tambourine (tracks: 1, 2, 6, 7), shaker (tracks: 2, 6, 9), congas & bongos (track: 7)

Production

- Joshua Redman – producer
- Matt Pierson – producer
- Sam Yahel – producer (additional production)
- James Farber – co-producer
- Dana Watson – project coordinator
- James Farber – engineer (recording, mixing)
- Greg Calbi – engineer (mastering)
- Andy Snitzer – engineer (digital editing)
- Todd Parker – engineer (additional engineering)
- Keith Nelson – engineer (assistant)

== Charts ==
Chart performance for Elastic
Chart (2002)	Peak position
French Albums (SNEP)	133
US Top Jazz Albums (Billboard)	16
