= Ellis Hooks =

American singer

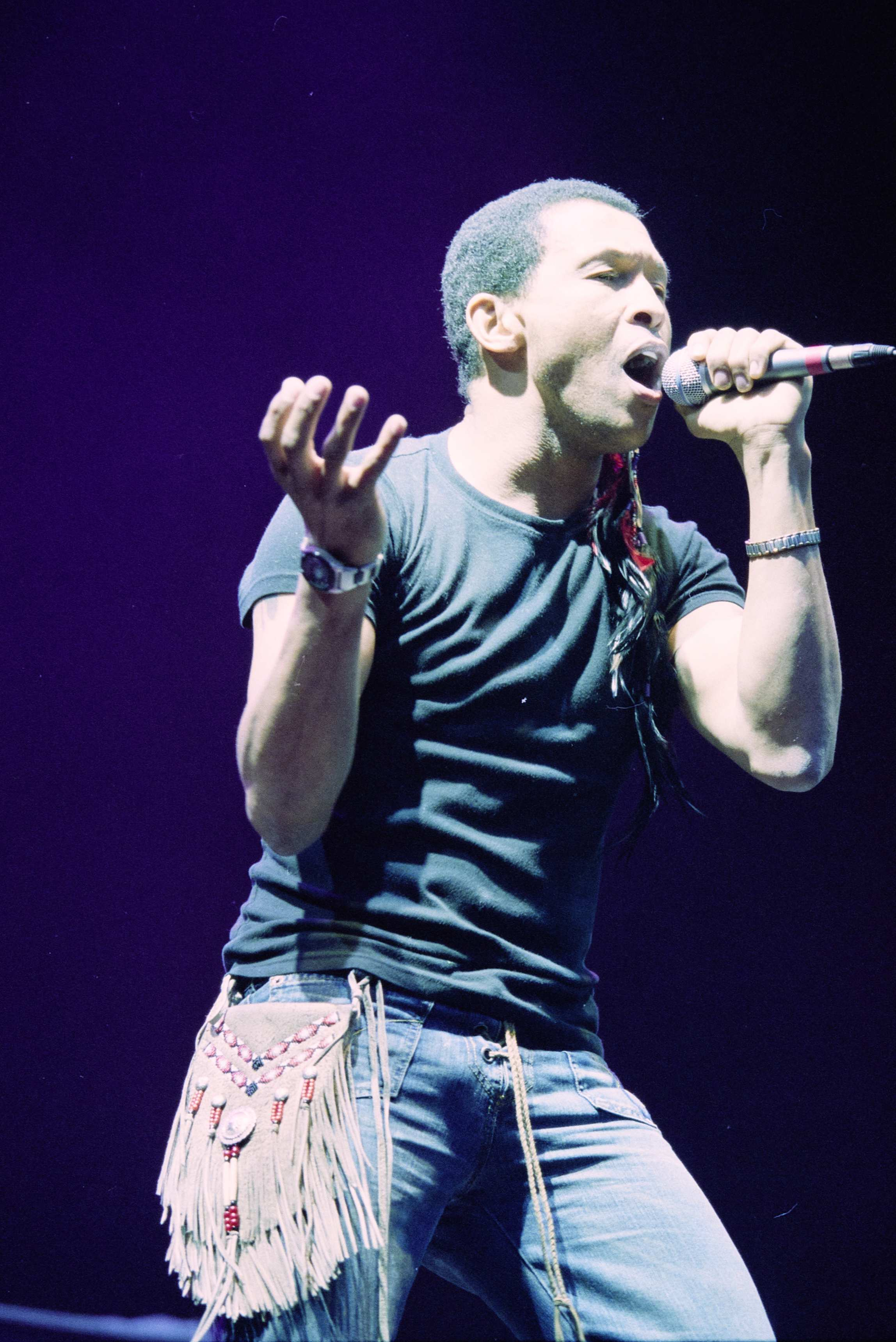
- Ellis Hooks, 2003

Background information
- Born: 1974 (age 51–52); Bay Minette, Alabama, United States
- Genres: Soul blues, electric blues
- Occupations: Singer, songwriter
- Instrument: Vocals
- Years active: Mid 1990s–present
- Labels: Evidence, Artemis, Zane

Ellis Hooks (born 1974) is an American soul blues and electric blues singer and songwriter, who has released eight albums to date.

The AllMusic journalist, Thom Jurek, noted that Hooks " touches upon Wilson Pickett, Sam Cooke, and Otis Redding, but feels like one of the gritty New York streets Hooks has busked upon."

== Biography ==
Hooks was born in Bay Minette, Alabama, United States, to a Cherokee mother and an African American father, who was a Baptist raised sharecropper. He was the thirteenth of sixteen children. By the age of fourteen, Hooks had heard secular music on the radio and left his strict upbringing. Subsequently hitchhiking across the United States, Hooks also travelled around Europe, residing in Paris and Amsterdam, before relocating to New York in his mid-twenties. After busking on the streets of the city, by accident he met the record producer, Jon Tiven, who produced Hooks debut album, Undeniable. Hooks secured headline status at the BBC's World Music Festival in 2003, and opened for Terence Trent D'Arby. Hooks also performed with Carla Thomas at the Montreux Jazz Festival. His 2003 album, Up Your Mind, was nominated for a Blues Music Award.

Uncomplicated (2004) was noted by one reviewer as "somehow both connects with the past while pointing ahead to the future".

The Hand of God (2005) was recorded in New York City and Nashville, Tennessee, and had five of its tracks mixed by Dan Penn.

His next recording, Godson of Soul, was also produced by Jon Tiven, and included contributions from Steve Cropper and Wayne Jackson.

Hooks' next release was Another Saturday Morning, issued in July 2007.

== Festival work ==
In May 2004, Hooks performed at Memphis in May.

Hooks appeared at the Kitchener Blues Festival in August 2014.

== Other recordings ==
In 2003, Hooks recorded his cover version of "Bulbs" for the Van Morrison tribute album, Vanthology: A Tribute to Van Morrison. In addition, Hooks recorded as a backing vocalist on Frank Black's 2005 album, Honeycomb. He performed similar duties in helping Little Milton record his album Think of Me in 2005. In 2006, Hooks backing vocals were part of Frank Black's release, Fast Man Raider Man.

Hooks' co-composed song "40 Days" was recorded by Howard Tate on his 2008 album, Blue Day; whilst Deborah Coleman had earlier recorded Hooks' co-penned song, "Undeniable", for her What About Love? (2004) release.

== Discography ==
=== Studio albums ===
Year	Title	Record label	Additional credits
2002	Undeniable	Zane	
2003	Up Your Mind	Evidence	
2004	Uncomplicated	Artemis	
2005	The Hand of God	Zane	
2005	Godson of Soul	Evidence	
2007	Another Saturday Morning	Evidence	
2015	Needle in a Haystack	Blues Boulevard	
2019	Live in Normandy	Continental Blue Heat	Chris Bergson / Ellis Hooks

== See also ==
- List of electric blues musicians
- List of soul-blues musicians
