= The Vibe (Roy Hargrove album) =

1992 studio album by Roy Hargrove

Studio album by Roy Hargrove
- Released: April 8, 1992
- Studio: BMG Recording Studios, NYC
- Genre: Jazz; post-bop
- Length: 61:04
- Label: Novus/RCA; PD90668
- Producer: Larry Clothier

Roy Hargrove chronology
The Tokyo Sessions (1992)	The Vibe (1992)	Beauty and the Beast (1993)

The Vibe is the third studio album by trumpeter Roy Hargrove (also credited as the Roy Hargrove Quintet), released on April 8, 1992, by Novus/RCA Records. The album's lineup includes Hargrove in a quintet with alto saxophonist Antonio Hart, pianist Marc Cary, bassist Rodney Whitaker, and drummer Gregory Hutchinson, plus a number of guest artists.

== Reception ==
Professional ratings
Review scores
Source	Rating
AllMusic	4/5 stars
The Rolling Stone Album Guide	3/5 stars

Scott Yanow, writing for AllMusic, commented: "Hargrove (still just 22) [is] already on his way to being one of the better hard bop-based trumpeters in jazz... A fine example of Hargrove's rapidly emerging style." Entertainment Weekly's Josef Woodard described the album as "yet further variations, though confidently stated ones, on the theme of '60s-brand jazz nostalgia", deducing that "The Vibe shows that Hargrove is still in the formative stages of a potentially brilliant career." Music journalist Angélika Beener, in an interview with The New York Times, praised Hargrove's third track, "Where Were You?", writing that he "delivers a soul-altering solo, channeling 50 years of jazz trumpet history and its future in every breath", and that "For all his reach, his home was always the ballad." The Rolling Stone Album Guide added: "Here the youthful core quintet plays with the more seasoned [musicians], who don't swing as hard as their counterparts".

== Track listing ==
All tracks are written by Roy Hargrove except where noted.

No.	Title	Writer(s)	Length
1.	"The Vibe"	Marc Cary	6:32
2.	"Caryisms"		7:02
3.	"Where Were You?"		5:02
4.	"Alter Ego"	James Williams	6:33
5.	"The Thang"		5:07
6.	"Pinocchio"	Wayne Shorter	4:53
7.	"Milestones"	Miles Davis	6:03
8.	"Things We Did Last Summer"	Jule Styne; Sammy Cahn	5:40
9.	"Blues for Booty Green's"		6:27
10.	"Runnin' Out of Time"	Cary	7:45
Total length:			61:04

== Personnel ==
Musicians

- Roy Hargrove – trumpet
- Antonio Hart – alto saxophone
- Branford Marsalis (6, 10), David "Fathead" Newman (4) – tenor saxophone
- Frank Lacy (6, 8, 10) – trombone
- Marc Cary – piano
- "Cap'n" Jack McDuff – Hammond B3 organ (9)
- Rodney Whitaker – bass
- Gregory Hutchinson – drums

Technical

- Larry Clothier – producer, mixing
- James P. Nichols – recording engineer, mastering, mixing
- Sandy Palmer Grassi – assistant recording engineer
- Roy Hargrove – mixing, liner notes
- Marc Cary – mixing
- Steve Backer – series director
- Ria Lawerke – art direction
- Jacqueline Murphy – design
- Ruedi Hofman – photography
