= Of Kindred Souls =

1993 live album by Roy Hargrove Quintet

Live album by Roy Hargrove Quintet
- Released: April 23, 1993
- Venue: See list: Bach Dancing & Dynamite Society, Half Moon Bay, CA; Dakota Jazz Club, St. Paul, MN; Jazz Showcase, Chicago, IL; Just Jazz, St. Louis, MO; Keystone Korner-Yoshi's, Oakland, CA; Kuumbwa Jazz Center, Santa Cruz, CA
- Studios: Clinton Recording Studios, NYC (mixing, sequencing, mastering)
- Genre: Jazz
- Length: 67:52
- Labels: Novus/RCA; 01241 63154-2
- Producers: Roy Hargrove; Larry Clothier

Roy Hargrove chronology
Beauty and the Beast (1993)	Of Kindred Souls (1993)	Approaching Standards (1994)

Of Kindred Souls is a live album by Roy Hargrove, his final release on the Novus/RCA label, on April 23, 1993. It features his then-quintet of saxophonist Ron Blake, pianist Marc Cary, bassist Rodney Whitaker, and drummer Gregory Hutchinson, with special guests Gary Bartz and Andre Hayward. It was recorded at various clubs in the Midwest and on the West Coast of the U.S. and would be Hargrove's only live release during his lifetime.

== Reception ==
Professional ratings
Review scores
Source	Rating
AllMusic	4.5/5 stars
The Rolling Stone Album Guide	3/5 stars

The Rolling Stone Album Guide wrote: "The Band swings fiercely, except on bassist Rodney Whitaker's languid ballads... Hargrove or group members wrote all but two of the tunes, which tend toward tonal introspection, but 'Gentle Wind,' 'The Left Side,' and 'Homelife Revisited' pack in the postbop fury." Ron Wynn of AllMusic stated: "There is a low-key feel to much of this music, even on tunes where he is doing superb technical maneuvering. [...] There is plenty that is enjoyable about the disc's 11 tracks, but there is never a sense of urgency, and it is time for Hargrove to assess the situation and see if it can be corrected."

== Track listing ==
All tracks are written by Rodney Whitaker except where noted.

No.	Title	Writer(s)	Length
1.	"The Left Side"	Roy Hargrove	6:48
2.	"Everything I Have Is Yours" / "Dedicated to You"	"Everything I Have Is Yours": Burton Lane; Harold Adamson; "Dedicated to You": Sammy Cahn; Saul Chaplin; Hy Zaret	4:49
3.	"My Shining Hour"	Harold Arlen; Johnny Mercer	6:15
4.	"For Rockelle"		6:16
5.	"Re-Evaluation"	Ron Blake	5:12
6.	"Of Kindred Souls"	Blake; Sue Schmidt	6:15
7.	"Mothered"		9:06
8.	"Childhood"		0:48
9.	"Homelife Revisited"	Hargrove	7:02
10.	"Love's Lament"		5:37
11.	"Gentle Wind"	Marc Cary	9:44
Total length:			67:52

== Personnel ==
Musicians

- Roy Hargrove – trumpet, flugelhorn
- Gary Bartz – alto saxophone (3, 4)
- Ron Blake – tenor and soprano saxophones
- Andre Hayward – trombone (3, 4)
- Marc Cary – piano
- Rodney Whitaker – double bass
- Gregory Hutchinson – drums

Technical

- Larry Clothier, Roy Hargrove – producer, editing, mixing, liner notes
- Steven Backer – series director
- Bud Spangler – director
- Troy Halderson – director, mastering, mixing
- Cookie Marenco, Dave Caires – recording engineer
- Larry McGee – assistant recording engineer
- Ed Rak – editing, mixing, mastering
- Gregory Hutchinson – editing, mixing
- Jacqueline Murphy – art direction
- Daniela Barcelo – design
- Clayton Call – photography
