= Sameer Gupta =

American percussionist and tabla player

- Born: July 1, 1976 (age 49)
- Origin: San Francisco, California
- Genres: Jazz, world music
- Occupations: musician, composer
- Instruments: tabla, percussion, drum kit
- Label: Motéma Music
- Website: sameergupta.com

Sameer Gupta (born July 1, 1976) is a Brooklyn-based jazz percussionist, tabla player, and composer. He is a co-founder of Brooklyn Raga Massive, the jazz ensemble The Supplicants and drummer for the Marc Cary Focus Trio. He has also worked with vidyA, Kosmic Renaissance, Grachan Moncur III, Victor Goines, Vincent Gardner, Sekou Sundiata, Sonny Simmons, Marcus Shelby, Calvin Keys, Richard Howell, Dayna Stephens, and Julian Lage.

The Jazz Observer called his playing kinetic, bass-heavy, and tender.

== Discography ==
- Namaskar (Motéma, 2010), with Marc Cary
- A Circle Has No Beginning (2018)

As sideman

- Focus, Marc Cary (Motéma, 2006)
- Inner Cry Blues, Grachan Moncur III (Lunar Module, 2007)
- Marc Cary and Focus Trio Live 2009 (Motéma, 2010)
