= For the Love of Abbey =

Studio album by Marc Cary
- Released: June 11, 2013
- Recorded: March 2012
- Genre: Jazz
- Length: 65:21
- Label: Motéma Music

For the Love of Abbey is a solo piano album by Marc Cary. It was recorded in 2012 and released by Motéma Music.

== Background ==
Pianist Marc Cary played with vocalist Abbey Lincoln for 12 years, until 2006. She died in 2010; this solo piano album is dedicated to her. It was Cary's first solo album.

== Recording and music ==
The album was recorded in March 2012. Cary commented that he chose the material based on which pieces that he and Lincoln performed together had most "stuck with" him. He added Duke Ellington's "Melancholia" and two originals – "For Moseka" and "Transmutate".

== Release and reception ==
Professional ratings
Review scores
Source	Rating
DownBeat	4/5 stars
Jazzwise	4/5 stars

For the Love of Abbey was released by Motéma Music on June 11, 2013. The Jazzwise reviewer wrote that "Cary's playing is packed with drama: orchestral-like ripples and flourishes, richly sustained chords, tremolos and pedal points, but the pianist is also grounded in the earthy rhythms and incantatory folk-melody of the African-American tradition". The DownBeat reviewer wrote: "Cary's performance shimmers with a Lincoln-esque ability to tackle nostalgia without sentimentality, sculpting blue chords and richly layered textures to reference the essence of the song's author while imbuing the music with his own rhythmic dynamism."

== Track listing ==
1. "Music Is the Magic"
2. "Down Here Below"
3. "Melancholia"
4. "For Moseka"
5. "Who Used to Dance"
6. "Should've Been"
7. "My Love Is You"
8. "Love Evolves"
9. "Throw It Away"
10. "Another World"
11. "When I'm Called Home"
12. "Conversation with a Baby"
13. "Transmutate"
14. "Down Here Below the Horizon"

== Personnel ==
- Marc Cary – piano
