= Momentum (Joshua Redman album) =

Studio album by Joshua Redman Elastic Band
- Released: May 24, 2005
- Studio: Bennett Studios, Englewood, NJ; Chez DiazBoothe; Royaltone Studios, North Hollywood, CA; Schway Sound; Sear Sound, New York, NY; Studio Yaya
- Genre: Jazz
- Length: 57:31
- Label: Nonesuch
- Producer: Joshua Redman, Sam Yahel, Paul Boothe

Joshua Redman chronology
Elastic (2002)	Momentum (2005)	Back East (2007)

Professional ratings
Review scores
Source	Rating
AllMusic	3.5/5 stars
All About Jazz	4.5/5 stars
The Buffalo News	2.5/4 stars
The Penguin Guide to Jazz Recordings	3.5/4 stars
PopMatters	5/10
Tom Hull	B+

Momentum is a 2005 studio album by American jazz saxophonist Joshua Redman's Elastic Band. The album was released on 24 May 2005 by Nonesuch label. All compositions are original works by Redman unless otherwise noted.

== Reception ==
Matt Collar of AllMusic wrote "Once again featuring the expansive keyboard talents of Sam Yahel, saxophonist Joshua Redman's Momentum features more of the '70s-influenced jazz the former "young lion" experimented with on 2002's Elastic. Bringing to mind works by such iconic artists as Miles Davis, Herbie Hancock, and especially Eddie Harris, Redman digs into sundry groove-oriented tracks such as the driving and punchy "Sweet Nasty," which finds Yahel and Redman soloing hard over drummer Jeff Ballard's James Brown-ready dance beat." John L. Walters of The Guardian commented, "...Momentum, a studio album by the Joshua Redman Elastic Band, marks a determined move towards juxtaposing jazz with funk, rock, hip-hop and studio-based experimentation, building on his basic trio of sax, keyboards and drums." Jeff Simon in his review for The Buffalo News observed, "It isn't that Redman's Elastic Band couldn't figure out freer and merrier ways to groove its way into future hip-hop samples (exploration is not exactly a bugaboo with them), it's just that at the moment, a motherlode of instrumental talent seems to be going into rhinestones and zircons."

In the 48th Annual Grammy Awards, this album was nominated for Best Contemporary Jazz Album.

== Track listing ==
No.	Title	Writer(s)	Length
1.	"Soundcheck"	Joshua Redman/Sam Yahel/Jefferson Ballard	1:26
2.	"Sweet Nasty"	Joshua Redman	6:20
3.	"Just a Moment"	Joshua Redman/Sam Yahel/Brian Blade	1:21
4.	"Shut Your Mouth"	Sam Yahel	5:37
5.	"The Crunge"	Bonham/Jones/Page/Plant	2:38
6.	"Riverwide"	Sheryl Crow	6:20
7.	"Greasy G"	Joshua Redman	4:35
8.	"Lonely Woman"	Ornette Coleman	6:11
9.	"Swunk"	Joshua Redman	8:15
10.	"Blowing Changes"	Joshua Redman/Sam Yahel/Brian Blade	2:10
11.	"Double Jeopardy"	Joshua Redman	4:41
12.	"Put It in Your Pocket"	Joshua Redman	6:52
13.	"Showtime"	Joshua Redman/Sam Yahel/Jefferson Ballard	1:06
Total length:			57:31

== Personnel ==
Musicians

- Joshua Redman – tenor saxophone, keyboards
- Sam Yahel – keyboards
- Jeff Ballard – drums (tracks 1, 2, 4, 8, 9, 13)
- Brian Blade – drums (tracks 3, 5–7, 10, 11)
- Flea – bass guitar (tracks 5, 10, 11)
- Stefon Harris – vibraphone (tracks 8–9)
- Peter Bernstein – guitar (tracks 11, 12)
- Jeff Parker – guitar (track 6)
- Eric Krasno – guitar (track 7)
- Meshell Ndegeocello – bass guitar (track 7)
- Kurt Rosenwinkel – guitar (track 9)
- Nicholas Payton – trumpet (track 12)
- Questlove – drums (track 12)

Production

- Joshua Redman – producer
- Sam Yahel – producer
- Paul Boothe – co-producer, engineer (mixing)
- Andy Sarroff – assistant engineer (mixing)
- Greg Calbi – engineer (mastering)
- Dana Watson – A&R administration
- Wayne Sharp – project coordination
- John Gall – design
- Michel Wilson – photography
