= Richard Plepler =

American media executive (born 1958)

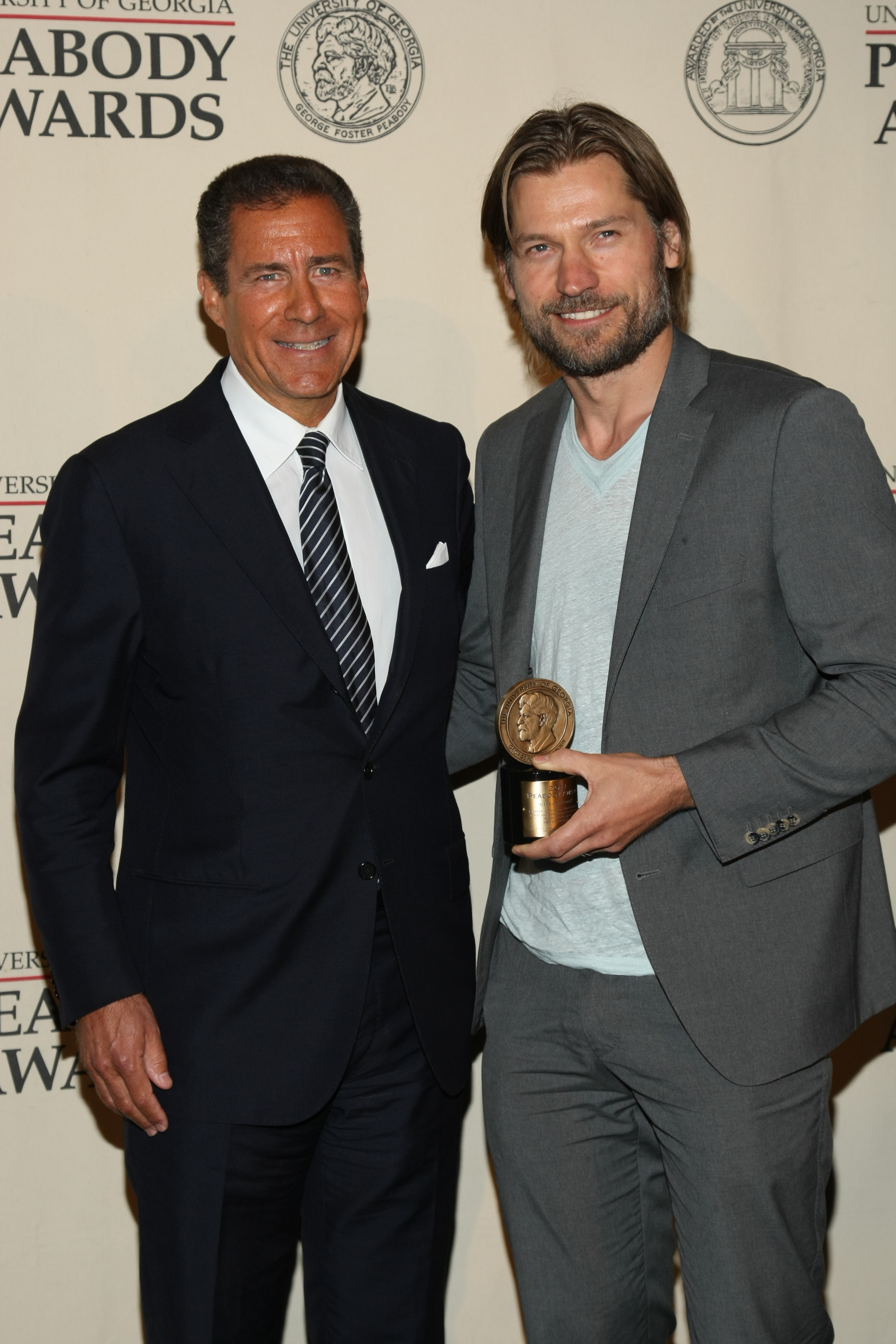
- Richard Plepler & Nikolaj Coster-Waldau, May 2012
- Born: 1958 (age 67–68); Manchester, Connecticut
- Occupation: Media Executive
- Known for: Former Chairman and Chief Executive Officer of HBO
- Spouse: Lisa Ruchlamer
- Children: 1
- Awards: International Emmy Directorate Award

Richard Plepler (born 1958) is an American media executive, who is said to have ushered in the second golden age of television, and former chairman and chief executive officer of Home Box Office, Inc. (HBO) a subsidiary of Time Warner Inc, and AT&T's WarnerMedia. After 28 years, on February 28, 2019, it was announced that Plepler was leaving HBO, eight months after the AT&T Time Warner merger.

In 2020, Plepler launched EDEN Productions and announced a five-year production deal with Apple TV+ to make television series, documentaries, and feature films.

== Biography ==
Plepler was born in Manchester, Connecticut, to a Jewish family. He is the elder of two brothers raised in Manchester. His parents were active in Democratic politics. His father was a trial lawyer. He attended the Loomis Chaffee School but ultimately graduated from the Watkinson School in Hartford in 1976 before attending and graduating from Franklin & Marshall College where he was a member of Chi Phi fraternity.

=== Early career ===
Plepler studied government in college and then moved to Washington in 1981 where he worked for Connecticut Senator Christopher Dodd.

In 1984, Plepler moved to New York City, where he opened a public relations firm and produced a series of interviews for The Atlantic magazine and a documentary on Israel and the Palestinian conflict.

Plepler joined HBO in 1992 as an Executive Vice President, at a time when the channel was known for showing movies and premium sporting events. He began his career as head of communications and rose through the ranks, In 2007, he was appointed and served as co-president of HBO from 2007 to 2013 (under Chairman & CEO Bill Nelson) responsible for overseeing all of HBO’s original programming as well as other areas.

=== Chairman and CEO at HBO ===
Plepler was appointed chairman and CEO of HBO in 2013 and held his position until 2019, culminating 28 years at the company. During that time, HBO launched Emmy Award winning series including Game of Thrones, True Blood, Boardwalk Empire, Veep, Last Week Tonight with John Oliver, The Newsroom, and Big Little Lies.

Under Plepler's leadership, the network's series won more than 160 Emmys; subscribership for HBO and sister channel Cinemax grew by nearly 40 million; and the HBO channels' revenue increased by $2 billion, a 40% increase. Plepler led the launch of HBO on digital platforms such as Amazon and Hulu.

Richard Plepler was known as the “ultimate deal maker” at HBO, known for building a culture of collaboration with executives and celebrities alike. He was a strong advocate of nurturing a health culture at the company, often saying “Culture eats strategy for breakfast” and emphasizing that at regular lectures he gave to students at Stanford, Columbia and Harvard business schools.

On February 28, 2019, it was announced that Plepler was leaving HBO. In his resignation memo, Plepler stated, "hard as it is to think about leaving the company I love, and the people I love in it, it is the right time for me to do so".

=== EDEN Productions ===
In January 2020, Plepler announced that he has started a production company called EDEN Productions, and that he and the company has signed a five-year deal with Apple TV+ to exclusively produce content for the streaming service.

==== The Problem with Jon Stewart ====
Jon Stewart’s new bi-weekly current-affairs series, The Problem with Jon Stewart, premiered on September 30, 2021, on Apple TV+.

==== Black Bird ====
Black Bird, a six-part limited series, came to Apple TV+ on July 8, 2022, starring Taron Egerton, Paul Walter Hauser, Ray Liotta, Greg Kinnear and Sepadoh Moafi. Written by novelist Dennis Lehane and executive produced by Plepler, the series is based on the 2010 autobiographical novel In with the Devil: a Fallen Hero, a Serial, and a Dangerous Bargain for Redemption by James Keene and Hillel Levin.

==== Franklin ====
In February 2022, Apple announced an eight-episode drama series Franklin based on the life of founding father Benjamin Franklin. Michael Douglas stars in this series based on Pulitzer Prize winner Stacy Shiff’s book “A Great Improvisation: Franklin, France and the Birth of America.” Filmed in France, the drama is directed by Tim Van Patten who serves as Executive Producer alongside Douglas, Plepler and Tony Krantz. Kirk Elis wrote the teleplay.

==== Lincoln's Dilemma ====
Lincoln's Dilemma is a four-part documentary series from Peter Kunhardt and EDEN Productions based on historian David S. Reynold's book Abe: Abraham Lincoln in His Times. The documentary series was released on Apple TV+ in February 2022 and includes insights from a panel of educators, scholars and journalists, all of whom provided a nuanced look at the life of Abraham Lincoln. Award-winning actor Jeffrey Wright narrates with Bill Camp and Leslie Odom Jr. voicing Lincoln and Frederick Douglass, respectively. The Daily Beast wrote that "Lincoln’s Dilemma should be required viewing for every American."

== Awards and honors ==
In 2014 Plepler was named Media Person of the Year by Cannes Lions International Festival of Creativity and in 2013 was inducted into Broadcasting and Cable Magazine's Hall of Fame. He was awarded the International Emmy Directorate Award for his impact on the industry from the International Academy of Television Arts and Sciences in 2015. That year, he also earned the prestigious 'Driver of Change' Award at the FT ArcelorMittal Boldness in Business Awards.

In 2016, Fast Company welcomed Plepler to their list of Most Creative People in Business and he won the Variety Vanguard Award for contribution to the TV business in 2017. Plepler was inducted into the Cable Hall of Fame in 2018.

== TV mentions ==
His name has been used in two HBO series as a gesture of respect from show runners David Chase (The Sopranos) and Larry David (Curb Your Enthusiasm). After being shot, Tony Soprano is overseen by a doctor whom Chase names Dr. Lior Plepler. Larry David’s character invoked Plepler’s name in reference to an expensive painting on his wall. He says, “It’s a Plepler!”

== Philanthropy ==
Plepler sits on the board of directors of the Council on Foreign Relations and serves on the board of trustees for the New York Public Library.

== Personal life ==
In 2002, Plepler married Lisa Ruchlamer; they have one daughter, Eden.
