= Watkinson School =

Private school in Hartford, Connecticut, United States

Location
- 180 Bloomfield Avenue; Hartford, Connecticut 06105; United States

Information
- Type: Private
- Established: 1881 (145 years ago)
- CEEB code: 070320
- Head of school: Teri Schrader
- Faculty: 48
- Enrollment: 275
- Average class size: 13 students
- Student to teacher ratio: 6:1
- Colors: White and Blue
- Mascot: Sam the Ram
- Website: watkinson.org
- Watkinson Juvenile Asylum and Farm School
- U.S. National Register of Historic Places
- U.S. Historic district
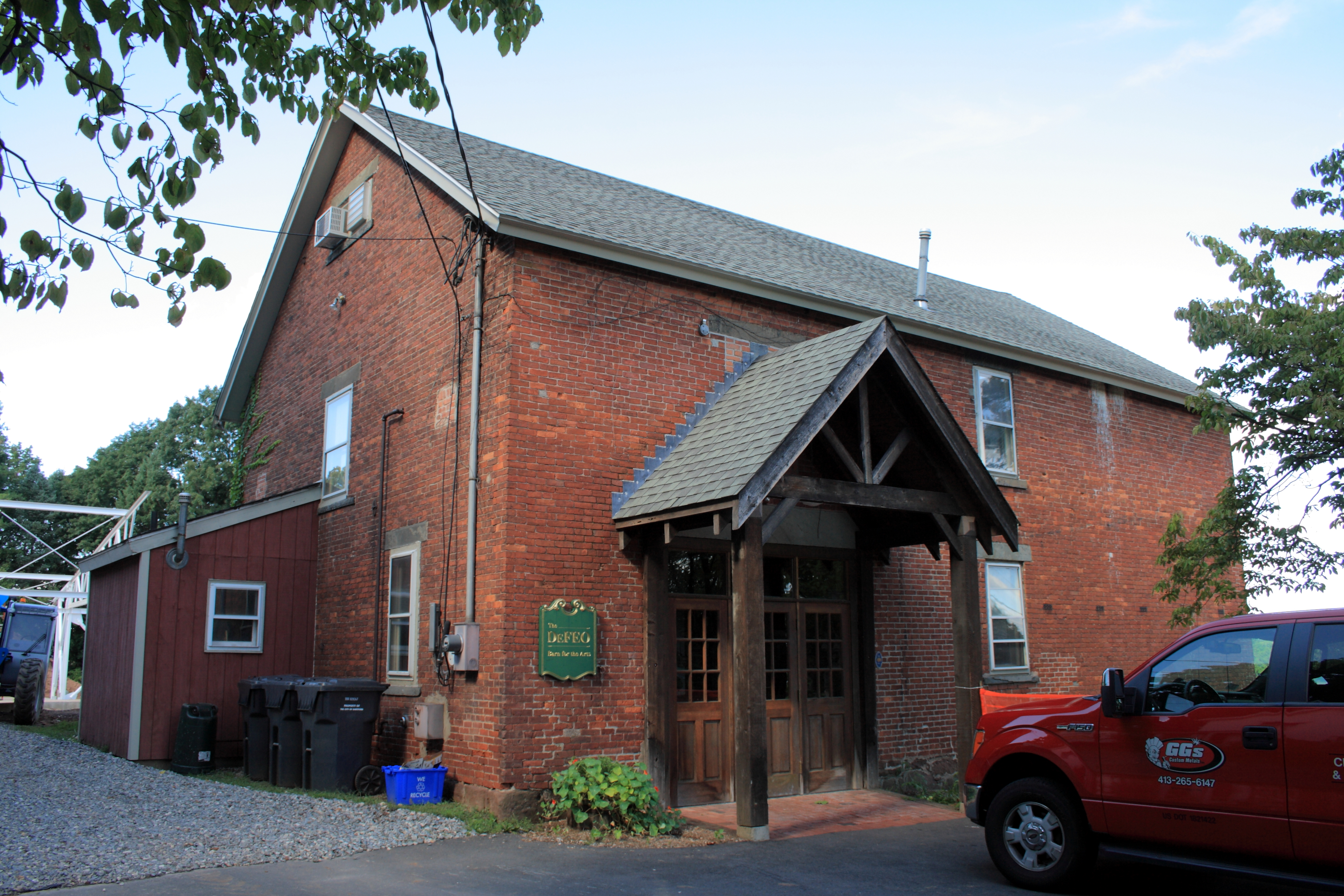
- Watkinson School art barn in 2009
- Location: 140, 180 and 190 Bloomfield Avenue, Hartford and West Hartford, Connecticut
- Area: 36 acres (15 ha)
- Built: 1881
- Architect: Goodwin, Francis; et al.
- Architectural style: Queen Anne, Colonial Revival
- NRHP reference No.: 95000273
- Added to NRHP: March 23, 1995

Watkinson School is a private co-educational independent day school in Hartford, Connecticut, United States. Watkinson is situated on Bloomfield Avenue adjacent to the University of Hartford. It serves students from 6th through 12th grade. Watkinson also offers a postgraduate option, called The Academy at Watkinson, which allows students who have just graduated from high school to spend an additional year taking courses at Watkinson as well as the University of Hartford. Watkinson is the oldest independent school located within the city limits of Hartford.

Currently, Watkinson enrolls 240 students who come from 37 towns all around the Greater Hartford and Pioneer Valley area.

Watkinson is a founding member of the Coalition of Essential Schools. It is one of only five schools to be named a Lead School for this coalition.

== Campus and early school history ==
The organization that became the Watkinson School has its origins in a major bequest of businessman and philanthropist David Watkinson (1778-1857), whose will included provisions for establishing a school for troubled boys. Originally led by noted Hartford educator Henry Barnard, school trustees built Watkinson's bequest to over $200,000 by 1880. In that year, a farm was purchased on Park Street, and the institution was opened as a school and working farm known as the Watkinson Juvenile Asylum and Farm School. In 1892, under the leadership of Rev. Francis Goodwin, the school leased land on the Prosser Farm at the corner of Albany Street and Bloomfield Avenue, which had been purchased by Goodwin for the Handicraft School, an organization whose leadership was identical to that of the Watkinson School. The Watkinson School facilities were built on this land at the northern end, while those of the Handicraft School were located in its south. The land occupied by the Watkinson School was formally transferred to the school in 1949. The school formally adopted the name "Watkinson School" in 1923.

The school campus is located at 140, 180, and 190 Bloomfield Avenue in Hartford and West Hartford. The complex consists of nine buildings on about 36 acres (15 ha), most of which (including all of the buildings) is in Hartford. Feringa Hall is the oldest academic building on the campus, built in 1894-5 to a Queen Anne design attributed to Francis Goodwin. Residence houses, originally for the headmaster and his assistant, date to the early 20th century. Frances Goodwin Hall is a two-story brick classroom building with attached gymnasium, built in 1924. The campus was listed on the National Register of Historic Places in 1995.

== In popular culture ==
The Watkinson School served as an inspiration for the 2023 film The Holdovers. The screenplay, written by David Hemingson, draws from his personal experiences at the school. While the film’s setting and story elements are fictional, they reflect the atmosphere and experiences Hemingson had during his time at Watkinson.

== Notable alumni ==
- Rashawn Dally - professional soccer player with the USL Championship
- Molly Glynn - stage, television, and film actor
- David Hemingson (class of 1982) - screenwriter and producer
- Samuel Kassow (class of 1962) - historian and professor of Ashkenazi Jewry
- Raheem L. Mullins - Connecticut Supreme Court associate justice
- Jeff Pitchell (class of 1984) - blues singer and guitarist
- Richard Plepler (class of 1976) - media executive and television producer
- Johann Smith (class of 2005) - former Premier League and Major League Soccer player

== See also ==
- National Register of Historic Places listings in Hartford, Connecticut
- National Register of Historic Places listings in West Hartford, Connecticut
