= Exploration (album) =

Studio album by Grachan Moncur III
- Released: 2004
- Recorded: June 30, 2004
- Studio: Bennett Studios, Englewood, New Jersey
- Genre: Jazz
- Label: Capri Records

Grachan Moncur III chronology
Shadows (1977)	Exploration (2004)	Inner Cry Blues (2007)

Exploration is an album by trombonist and composer Grachan Moncur III. It was recorded in June 2004, and was released by Capri Records later that year. On the album, Moncur is accompanied by saxophonists Gary Bartz, Gary Smulyan, and Billy Harper, trumpeter Tim Hagans, trombonist Dave Woodley, horn player John Clark, bassist Ray Drummond, and drummer Andrew Cyrille. The music was arranged by Mark Masters. It was Moncur's first album after a lengthy hiatus, during which he wrote, taught, and dealt with dental issues.

== Reception ==
Professional ratings
Review scores
Source	Rating
AllMusic	4.5/5 stars
The Penguin Guide to Jazz	3.5/4 stars

In a review for AllMusic, Scott Yanow wrote: "Dental problems resulted in Moncur only playing once in a great while in the 1990s. He had been in obscurity for quite a while when he was contacted by arranger Mark Masters for the Exploration project. Fortunately Moncur's playing proved to still be in his prime. Masters wrote sympathetic charts for many of the trombonist's finest pieces, utilizing an all-star nonet that could really dig into the inside/outside music... This CD overall is very rewarding, a dream project for those who have long admired the underrated Grachan Moncur. The musicians have their solos, there are both written and improvised ensembles and Moncur plays wonderfully throughout. This set, which sums up Grachan Moncur's career definitively, is a gem."

The authors of The Penguin Guide to Jazz stated: "This session... brings back into focus a major compositional figure... the emphasis as ever falls on the very fine writing and on a band of equally undersung players."

Writing for All About Jazz, Clifford Allen commented: "Though Moncur's music gives itself well to loose improvisational settings, wherein the soloists and group are highly liberated, the cohesive and tightly arranged nature of these readings brings out their inherent logic and structure in addition to their springboard-like qualities. It is both a testament to the pieces themselves and the empathy of this group (many of whom had not played together prior to rehearsals) that Exploration is as seamless as it is."

In a JazzTimes review, Harvey Siders remarked: "Moncur shows a youthful vigor in the title tune, exploring the tune's whole-tone structure with his velvety tone. 'Monk in Wonderland' captures Thelonious' staccato humor, providing Smulyan with his best solo moments. 'Love and Hate,' one of Moncur's darkest ballads, gives him a chance to show his highly personal side as soloist, and tenorist Harper matches the trombonist in introspection. 'New Africa,' a three-part suite, is also dominated by Moncur and Harper, but more interesting are the ensemble writing/playing and the strong walking by Drummond, free to roam in the pianoless environment. 'Excursion' is a nonstop free ensemble with more tonality than anarchy. Just about everyone solos in 'Frankenstein', with colorful statements coming from French hornist Clark."

Peter Marsh, writing for the BBC Music website, stated: "this is a fine record. Bristling with intelligence, good humour and swing, Moncur's music stands the test of time; something like 'Monk in Wonderland' should be a standard by now. Nice to see him back."

== Track listing ==
All tracks composed by Grachan Moncur III.

1. "Exploration" – 8:08
2. "Monk in Wonderland" – 5:23
3. "Love And Hate" – 8:45
4. "New Africa (Queen Tamam/New Africa/Black Call/Ethiopian Market)" – 9:52
5. "When?" – 7:32
6. "Frankenstein" – 6:57
7. "Excursion" – 2:53
8. "Sonny's Back!" – 4:13

== Personnel ==
- Grachan Moncur III – trombone
- Gary Bartz – alto saxophone
- Billy Harper – tenor saxophone
- Gary Smulyan – baritone saxophone
- Tim Hagans – trumpet
- Dave Woodley – trombone
- John Clark – French horn
- Ray Drummond – bass
- Andrew Cyrille - drums
