= The Tokyo Sessions =

Studio album by the Jazz Networks
- Released: January 1992
- Recorded: December 4 & 5, 1991
- Studio: Studio Sound Valley, Tokyo, Japan
- Genre: Jazz; post-bop
- Length: 53:16
- Label: Novus/RCA/BMG; 01241 63164 2 (US) / BVCJ-117 (Japan)
- Producer: Larry Clothier; Ikuyoshi Hirakawa

Roy Hargrove chronology
Public Eye (1991)	The Tokyo Sessions (1992)	The Vibe (1992)

The Tokyo Sessions, originally released in Japan as Straight to the Standards, is a studio album by the Jazz Networks, a group consisting of American musicians, trumpeter Roy Hargrove and saxophonist Antonio Hart, and Japanese musicians, pianist Yutaka Shiina, bassist Tomoyuki Shima, and drummer Masahiko Osaka. It was recorded on December 4 & 5, 1991, and released in January 1992, on the Novus/RCA/BMG labels.

In April 2021, the album was re-released by Sony Legacy for music streaming platforms as Straight to the Standards.

== Reception ==
Professional ratings
Review scores
Source	Rating
AllMusic	4/5 stars
The Rolling Stone Album Guide	3/5 stars

Ron Wynn of AllMusic commented: "Hargrove's fierce trumpet solos and Hart's bluesy, equally energetic and accomplished answering alto statements fueled nine excellent reworkings of standards and jazz repertory. [...] It would still be nice to hear Hart and Hargrove doing their own material rather than simply putting their spin on shopworn, though wonderful, anthems." The Rolling Stone Album Guide complimented the album, writing that "[it] takes a clean, crisp approach to a set of standards that run from a Chet Baker-inspired 'But Not for Me' to a no-frills 'Work Song.'"

== Track listing ==
No.	Title	Writer(s)	Length
1.	"Bohemia After Dark"	Oscar Pettiford	5:08
2.	"Love, Your Spell Is Everywhere"	Edmund Goulding; Elsie Janis	6:23
3.	"Work Song"	Nat Adderley; Oscar Brown Jr.	6:49
4.	"I Remember Clifford"	Benny Golson	7:05
5.	"Straight, No Chaser"	Thelonious Monk	4:51
6.	"But Not for Me"	George Gershwin; Ira Gershwin	6:09
7.	"Alone Together"	Arthur Schwartz; Howard Dietz	4:44
8.	"Lotus Blossom"	Kenny Dorham	5:32
9.	"Easy to Love"	Cole Porter	6:35
Total length:			53:16

== Personnel ==
Musicians

- Roy Hargrove – trumpet
- Antonio Hart – alto saxophone
- Yutaka Shiina – piano
- Tomoyuki Shima – bass
- Masahiko Osaka – drums

Technical

- Larry Clothier – producer
- Ikuyoshi Hirakawa – producer, series director
- Takahiro Nochimura – recording engineer
- Masataka Ito – assistant recording engineer
- Tohru Yamana – mastering
- Steve Backer – series director
- Mikio Kawasaki – art direction, design
- Jacqueline Murphy – art coordinator
- Hideo Canno – photography (cover)
