= Marc Cary =

American jazz pianist (born 1967)

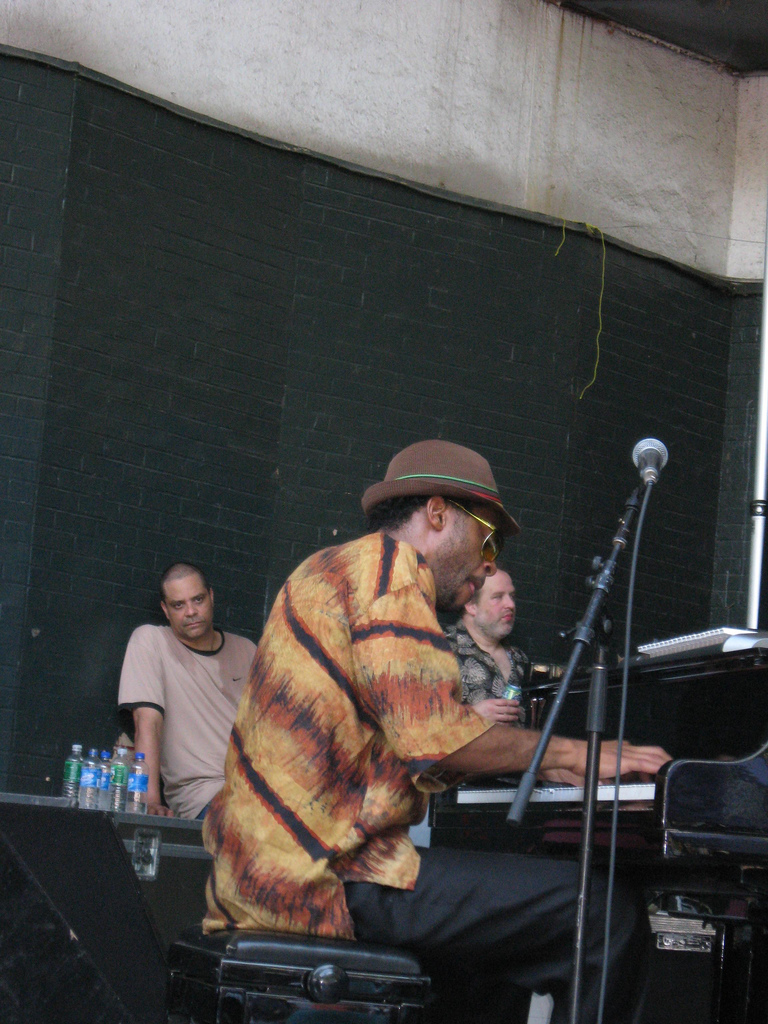
- Cary in 2007

Background information
- Born: Marc Anthony Cary; January 29, 1967 (age 59); New York City, U.S.
- Genre: Jazz
- Occupation: Musician
- Instrument: Piano
- Years active: 1990s–present
- Labels: Enja; Arabesque; Jazzateria; Motéma Music
- Website: www.marccary.com

Marc Cary (born January 29, 1967) is an American jazz pianist based in New York City. He has played and recorded with a number of well-known musicians, including Dizzy Gillespie, Betty Carter, Roy Hargrove, Arthur Taylor, Abbey Lincoln, Carlos Garnett, Erykah Badu, Meshell Ndegeocello, Stefon Harris, Lauryn Hill, Ani DiFranco, Jackie McLean, Q-Tip, and Carmen McRae.

== Life and career ==
Cary grew up playing on the go-go music scene in Washington, D.C. He eventually moved to New York City, and it was through his work with Abbey Lincoln that broad audiences were first introduced to his rhythmic style, which draws on the influence of Randy Weston and McCoy Tyner.

== Discography ==
=== As leader/co-leader ===
Year recorded	Title	Label	Notes
1995	Cary On	Enja	With Roy Hargrove (trumpet), Ron Blake (tenor saxophone), Dwayne Burno (bass), Dion Parson (drums), Yarborough Charles Laws (flute), Charlene Fitzpatrick (vocals)
1997	Listen	Arabesque	With Billy Johnson (bass), Dion Parson (drums), Yarbrough Charles Laws (flute), Daniel Moreno (percussion), Ron Blake (tenor saxophone), Terell Stafford (trumpet)
1998	The Anitdote	Arabesque	With Daniel Moreno, Yarbrough Charles Laws (percussion), Ron Blake (saxophone), John Ormond (bass)
1999?	Captured Live in Brazil	Jazzateria	with Indigenous People
1999	Rhodes Ahead	Jazzateria	
1999	Trillium	Jazzateria	With Nasheet Waits and Tarus Mateen
2003?	N.G.G.R. Please	Jazzateria	with Indigenous People
2006	FOCUS	Motéma Music	Trio, with Sameer Gupta and David Ewell
2006?	AbStraKt | BlaK	Motéma Music	
2012	For the Love of Abbey	Motéma Music	Solo piano
2013?	Four Directions	Motéma Music	Trio, with Burniss Earl Travis II, Rashaan Carter (bass; separately), Sameer Gupta (drums, tabla)
2015	Rhodes Ahead, Vol. 2	Motéma Music	
2018	After the Jam, Volume 1	Independent	Trio, with Dan Chmielinski (bass), Diego Ramirez (drums)

=== As sideman ===
With Abbey Lincoln

- Who Used to Dance (Verve / Gitanes Jazz, 1996 [1997])
- Wholly Earth (Verve / Gitanes Jazz, 1998 [1999])

With David Murray

- Be My Monster Love (Motéma, 2013)

With Roy Hargrove

- The Vibe (Novus/RCA, 1992)
- Of Kindred Souls (Novus/RCA, 1993)
- Approaching Standards (Novus/RCA/BMG, 1994) – compilation
- Hard Groove (Verve, 2003)
- The Love Suite: In Mahogany (Blue Engine, 2023)

With Art Taylor

- Mr. A.T. (Enja, 1992)

== Awards ==
- 2000: Best New Jazz Artist Award, Billboard/BET
- 2003: Native American Music Awards nomination
- 2014: "Rising Star: Keyboard", Downbeat
- One of Downbeat magazine's "25 for the future of Jazz!"
- Grammy Award nominations for work with Roy Hargrove, Betty Carter, Stefon Harris, and Abbey Lincoln
