= Yutaka Shiina =

Japanese jazz pianist and composer (born 1964)

- Born: Yutaka Shiina (椎名 豊, Shiina Yutaka); 23 September 1964 (age 61); Tokyo, Japan
- Genres: Jazz
- Occupations: Musician, composer
- Instrument: Piano
- Website: yutakashiina.com

Yutaka Shiina (椎名 豊, Shiina Yutaka; born 23 September 1964) is a Japanese jazz pianist and composer.

== Early life ==
Shiina was born in Tokyo on 23 September 1964. He had piano lessons from the age of three. From 1982 he studied composition at the Kunitachi College of Music; while still a student, he became a professional jazz pianist.

== Later life and career ==
Shiina joined the bands of Lionel Hampton and Vincent Herring for their 1989 tours of Japan. In the following year he became part of Roy Hargrove's quartet. Shiina was a founding member of the Jazz Networks, and led this band from 1992. He formed his own trio in 1994, initially with bassist Reginald Veal and drummer Masahiko Osaka. This band recorded, as did later versions that contained Veal and Herlin Riley, then Christian McBride and Clarence Penn.

In 1996 the pianist toured Japan with trumpeter Duško Gojković and Europe with drummer Elvin Jones' Jazz Machine. In 2007 Shiina co-led a tour of the UK with trumpeter Damon Brown. The two played together in the UK again, under the leadership of Brown and saxophonist Steve Grossman, in 2012.

== Playing style ==
John Fordham of The Guardian compared Shiina with pianist Wynton Kelly and commented that Shiina "keeps his virtuosity throttled back and maintains a hip expressiveness by letting insinuations, nuances and implied swing, and the subtle tick of the rhythm section do much of the work."

== Discography ==
An asterisk (*) after the year indicates that it is the year of release.

=== As leader/co-leader ===
Year recorded	Title	Label	Notes
1993	Movin' Forces	BMG	Trio, with Reginald Veal (bass), Masahiko Osaka (drums)
1995*	Hittin' the Spirit	BMG	Trio, with bass, drums
1996*	At the Moment	BMG	
1998	United	BMG	Trio, with Christian McBride (bass), Clarence Penn (drums)
2000*	Happy to Swing	BMG	
2009*	Walkin' in the Clouds	Space Shower Music	
2015	Future Swing	Scene-a Music	

=== As sideman ===
Year recorded	Leader	Title	Label
1991	The Jazz Networks	The Tokyo Sessions	Novus/RCA/BMG
1992	The Jazz Networks	Beauty and the Beast	BMG
	Tomonao Hara	For Musicians Only, Vol. 1	King
