= Brian Charette =

American musician (born 1972)

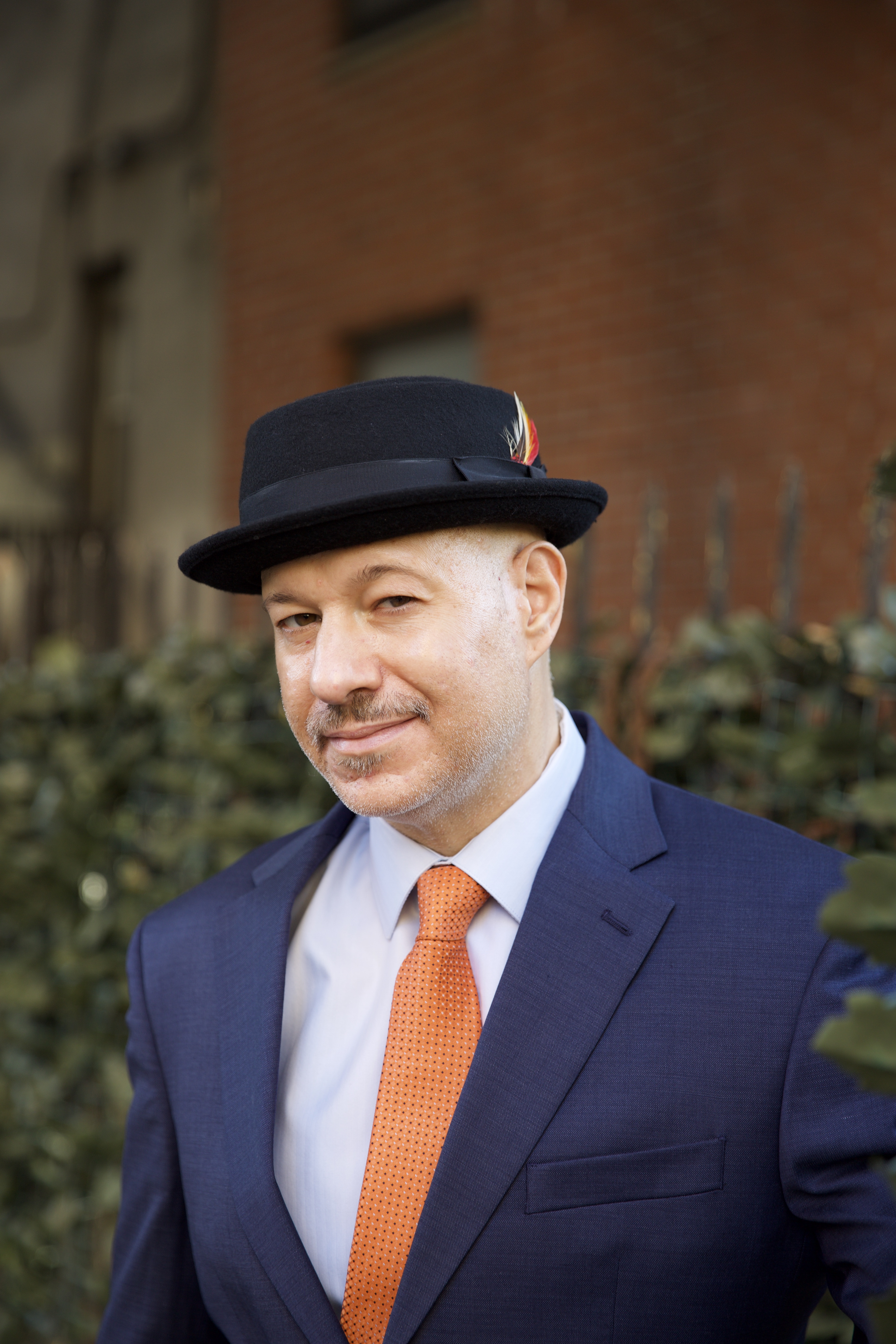

Background information
- Born: Brian Joseph Charette; November 24, 1972 (age 53); Meriden, Connecticut, U.S.
- Genres: Jazz
- Occupations: Musician, composer
- Instruments: Piano, Hammond organ, pipe organ, guitar, drums, flute, trumpet
- Website: www.briancharette.com

Brian Charette (born November 24, 1972) is an American jazz pianist, Hammond organist, and electronic music producer. He took first place in the 2014 "Downbeat Magazine Critic's Poll Rising Star: Organ" category and "Fan's Decision Jazz Award for Best Organist 2015" in Hot House Magazine. Charette has recorded and performed with music artists such as George Coleman, Oz Noy, Jaimoe, Michael McDonald, and Cyndi Lauper.

== Early life ==
Charette began learning about piano from his mother Catherine. He then studied piano for most of his childhood with George McKinstry. Charette attended Orville H. Platt High School where he began seriously studying music, piano, guitar, and trumpet. After high school, he attended Berklee College of Music for a three-week summer course where he studied with John LaPorta and Rick Peckham. While attending College at The University of Connecticut, Storrs, Charette studied piano with Ellen Rowe, Kenny Werner, Mark DeCozio, Mark Templeton, Charlie Banacos and Neal Larrabee. He graduated with a Bachelors in Fine Arts from UConn in 1994.

== Career ==
While still in high school, Charette started to perform at local clubs around Meriden and New Haven, Connecticut. At age 17, he started working regularly as a pianist with other area musicians such as Jimmy Greene, Paul Brown, and Jeff Pitchell. Charette was often employed as a pianist for established jazz artists like Lou Donaldson, Houston Person, Charles McPherson, Matt "Guitar" Murphy, and Gregg Bissonette. His first professional engagements were in Hartford, Connecticut where he became a member of Street Temperature, a jazz fusion group that played regularly at the 880 Club. After finishing high school, Charette toured Europe with Czech trumpeter, Laco Deczi and upon returning to the United States moved to New York City in 1994.

=== 1990s ===
Upon graduating from college Charette began working with brothers Jimmy Vivino and Jerry Vivino, backing up artists such as Cyndi Lauper, Michael McDonald, and Michael Bublé. Charette also appeared on television, performing on the Martha Stewart Show, Tony Danza Show, Conan O'Brien Show, Last Call with Carson Daly, and in a recurring role as a pianist on The Guiding Light. In 1999, he performed as a Hammond B3 organist in "Joni's Jazz", a concert in New York's Central Park featuring Joni Mitchell, Chaka Khan and Joe Jackson.

=== 2000s-present ===
Throughout the 2000s, Charette continued to record and play with many artists from all genres including David Hidalgo and Cougar Estrada of Los Lobos and singer Laura Branigan. Charette was signed to SteepleChase Records in 2008 and began touring often in Europe and Asia with his own groups and as a sideman.

In 2011, Charette began recording with the Los Angeles-based label, Posi-Tone Records, first as a sideman and in 2014 as a leader. In 2012, Charette became endorsed by Hammond USA. He continued to work with many groups including The Allman Brothers Band drummer Jaimoe in Jaimoe's Jasssz Band and with NEA Jazz Masters George Coleman.

Charette continued to perform and tour as both band leader and sideman. In a New York Times jazz review of his sextette Nate Chinen wrote, "The Hammond B-3 organist Brian Charette weighs the ageless objective of soul-jazz with a trace of restless modernity". Jazz critic Ken Micallef wrote in his Downbeat Magazine review of Once and Future, "Both B-3 stylist and student, serious jazz scholar and glitzy entertainer, Charette is a burning soloist who understands the tradition of the Hammond B-3 as well its future—just as certainty as he understands his place in that lineage". Charette also recorded and toured with guitarist Oz Noy and singer Morgan James.

In 2017, Charette began mixing Hammond organ with electronic music and released Kürrent on his own label, Dim Mak. In 2019, Charette became endorsed by IK Multimedia. His album of Hammond electronica, Like the Sun was released in December 2020 and a new SteepleChase recording, Power from the Air was issued in 2021.

Since 2011, Charette has been an active educator, lecturer and writer. He has written articles for Keyboard Magazine, Jazz Times, Downbeat, Electronic Musician, and The New York City Jazz Record. He has a book about Hammond organ published by Hal Leonard Corporation, "101 Hammond B3 Tips: Stuff all the Pros Know and Use" as well as a series of four instructional videos out with My Music Masterclass. Charette regularly gives music masterclasses all over the world including at the Czech Jazz Workshop in Prague, Czech Republic where he regularly teaches in the Summer.

== Awards and honors ==
- 1983 Dean's List, Liberal Arts & Science, University of Connecticut
- 2014 Downbeat, Critics Poll "Rising Star: Organ"
- 2015 Hot House, "Fan's Decision Jazz Award for Best Organist 2015"
- 2015–2020 Downbeat, Critics Poll Top 10 "Organist of the Year"
- 2021 Downbeat, Critic's Poll "#3 Organist of the Year"
- 2023 Downbeat, Critics Poll "#2 Organist of the Year"
- 2023 Downbeat, Critics Poll "Rising Star: Keyboards"
- 2025 Downbeat, Critics Poll "#15 Keyboardist of the Year"
- 2025 Downbeat, Critics Poll "#4 Organist of the Year"
- 2025 Downbeat, Editor's Pick, You Don't Know Jack!

== Personal life ==
Charette had partial hearing loss in his youth and needed ear tubes inserted in 1979 and 1981 which restored his hearing. From 1983 to 1985, Charette was a member of the gifted and talented program at Talcott Mountain Science Center in Avon, Connecticut, where he studied computer music and aeronautics. In 1990, he won the Hicks Essay Contest from Orville H. Platt High School. He has been a student of Chinese martial arts since 2004 and received a black sash in Fujian White Crane from Sifu Glenn Green in 2008. He has a bent pinky finger on his right hand from an accident that restricts his ability to use the finger in performance.

== Discography ==
=== As a leader ===
- Brian Charette (self release/Charette Music, 2000)
- Live at Deanna's (Soul Search, 2003)
- Digital Honesty (self release/Charette Music, 2004)
- Missing Floor (Dim Mak, 2008)
- Upside (SteepleChase, 2009)
- Learning to Count (SteepleChase, 2011)
- Music for Organ Sextette (SteepleChase, 2012)
- Borderline [solo organ] (SteepleChase, 2013)
- Soulmates (Newport-Line, 2013)
- The Question That Drives Us (SteepleChase, 2014)
- Square One (Posi-Tone, 2014)
- Good Tipper (Posi-Tone, 2014)
- Alphabet City (Posi-Tone, 2015)
- Once and Future (Posi-Tone, 2016)
- Kürrent (Dim Mak, 2017)
- Backup (SteepleChase, 2017)
- Groovin' with Big G (SteepleChase, 2018)
- Beyond Borderline [solo organ] (SteepleChase, 2019)
- New York Moments (SteepleChase, 2019)
- Like the Sun (Dim Mak, 2020)
- Power from the Air (SteepleChase, 2021)
- Jackpot (Cellar Music Group, 2023)
- You Don't Know Jack! (Cellar Music Group, 2024)
- Working Out with Big G (SteepleChase, 2025)
- Borderless [solo organ] (Steeplechase, 2025)
- Vancouver Jazz Orchestra Meets Brian Charette (Cellar Music Group, 2025)
