= Önder Focan =

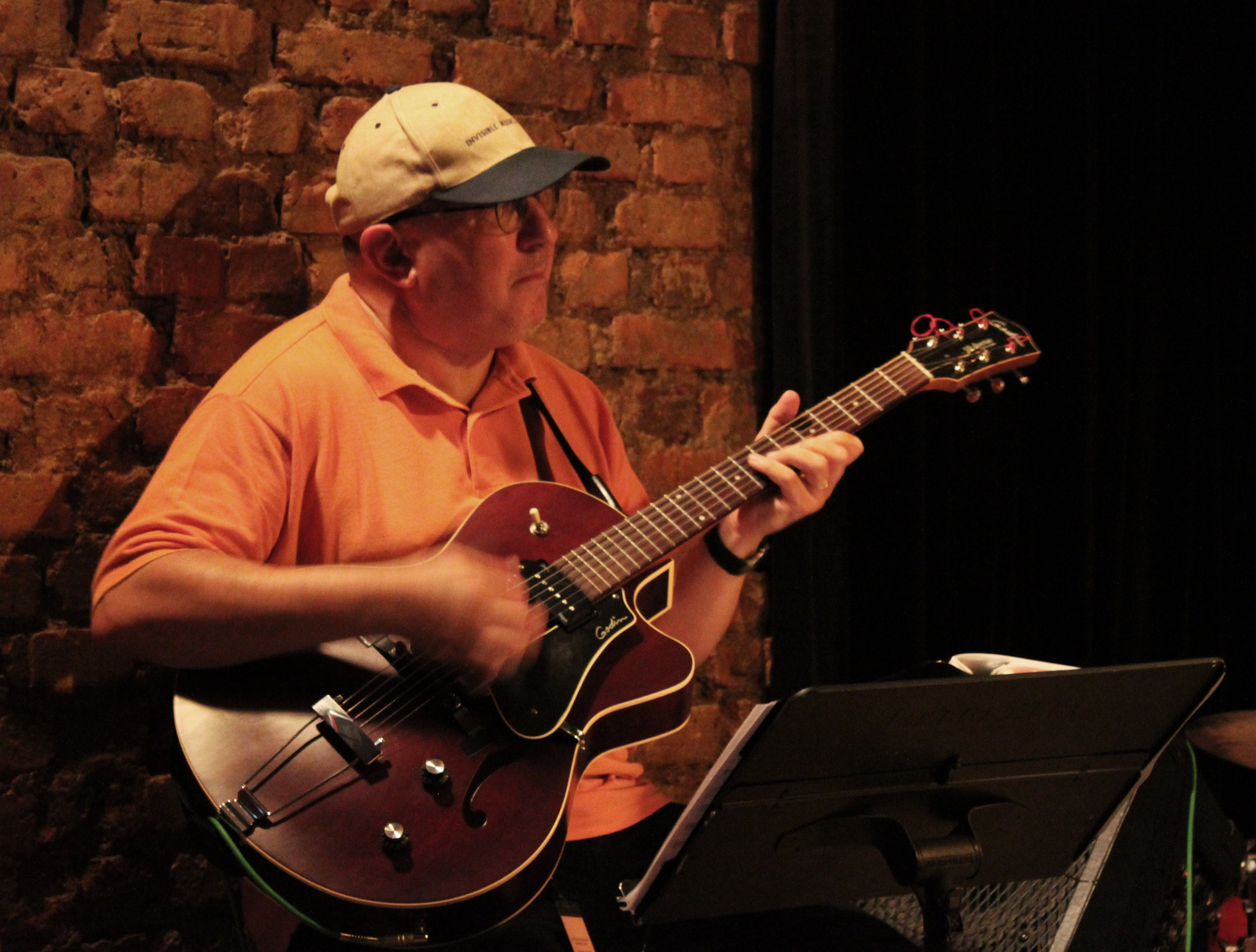
- Önder Focan in Nardis Jazz Club, 2011

Background information
- Birth name: Önder Focan
- Born: August 24, 1955 (age 70)
- Genres: Jazz
- Occupations: Musician; songwriter; composer; mechanical engineer
- Instrument: Guitar
- Years active: 1970–present
- Website: focanjazz.com

Önder Focan (born 1955/8/24), is a Turkish musician, songwriter, composer and mechanical engineer. He has 13 albums. He played at Jazz Festivals around the world.

== Early life ==
Focan started playing mandolin at the age of eight. At the age of 15 he switched to the guitar and has concentrated on jazz since 1975. The self-taught artist has released 13 albums under his own name since 1994. After attending seminars at the International Association of Jazz Educators, he led courses for jazz ensembles at the Istanbul Academy from 1996. Then he taught at the Müjdat Gezen Cultural Center and at the Yıldız Teknik Üniversitesi.

== Music career ==
In 1997 he performed with Jan Ackermann, Wolfgang Muthspiel, Terje Rypdal, Noël Akchoté, Harald Haerter and other guitarists at the MIDEM Guitar Night in Istanbul. In 1998 he was the first Turkish musician to record an album for Blue Note Records, Beneath the Stars with Bill Stewart and the organist Sam Yahel. In 2001 he was in the recording studio with David Friesen to record the album Reminiscence. In 2003 he recorded the album Spontaneous International Friends for Konnex Records with Ernst Bier and Stefan Weeke. Drummer Bier had already accompanied a Turkey tour with the Önder Focan Quartet in 1997. He also appeared with Ron McClure, Aaron Scott, Al Foster, Brian Lynch, Ted Curson and Anne Czichowsky. Focan has given concerts at festivals in North America, Europe, West Africa, Brazil and the Middle East.

With his wife Zuhal Focan, he founded the Nardis Jazz Club in Istanbul's Beyoğlu district in 2002. In addition to Turkish musicians, numerous international jazz stars such as Benny Golson, Dianne Reeves, Al Foster, Dee Dee Bridgewater, Roy Haynes and Ron Carter have performed there. The name "Nardis" refers to a composition by Miles Davis. The concept of the club is open to all varieties of jazz. The musician's wife, Zuhal Focan, is also editor-in-chief of the glossy magazine Jazz, which is published quarterly in Turkish and English.

== Discography ==
- Jazz Guitar (Diskotür, 1994) – live recorded in 1993
- Erken (Raks Müzik, 1995)
- Sekiz (Balet Plak, 1995)
- On The Bosphorus (Major Müzik Organizasyon, 1997)
- Beneath the Stars (Blue Note, 1998)
- Tunes Sung By The Vocalists (Blue Note, 1999)
- Trio Focan Standard A La Turc (EMI, 2001)
- REMinisce (EMI, 2003)
- Spontaneous International Jazz Friends, No. One (Konnex, 2003)
- Kırmızıya Çalıyor with Ercüment Vural (Aura, 2004)
- Swing A La Turc (2007)
- 36mm Biometric (2009)
- Songbook (2012)
- Aubergine (2022)
