= Jeff Pitchell =

American musician (born 1966)

- Born: April 11, 1966 (age 60); Hartford, Connecticut, U.S.
- Genres: Blues rock; blues; rock; roots rock; hard rock
- Occupations: Musician, songwriter
- Instruments: Guitar, vocals
- Years active: 1981–present
- Labels: Premier; EMI; Peach Records/Munck Music
- Website: www.jeffpitchell.com

Jeff Pitchell (born April 11, 1966 in Hartford, Connecticut, United States) is an American singer, songwriter, guitarist, recording artist, instructor, and actor who is inducted into the Connecticut Blues Hall of Fame. He leads the band Jeff Pitchell and Texas Flood performing original and classic rock selections. Based in Rocky Hill, Connecticut, Pitchell has performed throughout the United States as well as internationally.

== Life and career ==
Pitchell earned early recognition for his guitar prowess at the age of 15 by winning the Best Guitarist in State of Connecticut contest held at the University of Hartford. He graduated from the Watkinson School in Hartford, Connecticut in 1984.

He has since won numerous additional awards for music performance and recording. Pitchell set aside a teaching career to pursue his true passion: playing the guitar and entertaining people. Pitchell and Texas Flood recently won recognition as the Best Blues Band Show in New England.

== Performances ==
Pitchell in 2014 performed Southbound with the Allman Brothers Band at the Beacon Theatre in New York City. This performance was recorded and released on Peach Records/Munck Music in March 2014. He has also performed and/or recorded with Phil Lesh, Rick Derringer, Bo Diddley, B.B. King, Buddy Guy, Ted Nugent, Clarence Clemons, Dave Mason, James Cotton, Fabulous Thunderbirds, NRBQ, John Mayall, Jimmie Vaughan, Kenny Wayne Shepherd, Peter Tork, Dickey Betts, and The Commitments. Pitchell has appeared on national TV and radio, including for the World Champion Boston Red Sox at Fenway Park, and for Don Imus on his radio and TV show on MSNBC.

== Associations ==
Pitchell has collaborated with many internationally recognized performers; Michael Allman (Gregg Allman’s son), Claudette King (B.B. King's daughter), Sheila Raye (Ray Charles daughter, James Montgomery, J. Geils, Charles Neville, and Carla Cooke (Sam Cooke's daughter).

== Awards and recognition ==
He was inducted into Connecticut Blues Hall of Fame in 2018. Heavy Hitter was listed on the national Billboard Top Blues Album Chart at No. 7, where the majority of the songs on the album were written by Pitchell. He won the "Best Guitarist" in the State of Connecticut at age 15. He has won numerous awards since, including two songwriting awards from the Great American Songwriting Contest. The International Songwriting Contest (ISC) judge and blues musician, John Mayall, subsequently recorded Pitchell's song "An Eye for an Eye" on one of his albums, Tough. Pitchell and his band, Texas Flood, won the Best Blues Act in New England in a six-state vote.

== Discography ==
- Fat Cigars (1997, Premier)
- One Day Away (1999, Premier)
- Face To Face (2001, Premier)
- Heavy Hitter (2002, Pyramid/EMI)
- One for the Fans (2006, Premier)
- Rockin' Songs for Kids (2010, Premier)
- American Girl (2010, Vizztone)
- Allman Brothers Band (Peach/Munck Music)
- Playin' With My Friends (2023, Deguello)
