= Diamond in the Rough (Roy Hargrove album) =

1990 studio album by Roy Hargrove

Studio album by Roy Hargrove
- Released: April 13, 1990
- Recorded: December 1989
- Studios: Studio A, BMG Recording Studios, New York City; BMG Studios, January 1990 (mixing)
- Genres: Jazz; hard bop
- Length: 63:04
- Labels: Novus/RCA; PD90471
- Producer: Larry Clothier

Roy Hargrove chronology
Diamond in the Rough (1990)	Public Eye (1991)

Diamond in the Rough is the first studio album by trumpeter Roy Hargrove, his debut as leader; it was recorded in December 1989 and released on April 13, 1990, on the Novus/RCA label. The album features close musical compatriots of Hargrove: saxophonists Antonio Hart and Ralph Moore, pianists Geoffrey Keezer and John Hicks, bassists Charles Fambrough and Scott Colley, and drummers Al Foster and Ralph Peterson Jr.

== Reception ==
Professional ratings
Review scores
Source	Rating
AllMusic	4/5 stars
The Rolling Stone Album Guide	3/5 stars

Scott Yanow, writing for AllMusic, was positive of the album, stating: "Trumpeter Roy Hargrove's debut as a leader found him occasionally recalling Freddie Hubbard but already sounding fairly original in the hard bop genre. [...] Hargrove shows restraint and maturity in his lyrical ballad statement while featuring his strong bop chops on most of the other selections. "However, he continued that "The one fault with the CD is that the performances and solos are often a little too brief". The Rolling Stone Album Guide wrote of the album: "[it] offers outstanding playing and clean technique and tone; the compositions by Hargrove and Keezer stand up surprisingly well in the company of Thelonious Monk, Benny Golson, and Rodgers and Hammerstein [sic]." Gary Giddins, for Entertainment Weekly, commented: "Hargrove's eagerly awaited debut album, though flawed, is an event. It's a shade overproduced—restrained performances, short solos—but his talent is unmistakable. [...] Throughout a program that includes jazz classics, fetching originals, and a signature Bing Crosby Ballad ('Easy to Remember'), he demonstrates a natural musicality, warm timbre, savvy dynamics, and surprising composure."

== Track listing ==
All tracks are written by Roy Hargrove except where noted.

No.	Title	Writer(s)	Length
1.	"Proclamation"	Geoffrey Keezer	6:12
2.	"Ruby My Dear"	Thelonious Monk	6:13
3.	"A New Joy"		6:01
4.	"Confidentiality"		4:58
5.	"Broski"	Charles Fambrough	4:12
6.	"Whisper Not"	Benny Golson	7:40
7.	"All Over Again"		5:47
8.	"Easy to Remember"	Richard Rodgers; Lorenz Hart	6:10
9.	"Premonition"	Keezer	5:37
10.	"BHG"	Keezer	6:05
11.	"Wee" (a.k.a. "Allen's Alley")	Denzil Best	4:09
Total length:			63:04

== Personnel ==
Musicians

- Roy Hargrove – trumpet
- Antonio Hart – alto saxophone
- Ralph Moore – tenor saxophone (1, 5, 7, 9, 10)
- Geoffrey Keezer (1, 5, 7, 9, 10), John Hicks (2–4, 6, 8, 11) – piano
- Charles Fambrough (1, 5, 7, 9, 10), Scott Colley (2–4, 6, 8, 11) – double bass
- Al Foster (2–4, 6, 8, 11), Ralph Peterson Jr. (1, 5, 7, 9, 10) – drums

Technical

- Larry Clothier – production
- James Nichols – recording engineer
- Jack Adelman – mastering
- Steve Backer – series director
- Ria Lewerke – art direction, design
- Steve Prezant – photography
