= Public Eye (album) =

1991 studio album by Roy Hargrove

Studio album by Roy Hargrove
- Released: March 25, 1991
- Recorded: October 1990
- Studio: Clinton Recording Studios, NYC (recording and mixing)
- Genre: Jazz; hard bop
- Length: 67:03
- Label: Novus/RCA; PD83113
- Producer: Larry Clothier

Roy Hargrove chronology
Diamond in the Rough (1990)	Public Eye (1991)	The Tokyo Sessions (1992)

Public Eye is the sophomore studio album by trumpeter Roy Hargrove, recorded in October 1990 and released on March 25, 1991, on the Novus/RCA label. For this date, Hargrove is joined by saxophonist Antonio Hart, pianist Stephen Scott, bassist Christian McBride, and drummer Billy Higgins.

== Reception ==
Professional ratings
Review scores
Source	Rating
AllMusic	4/5 stars
The Rolling Stone Album Guide	3/5 stars

Scott Yanow, writing for AllMusic, stated: "Hargrove shows why he was so highly rated from the start of his career. On such numbers as 'September in the Rain,' 'End of a Love Affair,' 'Crazeology,' and four of his straight-ahead originals, Hargrove plays in a style not that different from Lee Morgan but with his own soulful sound, revitalizing the jazz tradition with his enthusiastic ideas." The Rolling Stone Album Guide emphasized that the album "mix[es] such well-known tunes as 'September in the Rain,' 'What's New' and a storming, high-speed 'Crazeology' with high-powered originals like the title track and 'Lada'", continuing that "The byplay of Hargrove and Hart provides the kind of exchange usually associated with seasoned veterans." Jack Fuller for the Chicago Tribune noted: "the young trumpeter Roy Hargrove does an undistinguished but perfectly adequate job with a set of standards and originals. The tone is as buttery as Clifford Brown's but the sense of uniqueness isn't there yet." Similarly, a brief by Jazz in Marciac concluded that the album "reveals a soloist who, in some ways, recalls Clifford Brown". Spin magazine added that "This second Novus release displays Roy's maturation as a bandleader and brilliantly showcases 22-year-old Antonio Hart."

== Track listing ==
All tracks are written by Roy Hargrove except where noted.

No.	Title	Writer(s)	Length
1.	"Public Eye"		6:51
2.	"Spiritual Companion"		6:18
3.	"September in the Rain"	Harry Warren; Al Dubin	7:30
4.	"Lada"		4:44
5.	"Once in Awhile"	Michael Edwards; Bud Green	5:35
6.	"Hartbreaker"		5:06
7.	"End of a Love Affair"	Edward C. Redding	7:58
8.	"Night Watch"	Kenny Dorham	6:11
9.	"You Don't Know What Love Is"	Gene de Paul; Don Raye	6:22
10.	"Little Bennie (Crazeology)"	Benny Harris	5:13
11.	"What's New"	Bob Haggart; Johnny Burke	5:15
Total length:			67:03

== Personnel ==
Musicians

- Roy Hargrove – trumpet
- Antonio Hart – alto saxophone
- Stephen Scott – piano
- Christian McBride – double bass
- Billy Higgins – drums

Technical

- Larry Clothier – producer, mixing
- Ed Rak – recording engineer, mastering, mixing
- Derrick Garrett – assistant recording engineer
- Ted Jensen – mastering
- Gene Curtis – digital editing
- Steve Backer – series director
- Tom Piazza – liner notes
- Ria Lewerke – art direction
- Jacqueline Murphy – design
- Brian Davis – photography
