= Gregory Hutchinson (musician) =

American jazz drummer

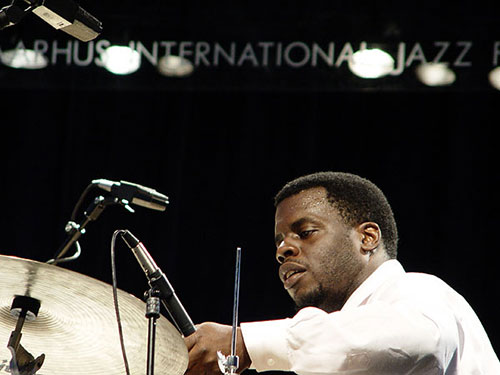
Hutchinson in 2009

Gregory Hutchinson (born June 16, 1970) is an American jazz drummer.

== Biography ==
Hutchinson's father was a drummer in a reggae band he led called the Triadics, and he played with his father while growing up. He studied under Marvin "Smitty" Smith and Kenny Washington in the late 1980s, and began his career playing with Red Rodney in 1989–1990.

In the 1990s, he worked with Betty Carter, Roy Hargrove, Stephen Scott, Ray Brown, Eric Reed, Joe Henderson, Marcus Printup, Antonio Hart, Joshua Redman, Greg Gisbert, Frank Wess, Steve Wilson, Andy LaVerne, Johnny Griffin, LaVerne Butler, Peter Bernstein, Claire Martin, Ben Wolfe, Jeremy Davenport, Mark Whitfield, Teodross Avery, Jimmy Smith, Kristin Korb, Arturo Sandoval, John Patitucci, Joey Calderrazo, Michael Brecker, and Rodney Whitaker.

He is also an artist at Open Studio Jazz.

In April 2026 he released an album under his own name at Warner Music Arts: Kind of Now: The Pulse of Miles Davis. His sidemen have been Ambrose Akinmusire, Gerald Clayton, Emmanuel Michael, Jakob Bro, Joe Sanders
