= Antonio Hart =

American jazz saxophonist (born 1968)

- Born: September 30, 1968 (age 57); Baltimore, Maryland, U.S.
- Genres: Jazz
- Occupation: Musician
- Instrument: Saxophone
- Website: AntonioHart.com

Antonio Hart (born September 30, 1968) is an American jazz alto saxophonist. He attended the Baltimore School for the Arts, studied with Andy McGhee at Berklee College of Music, and has a master's degree from Queens College, City University of New York. His initial training was classical, but he switched to jazz in college. He gained recognition for his work with Roy Hargrove.

Hart is currently serving as a full-time professor of jazz studies in Aaron Copland School of Music at Queens College City University of New York.

Hart is a member of the Sigma chapter of Alpha Phi Alpha fraternity

== Discography ==
=== As leader ===
- 1991: For the First Time (Novus)
- 1992: Tokyo Sessions with Roy Hargrove (Novus)
- 1992: Don't You Know I Care with Gary Bartz (Novus)
- 1993: For Cannonball and Woody (Novus)
- 1995: It's All Good (Novus)
- 1996: Alto Summit (Milestone) with Phil Woods, Vincent Herring, Reuben Rogers
- 1997: Here I Stand (Impulse!/GRP)
- 2001: Ama Tu Sonrisa (Enja)
- 2004: All We Need (Downtown Sound)
- 2015: Blessings (Jazz Legacy)

=== As sideman ===
With Rabih Abou-Khalil

- The Cactus of Knowledge (Enja, 2001) – recorded in 2000

With Dee Dee Bridgewater

- This Is New (Verve, 2002) – recorded in 2001

With Terence Blanchard

- Simply Stated (Columbia, 1992)

With Robin Eubanks

- Mental Images (JMT, 1994)

Wake Up Call, 1997, Scirocco

With Dizzy Gillespie

- Bird Songs: The Final Recordings (Telarc, 1992)
- To Bird with Love (Telarc, 1992)

With Roy Hargrove

- Diamond in the Rough (Novus/RCA, 1990)
- Public Eye (Novus/RCA, 1991)
- The Tokyo Sessions (Novus/RCA/BMG, 1992)
- The Vibe (Novus, 1992)

With Dave Holland

- What Goes Around (ECM, 2002) – recorded in 2001
- Pass It On (Dare2/Emarcy, 2008) – recorded in 2007
- Pathways (Dare2, 2010) – recorded in 2009

With Wallace Roney

- Crunchin' (Muse, 1993)

With Cecil Brooks III

- Smokin' Jazz (Muse, 1993)

With McCoy Tyner

- Prelude and Sonata (1995)

With Gerald Wilson

- Monterey Moods (Mack Avenue, 2007)
- Detroit (Mack Avenue, 2009)
- Legacy (Mack Avenue, 2011)
