= Music of New York City =

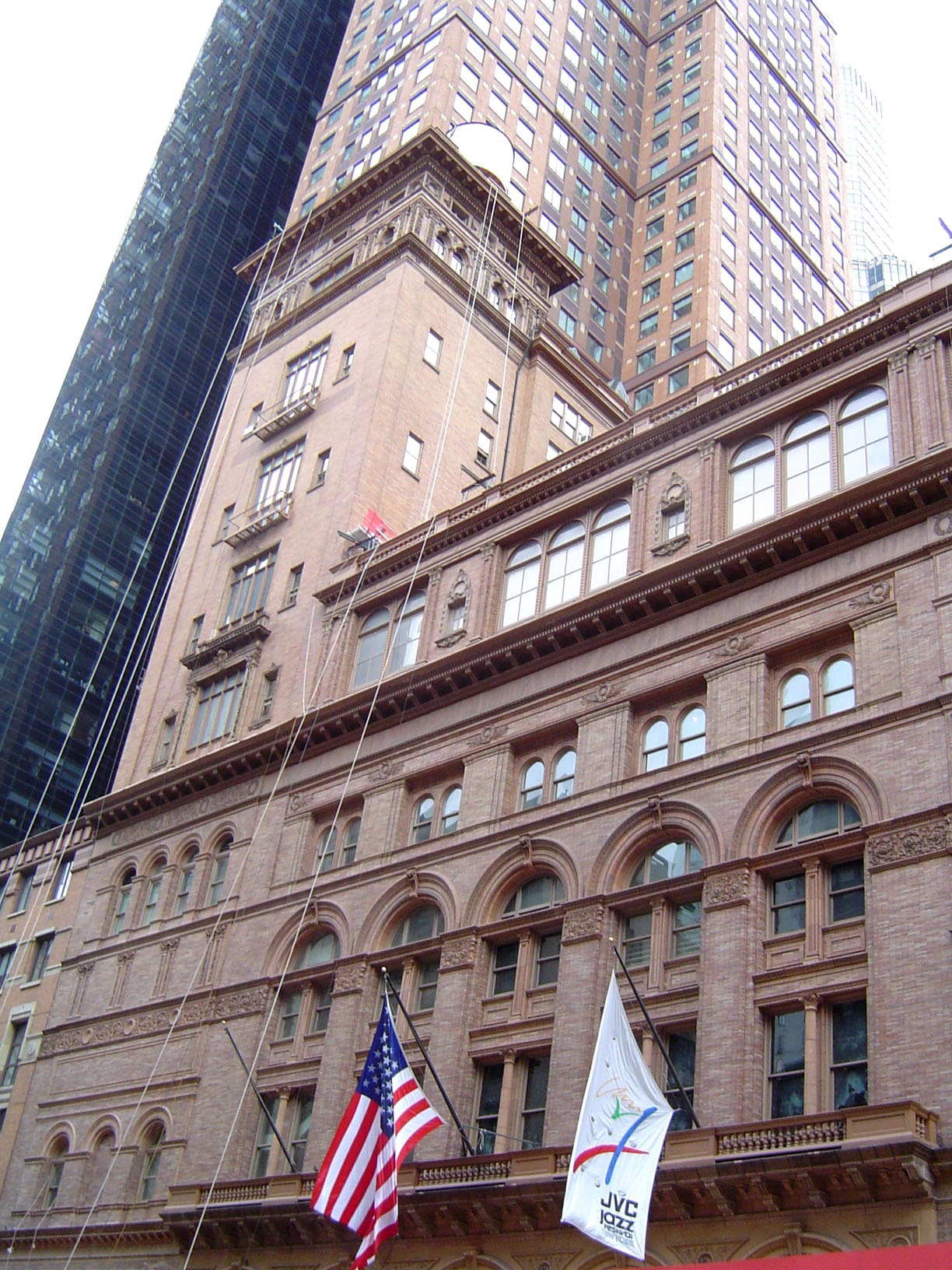
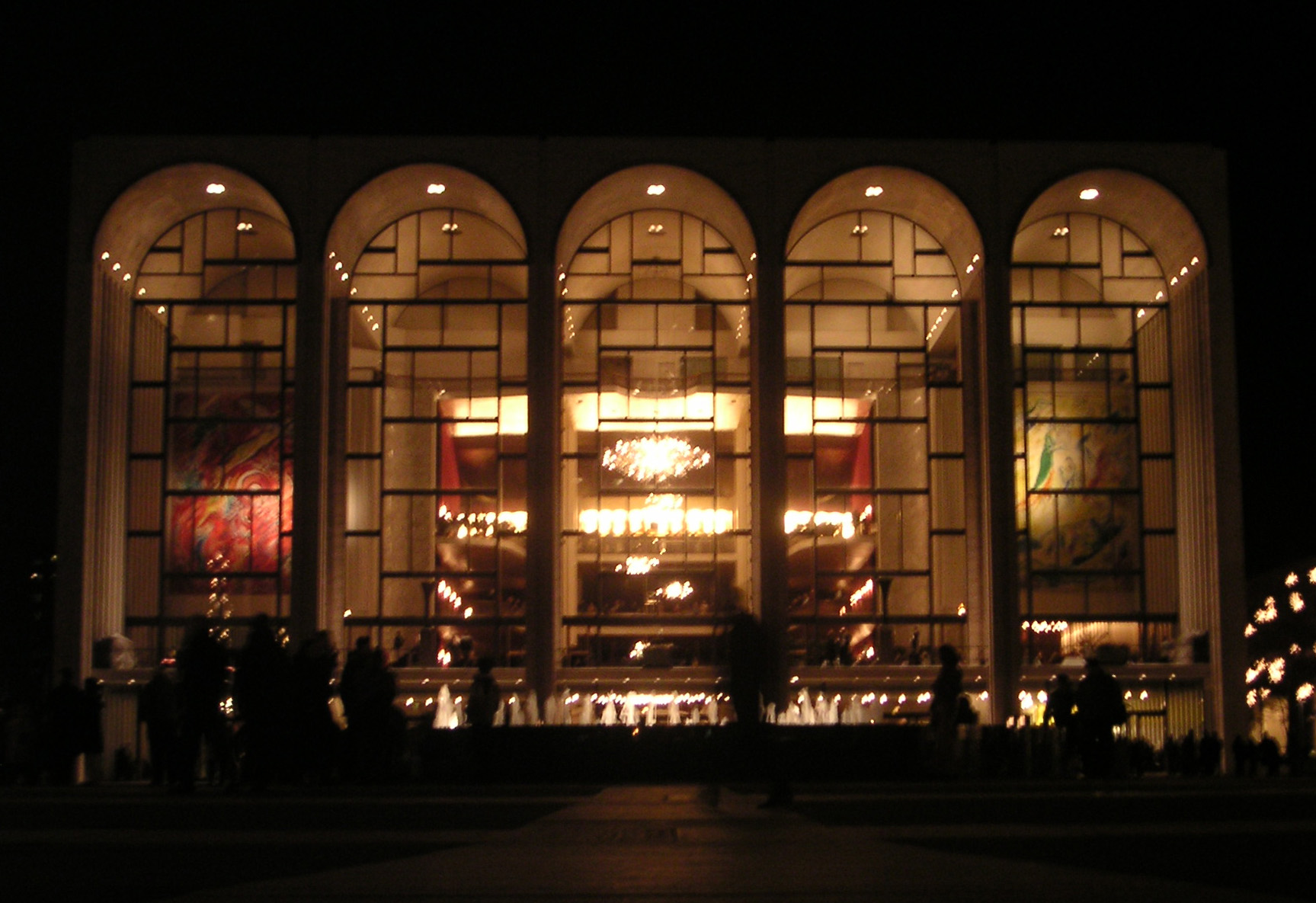
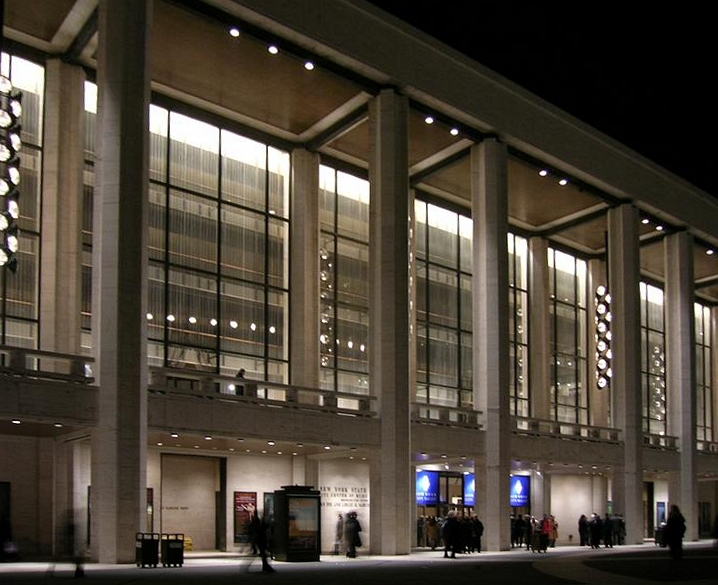
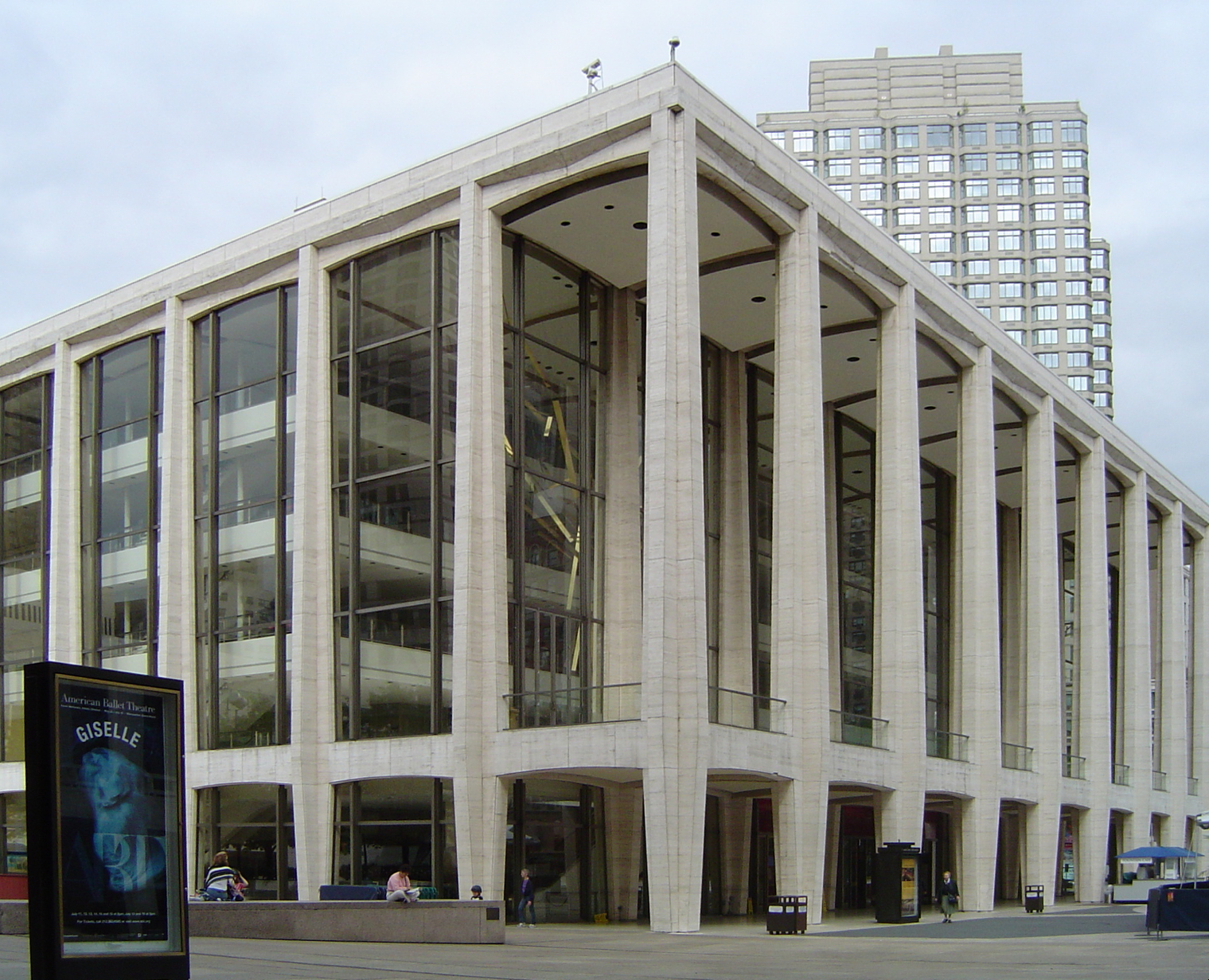
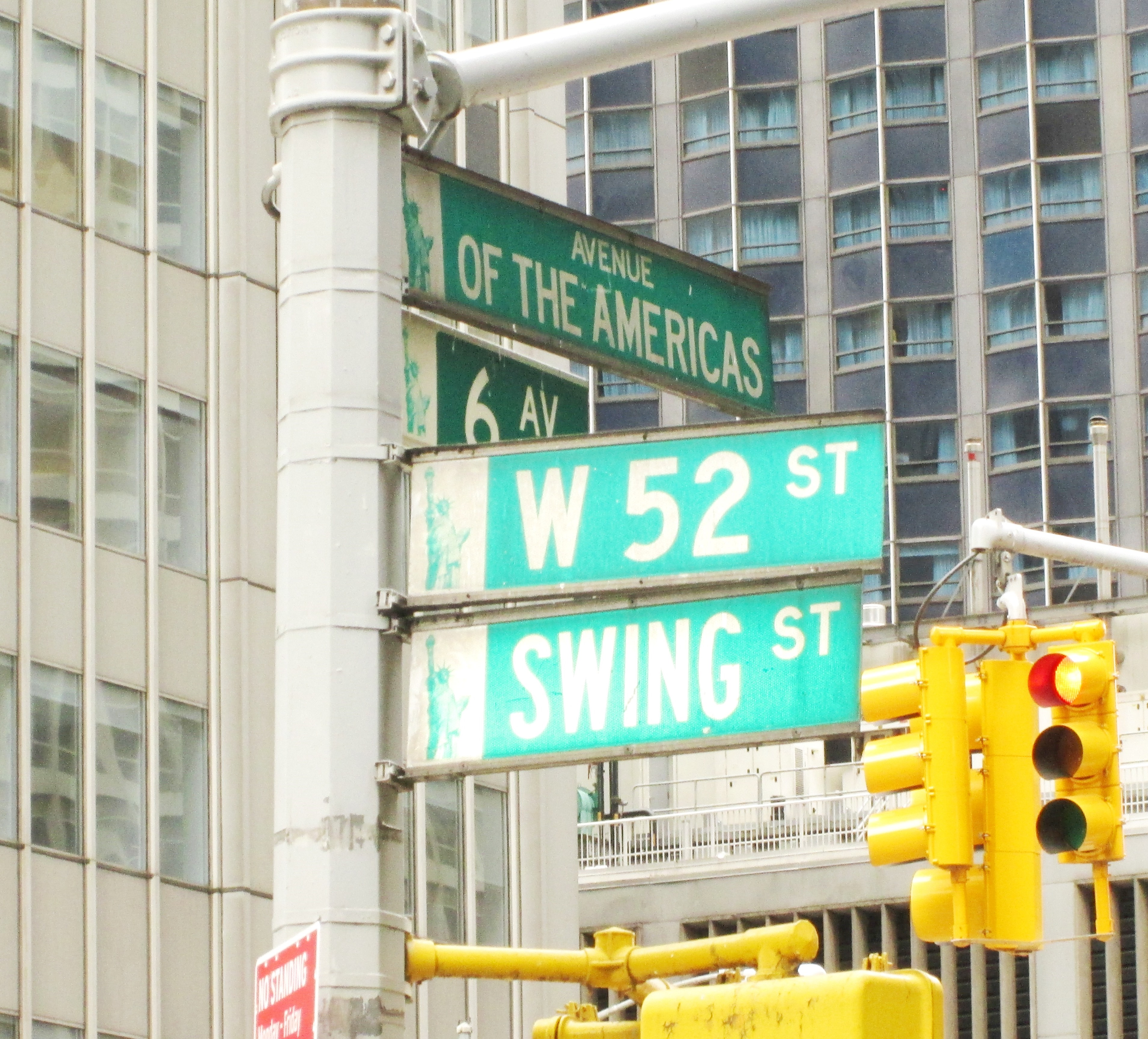
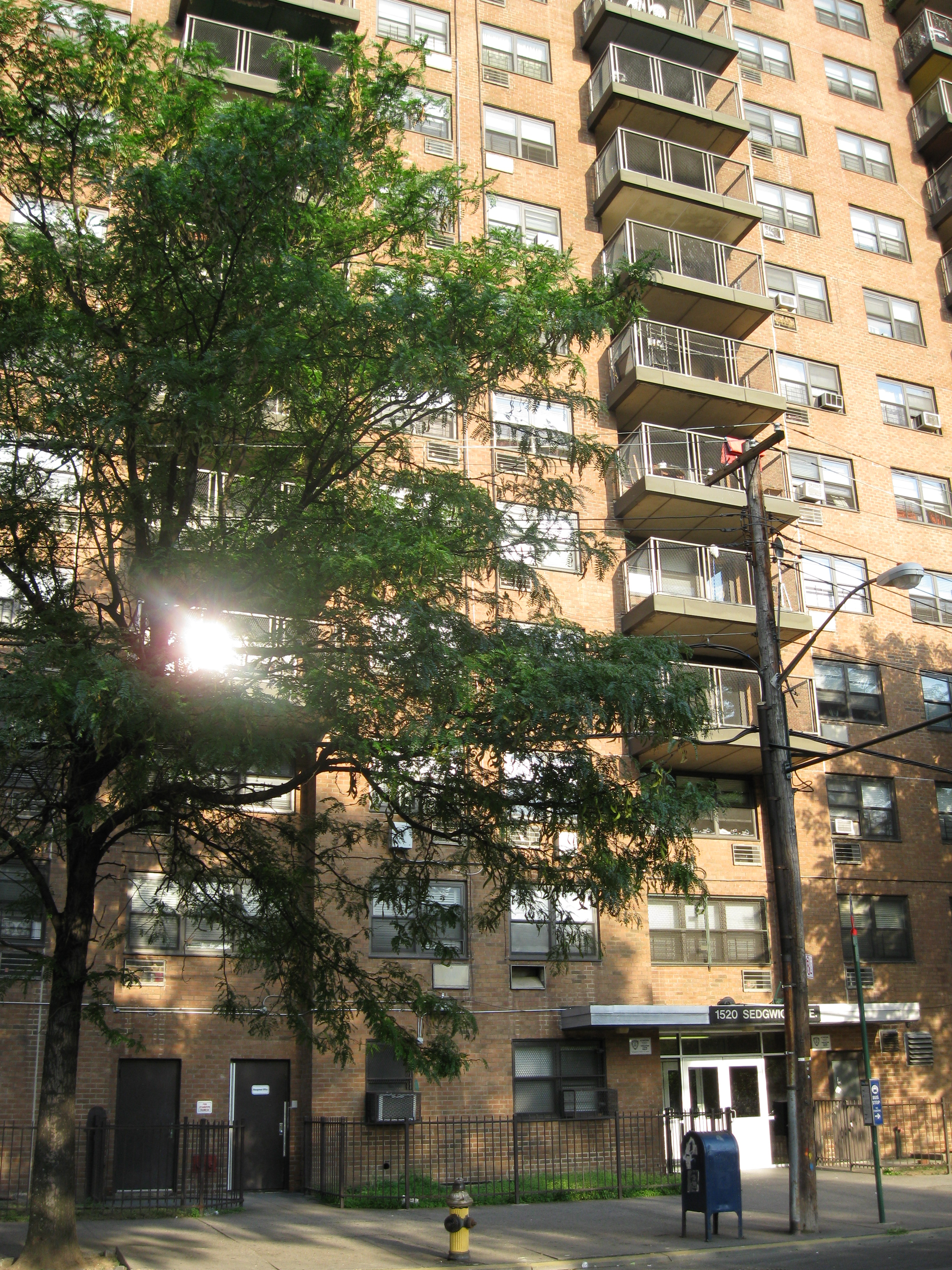
Clockwise from top left: Carnegie Hall; The Metropolitan Opera House; Avery Fisher Hall; 1520 Sedgwick Avenue in the Bronx; West 52nd Street, or "Swing" Street, in Midtown Manhattan; The New York State Theater

The music of New York City is a diverse and important field in the world of music. It has long been a thriving home for popular genres such as jazz, rock, soul music, R&B, funk, and the urban blues, as well as classical and art music. It is the birthplace of hip-hop, garage house, boogaloo, doo-wop, bebop, punk rock, disco, and new wave. It is also the birthplace of salsa music, born from a fusion of Cuban and Puerto Rican influences that came together in New York's Latino neighborhoods in the 1940s and 1950s. The city's culture, a melting pot of nations from around the world, has produced vital folk music scenes such as Irish-American music and Jewish klezmer. Beginning with the rise of popular sheet music in the early 20th century, New York's Broadway musical theater, and Tin Pan Alley's songcraft, New York has been a major part of the American music industry.

Music author Richie Unterberger has described the New York music scene, and the city itself, as "(i)mmense, richly diverse, flashy, polyethnic, and engaged in a never-ending race for artistic and cosmopolitan supremacy." Despite the city's historic importance in the development of American music, its status has declined in recent years due to a combination of increased corporate control over music media, an increase in the cost of living, and the rise of local music scenes whose success is facilitated by the cheap communication provided by the Internet.

== Institutions and venues ==
New York has been a center for the American music industry since the earliest records in the early 20th century. Since then, a number of companies and organizations have set up headquarters in New York, from the Tin Pan Alley publishers and Broadway to modern independent rock and hip-hop labels, non-profit organizations, and others. Many music magazines are or were headquartered in New York, including Blender, Punk, Spin, and Rolling Stone.

Carnegie Hall is one of the most important music venues in the world, especially for classical music; the hall is noted for its excellent acoustics. The venue was named for philanthropist Andrew Carnegie, but fell into disrepair in the 20th century until being renovated between 1983 and 1995. Radio City Music Hall was also a major venue after opening in 1932, and was also recently renovated; it is now a significant architectural attraction as an example of the Art Deco style.

Lincoln Center for the Performing Arts is the largest performing arts center in the world. The center is home to twelve resident organizations, including the Metropolitan Opera, New York Philharmonic, New York City Ballet, Chamber Music Society, New York City Opera, Juilliard School, Lincoln Center Theater, and Jazz at Lincoln Center. The New York Philharmonic, which performs at Avery Fisher Hall, is the oldest orchestra in the United States, founded in 1842. As of 2005, Lorin Maazel is the conductor. The Philharmonic has made more than 500 recordings since 1917, and was one of the first to broadcast live performances, beginning in 1922. The New York Philharmonic produced celebrated composers such as George Bristow and Theodore Thomas. Bristow was a fiercely nationalistic composer who left the Philharmonic because he felt it did not glorify American music adequately, a situation he, and later Thomas, attempted to rectify.

Other institutions and organizations in New York include the Brooklyn Academy of Music, New York City Ballet, the Jazz Foundation of America and the Louis Armstrong House. Notable venues that have closed include the Aeolian Hall of Rhapsody in Blue fame and the old Metropolitan Opera (demolished in 1967) at 1411 Broadway. The Apollo Theater has long been a place for African American performers to begin their careers; it has such an iconic status that Congress has declared it a National Historic Landmark.

=== Club influence ===
The New York club scene is an important part of the city's music scene, the birthplace of many styles of music from disco to punk rock; some of these clubs, such as Studio 54, Max's Kansas City, Mercer Arts Center, ABC No Rio, and CBGB, reached iconic statuses in the United States and the world. New York is home to several major jazz clubs, including Birdland, Sweet Rhythm (formerly Sweet Basil), the Village Vanguard, and the Blue Note, the latter being one of the premier spots for jazz lovers. There was a time—now long gone—when 52nd Street in Manhattan, with its numerous clubs, was one of the epicenters of jazz. Future generations of music venues would retain the prolific elements of this culture. Since transmogrifying the local dance scene (deep house) to form "acid-jazz" in the late 1980s, Groove Academy/Giant Step has launched several major-label bands such as Groove Collective and Nuyorican Soul.

The Greenwich Village folk scene is home to venues such as the long-standing landmark The Bottom Line. New York's rock scene includes clubs such as Irving Plaza, while the city's avant-garde "downtown" scene includes The Kitchen, Roulette, and Knitting Factory. The Latin and world music scene features venues such as S.O.B.'s and the Wetlands Preserve, which closed in 2001.

== Festivals, holidays and parades ==
New York has a long history of using music in various festivals and parades, though the vibrant local music scene has meant that festivals are less of a draw than in other cities, since residents are near major sources of live music all the time. The diverse groups of immigrants living in New York have each brought with them their own holiday traditions. As a result, major festivals of music in New York include the Chinese New Year celebrations, Pulaski Day Parade, and the St. Patrick's Day Parade run by the Ancient Order of Hibernians. New York is home to the largest St. Patrick's Day parade in the world, a tradition that has continued since 1762 due to the large Irish population in New York. Irish folk music and folk-rock are the major styles at the two-day Guinness Fleadh festival. The College Music Journal Network's annual Music Marathon has been held since 1980, providing a major showcase for new music. Central Park SummerStage, a series of free concerts presented by City Parks Foundation and hosting performers of many kinds, is also a major part of New York's summer music scene, which also includes the July Intel New York Music Festival. There are numerous New York jazz festivals, including the Texaco New York Jazz Festival, Panasonic Village Jazz Festival, the JVC Jazz Festival, and the free Charlie Parker Jazz Festival. The City Parks Foundation also presents a series of thirty free concerts in ten parks across all five boroughs of the city each summer. Roz Nixon founded Great Women in Jazz in 2001. It is a month-long festival in October in New York.

Additionally, New York hosted the yearly Electric Zoo festival, which was second only to Miami's Winter Music Conference as a mecca for house and electronic music fans in the United States. It also holds the annual Dance Parade which brings together all types of dance-oriented music from across the world (both traditional and contemporary) in a combined parade down Fifth Avenue. The NYC Musical Saw Festival has been a summer staple since 2001, bringing musical saw players from around the world to perform diverse types of music on this unique instrument. The festival, organized by Natalia Paruz, holds the Guinness World Record for the largest musical saw ensemble.

== Music history ==
The first music performed in the area that is now New York City was that of the Lenape Native Americans who lived there. However, little is known of these peoples' musical lives. The earliest documented music comes after the foundation of the city (then called New Amsterdam) by Dutch explorers, who controlled the area until the British conquest in 1664. The music of New York's colonial era was primarily British in character, gradually evolving as the United States became independent and developed a distinct culture; the influence of African-American music became very important as the city's African American population increased throughout the 18th and 19th centuries.

By the 1830s, New York was gradually becoming the most important cultural center in the United States, and was a home for many varieties of folk, popular and classical music. Late in the 19th century, many influential conservatories and venues were founded, including the world-famous Metropolitan Opera House and Carnegie Hall. New York's status as a center for musical development continued into the 20th century, leading to the foundation of many companies associated with the American music industry in the city. These companies included sheet music publishers, based around an area called Tin Pan Alley, and later record labels and other organizations and institutions. The rise of the Broadway theatres began in the early part of the century; the songs from Broadways musicals became some of the earliest American popular music, and eventually came to be treated as pop standards.

NYC is famous for its subway musicians. The Music Under New York program started as a pilot project in 1985 and was officially established as a full program under MTA Arts & Design in January 1987. The launch of the program followed a 1985 court challenge that declared the previous city-wide ban on subway performances unconstitutional. Acclaimed musicians who play in the NYC subway regularly are Natalia Paruz (also known as the "Saw Lady"' for playing the musical saw), Afrikumba Utibe Drummers, Anthony Carrera sitar and handpan, and G Wyll (guitarist and vocalist).

=== Early history ===
As the Dutch colony of New Amsterdam, New York was populated by Dutch settlers who left little musical trace behind, excepting some songs such as "Dutch Prayer of Thanksgiving," "Rosa," and "The Little Dustman." Under English rule, sea shanties, open-air singing gardens, sometimes with fireworks, ballads and other Anglo-Irish traditions, became widespread. New York's colonial ballads were often topical, concerning the events of the day and the local gossip. Beginning in 1732, ballads were placed together with a story tying them together, forming a performance genre called the ballad opera, the best-known of which is The Beggar's Opera, first performed in 1752. That same period also saw the first concerts held in New York, and the arrival of William Tuckey, who helped establish church music in the city.

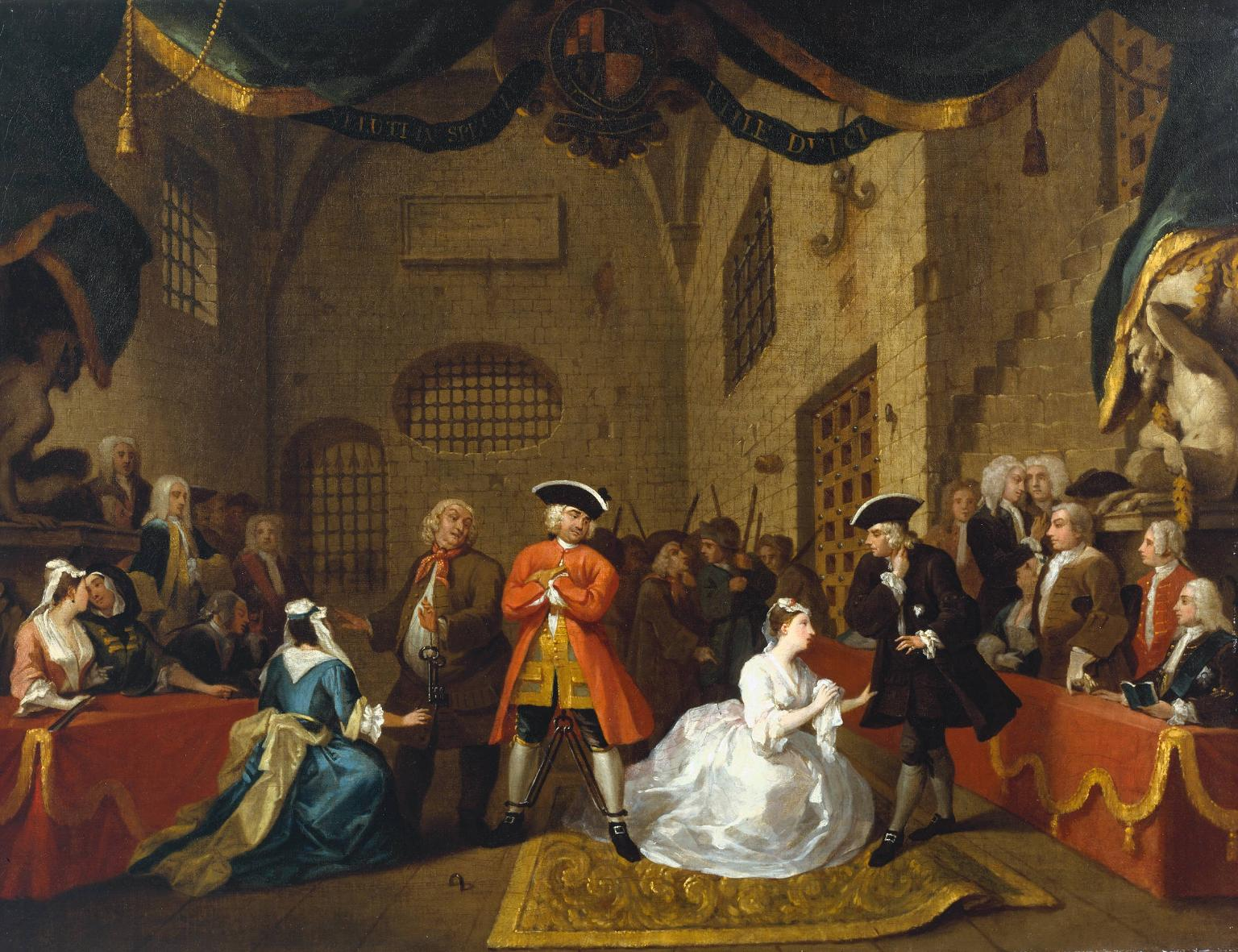
Painting based on The Beggar's Opera, Scene V, William Hogarth, c. 1728

New York's rise as the intellectual and artistic center of the United States occurred in the 1830s. This period, which coincided with an upsurge in American nationalism, saw major growth in choral music, with musical societies being formed in most major cities, like New York; these choral societies remained a fixture of American music throughout the 19th century. Military bands were also common throughout the country, as was singing family troupes such as the Hutchinson Family. Later still, minstrel shows, comic and musical acts performed by whites in blackface, spread across the country. In New York, Italian operas were very popular throughout much of the century.

Near the end of the 19th century, modern conservatories opened in many cities, and New York became the home of the Metropolitan Opera House in 1882 and Carnegie Hall in 1891, the latter's opening being marked by an appearance by the famed Russian composer Pyotr Ilyich Tchaikovsky. In 1892, Antonín Dvořák became Director of the National Conservatory of Music. Dvořák, a Bohemian composer, was fascinated with Native and African American folk music, and he was enthusiastic about encouraging a nationalist American field of music that utilized those fields. Dvořák only stayed on for three years before returning to Bohemia, though he influenced later composers such as his pupil, the African American composer Harry Thacker Burleigh.

George Bristow was an important composer of the latter 19th century. He was a violinist with the New York Philharmonic, later conducting an orchestra called the Harmonic Society. He attempted to popularize an indigenous American sound in his music, using nationalist elements such as a Native American melody in his Symphony No. 4. Theodore Thomas also worked at the New York Philharmonic before forming the New York Symphony Orchestra. He hired many of the best performers of the day in an attempt to lure in audiences, and he promoted a more casual atmosphere to encourage attendance and enthusiasm.

=== Classical and art music history ===
New York's position as a center for European classical music can be traced back to the late 18th- early 19th century. The New York Philharmonic, formed in 1842, did much to help establish the city's reputation. In that same era was organized the short-lived rival to the Philharmonic, the American Academy of Music, founded by Charles Jerome Hopkins (born 1836 in Burlington, Vermont), William Fry, George Bristow, and Charles Steele in 1856. Two of the first major New York composers were William Fry and George Bristow, both of whom were involved in a well-known 1854 controversy over the Philharmonic's programming choices. The controversy consisted of a series of letters published in the Musical World and Times following a poor review of Fry's Santa Claus Symphony. Fry's first letter, responding angrily to the review, claimed that the Philharmonic had played no pieces by American composers, to which Bristow responded that the Philharmonic had played one piece, an overture he had composed. Henry Christian Timm, one of the founders of the Philharmonic, responded by noting a number of recently composed works.

Both Fry and Bristow, despite their support for American compositions, were very European in style. Fry's most notable composition was the opera Leonora, which received mixed reviews upon its opening and was criticized for its debt to Vincenzo Bellini's bel canto style. Bristow was also very European in his style, and was a violinist and conductor with the Philharmonic until the 1854 controversy, though he later rejoined. His most important work was the opera Rip Van Winkle, and was very popular at the time; most influentially, Rip Van Winkle used an American folktale rather than European imitations.

The New York native Edward MacDowell was a major late 19th-century composer, though he spent most of his productive time in Boston. His first concerto was premiered in New York in 1888, and he returned the following year to premier another concerto. MacDowell eventually began using elements of American folk music in his compositions, especially the Woodland Sketches. The Bohemian composer Antonín Dvořák came to New York in 1892 to head the National Conservatory. A fervent nationalist, Dvořák used the folk music of his native land in his music, and encouraged American composers to do the same. One of the Conservatory's students, the African American Harry Burleigh, introduced him to the songs of the minstrel shows and spirituals, and Dvorak was deeply moved, enough to write a well-known essay in an 1895 issue of Harper's declaring that American composers should use the diverse folk elements of their country in their compositions.

In the early 20th century, the New York classical music scene included Charles Griffes, originally from Elmira, New York, who began publishing his most innovative material in 1914. His collaboration with other area performers and composers on The Kairn of Koridwen was an early attempt to use musical themes adopted from non-Western cultures, specifically, Japanese and Javanese music. He was to continue in this vein with the score for Rupert Brooke's "Wai Kiki," the ballet Sho-Jo, or – the Spirit of Wine, A Symbol of Happiness, and his orchestral composition The Pleasure-Dome of Kubla Khan. Besides Griffes, New York composers included Marion Bauer, Leo Ornstein, and Rubin Goldmark, all three of whom were either Jewish immigrants or the children of Jewish immigrants.

The best-known New York composer—indeed, the best-known American classical composer of any kind—was George Gershwin. Gershwin was a songwriter with Tin Pan Alley and the Broadway theaters, and his works were strongly influenced by jazz, or rather the precursors to jazz that were extant during his time. It is not clear that he was a classical musician, though neither is it clear that he worked in jazz, popular music or any other field—he primarily synthesized and utilized elements of many styles, including the music of New York's Yiddish theatre, vaudeville, ragtime, operetta, jazz, Tin Pan Alley and Broadway songs, the music of the Gullah people and the impressionist and post-Romantic music of European composers. Some of his most famous compositions were the Rhapsody in Blue and Concerto in F, both of which utilized jazz idioms. Gershwin's work made American classical music more focused, and attracted an unheard of amount of international attention.

Following Gershwin, the first major composer was Aaron Copland from Brooklyn, who used elements of American folk music, though it remained European in technique and form. His works included the Symphony for Organ and Orchestra (which was well received, earning him comparisons to Stravinsky), the jazz-affected Music for the Theatre, the music for the ballet Appalachian Spring and the Piano Variations. Later, he turned to the ballet and then serial music.

The early-to-mid 20th century New York classical music scene also produced composers such as Roger Sessions, an academically oriented composer known for operas such as Motezuma. The similarly academic William Schuman became known for such works as the New England Triptych and his Third Symphony. Schuman also became president of the Juilliard School, changing the school by forming the Juilliard String Quartet and merging the Institute of Musical Art with the Juilliard Graduate School, as well as hiring teachers including William Bergsma, Peter Mennin and Hugo Weisgall, whose pupils included future composers Steve Reich and Philip Glass.

In the middle of the 20th century, the most influential New York composers included the Massachusetts native and conductor and composer Leonard Bernstein, known for his works Prelude, Fugue, and Riffs, Serenade for Solo Violin, Strings, Harp and Percussion, Chichester Psalms, and the musicals On the Town and West Side Story. Another major composer was Elliott Carter, whom John Warthen Struble claimed would likely be remembered as "the most significant of the mid-20th century... composers [because he] reconceived and restructured the fundamental language of Western art music in evolving his powerful personal style... his music has earned immense respect from colleagues of virtually every esthetic stripe, as well as three generations of performing musicians and audiences." Carter's compositions include Eight Etudes and a Fantasy for Wind Quintet and a Sonata for 'cello and piano. In addition to Carter and Bernstein, in the mid-20th century New York produced the film composer Bernard Herrmann, Gunther Schuller, and serialist Leon Kirchner.

Many of the later 20th-century composers in various modernist and minimalist styles came from outside of New York, such as John Cage from Los Angeles, though many studied, performed, or conducted in New York. John Corigliano, however, is a New York native who has worked exclusively in tonal idioms for most of his career. Steve Reich innovated a technique known as phasing, in which two musical activities are begun simultaneously and repeated, gradually drifting out of sync with each other in a natural evolution. Reich was also very interested in non-Western music, incorporating African rhythmic techniques in his compositions Drumming. Rhys Chatham as well as Glenn Branca blended the minimal music with modern rock esthetics and began writing microtonal pieces for large orchestras of guitarists but also wrote other classical pieces with non-amplified instruments. Kyle Gann is a musicologist as well as a composer of post modern pieces.

Most recently, New York has become home to a Manhattan-based scene sometimes called New Music. These composers and performers are strongly influenced by the minimalist works of Philip Glass, a Baltimore native based out of New York, Meredith Monk, and others. One of the most famous persons from this scene is John Zorn, often cited as a jazz musician though he works in many fields and idioms. Others include Arto Lindsay, Marc Ribot, John Lurie, Laurie Anderson, and Bill Laswell.

== Popular music ==
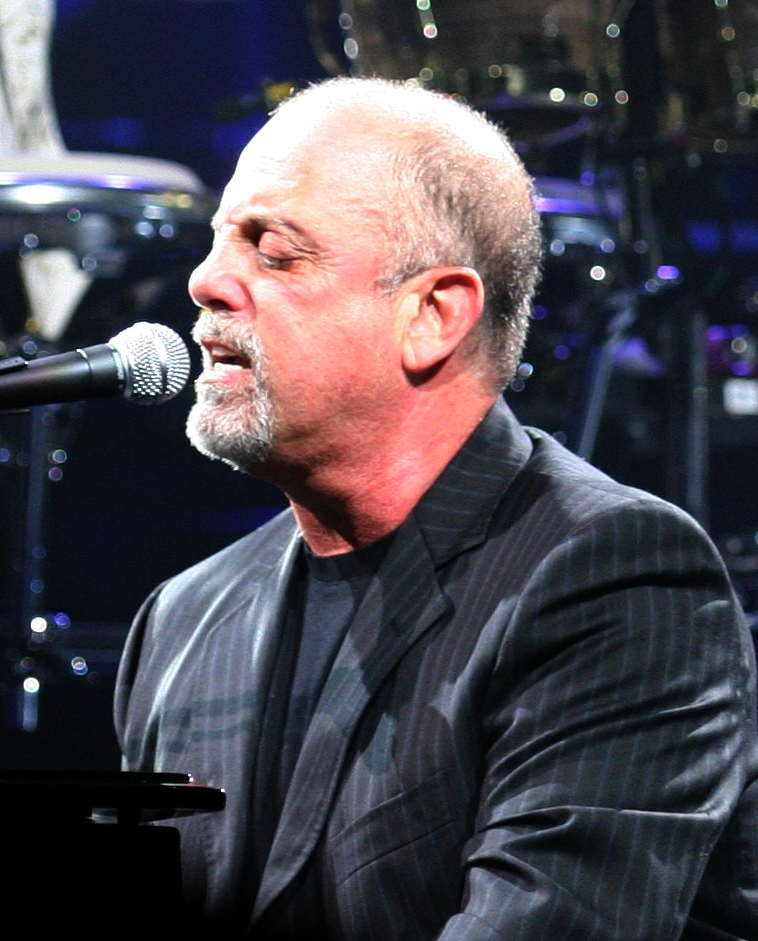
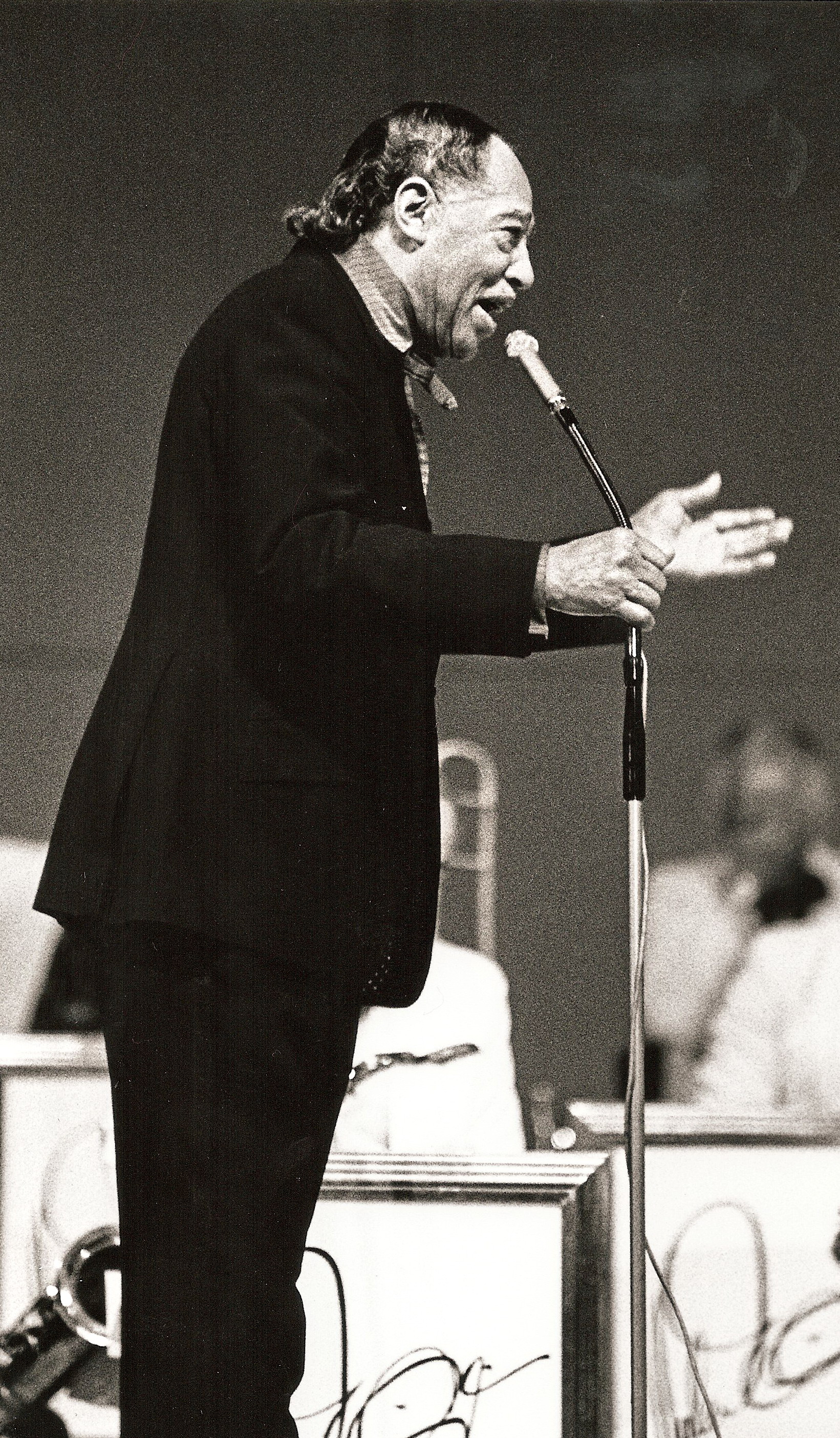
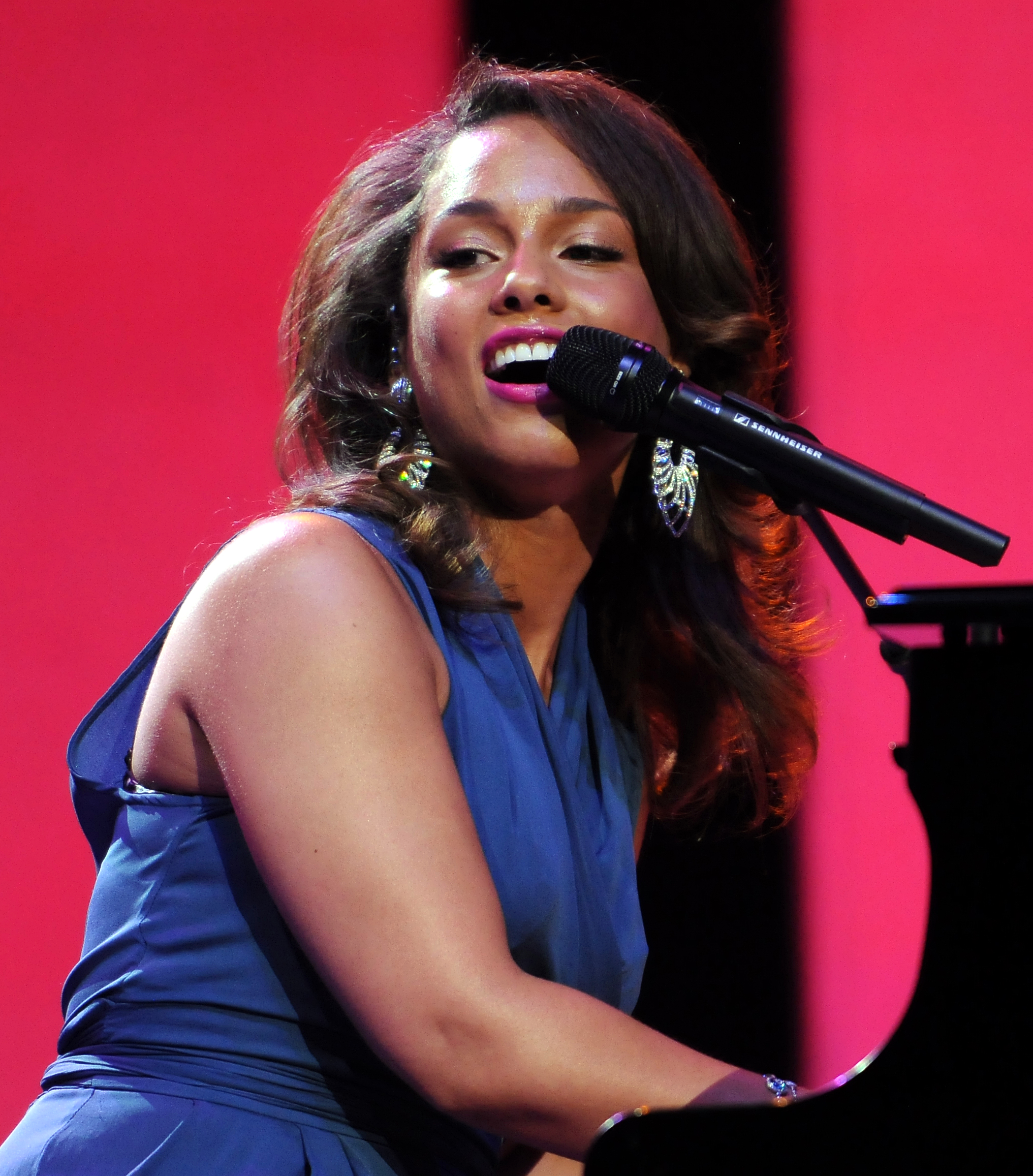
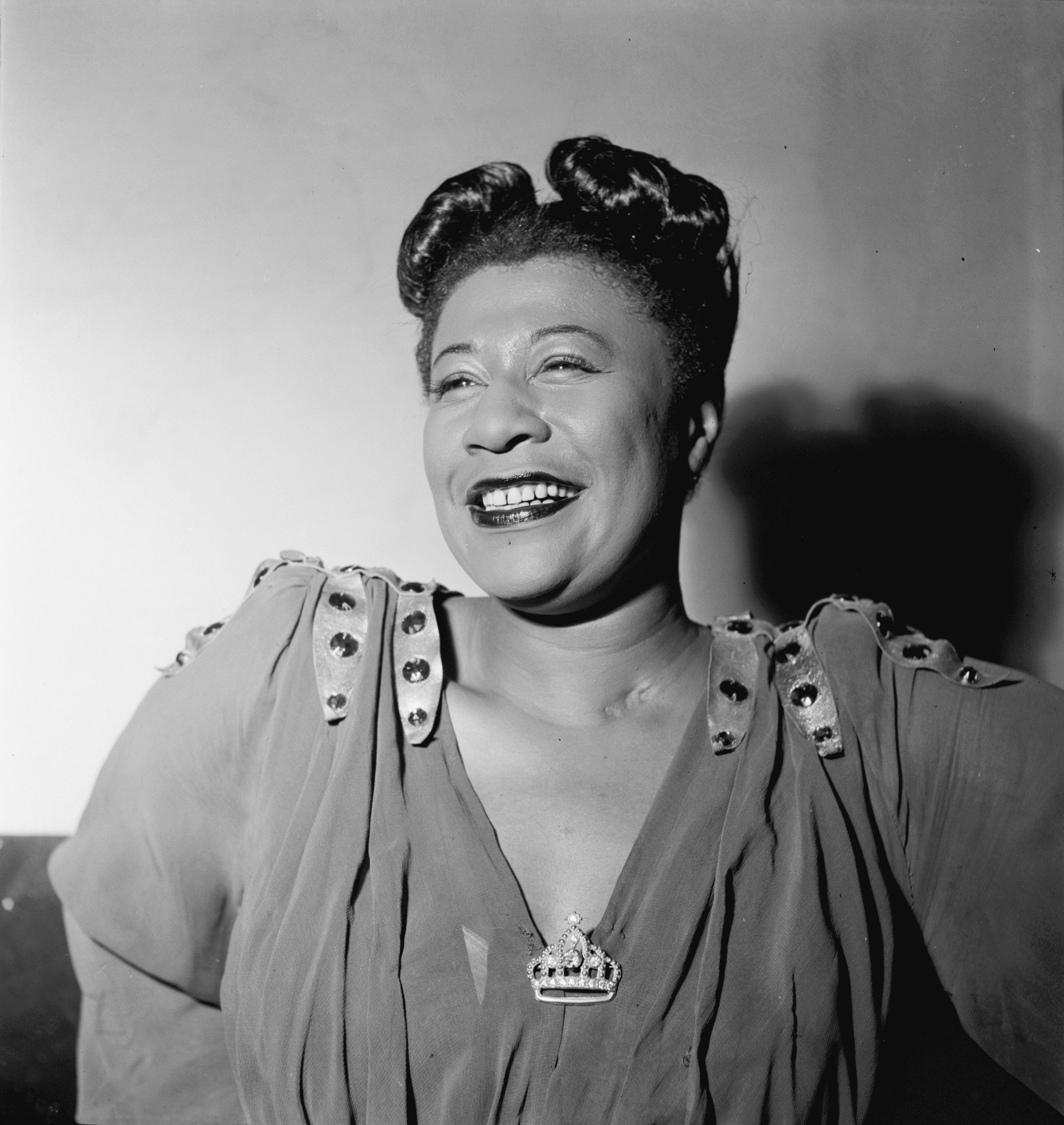
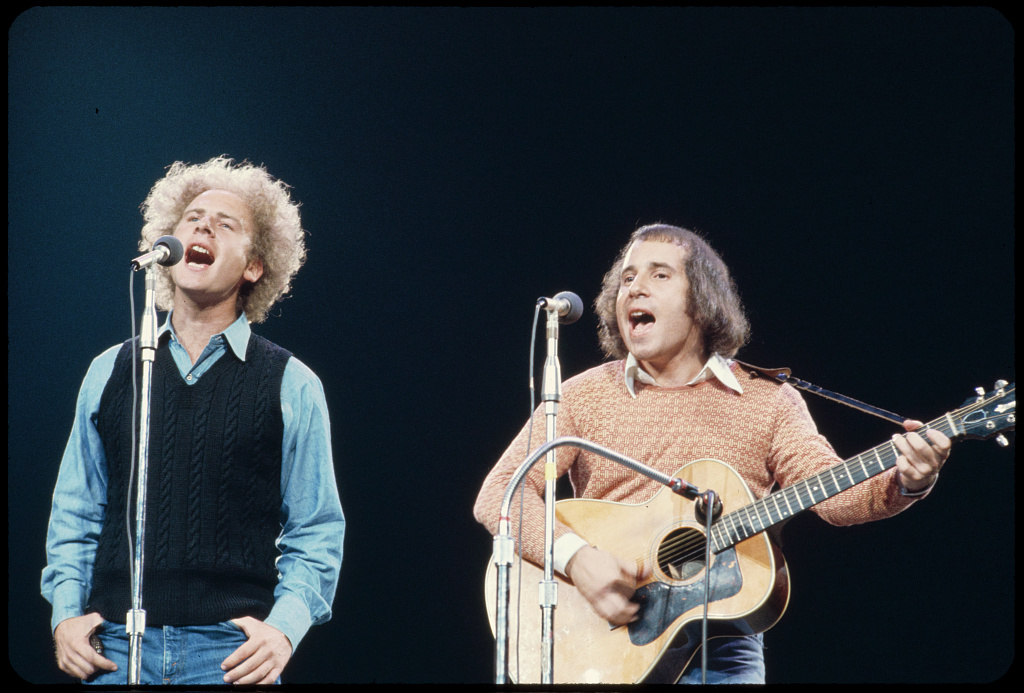
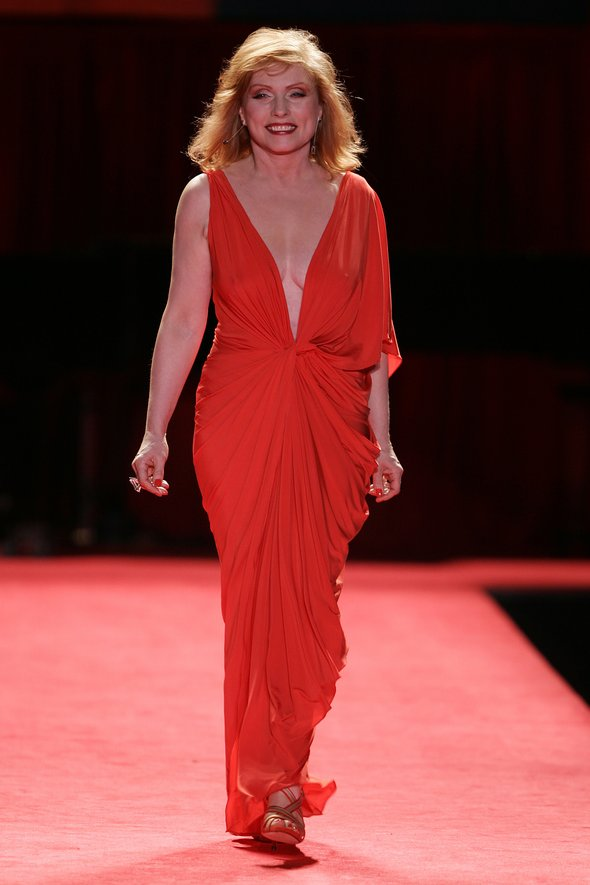
Clockwise from top left: singer-songwriter Billy Joel; jazz musician Duke Ellington; jazz singer Ella Fitzgerald; singer Debbie Harry; singer-songwriters Art Garfunkel and Paul Simon; singer Alicia Keys.

New York has been the longstanding center of the American music industry, and by extension, a major center for popular music worldwide. Attaining iconic musical status in the early 20th century, New York retained its position despite the rise of other cities such as Detroit, Chicago, Los Angeles, Nashville, and San Francisco. However, by the turn of the 21st century, Los Angeles had surpassed New York as the pop music mecca not only in terms of the sheer number of musicians, bands, songwriters, recording studios, and record labels, but also because of its affordability compared to New York, attracting transplants to emerging creative centers like Echo Park.

The African American genre of jazz was closely associated with New York by the middle of the 20th century, when a number of avant-garde performers helped created styles such as hard bop and free jazz. Later still, New York was the major American home for the punk rock and new wave movements, and was the scene for the invention of both hip-hop and Latino salsa music. Musicians from New York have also dominated the Jewish-American klezmer scene, the Greenwich Village old-time music revival, and the straight 1960s pop music exemplified by the Brill Building sound.

=== Pre–Tin Pan Alley ===
As America emerged out of the Civil War, a prolific sheet music industry emerged in New York City, catering to the growing urban middle class. Piano ownership was widespread in middle-class families, and if one wanted to hear a popular new song or melody, one would buy the sheet music and then perform the piece at home. Beginning in the early 1860s, the pianist and composer John Nelson Pattison (active 1862–1890) published sheet music out of a piano and organ salesroom in Union Square.

=== Tin Pan Alley ===
Beginning in the mid 1880s, the music publishers clustered in Union Square were referred to as Tin Pan Alley. This had become the major center for music publishing by the mid-1890s. Tin Pan Alley eventually moved uptown to 28th street. Many professional songwriters lived nearby, churning out songs ready for mainstream audiences during a time that music, like other aspects of American culture, was becoming a national rather than a regional affair.

The songwriters of this era often wrote formulaic songs, many of them sentimental ballads.

(T)hese publishers devised formulas by which songs could be produced with speed and dispatch... Songs were now to be produced from a serviceable matrix, and issued in large quantities: stereotypes for foreign songs, Negro songs, humorous ditties, and, most important of all, sentimental ballads.

Some of the most notable publishers included Willis Woodward, the Witmark house of publishing, Charles K. Harris, and Edward B. Marks and Joseph W. Stern. Stern and Marks began writing together as amateurs in 1894, with "The Little Lost Child"; the song became a hit, selling more than two million copies of its sheet music after its successful promotion as an illustrated song and after it attracted the attention of popular stage performer Della Fox. However, Paul Dresser was, in the words of David Ewen, the "richest contributor of sentimental ballads to Union Square." He was an original composer, less maudlin, less cloyingly sentimental, and less cliché-ridden than his contemporaries.

In addition to the popular, mainstream ballads and other clean-cut songs, some Tin Pan Alley publishers focused on rough songs such as "Drill Ye Tarriers" in 1888, believed to have been written by an unskilled laborer turned stage performer named Thomas F. Casey. Coon songs were another important part of Tin Pan Alley, derived from the watered-down songs of the minstrel show with the "verve and electricity" brought by the "assimilation of the ragtime rhythm." The first popular coon song was "New Coon in Town," introduced in 1883, and was followed by a wave of coon shouters such as Ernest Hogan and May Irwin.

=== Musical theatre ===
The early 20th century also saw the growth of Broadway theatre, a group of theatres specializing in musicals. Broadway became on the preeminent locations for musical theater in the world, and produced a body of songs that led Donald Clarke to call the era (ca. 1914 to 1950), the golden age of songwriting. The need to adapt enjoyable songs to the constraints of a theater and a plot enabled and encouraged a growth in songwriting and the rise of composers such as George Gershwin, Cole Porter, Irving Berlin and Jerome Kern. Most of these songwriters were Jewish, descended from Jews who immigrated from Russia.

Professional Yiddish theater in New York began in 1882 with a troupe founded by Boris Thomashefsky. The plays in the late 19th century were realistic, while in the beginning of the 20th century, they became more political and artistic in orientation. Some performers were well-respected enough to move back and forth between the Yiddish theatre and Broadway, including Bertha Kalich and Jacob Adler. Some of the major composers included Abraham Goldfaden, Joseph Rumshinsky and Sholom Secunda, while playwrights included David Pinski, Solomon Libin, Jacob Gordin, and Leon Kobrin.

=== Blues and jazz ===
The New York blues was a type of blues music, characterized by significant jazz influences and a more modernized, urban feel than the country blues. It arose in New York in the early part of the 20th century, and quickly spread to other urban areas and, often, more affluent listeners than country blues, which is distinctively rural in nature. Prominent musicians from this field include Lionel Hampton, Ethel Waters, and Joe Turner.

In New York, jazz was fused with stride (an advanced form of ragtime) and became highly evolved, notably in the compositions of James P. Johnson in the 1920s. Fletcher Henderson's jazz orchestra, first appearing in 1923 and including Coleman Hawkins (and later New Orleans musician Louis Armstrong) became wildly popular and helped invent swing music. Though Henderson was among the first major New York jazz musicians, he was not as able to adapt to the rapidly changing style as some of his contemporaries, such as Duke Ellington. When Ellington moved to New York, he inaugurated a legion of jazz musicians that did the same and moved the center of jazz's development from Chicago to New York.

The style that developed from New York's big jazz bands became known as swing music; it was a very danceable and catchy style, played originally by large black orchestras. Later, white bands led by musicians such as Jimmy Dorsey and Benny Goodman began to dominate. These large orchestras produced a number of instrumentalists that had a profound effect on the later evolution of jazz, including Coleman Hawkins' tenor saxophone innovations, electric guitarist Charlie Christian, and improvisational Lester Young. Star vocalists also emerged, mainly women, such as the bluesy Billie Holiday and the scat singer Ella Fitzgerald.

New York's jazz scene was the home of bebop, which evolved over many years and reached its full identity in the mid-1940s. Charlie Christian, Dizzy Gillespie, Charlie Parker, and Thelonious Monk were among the major innovators of the style. Bebop "polarized listeners, critics and musicians alike" because it differed from swing in many important ways, including a lack of typical riffs and danceable beats, the use of melodic progression and the chords as the basis for all soloing and improvising.

In the 1950s, jazz began to diversify into a number of new genres, spread out into many cities. The West Coast became a home for cool jazz, though the style's major innovator was New York-based Miles Davis. New York was also a major center for hard bop, and was home to Sonny Rollins and Art Blakey. Late in the 1950s, the Los Angeles-based Ornette Coleman moved to New York, bringing with him the nascent style of free jazz. He was later joined by a number of others, most famously including John Coltrane and his contemporaries, such as Albert Ayler and Sun Ra.

The last few decades have seen a further diffusion of jazz from New York and other major long-time capitals, to cities and regions across the United States and the world. Many New York jazz performers during this period played fusions of jazz with rock and other styles; among the earliest of these modern musicians was Carla Bley, cofounder of the Jazz Composers Orchestra Association, an independent distribution company for avant-garde and jazz artists. The city has also been home to the well-known modern performer from New Orleans, Louisiana, Wynton Marsalis and the large M-Base Collective, as well as people such as John Zorn who use jazz as a prominent part of their experimental music in many different styles.

The neo-soul/jazz band Youman Wilder/Featuring Weird Stories is a New York-born-and-bred band with a following in Europe, Canada, and Asia. Wilder was one of late Grammy Award-winning singer Amy Winehouse's favorite vocalists.

=== Doo-wop ===
Although other cities such as Philadelphia and Chicago would have strong doo-wop scenes, the sound of doo-wop, characterized by group vocals harmonies and nonsense syllables, was nurtured on the streets of New York by early pioneers of the sound such as the Ravens, the Crows, the Chords, and especially the Drifters, who would enjoy a long and very prolific career. By the 1950s, a plethora of groups would hail from New York, including Frankie Lymon & the Teenagers; the Crests, led by Johnny Maestro of the Brooklyn Bridge, which became synonymous with Brooklyn doo-wop; the Rays; the Mystics; and pioneering female groups the Bobbettes and the Chantels, who would influence the girl group sound of the 1960s.

==== List of notable doo wop groups from New York ====
- The Bobbettes
- The Bonnie Sisters
- The Brooklyn Bridge
- The Cadillacs
- The Capris
- Cathy Jean and the Roommates
- The Chantels
- The Chimes
- The Chords
- The Cleftones
- The Crests
- The Crows
- The Danleers
- Dion and the Belmonts
- Don and Juan
- The Drifters (No. 1 Billboard Hot 100 hit with "Save the Last Dance For Me" in 1960), sang "On Broadway"
- The Dubs
- The Hearts
- The Impalas
- The Jive Five
- Johnnie & Joe
- Little Anthony and the Imperials
- The Mystics
- The Quin-Tones
- Randy & the Rainbows
- The Rays
- The Tokens (No. 1 Billboard Hot 100 hit with "The Lion Sleeps Tonight" in 1961)

=== Greenwich Village ===
Beginning in the 1940s, New York was the center for a roots revival of American folk music. Many New Yorkers, especially young people, became interested in blues, Appalachian folk music, and other roots styles. In Greenwich Village, many of these people gathered; the area became a hotbed of American folk music as well as leftist political activism.

The performers associated with the Greenwich Village scene, many of whom were not originally from New York, had sporadic mainstream success in the 1940s and 1950s; some, such as Pete Seeger and the Almanac Trio, did well, but most were confined to local coffeehouses and other venues. Performers such as Dave Van Ronk and Joan Baez helped expand the scene by appealing to college students. In the early 1960s, Baez was instrumental in introducing the up-and-coming young folk artist Bob Dylan to her audience and he quickly achieved national prominence. By the mid-1960s, folk and rock were merging, with Bob Dylan taking the lead in July 1965, releasing "Like a Rolling Stone," with a revolutionary rock sound for its time, steeped in tawdry New York imagery, followed by an electric performance in late July at the Newport Folk Festival. Dylan plugged an entire generation into the milieu of the singer-songwriter, often writing from an urban, New York point of view. By the mid-to-late 1960s, bands and singer/songwriters began to proliferate the underground New York art and music scene. The release of The Velvet Underground & Nico in 1967, featuring singer-songwriter Lou Reed and collaborator Nico, was described as the "most prophetic rock album ever made" by Rolling Stone in 2003. New York in the mid-to-late 1960s gave birth to the contemporary singer/songwriter, with the urban landscape as a canvass for lyrics in the confessional style of poets like Anne Sexton and Sylvia Plath. In July 1969, Newsweek magazine's feature story, "The Girls-Letting Go," described the groundbreaking music of Joni Mitchell, Laura Nyro, Lotti Golden, and Melanie as a new breed of female troubadour: "What is common to them are the personalized songs they write, like voyages of self discovery, startling in the impact of their poetry." The work of these early New York-based singer/songwriters, from Laura Nyro's insightful New York Tendaberry, released in 1969, to Lotti Golden's adventurous East Village, Manhattan, diaries on Motor-Cycle, her 1969 debut on Atlantic Records, has served as inspiration to generations of female singer/songwriters in the rock, folk, and jazz traditions. The Guardian in January 2017 paid homage to the female singer/songwriters featured in Newsweek's July 1969 article, in a piece by Laura Barton: "Newsweek published an article under the headline 'The Girls – Letting Go,' charting the burgeoning careers of a group of young musicians it termed 'a new school of talented female troubadours.' They sang about politics, love affairs, the urban landscape, drugs, disappointment, and the life and loneliness of the itinerant performers, subjects that, hitherto, had largely been the preserve of male musicians." New York would see a revived interest in folk and singer/songwriters in the 1980s and 1990s led by artists like Suzanne Vega.

==== List of notable singer-songwriters and folk artists from New York ====
- Joan Baez
- Keith Barbour
- Harry Chapin #1 Billboard Hot 100 hit with "Cat's in the Cradle" in '74
- Alana Davis
- Art Garfunkel
- Terry Gilkyson
- Arlo Guthrie
- Lotti Golden
- Richie Havens
- Sophie B. Hawkins
- Janis Ian
- Carole King #1 Hot 100 hit with "It's Too Late" in '71
- Melanie #1 Hot 100 hit with "Brand New Key" in '71
- David Cassidy
- Ingrid Michaelson
- Maria Muldaur
- Harry Nilsson #1 Hot 100 hit with "Without You" in '72
- Laura Nyro
- Michael Penn
- The Rooftop Singers #1 Hot 100 hit with "Walk Right In" in '63
- John Sebastian #1 Hot 100 hit with "Welcome Back" in '76
- Carly Simon #1 Hot 100 hit with "You're So Vain" in '73
- Suzanne Vega
- Peter Yarrow

=== Electronic dance music ===
Disco is an up-tempo style of dance music that originated in the early 1970s, with its center in the United States in New York. As discothèques grew more popular later in the decade, they began moving to larger venues as the sound became popularized by artists such as Newark native Gloria Gaynor. Many of these were in New York, including Paradise Garage and Studio 54.

As the disco trend faded, dance clubs continued to have a home in New York into the 1980s in trendy clubs such as Danceteria, remembered perhaps best as the club where arguably dance music's diva, Madonna, began her career. Club music added electronically generated sounds and samples of music such as jazz, blues, and European and Japanese electronic music.

In the early 1980s, house music, a direct descendant of disco, was forged in the underground clubs of Chicago, Detroit, and New York.

Freestyle also originated in New York during the 1980s. A sound characterized by a mixture of Latin music beats and melodies fused with elements of hip-hop and electro, it became popularized by New York natives such as Lisa Lisa and Cult Jam and Brenda K. Starr.

==== List of notable contemporary R&B and club artists from New York ====
- Alisha
- B. B. & Q. Band
- Brass Construction
- Breakfast Club
- Sharon Redd
- B. T. Express
- Jimmy Castor Bunch
- C+C Music Factory (#1 Hot 100 hit with "Gonna Make You Sweat (Everybody Dance Now)" in 1991)
- Cameo
- Irene Cara (#1 Billboard Hot 100 hit with "Flashdance... What a Feeling" in 1983)
- Chic (2 #1 Hot 100 hits, including "Le Freak" in 1978)
- Corina
- The Cover Girls
- Crown Heights Affair
- Deee-Lite
- David Cassidy
- Kat DeLuna
- Carol Douglas
- D Train
- Evelyn "Champagne" King
- Fatback Band
- Lady Gaga (has had 5 #1 Billboard Hot 100 hits)
- Freddie Jackson
- LCD Soundsystem
- Kashif
- Lisa Lisa & Cult Jam (2 #1 Hot 100 hits, including "Head to Toe" in 1987)
- Lisette Melendez
- Melba Moore
- Mtume
- Odyssey sang "Native New Yorker" in 1977
- Reel 2 Real
- Robin S.
- Vicki Sue Robinson
- Sa-Fire
- Seduction
- Brenda K. Starr
- Sweet Sensation
- Lana Del Rey

=== Latin music ===
Salsa is a style of Latin music that incorporates multiple styles and variations. It was developed by mid-1960s groups of New York City-area Cuban and Puerto Rican immigrants to the United States, such as Machito and Tito Puente, with later variants such as salsa dura. Salsa, along with other Latin American genres, has become extremely popular in New York. Latin dancing is also very popular. Salsa, a music predominantly derived from the Cuban son montuno, was imported back to Latin America where it has become popular over the past 40 years. Salsa aficionados the world over know that the origin of the music is uniquely tied to New York.

The same phenomenon has recently occurred with yet another type of Latin rhythm, bachata. Bachata is dominated by Dominicans, especially Dominicans from New York's Washington Heights neighborhood. From The Bronx came bachata's most popular band Aventura, whose lead singer Romeo Santos embarked on a successful solo career in 2011.

Reggaeton, a popular Latin urban genre originating from Panama and Puerto Rico, is also popular in New York, especially among young Hispanics. Reggaeton artists from New York include Arcángel, De La Ghetto, N.O.R.E., and Vico C.

=== Hip-hop ===
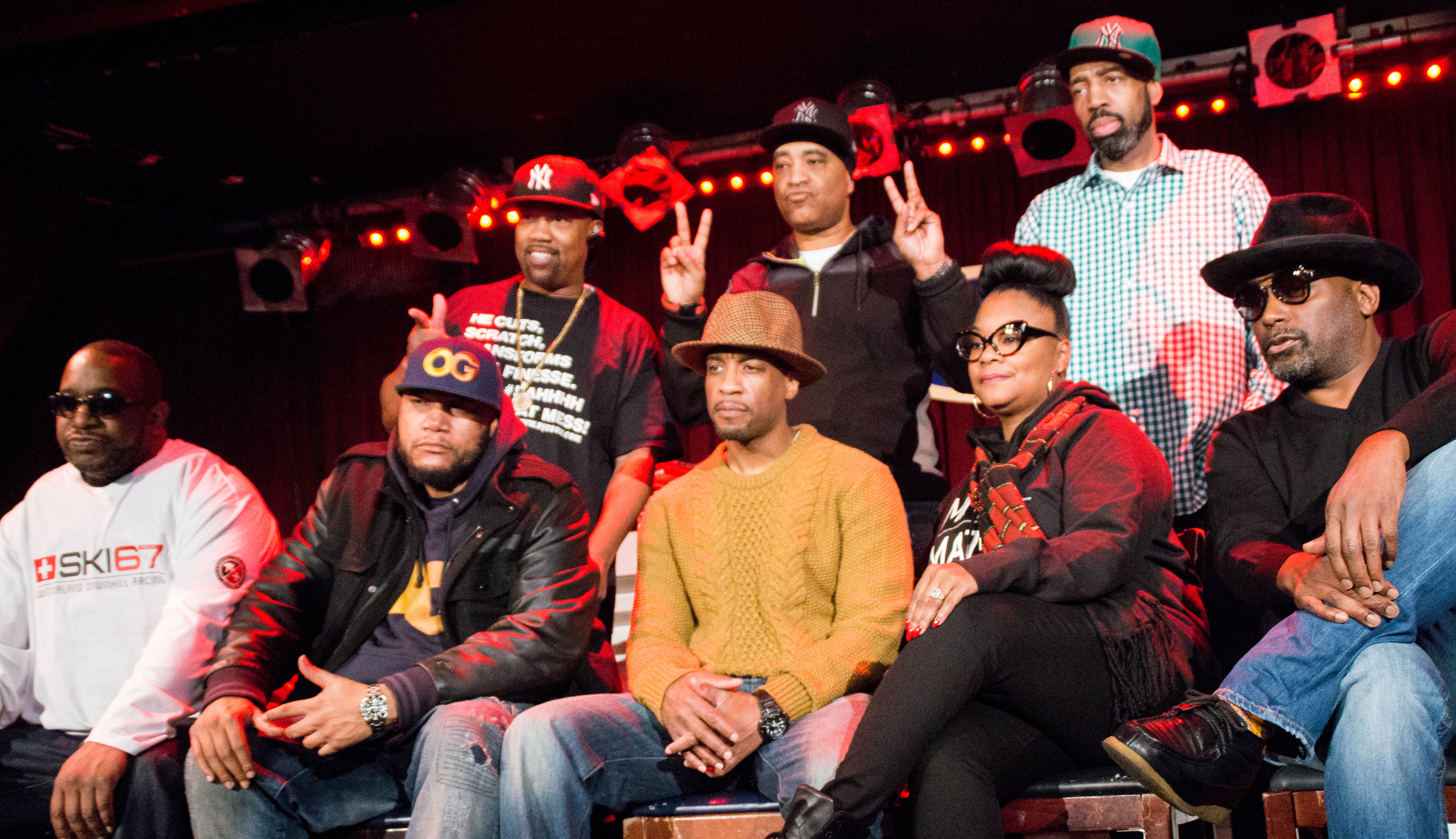
Juice Crew, pictured in 2016. Top row left to right: DJ Cool V, Marley Marl, Grand Daddy I.U. Bottom row left to right: Kool G Rap, Craig G, Masta Ace, Roxanne Shante, Big Daddy Kane

New York gave rise to the creation of hip-hop music and electro in the late 1970s and early 1980s. "Rapper's Delight" is widely regarded as the first hip-hop record to gain widespread popularity in the mainstream. The genre got its start at neighborhood block parties when DJs such as Kool Herc began isolating percussion breaks in funk and R&B songs, eventually rapping while the audience danced. From the late 1970s to about 1984, New York was the only city with a major hip-hop scene, and the demand for records created competing independent record labels, including Profile Records, Sugar Hill Records, Enjoy Records and Tommy Boy Records, pumping out 12" records at a furuious pace due to the popularity of the new genre, the incredible creativity of the early hip-hop producers and artists, as well as the profitability of the new market. Labels were able to issue quality recordings due to the affordability of new technology, primarily the Roland TR-808 drum machine. The first wave of hip-hop records (old-school hip-hop), pomolgated by producers, artists, and writers including Arthur Baker, Afrika Bambaataa, Grandmaster Flash, Melle Mel, DJ Kool Herc, Bobby Robinson, Lotti Golden and Spoonie Gee, were electronic, some with rap vocals and some without. The year 1982 was prolific, with seminal recordings like "The Message," "Planet Rock", and "Nunk" exploring social issues, also known as conscious rap, and fusing electro with hip-hop introducing a sci-fi, Afrofuturist perspective. By 1984, hip-hop began to change; new sparse beats and rock samples gave the genre a harder edge, with groups like Run-DMC and the Beastie Boys and producers Russel Simmons and Rick Rubin at the forefront of a new iteration of the genre. Hip-hop's early years saw an ongoing rivalry between the boroughs of New York, with each seeking credit for its rightful contributions to the culture. The original "beef" pitted The Bronx, led by Boogie Down Productions, against Marley Marl's Queens-based Juice Crew.

By the early 1990s, however, West Coast rap from Los Angeles was gaining national fame. In 1992, Dr. Dre's The Chronic became a national hit and made the West Coast the most popular center of hip-hop. However, in 1993, with the release of Black Moon's Enta da Stage and later on Wu-Tang Clan's 36 Chambers in the same year, East Coast hip-hop made a major comeback. The release of Nas's Illmatic and the Notorious B.I.G.'s Ready to Die in 1994 made New York the most popular center of hip-hop once again in a timeframe of just two years. The West Coast never again enjoyed such levels of success as they did in 1992 and 1993. However, the East Coast delivered one classic album after another for the rest of the decade. Most prominent of the releases include Mobb Deep's The Infamous and Hell on Earth, Jay-Z's Reasonable Doubt, and DMX's It's Dark and Hell Is Hot. Mase's Harlem World cemented him as the most popular MC in New York in the late 1990s. However, he left the industry to pursue other callings. The East Coast still remains a prominent center of hip-hop in the current scene, but their mainstream appeal has been somewhat taken over by the rappers from the Southern states of the U.S.

Each borough or area of New York City has its fair share of associated hip-hop acts, both commercially successful and underground. KRS-One, Fat Joe, Big Pun, and Slick Rick all grew up in The Bronx, although the latter originated from London, England. Wu-Tang Clan put Staten Island on the hip-hop map, renaming the borough "Shaolin". LL Cool J, Run-DMC, Salt-N-Pepa, Eric B. & Rakim, Black Sheep, A Tribe Called Quest, Akinyele, Ja Rule, 21 Quest, Pharoahe Monch, Nicki Minaj, and 50 Cent are all from Queens. Additionally, the Queensbridge Projects in Queens have been an epicenter of hip-hop, producing the Juice Crew (Marley Marl, MC Shan, Kool G Rap, Roxanne Shante), Mobb Deep, Capone-N-Noreaga, and Nas. In order of appearance, Brooklyn has produced Whodini, Newcleus, Audio Two, Full Force, MC Lyte, Gang Starr, Jeru the Damaja, Masta Ace, Boot Camp Clik, AZ, Busta Rhymes, Foxy Brown, Talib Kweli, Afu-Ra, M.O.P., Shyne, and Siah and Yeshua DapoED. The Bedford–Stuyvesant neighborhood has been a hotbed for successful hip-hop artists, including Junior M.A.F.I.A. (consisting of the Notorious B.I.G., Lil' Kim, Lil' Cease, Mase, and others), Big Daddy Kane, Jay-Z, Killah Priest, Mos Def, and Joey Badass. Lastly, the island of Manhattan, particularly Harlem, is home to artists such as Kurtis Blow, Doug E. Fresh (an implant form Barbados), Biz Markie, 2 Black 2 Strong, Big L, Immortal Technique, Vast Aire, Azealia Banks, Cam'ron, Mase, Black Rob, Mims, Street P, Dipset, Eyston, Warp 9, and ASAP Rocky.

In modern day, New York City's drill musicians have achieved local and global popularity. Brooklyn drill artists include Pop Smoke, Fivio Foreign, Sheff G, Sleepy Hallow, Bizzy Banks, J.I the Prince of N.Y, Jay Critch and more. Prominent artists of the sample drill style, originating in the Bronx, include Big Yaya, Kay Flock, B-Lovee, and more.

=== Rock ===
Since the beginning of the genre, New York has been a vital force in the shaping of rock 'n' roll. DJ Alan Freed, perhaps the most influential force in popularizing rock 'n' roll, broadcast his highly influential show from WINS, which became one of the earliest exclusively rock 'n' roll stations. Early rock 'n' roll sounds such as doo-wop and girl group were nurtured in New York.

==== List of notable rock artists from New York ====
- Billy Joel
- Blondie
- Blood, Sweat & Tears
- Blues Magoos
- Blue Öyster Cult
- Cyndi Lauper (2 #1 Hot 100 hits, like "Time After Time" in 1984)
- Enon
- Every Mother's Son
- The Fleshtones
- Gary Lewis & the Playboys
- Geese
- Interpol
- Kiss
- LCD Soundsystem
- Lotti Golden
- Lou Reed
- The Lovin' Spoonful (#1 Billboard Hot 100 hit with "Summer in the City" in 1966)
- Mountain
- New York Dolls
- Orleans
- Patti Smith
- Peter Wolf
- Quarters of Change
- Ramones
- Sonic Youth
- Spider
- Spin Doctors
- Steely Dan
- Stories
- The Strokes
- Talking Heads
- Television
- Vanilla Fudge
- The Velvet Underground
- Walter Egan
- White Lion
- Winger
- Yeah Yeah Yeahs

==== Proto punk, punk, new wave and no wave ====
New York had the earliest documented punk rock scene. Drawing on local influences such as the Velvet Underground, Richard Hell, and the New York Dolls, punk music developed at clubs such as CBGB and Max's Kansas City. Patti Smith, Talking Heads, Blondie, Suicide, Television, the Fleshtones, and other artsy new wave artists were popular in the mid-to-late 1970s, as bands like the Ramones were establishing the punk rock sound. CBGB and Max's Kansas City opened their doors and became influential venues. No Wave was a short-lived rock movement in New York and raised James Chance, DNA, Glenn Branca, Lydia Lunch, the Contortions, Teenage Jesus and the Jerks, Mars began experimenting with noise, dissonance and atonality in addition to non-rock styles. Brian Eno-produced No New York compilation, often considered the quintessential testament to the scene. Swans, and later Sonic Youth were famous in the New York punk scene.

==== Hardcore punk and ska ====
In the early 1980s, hardcore punk was developing primarily in Southern California and Washington, D.C. The New York hardcore scene was founded by 1981, and bands such as Reagan Youth and Kraut led the initial charge. By 1985, the New York hardcore scene had become inhabited by straight edgers and skinheads, including bands such as Agnostic Front, Cro-Mags, Heart Attack, Youth of Today, the Plasmatics, Warzone, and Murphy's Law. With the collapse of the CBGB hardcore matinees due to constant violence, a more activist DIY scene began to develop around ABC No Rio and the squats of the Lower East Side. New York has been at the center of the United States third wave ska scene. The founders of third wave ska, which drew on British Two-Tone ska, were New York bands such as the Toasters and Urban Blight. In the early 1980s, Toasters singer/guitarist and songwriter Robert 'Bucket' Hingley established Moon Ska Records; the label operated until the late 1990s, giving many ska bands from New York and elsewhere international exposure. Some of the other ska bands to come from the New York scene were Skinnerbox, The Slackers, and Mephiskapheles. Other major hardcore punk bands from New York are Sick of It All, H_{2}O, and Madball. There are also ska-jazz bands, such as the New York Ska Jazz Ensemble.

==== Heavy metal ====
New York has also contributed to the heavy metal genre, with bands such as Sir Lord Baltimore and Blue Öyster Cult gaining attention from the early 1970s. During the 1980s and 1990s, it was a major center of the East Coast thrash metal scene, which produced the bands Anthrax, Overkill (originally from New Jersey), Nuclear Assault, Toxik and Carnivore. Funk metal groups such as Living Colour and 24-7 Spyz, and alternative metal groups such as Prong and Helmet, also emerged from the growing New York metal scene. Three other major metal bands from New York are Type O Negative, Emmure, and Life of Agony, all from Brooklyn.

In the 1990s and later, New York and its environs developed a small but influential death metal scene. Suffocation, one of the best-known bands to emerge from the scene, earned a good deal of notoriety for their brutal, complex, and uncompromising style. Another long-lived New York death metal group is Immolation, whose innovative use of dissonance helped to establish them as underground favorites. Other bands associated with New York death metal are Mortician and Incantation, the latter being originally from Pennsylvania.

== See also ==
- Culture of New York City
- List of songs about New York City
