= Eyston =

Eyston is a surname. Notable people with the surname include:

- Bernard Eyston (1628–1709), English Franciscan friar
- Charles Eyston (1667–1721), English antiquary
- George Eyston (1897–1979), British racing car driver, engineer, and inventor

== See also ==
- Easton (surname)
- Eston (name)
