= Lavinia Smith =

British teacher and museum founder (1871–1944)

Lavinia Dugan Smith
- Born: 29 July 1871; Portsmouth, Scioto County, Ohio, US
- Died: 3 August 1944 (aged 73); Oxford, Oxfordshire, United Kingdom
- Known for: Museum in East Hendred

Lavinia Dugan Smith (29 July 1871 – 3 August 1944) was a teacher and museum founder in East Hendred, Oxfordshire.

== Early life in America ==
Lavinia Dugan Smith was born on 29 July 1871 in Portsmouth, Ohio, United States. Her parents were Daniel Smith and Alice Smith (née Gallagher). Daniel Smith was born in Bavaria, Germany, in 1843 and both his parents John A Smith and Elizabeth Smith were born in Bavaria. Daniel Smith, his parents and his three elder brothers emigrated to the US when Daniel was around 5 years old.

Smith's sister Frances Elizabeth Smith was born on 27 November 1873 in Portsmouth, Ohio.

Smith was educated in Portsmouth schools, and according to her obituary she studied at the Episcopal School for Girls in Gambier, Ohio. In 1890 she enrolled at Wellesley College, Wellesey, Massachusetts, United States. She graduated with a BA in 1894. Smith was as associate art editor of the senior class year book in 1894, the Legenda, and member of the Shakespeare Society.

From 1894 to 1898 she taught at Bishop Hopkins Hall, Burlington, Vermont. This Episcopal foundation had a Girls school which ran for just over a decade from 1888 to 1900, closing due to financial difficulties.

From 1898 to 1900 Lavinia taught at Harcourt Place Seminary in Gambier, Ohio. The Harcourt Place Seminary for Young Ladies and Girls was a boarding school for girls. Harcourt Place Seminary has strong links to Wellesley College, through its faculty members and students going on to the college.

== Life in the United Kingdom ==
Around 1905 Smith moved to England, where she lived for 40 years. In 1906 Smith gained a Lambeth Diploma of Student in Theology awarded by the Archbishop of Canterbury. Smith was one of the first women to gain the qualification that enabled women to study theology, mainly so that they could teach religious education in schools and churches.

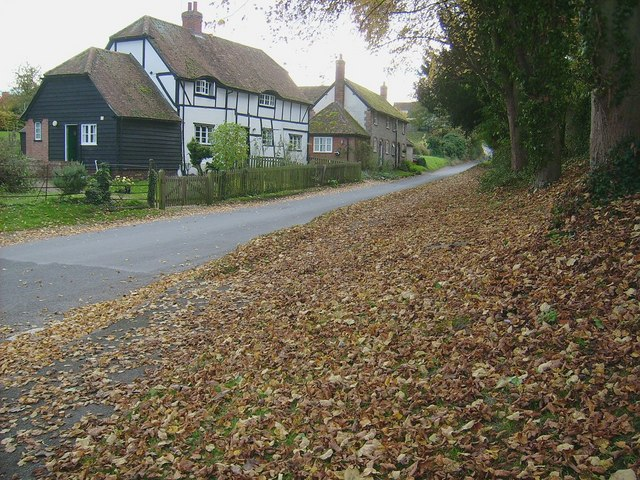
Newbury Road, East Hendred

In 1907 Smith became a member of the Community of St Mary the Virgin, Wantage. In 1911 she was working for the Community as a teacher at St Dunstan's Abbey School in Plymouth, as a sister in religion. The Anglican convent of St Dunstan's Abbey operated by the Sisters of the Holy Trinity closed in 1906 but in 1907 the property was transferred to the Community of St Mary the Virgin at Wantage, who continued to run St Dunstan's Abbey School for Girls.

In 1910 she was awarded a diploma at Oxford in theory, history and practice in education. In the 1910s Smith also taught in other schools of the Community of St Mary the Virgin, including St Helen's School for Girls, Abingdon-on-Thames.

In around 1920 Smith moved to Downside, a Tudor house, Newbury Road, East Hendred, leaving the Community of St Mary the Virgin. In May 1922 Smith's sister Frances applied for a passport to go on holiday to Europe and visit her sister in England, and possibly to take up residence in England.

Between 1928 and 1931 Smith worked as Private Secretary to the Bishop of Gloucester, Arthur Cayley Headlam. She coached students in Latin and Greek for entrance exams at Oxford University.

== East Hendred Museum ==
Smith collected objects to form a museum of agricultural and village antiquities illustrating old English village life. She opened her museum on Whit Sunday in 1933. She welcomed school children as visitors. She kept records of the collection and who donated the items.

== Later life ==
In the 1930s and 1940s Smith continued to live at Downside, with her sister Frances, and friends. In around 1941-1942 Smith had a bad stroke, but recovered.

Smith was keen to move to St John's Home, an independent residential care for the elderly, in Oxford run by the All Saints Sisters of the Poor. She was on a two-week respite at St John's Home when she had a stroke from which she did not regain consciousness. She died on 3 August 1944. She was 74.

She left her home and possessions to Miss Dorothy May Lyddon Rippon, an old friend and pupil, who entrusted the village museum objects to the Berkshire Education Committee. In February 1951 the Berkshire Education Committee transferred the objects and archives to the Museum of English Rural Life. Smith wished that the collection did not leave Berkshire, and that the collection was kept together. Although due to county boundary changes in 1974 the village of East Hendred moved into Oxfordshire.

The Champs Chapel Museum of East Hendred has archives for Lavinia Smith.
