= Scutchamer Knob =

Archaeological site in Oxfordshire, England

Coordinates: 51.5624°N 1.3428°W

Location of Scutchamer Knob in Oxfordshire

Scutchamer Knob, also known as Cuckhamsley Hill and occasionally as Scotsman's Knob or Beacon Hill, is an early Iron Age round barrow on the Ridgeway National Trail at East Hendred Down in the English county of Oxfordshire (formerly in Berkshire).

Originally called Cwichelmeshlaew or Cwichelm's Barrow, it is recorded as having been the place where King Edwin of Northumbria killed Cwichelm of Wessex in AD 636 and, in the Middle Ages, became the meeting point of the shire moot (or market) which was abolished in 1620. It was long thought to be the actual burial place of Cwichelm but the mound has been excavated several times without serious finds. In 1006, the Anglo-Saxon Chronicle states that the Danes marched to Cuckhamsley Hill as they believed that if they reached the Hill, they would never return to the sea.

An alternate explanation is that the name is based on the word "scutcher", and where products derived from this practice.

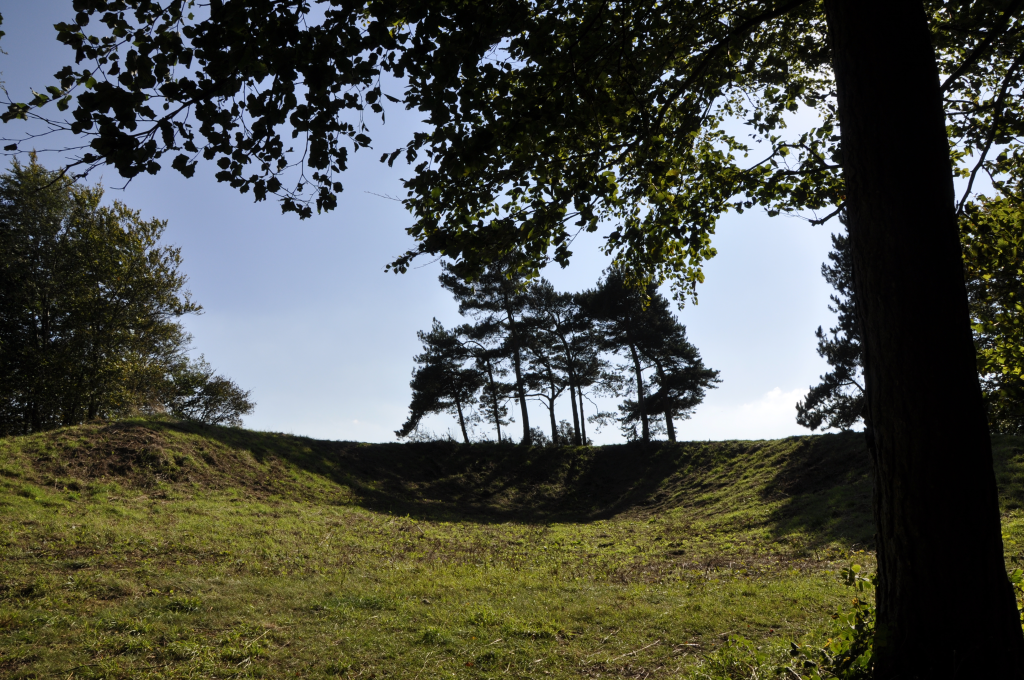
Scutchamer Knob looking SW
