= Museum of English Rural Life =

Agricultural museum in Reading, England

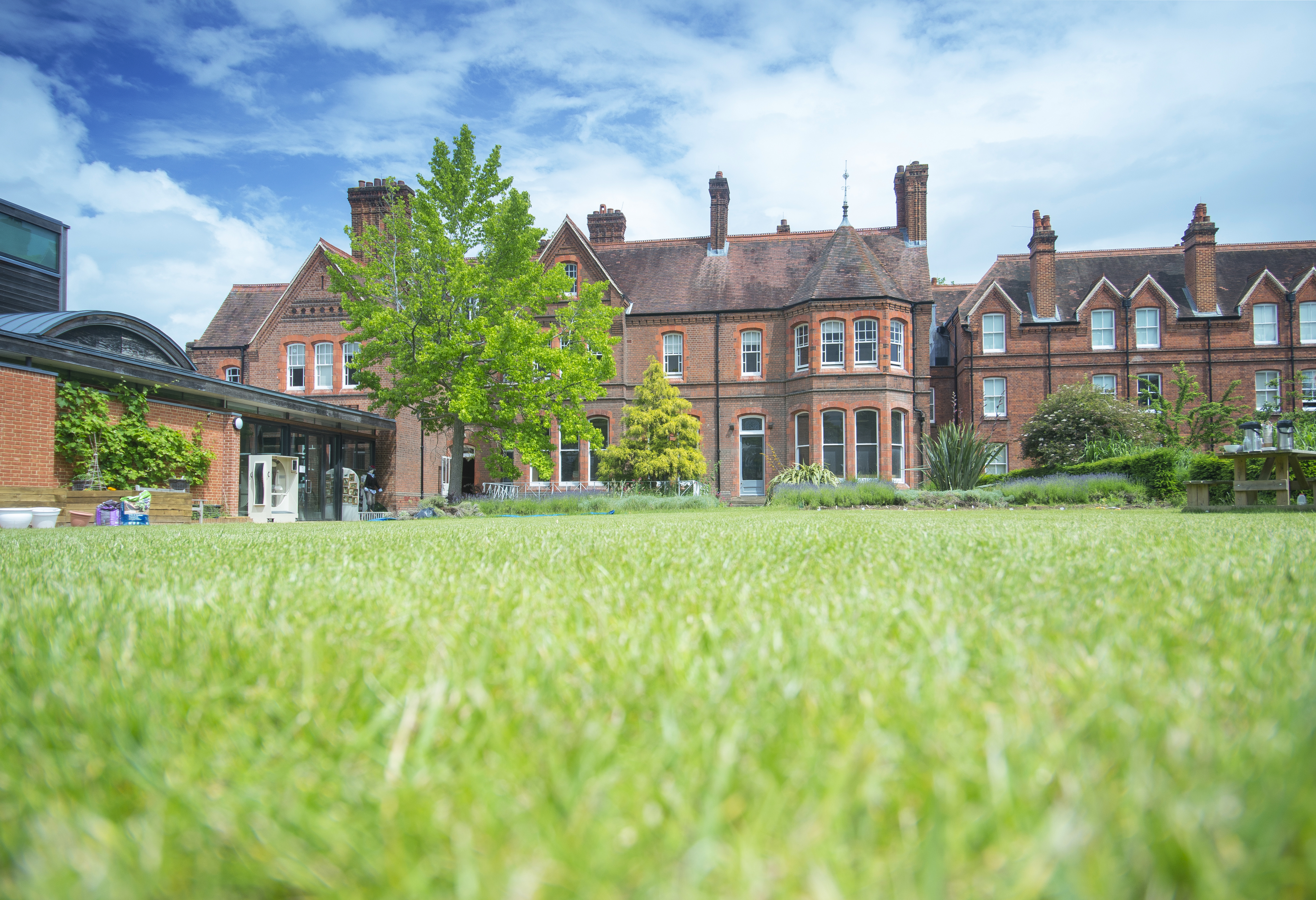
- The Museum of English Rural Life

- Location within Reading
- Established: 1951
- Location: Reading, Berkshire, England
- Coordinates: 51.44868°N 0.96098°W
- Type: Agricultural museum
- Accreditation: Arts Council England; National Archives
- Website: merl.reading.ac.uk

The Museum of English Rural Life, also known as The MERL, is a museum, library and archive dedicated to recording the changing face of farming and the countryside in England. The museum site was formerly known as East Thorpe House and then St Andrew's Hall.

The museum is run by the University of Reading, and is situated in Redlands Road to the rear of the institution's London Road Campus near to the centre of the town of Reading in southern England. It is an accredited museum and accredited archive as recognised by Arts Council England and the National Archives.

== History ==
=== Previous history of the site ===
The museum's site was originally occupied by a house known as East Thorpe, designed in 1880 by Alfred Waterhouse for Alfred Palmer (of the Reading biscuit manufacturers Huntley & Palmers). Palmer was an important early benefactor of Reading University and in 1911 East Thorpe was extended to become St Andrew's Hall, a hall of residence for women attending the university.

St Andrew's Hall became the university's first mixed gender hall in 1969, and was further extended twice, in 1962/3 and 1973/4. It closed as a hall of residence in 2001. The site was then redeveloped for the use of the museum, with the cost of £11m being shared by the university, the Heritage Lottery Fund and public donations.

=== Previous history of the museum ===
The museum itself was founded in 1951, growing out of the university's long academic connections with agriculture. The founding objects of the museum came from the collections of H. J. Massingham and Lavinia Smith. It opened to the public in 1955, in premises off Chancellor's Way on the University of Reading's main Whiteknights Campus.

The museum's original buildings were demolished after the museum moved to Redlands Road, and their site is now occupied by the Construction Management and Engineering building.

=== The new museum ===
The new museum at Redlands Road opened in 2005 and retains the original East Thorpe building, with the addition of an adjoining new building. The two contrasting buildings overlook restored gardens, providing a setting for a rural collection in an urban environment.

The Museum underwent a period of further redevelopment from 2013–2016, funded by the Heritage Lottery Fund, the Wellcome Trust, and the University of Reading. The Museum officially reopened on 22 October 2016 with ten new galleries, including a gallery dedicated to Ladybird Books artwork held by the University of Reading Special Collections.

In February 2019, a bat was found on the museum's premises. The museum named the bat MERLin and issued him a library card. To mark their 70th year, the museum worked with artists and writers from different communities on 51 Voices, enabling responses to objects connected to 1951 in the collections.

== Collections ==
The Museum houses designated collections of national importance that span the full range of objects, archives, photographs, film and books. It is also the location of the University of Reading's special collections archive, housing hundreds of collections of rare books, manuscripts, typescripts and other objects of importance. The collections hold over 25,000 objects, almost all of which are on display, and which provide a material record of rural England covering 1750 to the present day. It cares for a collection of livestock portraiture, representations of rural life, agricultural hand tools, ploughs, farm machinery, sewing machines and other equipment.

The museum has a specialist library and houses other collections including the library of the Tools & Trades History Society.

== Social media ==
In 2018, the museum's Twitter account posted a tweet featuring the picture of a large ram and the caption "look at this absolute unit" which went viral. The tweet attracted the attention of Elon Musk, who then hired its creator, Adam Koszary, to work for Tesla as social media manager. The museum's Twitter account went on to have further viral tweets including a competition to find the best duck in other museums' archives and an account of a live bat being found in the archives.

== Gallery ==
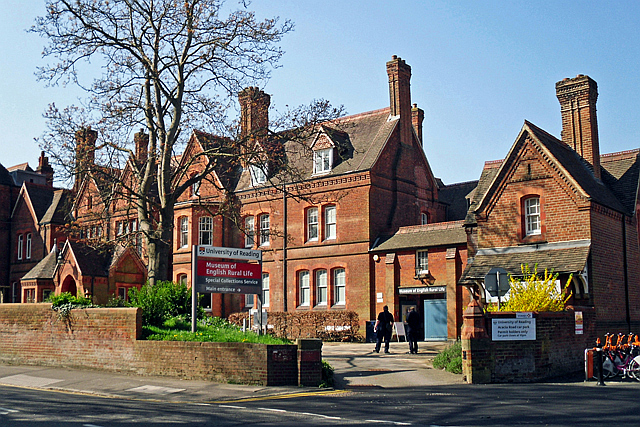
Entrance to the Museum

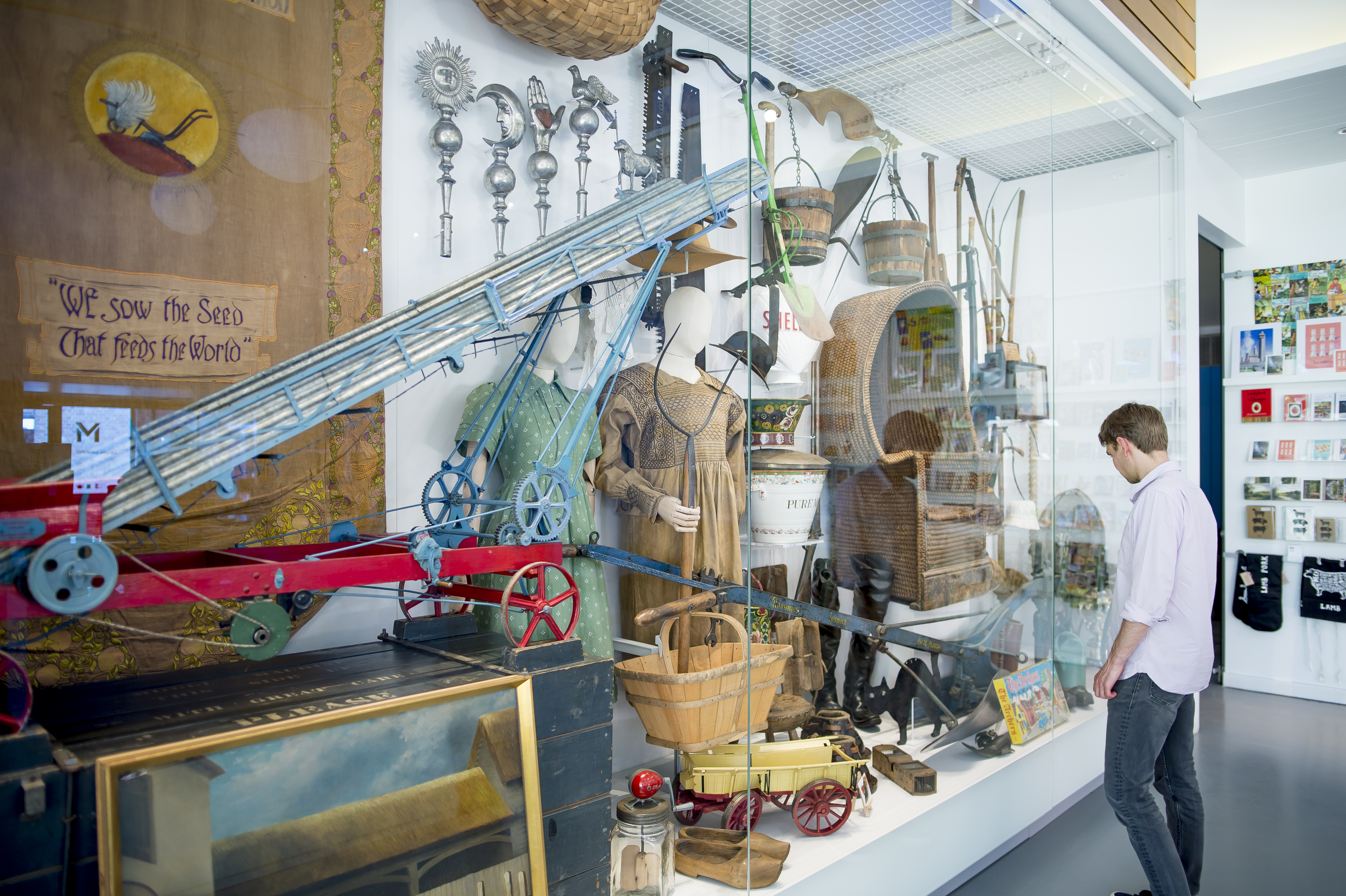
The Welcome Case

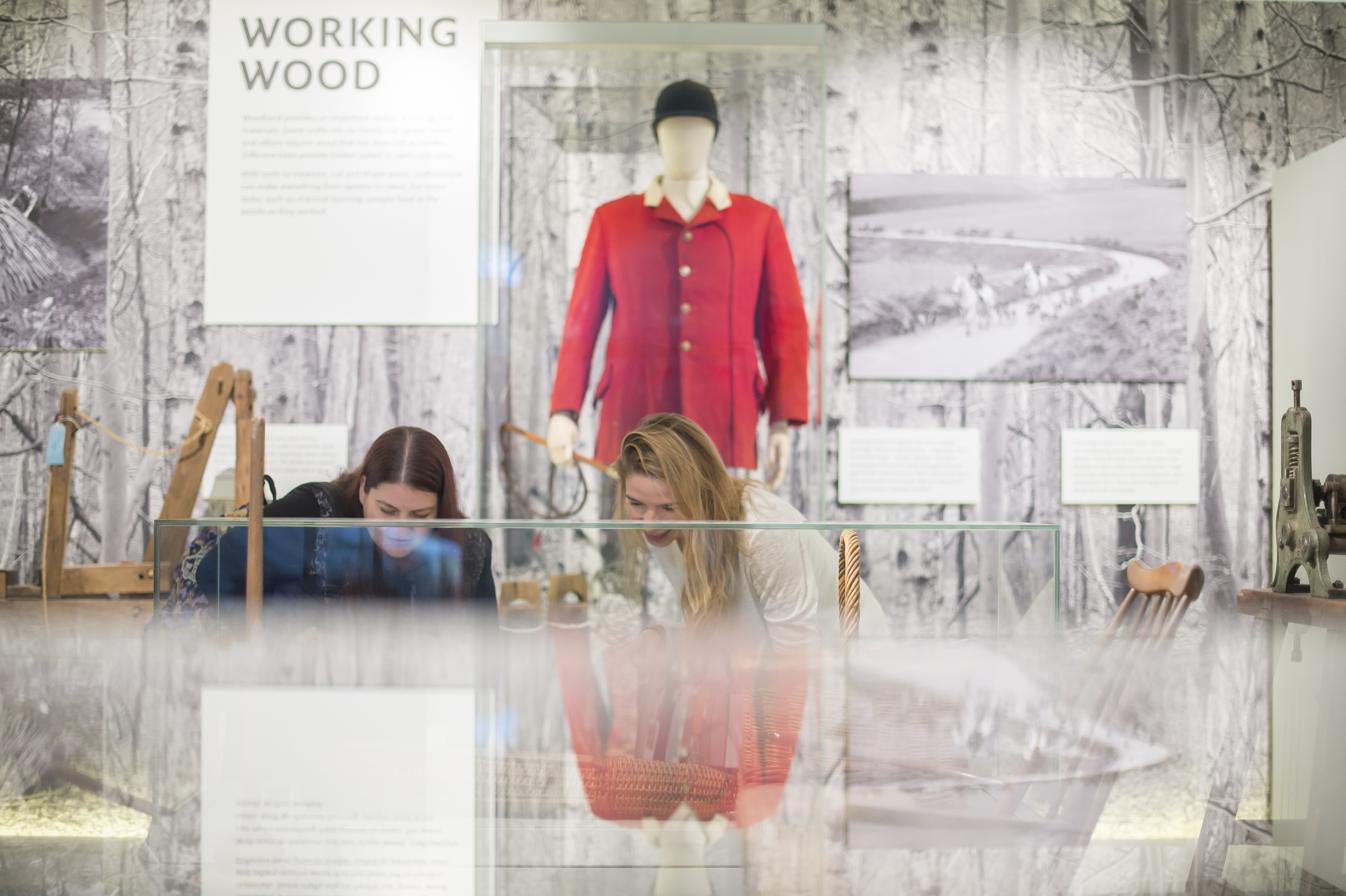
Detail of the Making Rural England Gallery

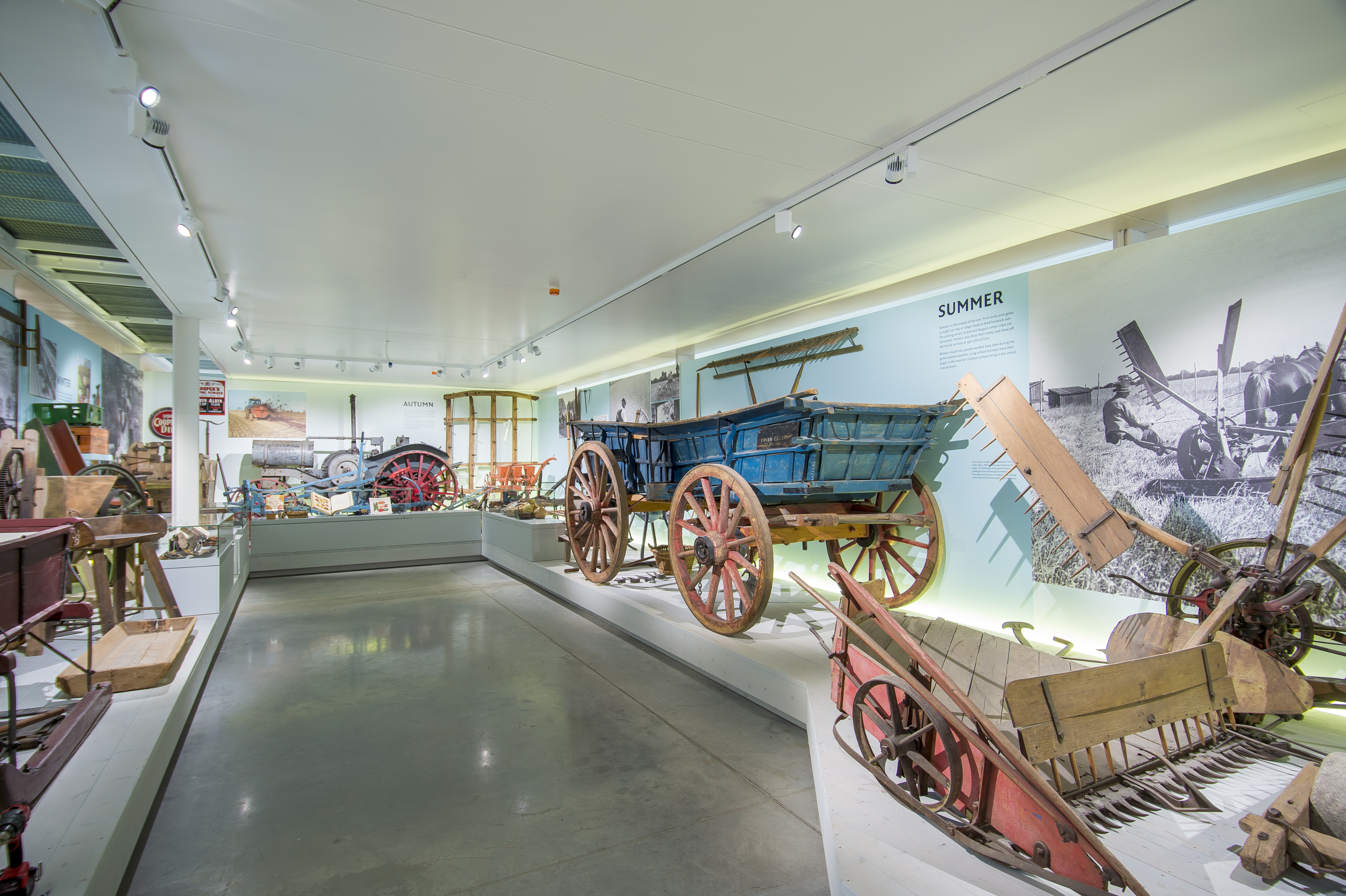
A Year on the Farm Gallery

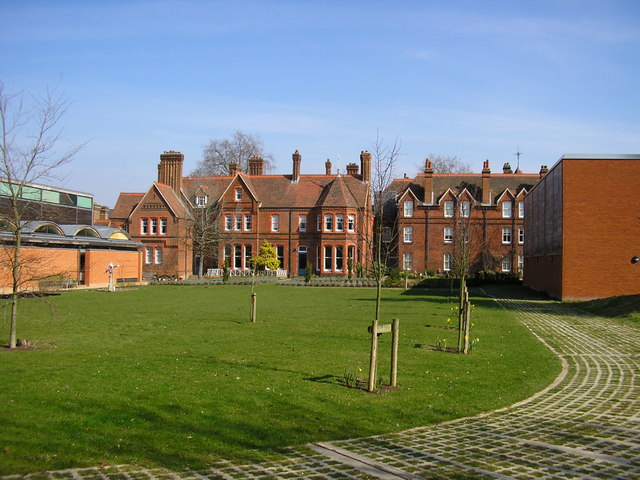
The rear garden, with the original East Thorpe House in the centre
