= Bernard Eyston =

Bernard Eyston, D.D. (1628–1709), was an English Franciscan friar, called in religion Bernard à Sancto Francisco.

Eyston was a younger son of William Eyston, esq., of East Hendred in Berkshire (now Oxfordshire), by Mary, daughter of James Thatcher, esq., of Priesthawes, in the parish of Westham in East Sussex. He was the cousin of Anthony Stapley, the regicide. He became lector of divinity at St. Bonaventure's Convent, Douay, where he died on 28 May 1709. He wrote 'The Christian Duty compared, being Discourses upon the Creed, Ten Commandments, and the Sacraments,’ Aire, 1684, 4to.

Another Franciscan named Eyston, whose Christian name has not been ascertained, was the author of 'A Clear Looking-glass for all Wandering Sinners,’ Rouen, 1654, 24mo, dedicated to Lady Willoughby.
