= East Hendred Brook =

Stream in Oxfordshire, England

Coordinates: 51.6491°N 1.2591°W

The East Hendred Brook is a small tributary of the River Thames which starts on the springline at the base of the Berkshire Downs, later becoming Ginge Brook and then Mill Brook, joining the Thames between Abingdon and Wallingford.
