= Champs Chapel Museum of East Hendred =

Local museum and former chapel in East Hendred, England

Coordinates: 51.5970°N 1.3366°W

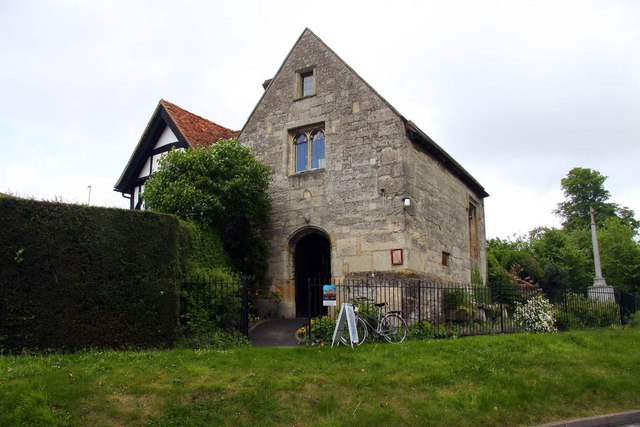
View of Champs Chapel Museum in East Hendred

The Champs Chapel Museum of East Hendred is a local village museum housed in the former Chapel of Jesus of Bethlehem, built in 1453 by Carthusian monks and now commonly called Champs Chapel, at East Hendred in the English county of Oxfordshire (formerly in Berkshire).

Exhibits in the museum trace more than a thousand years of the history of East Hendred, a history which is closely interwoven with that of Oxfordshire, Berkshire and England. The museum is open on Sunday afternoons (April to October) and upon request at other times. Admission is free. The museum is operated entirely by volunteers from local East Hendred Heritage Trust.

Some of the Museum collection has been digitised and accessible via eHive website.
