= East Hendred =

Village in Oxfordshire, England

Coordinates: 51.596°N 1.338°W

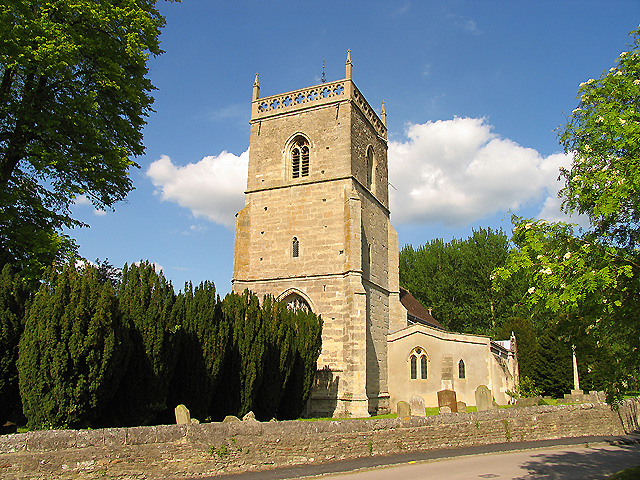
- St Augustine of Canterbury parish church

- Location within Oxfordshire
- Population: 1,092 (2001 census)
- OS grid reference: SU459887
- Civil parish: East Hendred
- District: Vale of White Horse
- Shire county: Oxfordshire
- Region: South East
- Country: England
- Sovereign state: United Kingdom
- Post town: Wantage
- Postcode district: OX12
- Dialling code: 01235
- Police: Thames Valley
- Fire: Oxfordshire
- Ambulance: South Central
- UK Parliament: Didcot and Wantage
- Website: East Hendred

East Hendred is a village and civil parish about 4 miles (6.4 km) east of Wantage in the Vale of White Horse and a similar distance west of Didcot. The village is on East Hendred Brook, which flows from the Berkshire Downs to join the River Thames at Sutton Courtenay. Historically in Berkshire, it has been administered as part of Oxfordshire, England, since the 1974 boundary changes. The westernmost parts of the Harwell Science and Innovation Campus are in the parish. The Ridgeway and Icknield Way pass through the parish. It was called "the most well connected village in Britain" because of its connections with the railway station in Didcot and the M4 motorway. Champs Chapel Museum of East Hendred is a small museum in a former 15th-century wayside chapel.

== History ==
Just over 2 miles (3 km) south of the village is Scutchamer Knob, the remains of an Iron Age long barrow. King Edwin of Northumbria is said to have killed Cwichelm of Wessex there in the 7th century. Scutchamer Knob was the meeting point of the shire moot in the Middle Ages. It is on the Ridgeway National Trail at the southern end of the village.

== Manors ==
The parish had five manors:

- King's Manor
- Abbey Manor, a grange of Reading Abbey.
- Frampton's Manor
- New College Manor
- Arches Manor. Hendred House is the manor house of Arches Manor. One of the local public houses is named after the Eyston family, current lords of the manor.

=== Arches Manor ===
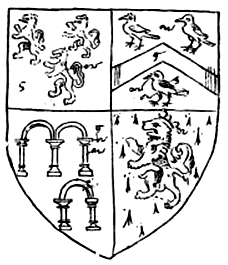
Arms of Eyston of East Hendred, as drawn in 1556 by William Harvey, Clarencieux King of Arms, showing quarterly, 1st: Eyston; 2nd: Stowe; 3rd: Arches; 4th: Turberville

The Heraldic visitation of Berkshire gives the descent of the Arches family, originally D'Arches, Latinised to de Arcubus. William Arches married Amyce Turberville, daughter and heiress of Richard Turberville esquire of East Hendred. His son was William Arches, followed by John Arches whose son Rawlin Arches left a daughter and heir Maud Arches. Maud married John Stowe of Burforde, Oxfordshire, and left a daughter and heiress Isabell Stowe, who married John Eyston, thus bringing the manor of Arches into that family.

John Arches (d. circa 1405) of Arches was elected four-times as MP for Berkshire, in 1384, 1390, 1402 and 1404. The feudal overlord of his lands at East Hendred was the Duke of Lancaster. From 1394 he held the office of alnager of Berkshire, and later of Oxfordshire also and served as bailiff of the liberty of the Bishopric of Winchester in the counties of Berkshire and Oxfordshire. He left at least two sons, Ralph Arches (born circa 1378) and Richard Arches, who attended New College, Oxford, Bishop of Winchester Wykeham's new foundation.

Another branch of the Arches family, bearing the same canting armorials of Gules, three arches argent, had been established in Buckinghamshire since at the latest 1309, and held the manors of Little Kimble, and in the parish of Waddesdon the manors of Eythrope and Cranwell. Richard Arches (d.1417) of Eythrope, was MP for Buckinghamshire in 1402. His eventual heir was John Dinham, 1st Baron Dinham (1433–1501), the son of his daughter and heiress Joan Arches.

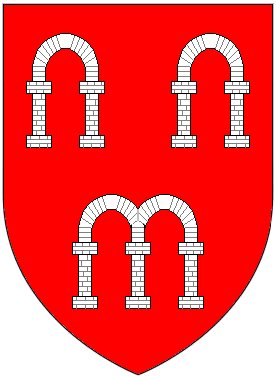
Canting arms of Arches of Arches, East Hendred, Berkshire and of Arches of Eythrope and Cranwell (in Waddesdon) and Little Kimble, Buckinghamshire: Gules, three arches argent

== Hendred House and the Eyston Family ==
The village is unusual in having a manor house, Hendred House, which has been held by a single family for over six hundred years. The Eyston family, heirs of the Arches, first acquired the property in the mid-15th century and remain lords of the manor to this day. The Eyston family were recusants who remained Roman Catholic following the English Reformation, and this has had a strong influence on the history and development of the village. The medieval chapel of Saint Amand, a private chapel attached to the manor house, remained in Catholic use during penal times and is still used for occasional services today. The family was also responsible for the building of St Mary's Church and the establishment of St Amand's School during the 19th century. Notable members of the Eyston family include Charles Eyston, a 17th-century antiquarian, and Captain George Eyston, who held the world land speed record during the 1930s.

== Anglican parish church ==
The Church of England parish church of Saint Augustine of Canterbury dates from late in the 12th century. It has a rare working example of a 16th-century faceless clock, which as well as chiming and striking plays the Angel's Hymn by Orlando Gibbons "four times a day, every three hours, starting at 09:00." John Seymour of Wantage made the clock in 1525 and it was extensively restored in 1961. It was restored again in 2024 by horologist Simon Gilchrist, who added automatic winding. The church has a Perpendicular Gothic square west tower, built in about 1450, displaying the put-log holes of its construction. The church is also home to a medieval lectern depicting a crusaders foot standing on a dragon's head. The Jacobean pulpit features carved heads of Charles I and Oliver Cromwell, and was made in commemoration of the ascension of Charles II. The tower has a ring of six bells, one of which is dedicated to Saint Anne and predates the English Reformation. There is a sundial on the south face of the tower.

David Cameron (British Prime Minister, 2010–2016), and Samantha Sheffield were married at the church in 1996.

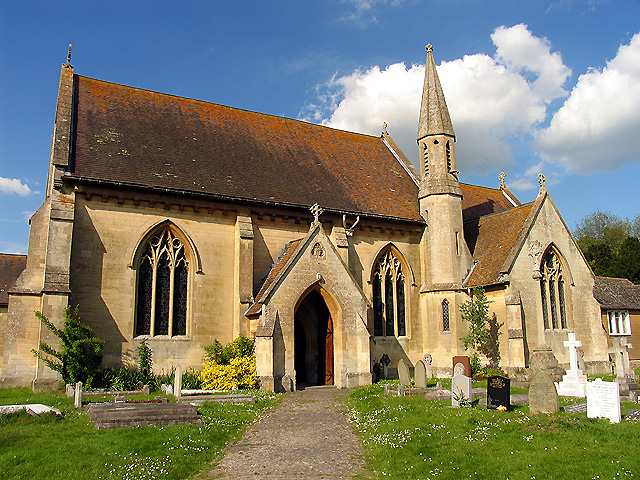
St Mary's Catholic church

== Amenities ==
East Hendred has two public houses: The Wheatsheaf, and the Eyston Arms. The Champs Chapel Museum of East Hendred houses artefacts, archives and photographs from the village's history. The museum's collection can be viewed online. Snells Hall, the village hall, a converted Church of England primary school, provides a venue for village organisations, a pre-school, private parties and other functions.

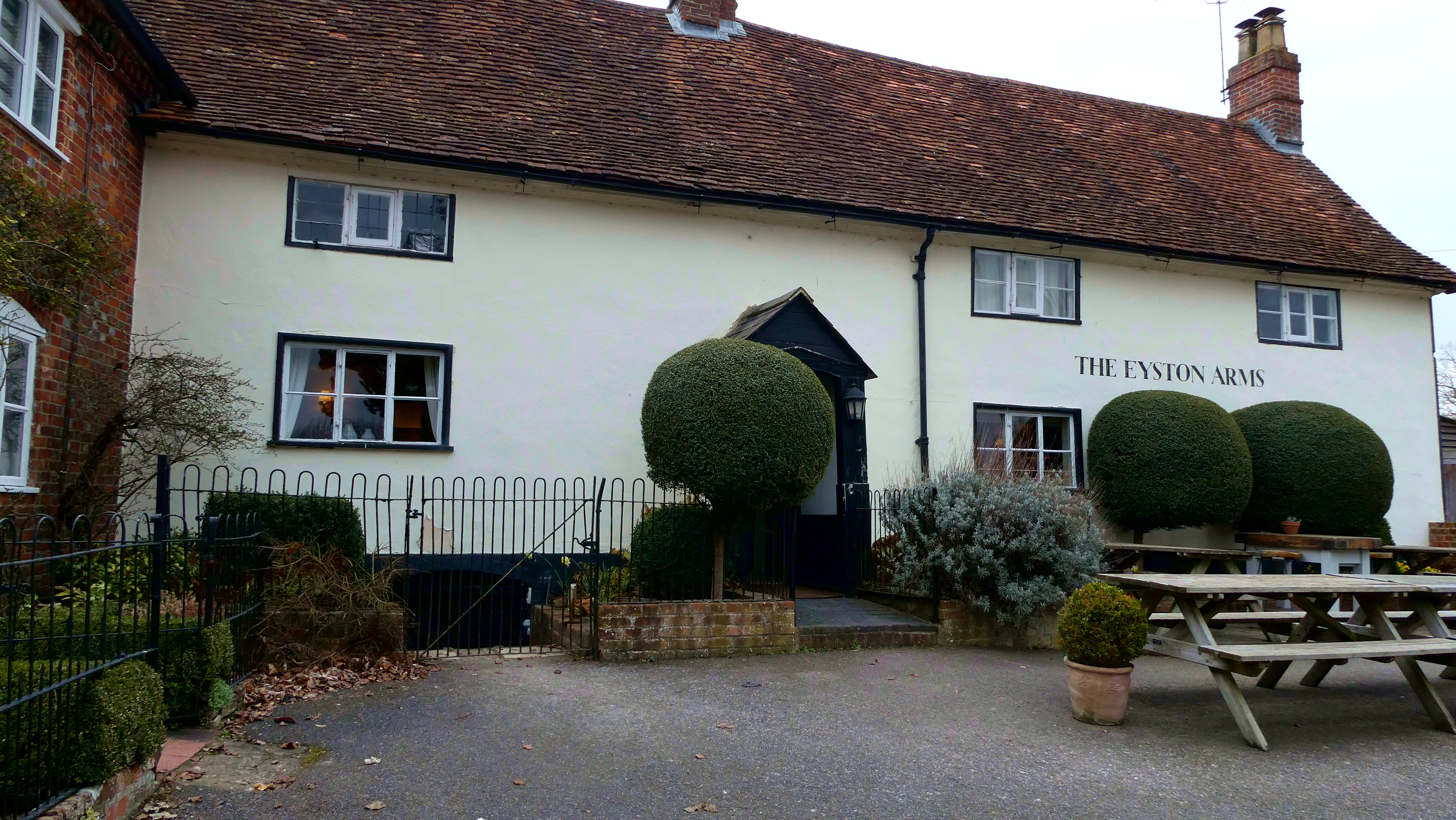
The public house named Eyston Arms

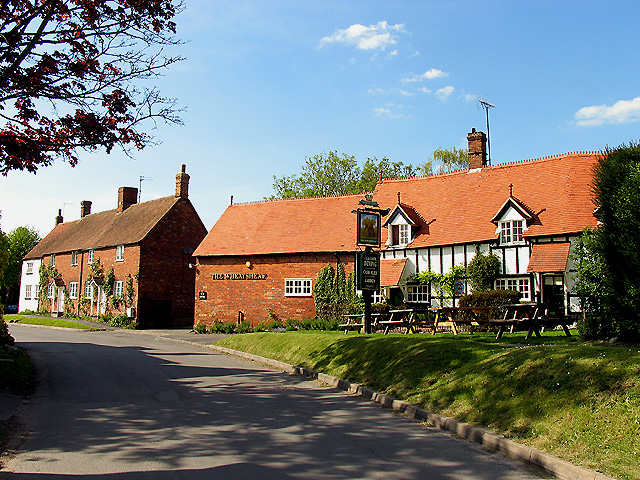
The Wheatsheaf public house

== Notable residents ==
- Roy Jenkins, Baron Jenkins of Hillhead – politician
- William Penney, Baron Penney – scientist
- Harry Colt – English golf course architect
- Lavinia Smith – British teacher and museum founder, rural life collector

== Town twinning ==
East Hendred is twinned with:

- Sarceaux, Orne – France.

== See also ==
- West Hendred
- List of stewards of the Manor of East Hendred

== Sources ==
- Addenbrook, M (1971). East Hendred: a brief guide. The Hendreds Society.
- Beeson, C.F.C. (1989) [1962]. Simcock, A.V (ed.). Clockmaking in Oxfordshire 1400–1850 (3rd ed.). Oxford: Museum of the History of Science. p. 20. ISBN 0-903364-06-9.
- Gibson, D, ed. (1982). A Parson in the Vale of White Horse: George Woodward's Letters from East Hendred 1753–1761. Alan Sutton Publishing.
- Manley, E.R. (1969). A Descriptive Account of East Hendred. privately published.
- Page, W.H.; Ditchfield, P.H., eds. (1924). A History of the County of Berkshire, Volume 4. Victoria County History. pp. 294–302.
- Pevsner, Nikolaus (1966). Berkshire. The Buildings of England. Harmondsworth: Penguin Books. pp. 133–134.
- "St Augustine of Canterbury East Hendred: A Brief Guide".
