= Charles Eyston =

Charles Eyston (22 September 1667 – 5 November 1721) was an English antiquary.

As a scholar he became a friend of Thomas Hearne, who wrote of him: "He was a Roman Catholick and so charitable to the poor that he is lamented by all who knew anything of him . ... He was a man of a sweet temper and was an excellent scholar and so modest that he did not care to have it at any time mentioned." (Reliq. Hearnianae).

== Works ==
- A little Monument to The Once Famous Abbey and Borough of Glastonbury, published by Thomas Hearne in his History and Antiquties of Glastonbury (Oxford, 1722); reprinted by Richard Warner in his History of the Abbey of Glaston and the town of Glastonbury (Bath, 1826).

There is in the library at Hendred an unpublished manuscript entitled A Poor Little Monument to All the Old Pious Dissolved Foundations of England: or a Short History of Abbeys, all sorts of Monasteries, Colleges, Chapels, Chantries, etc. Joseph Gillow corrects Charles Butler's error in ascribing to Eyston a History of the Reformation, published in 1685. Another manuscript mentioned under his name by Gillow was merely his property and not his work.

== Family ==
He was a member of an old Catholic family of East Hendred in Berkshire (now Oxfordshire), where he was both born and died. He was eldest son of George Eyston of Hendred House and his wife, Ann, daughter of Robert Dormer of Peterley. On the death of his father in 1691 he succeeded to the family estates, and in 1692 married Winefrid Dorothy, daughter of Basil Fitzherbert of Swinnerton, Staffordshire, by whom he had a large family of fours sons and seven daughters.

On his death he was succeeded by his son, Charles. Another of his sons, William George, joined the Jesuits, but left the Society soon afterwards. Several of his daughters became nuns.
