= Self Portrait (Junko Onishi album) =

Compilation album by Junko Onishi
- Released: Aplil 29, 1998
- Recorded: December 15, 1997
- Studios: Toshiba-EMI Studio, Tokyo
- Genre: Jazz
- Length: 59:21
- Labels: Somethin' Else (Toshiba EMI); TOCJ-8001
- Producer: Hitoshi Namekata

Junko Onishi chronology
Play, Piano, Play (1996)	Self Portrait (1998)	Fragile (1998)

Self Portrait is an album by Japanese pianist Junko Onishi, released on Aplil 29, 1998, in Japan.

== Track listing ==
No.	Title	Lyrics	Music	from album	Length
1.	"Eulogia II"	-	Junko Onishi	-	11:07
2.	"The House Of Blue Lights"	-	Gigi Gryce	Live at the Village Vanguard Vol. II	9:13
3.	"So Long Eric"	-	Charles Mingus	Live at the Village Vanguard	8:21
4.	"Caravan"	-	Duke Ellington、Juan Tizol	Crusin'	6:21
5.	"The Jungular"	-	Junko Onishi	WOW	7:08
6.	"Play, Piano, Play"	-	Erroll Garner	Play, Piano, Play	5:19
7.	"Portrait In Blue"	-	Junko Onishi	THE SEXTET	4:54
8.	"Take the "A" Train"	-	Duke Ellington	Piano Quintet Suite	6:58
Total length:					59:21

== Eulogia II personnel ==
- Junko Onishi – piano
- Yasushi Yonekii – bass
- Motohiko Hino – drums

== Production ==
- Recording and mixing engineer – Shunichi Kogai
- Cover photograph – Kunihiro Takuma
- Inner photograph – Kunihiro Takuma, Edouard Curchod, Norman Saito
