= Shigeharu Mukai J Quintet featuring Junko Onishi =

Studio album by Shigeharu Mukai, Junko Onishi
- Released: February 23, 1994
- Recorded: November December 25 & 26, 1993
- Studios: Woodstock Karuizawa Studio, Karuizawa (Japan)
- Genre: Jazz
- Length: 45:48
- Labels: somethin`else (Toshiba EMI); TOCJ-68041
- Producer: Shigeharu Mukai

Shigeharu Mukai chronology
Better Days of Shigeharu Mukai (1993)	Shigeharu Mukai J Quintet featuring Junko Onishi (1994)	Stance (1999)

Junko Onishi chronology
Fragile (1993)	Shigeharu Mukai J Quintet featuring Junko Onishi (1994)	Musical Moments (1994)

Shigeharu Mukai J Quintet featuring Junko Onishi is an album by Japanese jazz trombonist Shigeharu Mukai, released on April 28, 1999 on somethin`else (Toshiba EMI).

== Track listing ==
No.	Title	Lyrics	Music	Length
1.	"On Reflection"	-	Shigeharu Mukai	5:46
2.	"Spiritual Calling"	-	Shigeharu Mukai	5:00
3.	"Stretch Out"	-	Shigeharu Mukai	8:30
4.	"Serenity"	-	Joe Henderson	5:36
5.	"Woman Child"	-	Rodney Whitaker	4:47
6.	"Maldoror"	-	Mabumi Yamaguchi	9:35
7.	"Berlin"	-	Shigeharu Mukai	6:34
Total length:				45:48

== Personnel ==
- Shigeharu Mukai - trombone
- Mabumi Yamaguchi - Tenor saxophone
- Junko Onishi - Piano
- Rodney Whitaker - Bass
- Greg Hutchinson - Drums

== Production ==
- Co-producer - Shigeharu Mukai and Sentimental Family
- Executive Producer - Hitoshi Namekata
- Recording and Mixing Engineer - Masuzo Iida
- Assistant Engineer - Yoshiyuki Yokoyama, Hideki Kodera, Taizo Sugihara
  Recorded on November 25 & 26, 1993 at Woodstock Karuizawa Studio
  Mixed on December 5, 1993 at Toshiba EMI Studios 3, Tokyo
- Mastering engineer - Yoshio Okazaki
- Frontcover photograph - Rice Yoneda
- Backcover photograph - Fumiaki Fujimoto
- Art director - Kaoru Taku
- A&R - Yoshiko Tsuge
- Liner notes - Fumiaki Fujimoto

== Release history ==
Region	Date	Label	Format	Catalog	Note
Japan	February 23, 1994	Toshiba EMI	12cmCD	TOCJ-68041	
Japan	April 1, 2004	EMI Music Japan	Digital download	727551644	iTunes Store
Japan	April 1, 2004	EMI Music Japan	Digital download	A1000106384	RecoChoku
Japan	April 1, 2004	EMI Music Japan	Digital download	B0046B8MKY	Amazon.co.jp mp3
Japan	April 1, 2004	EMI Music Japan	Digital download	8d6kgx6k6rh6	MSN Music mp3
Japan	July 10, 2013	EMI Music Japan	Digital download	00094631430855	mora AAC-LC 320 kbit/s
