= Cool Woods =

Studio album by Phil Woods, Junko Onishi
- Released: April 28, 1999
- Recorded: January 4–5, 1999
- Studios: Right Track Studios, New York City
- Genre: Jazz
- Length: 53:57
- Labels: Somethin' Else (Toshiba EMI); TOCJ-68041
- Producer: Bill Goodwin

Phil Woods chronology
| The Rev and I (1998) | Cool Woods (1999) | Phil Woods In Italy 2000, Chapter 1 (2000) |

Junko Onishi chronology
| Fragile (1998) | Cool Woods (1999) | Musical Moments (2009) |

Professional ratings
Review scores
| Source | Rating |
|---|---|
| Allmusic | 3.5/5 stars |

Cool Woods is a studio album by the jazz alto saxophonist Phil Woods. It was released in 1999 by Somethin' Else (Toshiba EMI).

== Track listing ==
| No. | Title | Lyrics | Music | Length |
|---|---|---|---|---|
| 1. | "Lullaby Of The Leaves" | Joe Young | Bernice Petkere | 7:37 |
| 2. | "All the Things You Are" | Oscar Hammerstein II | Jerome Kern | 7:42 |
| 3. | "'Round Midnight" | - | Thelonious Monk | 7:40 |
| 4. | "You Don't Know What Love Is" | Don Raye | Gene de Paul | 7:29 |
| 5. | "Embraceable You" | Ira Gershwin | George Gershwin | 5:26 |
| 6. | "Samba du Bois" | - | Phil Woods | 5:24 |
| 7. | "What Are You Doing the Rest of Your Life?" | Alan Bergman, Marilyn Bergman | Michel Legrand | 7:57 |
| Total length: | | | | 53:57 |

== Personnel ==
- Junko Onishi – piano
- Ron Carter – bass
- Bill Goodwin – drums
- Phil Woods – alto saxophone

== Production ==
- Producer - Bill Goodwin
- Executive Producer - Hitoshi Namekata
- Recording and Mixing Engineer - Kurt Lundvall
- Assistant Engineer - Jasm Stasium
  Digital Recorded at Right Track Studios, New York on January 4 & 5, 1999
- Mixing Engineer - Jim Anderson
  Mixed at Aviator Studios, New York on January 19, 1999
- Mastering engineer - Alan Tucker, Yoshio Okazaki
  Mastered at Foothill Digital New York on January 21, 1999 and Toshiba-EMI Studio Terra, Tokyo on February 20, 1999
- Photograph - Takehiko Tokiwa
- Art director - Yuri Tamura
- A&R - Yoshiko Tsuge
- Liner notes - Yasukuni Terashima

== Release history ==
| Region | Date | Label | Format | Catalog | Note |
|---|---|---|---|---|---|
| Japan | April 28, 1999 | Toshiba EMI | 12cmCD | TOCJ-68041 | |
| Japan | September 18, 2013 | Universal Music Japan | 12cmCD | TOCJ-95035 | 24bit mastering, SHM-CD |
| Japan | August 8, 2018 | Universal Music Japan | 12cmCD | UCCQ-9379 | 24bit mastering, SHM-CD |
