= Hat Trick (Jackie McLean album) =

Studio album by Jackie McLean, Junko Onishi
- Released: May 22, 1996
- Recorded: January 28–31, 1996
- Studios: Power Station, New York City (United States)
- Genre: Jazz
- Length: 53:57
- Labels: somethin`else (Toshiba EMI); TOCJ-5581
- Producer: Hitoshi Namekata

Jackie McLean chronology
Rhythm of the Earth (1992)	Hat Trick (1996)	Fire and Love (1997)

Junko Onishi chronology
Piano Quintet Suite (1995)	Hat Trick (1996)	Play, Piano, Play (1996)

Professional ratings
Review scores
Source	Rating
AllMusic	4/5 stars

Jackie McLean meets Junko Onishi Hat Trick is an album by American jazz alto saxophonist Jackie McLean, released in May 1996 on somethin`else (Toshiba EMI).

== Track listing ==
No.	Title	Lyrics	Music	Length
1.	"Little Melonae"	-	Jackie McLean	6:53
2.	"A Cottage For Sale"	Larry Conley	Willard Robison	7:42
3.	"Solar"	-	Miles Davis	7:48
4.	"Bags' Groove"	-	Milt Jackson	4:33
5.	"Will You Still Be Mine?"	Tom Adair	Matt Dennis	5:26
6.	"Left Alone"	Billie Holiday	Mal Waldron	5:47
7.	"Jackie's Hat"	-	Junko Onishi	4:59
8.	"Sentimental Journey"	Bud Green	Les Brown, Ben Homer	6:02
9.	"Bluesnik"	-	Jackie McLean	4:47
Total length:				53:57

== Personnel ==
- Jackie McLean – alto saxophone
- Junko Onishi – piano
- Nat Reeves – bass
- Lewis Nash – drums

== Production ==
- Executive Producer - Hitoshi Namekata
- Co-Producer - Jackie McLean
- Recording and Mixing Engineer - Jim Anderson
- Assistant Engineer - Barbara Lipke
- Mastering engineer - Yoshio Okazaki
- Cover Photograph - Jimmy Katz
- Art director - Kaoru Taku
- A&R - Yoshiko Tsuge
