= Baroque (Junko Onishi album) =

Studio album by Junko Onishi
- Released: July 18, 2010
- Recorded: March 24–29, 2010
- Studio: Sear Sound, New York City
- Genre: Jazz
- Length: 74:46
- Label: Verve; UCCJ-2081
- Producer: Junko Onishi, Kuninori Tamamori

Junko Onishi chronology
| Musical Moments (2009) | Baroque (2010) | Tea Times (2016) |

Baroque is an album by the jazz pianist Junko Onishi, recorded and released in 2010.

== Reception ==
Professional ratings
Review scores
| Source | Rating |
|---|---|
| AllMusic | Not rated |

Matt Collar of Allmusic says, "Baroque features several Onishi originals as well as her unique interpretations of some 20th century classical pieces, including 'The Three Penny Opera.'"

== Track listing ==
| No. | Title | Music | Length |
|---|---|---|---|
| 1. | "Tutti" | Junko Onishi | 9:05 |
| 2. | "The Mother's (Where Johnny Is)" | Junko Onishi | 5:49 |
| 3. | "The Threepenny Opera" | Junko Onishi | 19:41 |
| 4. | "Stardust" | Hoagy Carmichael | 3:23 |
| 5. | "Meditations for a Pair of Wire Cutters" | Charles Mingus | 4:54 |
| 6. | "Flamingo" | Edmund Anderson, Ted Grouya | 5:10 |
| 7. | "The Street Beat / 52nd Street Theme" | Charlie Parker / Sir Charles Thompson, Thelonious Monk | 8:35 |
| 8. | "Memories of You" | Eubie Blake, Andy Razaf | 8:35 |
| Total length: | | | 74:46 |

== Personnel ==
- Junko Onishi - piano
- Nicholas Payton - trumpet
- Wycliffe Gordon - trombone
- James Carter - Tenor sax, alto sax, bass clarinet, flute
- Reginald Veal - bass (on 1-3, 5-7)
- Rodney Whitaker - bass (on 1, 3, 5, 7)
- Herlin Riley - drums
- Roland Guerrero - congas

== Production ==
- Producer - Junko Onishi, Kuninori Tamamori
- Executive producer - Kimitaka Kato, Kazutoshi Chiba, Hiroko Kawachi
- Recording and mixing engineer - Jim Anderson
- Assistant engineer - Ted Tuthill
- Mastering engineer - Alan Silverman
- Photographer - Mika Ninagawa
- Art direction - Takuya Yamada
- Stylist - Takuto Satoyama
- Coordination - Kayoko "Coco" Seo, Kiyoko Murata
- Management - Kuninori Tamamori, Nao Sekine
- A&R - Yoshihisa Saito

== Release history ==
| Region | Date | Label | Format | Catalog |
|---|---|---|---|---|
| Japan | July 28, 2010 | Verve Universal Music LLC | CD | UCCJ-2081 |
| Europe | August 25, 2010 | Verve Universal Music Group | CD | JZ100825-17 |
