= Sam Newsome =

American jazz musician (born 1965)

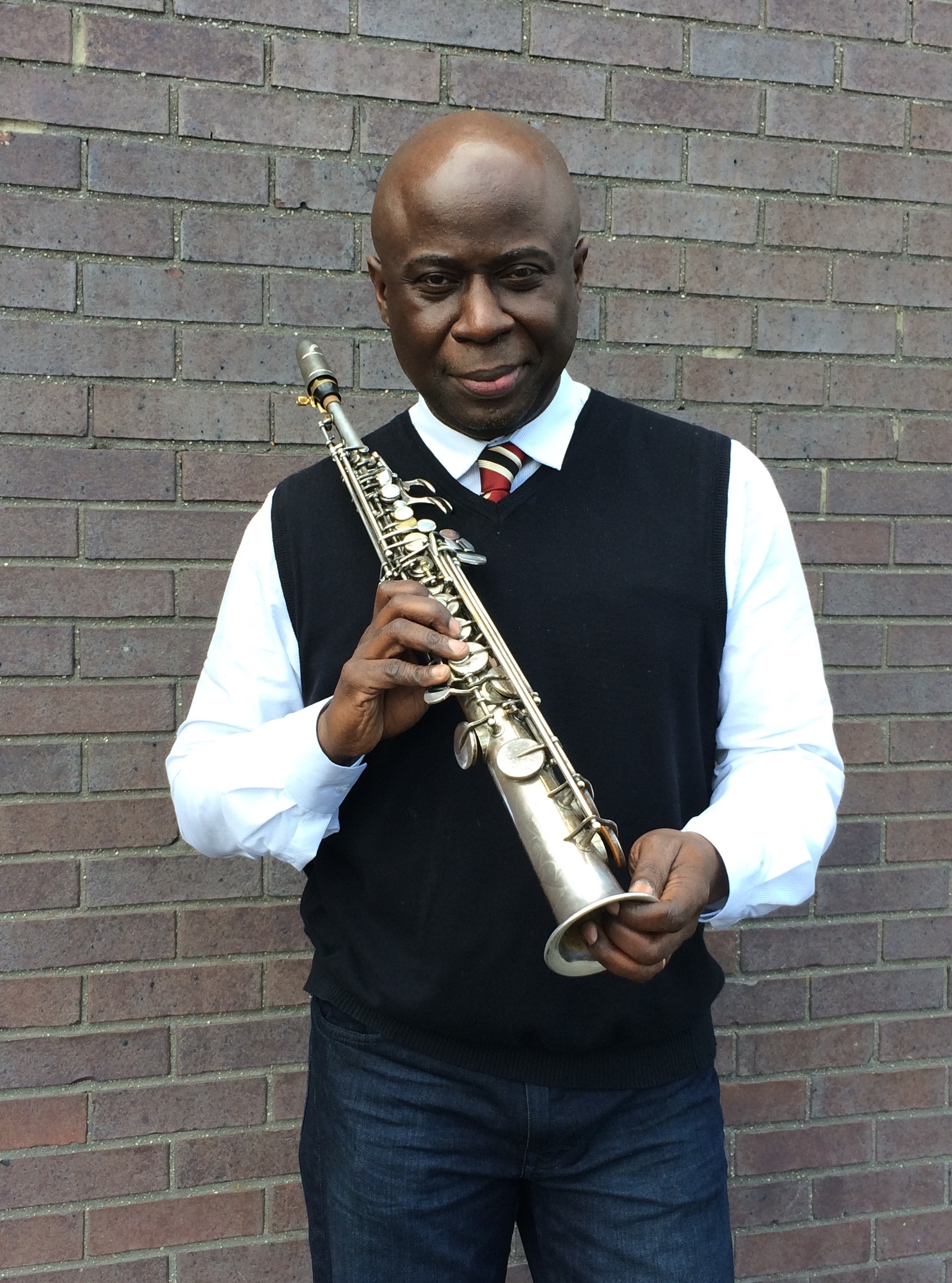

Background information
- Born: April 28, 1965 (age 61); Hampton, Virginia, U.S.
- Genres: Jazz, world music, experimental
- Occupations: Musician, teacher
- Instrument: Saxophone
- Years active: 1989–present
- Labels: Columbia/Sony, Palmetto, Criss Cross, SteepleChase, Some New Music
- Website: www.sopranosaxtalk.blogspot.com

Sam Newsome (born April 28, 1965) is an American jazz saxophonist, composer, and educator. His music combines straight-ahead jazz, world music (drawing influences from North Africa and East Asia) and experimental jazz, which uses extended techniques. Newsome is an associate professor of music and the coordinator of the music program at LIU Brooklyn, Long Island University's Brooklyn campus.

== Biography ==
=== Early life ===
Newsome was born in Salisbury, Maryland and began playing the alto saxophone at age nine. His family moved to Hampton, Virginia years later while he was in elementary school. At age 13, Newsome switched to the tenor saxophone when he joined his junior high school jazz ensemble. While in high school, he played in a garage band called Fantasy One with classmate bassist James Genus. Saxophonist Steve Wilson, who was a former member of the group, taught Newsome jazz theory after school while in high school.

=== Education ===
He studied Jazz Composition & Arranging at the Berklee College of Music from 1983 to 1987 under Bill Pierce, George Garzone, Andy McGhee, and Hal Crook. Some of his classmates were Javon Jackson, Danilo Perez, Delfeayo Marsalis, Mark Turner, Julian Joseph and Donny McCaslin.

=== Career ===
Recommended by composer/pianist Donald Brown—his former jazz ensemble teacher while at Berklee—he toured Europe with trumpeter Donald Byrd during the summer of 1988. Other members on Byrd's quintet were bassist Ron McWorter, and drummer Billy Kilson. Newsome settled in New York City during the fall of 1988.

Newsome, while leading his group at the after hours jam session at the Blue Note caught the attention of trumpeter Terence Blanchard. He was asked to join Blanchard's band and performed with the quintet from 1989 to 1994 recording several CDs on (Columbia/Sony) including Terence Blanchard, Simply Stated, and The Malcolm X Jazz Suite. Other members of Blanchard's quintet were pianist Bruce Barth, bassist Rodney Whitaker (and later Tarus Mateen) and drummer Troy Davis. His debut recording as a leader, Sam I Am, appeared in 1990.

In 1995 Newsome decided to concentrate exclusively on soprano saxophone. He formed Motivic Development, a jazz/world music trio with bassist Yosuke Inoue, drummer Matt Wilson, and later adding percussionist Joao Vincent Lewis.

In 1996, Newsome reconfigured his ensemble and added vocalist Elisabeth Kontomanou, bassist Ugonna Okewgo, oudist Amos Hoffman, percussionists Natalie Cushman and Gilad, renaming it Sam Newsome & Global Unity—music he termed as cross-cultural jazz. The group drew influences from late '60s Coltrane, North Africa, Japan, and the Middle East. During this period he also worked regularly in the bands of drummer/percussionist Leon Parker and bassist Avishai Cohen—both of whom were also exploring this musical direction. The group's debut CD was released on Columbia/Sony in 1999.

In 2005, Newsome began focusing on solo saxophone performance. After seven years with Global Unity, Newsome took hiatus from performing as a leader. In 2007, he released Monk Abstractions, on which he recorded the compositions of Thelonious Monk. Mark Corroto from All About Jazz wrote: “Newsome expands the sound of a single soprano saxophone into a one man band.” All About Jazz - New York named it one of the top tribute CDs of the year. In 2010, Newsome released his second solo saxophone CD, the blues-based Blue Soliloquy. which received five stars in Downbeat magazine. Subsequent solo recordings include The Art of the Soprano, Vol. 1 (2012), Sam Newsome Plays Monk and Ellington (2013), The Straight Horn of Africa: A Path to Liberation - The Art of the Soprano, Vol. 2 (2014), Sopranoville: New Works for Prepared and Non-Prepared Saxophone (2017),Magic Circle (2018), and Chaos Theory: Song Cycles for Prepared Saxophone (2019)

In addition to his solo recordings and performances, Newsome has collaborated with saxophonist David Liebman, drummer Andrew Cyrille, pianists Ethan Iverson and Jean-Michel Pilc. Newsome also plays regularly as a member of Francisco Mora Catlett's AfroHorn, The Bad Plus: Science Fiction, Fay Victor's SoundNoise and On the Quiet Side, and Meg Okura's Pan Asian Chamber Jazz Ensemble.

== Personal life ==
Newsome is married to jazz violinist Meg Okura. They were married on September 18, 2004.

A fan of stand-up comedy, Newsome often attended "open-mic night" at many new venues in the early nineties to practice some of his own stand-up routine. Some of the comedians who often attended those same sessions were Dave Atell, Adam Carolla, and Reggie McFadden.

Newsome is also an amateur balloon twister. This is a hobby he took up soon after the birth of his daughter Naomi.

== Discography ==
=== As a leader ===
- Sam I Am with Billy Drummond, James Genus, Mulgrew Miller, Steve Nelson (vibraphonist), 1990
- Sam Newsome & Global Unity, Elisabeth Kontomanou, Amos Hoffman, Ugonna Okegwo, Gilad, Leon Parker, Natalie Cushman, Carlos Gomez, 1997
- The Tender Side of Sammy Straighthorn, Elisabeth Kontomanou, Bruce Barth, Ugonna Okegwo, Matt Wilson, 2000
- This Masquerade with Bruce Barth, Gene Jackson, Ugonna Okegwo, 2000
- Global Unity with Elisabeth Kontomanou, Meg Okura, Ugonna Okegwo, Matt Balitsaris, Jeff Berman, Adam Cruz, Gilad, Kahlil Kwame Bell, 2001
- Sam Newsome's Groove Project 24/7 with Jerome Harris, Greg Lewis, Derrick Phillips, 2002
- Monk Abstractions: Solo Works for Soprano Saxophone, solo, 2007
- Sam Newsome & Lucian Ban, The Romanian-American Jazz Suite with Alex Harding, Sorin Romanescu, Arthur Barlough, and Willard Dyson, 2008
- Blue Soliloquy: Solo Works for Soprano Saxophone, solo, 2009
- The Art of the Soprano, Vol. 1, solo, 2012
- Sam Newsome Plays Monk and Ellington, solo, 2013
- The Straighthorn of Africa: A Path to Liberation - The Art of the Soprano, Vol. 2, solo, 2014
- Sopranoville: New Works for Prepared and Non-Prepared Soprano, solo, 2017
- Magic Circle, with Jean-Michel Pilc, 2018
- Chaos Theory: Song Cycles for Prepared Saxophone, solo, 2019

=== As a sideman ===
With Bruce Barth

- East & West, 2000
- Where Eagles Fly, 2000

With Terence Blanchard

- Terence Blanchard, 1991
- Simply Stated, 1993
- The Malcolm X Jazz Suite, 1994
- Sugarhill, Original Soundcheck, 1995

With David Berkman

- Communication Theory, 2000
- Leaving Home, 2002

With Orrin Evans

- Grown Folk Bizness, 1999
- Listen to the Band, 2000
- Meant to Shine, 2002
- The Band, Live at Widener University, 2005

With Elisabeth Kontomanou

- Embrace, 2001
- Waiting to Exhale, 2004
- Black Angel, 2007

With Leon Parker

- Awakening, 1998
- The Simple Life, 2000

With Various Artists

- (Russell Gunn) Young Gunn, 1994
- (Sugarhill) Original Soundcheck, 1994
- (Donald Brown) Wurd on the Street, 1996
- (Paul Swartz and Mario Grigorov), Aria, 1997
- (Pablo Bobrowicky), South of the Border, 1997
- (Lisa Michel), When Summer Comes, 1999
- (Various Artists),32 More Gems From 32 Jazz, 2000
- (Rene Marie) I Can't Stop Singing, 2001
- (Various Artists), Palmetto Records, 2001
- (Various Artists) SteepleChase Jam Session, Vol. 4, 2002
- (Various Artists) Celebrating 20 Years of the Festival International de Jazz de Montreal: 1980–2000, 2002
- (Jean Michel Pilc) Cardinal Points, 2003
- (Shoko Nagai) Vortex, 2003
- (Ugonna Okegwo) UONIVERSE, 2004
- (Cafe del Mar) Aria, 2004
- (Various Artists) Time Works For Dreamers, 2004
- (Various Artists) Imani Records Sampler, 2005
- (DD Jackson) Serenity Song, 2006
- (Scott Neumann and Osage County) Scott Neumann and Osage County, 2006
- (Richard Thompson/Mirage) Swing Low, Sweet Chariot, 200
- (Matt Smiley & Ron Coulter) Free Wyoming (SN Trio: Live at the Metro Coffee Co.), 2020
- (SeFa LoCo) (Bret Sexton, Farrell Lowe, Matt Smiley, Ron Coulter) flourish, 2023 Kreating SounD
- (SeFa LoCo) (Bret Sexton, Farrell Lowe, Matt Smiley, Ron Coulter) esoteria, 2023 Right Brain Records,
- (Matt Smiley & Ron Coulter) Media is the context for the exchange of content, 2023 Kreating SounD
- (SeFa LoCo) (Bret Sexton, Farrell Lowe, Matt Smiley, Ron Coulter) STRATA, 2026 Right Brain Records
