= The Glamorous Life (disambiguation) =

"The Glamorous Life" is a 1984 song written by Prince, recorded by Sheila E.

The Glamorous Life may also refer to:

- The Glamorous Life (album), an album by Sheila E.
- The Glamorous Life (Desperate Housewives), an episode of the television series Desperate Housewives
- Glamorous Life (album), a 2017 album by Junko Onishi
- "The Glamorous Life", a song by Stephen Sondheim from the musical A Little Night Music
