= Gerard Edery =

Moroccan-born American singer and guitarist

- Born: Casablanca, Morocco
- Genres: Sephardic music, Ladino music, World music, Folk music
- Occupations: Singer, guitarist, composer, educator
- Instruments: Vocals; Guitar
- Years active: 1970s–present
- Label: Sefarad Records
- Website: gerardedery.com

Gerard Edery is a Moroccan-born American singer, guitarist and recording artist recognized for his work in Sephardic music and Ladino song preservation. Born in Casablanca and raised in Paris and New York City, he is considered a leading musical folklorist specializing in the music of the Sephardic Diaspora.

== Early life and education ==
Edery was born in Casablanca of Judeo-Spanish heritage on his mother's side and Judeo-Berber on his father's side. His family moved to Paris when he was four years old, and later to New York City when he was eight. He graduated from the Manhattan School of Music with Bachelor's and Master's degrees in operatic performance.

== Career ==
Following his graduation, Edery sang more than thirty roles with opera companies throughout the United States as a bass-baritone, developing a vocal technique in the Italian operatic tradition. He performed with companies including the New York Lyric Opera, Des Moines Metro Opera and Boston Opera.

A turning point in Edery's career occurred in 1992, when the Jewish community commemorated the 500th anniversary of the expulsion of Jews from Spain. Following this, he dedicated himself to studying, recording, and performing Judeo-Sephardic music. In 1991, he founded Sefarad Records, a record label that produces recordings and live concerts of ethnic folk music. He has released numerous albums exploring Sephardic, Middle Eastern, and Latin American musical traditions.

Edery's performance career includes appearances at venues such as Carnegie Hall's Zankel Hall, Alice Tully Hall, Lincoln Center, the United Nations in New York and Geneva, the Smithsonian Institution, and international festivals including the Fez International Festival of Sacred Music in Morocco, Festival Cervantino in Mexico, and folk festivals in Vilnius and Warsaw. He frequently performs with the Gerard Edery Ensemble, which has included collaborators such as soprano Nell Snaidas, oud virtuoso George Mgrdichian, violinist Meg Okura, and percussionist Rex Benincasa.

He has developed several signature concert programs, including Spirit of Sepharad: From Casbah to Caliphate, exploring cultural influences on Sephardic and Mizrahi Jews; Two Faiths, One Voice (with singer Maria Krupoves), tracing Sephardic music from Medieval Spain to Eastern Europe; and Edery Sings Yupanqui, a tribute to Argentine folk musician Atahualpa Yupanqui.

Edery has served as faculty at the Manhattan School of Music, American Institute of Guitar and Hebrew Arts School. He has provided educational programs for Carnegie Hall's Musical Explorers series, the 92nd Street Y, the Metropolitan Museum of Art and the Center for Jewish History. He created the Ladino Song Project, an online database offering Ladino lyrics with English translations, making this repertoire accessible to students, researchers and performers. He also published The Gerard Edery Sephardic Songbook, containing 40 songs from the Sephardic oral tradition. Edery has received the Sephardic Musical Heritage Award and a Meet the Composer grant for his original songs.

== Discography (selected) ==
- Love Songs of the Sephardim (1997)
- Chansons d'Amour (1998)
- Linda Amiga (1999)
- Morena (1999)
- Oigo (2000)
- Sing to the Eternal (2002)
- Romanzas Sefarditas (2002)
- Guitar Give Me Your Song (2002)
- Amid the Jasmine (2006)
- Two Faiths, One Voice (2008)
- Dai de Cenar (2009)
- Shiru Hakadosh (2012)
- Edery Sings Yupanqui (2012)
