= Left Alone (song) =

Song by Mal Waldron
- Composer(s): Mal Waldron
- Lyricist(s): Billie Holiday

"Left Alone" is a jazz song written by singer Billie Holiday and pianist/composer Mal Waldron, and published by E.B. Marks.

== Background ==
This is one of seven songs written by or co-written by Holiday that she never recorded. According to Waldron, Holiday "came up with the lyrics and sang them to him on a cross-country flight; when the plane landed the song was done."

Mal Waldron began working as pianist for Holiday in mid-1953. Holiday had intended to record the song a number of times but "always forget the damned sheet music." However, Waldron himself recorded the song on his 1959 album Left Alone, and near the end of the LP discusses the origin of the song.

== Recordings ==
Waldron frequently performed the song for albums, often with tenor saxophonist Jackie McLean (who also played on the Left Alone album). Versions are included in Mal: Live 4 to 1 (1971), Like Old Times (1976), Left Alone '86 (1986), Into the Light (1989), My Dear Family (1993), and Left Alone Revisited (2002).

Other jazz performers who've recorded the song include:

- Abbey Lincoln – Straight Ahead (with Waldron on piano, 1961)
- Johnny Griffin – White Gardenia (1961).
- Jeanne Lee and Ran Blake – The Newest Sound Around (1962)
- Eric Dolphy and Booker Little – Far Cry (1962)
- Kimiko Kasai – One For Lady (with Waldron on piano, 1971)
- Archie Shepp and Dollar Brand – Duet (1978)
- Abraham Burton – Closest to the Sun (1994)
- Jackie McLean and Junko Onishi – Hat Trick (1996)
- Steve Kuhn – Plays Standards (2009)
- Tsuyoshi Yamamoto – Gentle Blues (2013)
- Jane Ira Bloom - Sixteen Sunsets (2013)

An instrumental version of the song appeared on Joe Satriani's Time Machine in 1993. The Satriani version, titled "All Alone", was released as a single, reached No. 21 on Billboard's Mainstream Rock chart and received a nomination for Best Rock Instrumental Performance at the 1995 Grammy Awards.
