= Andy McGhee =

American saxophonist and educator (1927-1917)

- Born: November 3, 1927; Wilmington, North Carolina, U.S.
- Died: October 12, 2017 (aged 89) Atlanta, Georgia, U.S.
- Genres: Jazz
- Occupations: Musician, educator
- Instrument: Saxophone
- Years active: 1950s–2017
- Formerly of: Lionel Hampton

Andy McGhee (November 3, 1927 – October 12, 2017) was a tenor saxophonist and educator.

== Career ==
McGhee graduated from New England Conservatory in 1949 and worked for a short time with trumpeter Roy Eldridge and starting in 1953, with local Boston musician Fat Man Robinson, an alto saxophonist and vocalist who performed in the "jump blues" style of Louis Jordan and Eddie "Cleanhead" Vinson. Robinson's quintet and septet lineups included Oscar Dunham on trumpet, Sam Rivers on tenor saxophone, Bill Tanner on bass, and Charlie Cox on piano. Briefly in 1952, trombonist J.C. Higginbotham was a member. The group recorded for the Decca, Regent, and Motif record labels and performed at the Knickerbocker Cafe, the Hi-Hat, and Wally's Paradise, among other venues in Boston.

McGhee was quoted as saying, "Fat Man worked all the time. I was with him for four or five years with no time off at all."

After marrying in 1950, he served in the Army in Korea and at Fort Dix, New Jersey where he played in an Army band and gave lessons to other musicians. From 1957–1963 he worked in Lionel Hampton's band, touring the United States, Europe, and the Far East. His composition "McGhee" can be found on The Many Sides of Lionel Hampton. McGhee worked with Woody Herman from 1963 to 1966.

McGhee joined the faculty of Berklee College of Music in 1966. Among his students were saxophonists Bill Pierce, Javon Jackson, Donald Harrison, Antonio Hart, Sam Newsome, Richie Cole, Greg Osby, and Ralph Moore. While devoting his time to teaching, McGhee wrote the instruction books Improvisation for Saxophone: The Scale/Mode Approach, Improvisation for Flute: The Scale/Mode Approach and Modal Studies for Saxophone.

On March 15, 1978, he performed with Lionel Hampton and the Lionel Hampton Alumni Band as part of the Boston Globe Jazz Festival. The band included Bob Wilber, clarinet, Ernie Wilkins, saxophones, Teddy Wilson, piano, Alan Dawson and Terri Lynne Carrington, drums and Hampton on vibraphone. The performance marked the 50th anniversary of the start of Lionel Hampton's career as a professional musician.

In the early 1990s, McGhee toured with Lionel Hampton as member of the Golden Men of Jazz tour. The band featured Harry "Sweets" Edison, Clark Terry, Benny Bailey, Al Grey, and Benny Golson. The Golden Men of Jazz played concerts throughout Europe and on returning to the United States played for President George H. W. Bush in Washington, D.C.

In May 2006, McGhee was awarded an Honorary Doctorate of Music from Berklee College of Music.

== Discography ==
=== As leader ===
- Could it Be (Mags, 1992)

=== As sideman ===
With Lionel Hampton

- Hamp's Big Band (Audio Fidelity, 1959)
- Golden Vibes (Columbia, 1959)
- The Many Sides of Hamp (Glad-Hamp, 1961)
- The Exciting Hamp in Europe (Glad-Hamp, 1962)
- Live! (Glad-Hamp 1979)

With Woody Herman

- My Kind of Broadway (Columbia, 1964)
- The Swinging Herman Herd-Recorded Live (Philips, 1964)
- Woody's Winners (Columbia, 1965)
- Woody's Big Band Goodies (Philips, 1965)
- The Jazz Swinger (Columbia, 1966)
- Woody Live East and West (Columbia, 1967)
- Live in Antibes 1965 (France's Concert, 1988)

== Publications ==
- Improvisation for Saxophone: the scale/mode approach, Berklee Press Publications, 1974 (May 21, 2009), ISBN 0-7935-5426-8
- Improvisation for Flute: the scale/mode approach, Berklee Press Publications, 1974 (May 21, 2009), ISBN 1-4234-6740-X
- Modal Studies for Saxophone: A Scale/Mode Approach, Berklee Press Publications, 1981, ASIN B000F3PTOO
