= Very Special (Junko Onishi album) =

Studio album by Junko Onishi
- Released: November 15, 2017
- Recorded: January 17, 2011 & September 6, 2017 & September 7–9, 2017
- Studios: Crescent Studio & Sound City Setagaya & Sound City A-studio Tokyo
- Genre: Jazz
- Length: 1:00:51
- Labels: Taboo (Village Records); VRCL-18853
- Producer: Naruyoshi Kikuchi

Junko Onishi chronology
Tea Times (2016)	Very Special (2017)	Glamorous Life (2017)

Very Special is an album by the jazz pianist Junko Onishi, recorded and released in 2017.

== Track listing ==
No.	Title	Lyrics	Music	Length
1.	"Very Special -Intro-"		Junko Onishi	1:29
2.	"I Cover The Water Front"		Johnny Green	5:53
3.	"Lush Life"		Billy Strayhorn	3:25
4.	"Easy To Love"		Cole Porter	5:58
5.	"Barcarolle (from The Seasons)"		Pyotr Ilyich Tchaikovsky	4:17
6.	"Willow Song (from Otello)"		Giuseppe Verdi	9:45
7.	"Começar De Novo (The Island)"		Ivan Lins	5:09
8.	"A Flower Is A Lovesome Thing"		Billy Strayhorn	2:49
9.	"How Do You Keep The Music Playing"	–	Michel Legrand	4:41
10.	"After The Love Has Gone"		David Foster, Jay Graydon, Bill Champlin	4:52
11.	"Very Special -Outro-"		Junko Onishi	1:52
Total length:				60:51

== Personnel ==
- Junko Onishi – Piano, Fender Rhodes (C5, C9)
- Takayoshi Baba – Guitar (C2, C4, C7, C9, C10)
- José James – Vocal (C3, C8)
- Miho Hazama – Arranger and conductor (C6)
- Takuya Mori – Clarinet (C6)
- Yoshie Sato – Bass clarinet (C6)
- Shinnosuke Takahashi – Cymbals (C1)
- Yousuke Inoue – Bass (C11)

== Production ==
- Producer – Junko Onishi
- Co-Producer – Hitoshi Namekata (Names Inc.), Ryoko Sakamoto (disunion)
- Recording and mixing engineer – Shinya Matsushita (STUDIO Dede)
  Recorded at Sound City A-studio September 7–9, 2107 and Sound City Setagaya September 6, except C3 & C8 at Crescent Studio on January 17, 2011.
- Assistant engineer – Taiyo Nakayama (Sound City)
- Mastering engineer – Akihito Yoshikawa (STUDIO Dede)
- Cover photo – Haruyuki Shirai, Tetsuya Kurahara
- Art direction – Takuma Hojo
- Hair and Make-up Artist – Naoki Katagiri (EFFECTOR), Mari Watanabe (fuwa fuwa) for Ginjiro
- Stylist – Yuka Kikuchi

== Release history ==
Region	Date	Label	Format	Catalog	memo
Japan	November 15, 2017	SOMETHIN'COOL	12cmCD	SCOL-1024	STEREO
Japan	November 15, 2017	SOMETHIN'COOL	Digital download	4538182726891	mora AAC-LC 320kbps
Japan	November 15, 2017	SOMETHIN'COOL	Digital download	4538182726907	mora FLAC 96.0 kHz/24bit
Japan	November 15, 2017	SOMETHIN'COOL	Digital download	B07763M76G	Amazon.com
Japan	November 15, 2017	SOMETHIN'COOL	Digital download	1308856336	iTunes Store
Japan	November 15, 2017	SOMETHIN'COOL	Digital download	Bt4ifpwy7fqdmoxgigawfhmfyai	Google Play Music
Japan	November 15, 2017	SOMETHIN'COOL	Digital download	2fdbOfkqNhpzMrLHxFXNs5	Spotify
Japan	December 20, 2017	SOMETHIN'COOL	30cmLP	SCOL-1024	STEREO
