= Cruisin' (Junko Onishi album) =

Studio album by Junko Onishi
- Released: July 21, 1993
- Recorded: April 21–22, 1993
- Studio: Power Station, New York City
- Genre: Jazz
- Length: 61:37
- Label: Somethin' Else (Toshiba EMI); TOCJ-5555
- Producer: Hitoshi Namekata

Junko Onishi chronology
| WOW (1993) | Cruisin' (1993) | Live at the Village Vanguard (1994) |

Professional ratings
Review scores
| Source | Rating |
|---|---|
| AllMusic | 4.5/5 stars |

Cruisin' is the second leader album by Japanese pianist Junko Onishi, released on July 21, 1993, in Japan. It was released on April 5, 1994, by Blue Note Records.

== Track listing ==
| No. | Title | Lyrics | Music | Length |
|---|---|---|---|---|
| 1. | "Eulogia" | - | Junko Onishi | 8:58 |
| 2. | "The Shepherd" | - | Duke Ellington | 6:03 |
| 3. | "Summertime" | DuBose Heyward | George Gershwin | 7:50 |
| 4. | "Congeniality" | - | Ornette Coleman | 11:15 |
| 5. | "Melancholia" | - | Duke Ellington | 2:32 |
| 6. | "Caravan" | Irving Mills | Juan Tizol | 6:21 |
| 7. | "Roz" | - | Rodney Whitaker | 7:58 |
| 8. | "Switchin' In" | - | Junko Onishi | 3:31 |
| 9. | "Blue 7" | - | Sonny Rollins | 7:09 |

== Personnel ==
- Junko Onishi – Piano
- Rodney Whitaker – Bass
- Billy Higgins – Drums

== Production ==
- Executive Producer – Hitoshi Namekata
- Co-Producer – Junko Onishi
- Recording and Mixing Engineer – Jim Anderson
- Assistant Engineer – Victor Deyglio
- Mastering engineer – Yoshio Okazuki
- Cover Photograph – Kunihiro Takuma
- Inner Photograph – William Claxton, David Tan
- Art director – Kaoru Taku
- A&R – Yoshiko Tsuge
