= Terence Blanchard (album) =

Studio album by Terence Blanchard
- Released: June 18, 1991
- Studio: BMG, NYC
- Genre: Jazz
- Length: 57:02
- Label: Columbia 468388 2
- Producer: Delfeayo Marsalis

Terence Blanchard chronology
Black Pearl (1988)	Terence Blanchard (1991)	Simply Stated (1992)

Terence Blanchard is an album by American jazz trumpeter Terence Blanchard. This is his debut full-length album as a leader. The record was released on June 18, 1991, via Columbia Records.

== Reception ==
Professional ratings
Review scores
Source	Rating
AllMusic	3/5 stars
The Encyclopedia of Popular Music	3/5 stars
Los Angeles Times	3/4 stars
The Rolling Stone Jazz & Blues Album Guide	3/5 stars
The Virgin Encyclopedia of Jazz	3/5 stars

Scott Yanow of AllMusic stated, "On the varied program, Blanchard opens and closes the set with a hymn ("Motherless Child" and "Amazing Grace"), performs four originals and comes up with personal interpretations of three standards... By the time this recording came out in 1992, Blanchard was ready to take his place as one of the trumpet giants of the '90s". Leonard Feather of Los Angeles Times commented "Trumpeter Blanchard brings new elements and an often invigorating lineup to his first album since he worked on the Spike Lee film Mo' Better Blues as arranger, trumpeter and trumpet instructor for actor Denzel Washington. There are four Blanchard originals, of which the hyperventilating "Wandering Wonder" and the hectic "Azania" are a little too effusive—the latter has an overlong drum solo. But "Tomorrow's Just a Luxury," with its easy canter, and the solemn "Sing Soweto" reveal a strong compositional talent".

== Track listing ==
No.	Title	Writer(s)	Length
1.	"Motherless Child"	Traditional	0:46
2.	"Wandering Wonder"	Blanchard	5:40
3.	"Tomorrow's Just a Luxury"	Blanchard	5:48
4.	"Goodbye"	Gordon Jenkins	11:51
5.	"Au Privave"	Charlie Parker	5:42
6.	"Sing Soweto"	Blanchard	4:02
7.	"I'm Getting Sentimental over You"	Ned Washington, George Bassman	8:01
8.	"Azania"	Blanchard	13:20
9.	"Amazing Grace"	John Newton	1:51
Total length:			57:02

== Personnel ==
Band

- Terence Blanchard – trumpet
- Branford Marsalis – tenor saxophone (tracks: 2 3 8)
- Sam Newsome – tenor saxophone (tracks: 5 7 9)
- Rodney Whitaker – double bass
- Jeff Watts – drums (tracks: 2 3 4)
- Troy Davis – drums (tracks: 5 6 7 9)
- Bruce Barth – piano

Production

- Dr. George Butler – executive producer
- Delfeayo Marsalis – producer, liner notes
- Bernie Grundman – mastering

== Chart performance ==
Chart (1991)	Peak position
US Traditional Jazz Albums (Billboard)	5
