= Pan Asian Chamber Jazz Ensemble =

Pan Asian Chamber Jazz Ensemble is a world chamber jazz ensemble based in New York City, founded in 2006 by jazz violinist and composer, Meg Okura.

== Discography ==
- Meg Okura's Pan Asian Chamber Jazz Ensemble (2006)
- Naima (2010)
- Music of Ryuichi Sakamoto (2013)

== Awards and honors ==
- 2006 Best New Age Album, Independent Music Awards
- 2006 Metlife Creative Connections Grant, Meet the Composer
- 2007–2008 American Composers Forum, Jerome Composers Commissioning Program
- 2008 Manhattan Community Art Fund, LMCC
- 2008 Metlife Creative Connections Grant, Meet the Composer
- 2013 & 2015 Manhattan Community Arts Fund, Lower Manhattan Cultural Council
- 2014 New Music USA Project Grant, New Music US, Urban Artist Initiative/New York

== Reception ==
"PACJE (Meg Okura & the Pan Asian Chamber Jazz Ensemble) have no peer in melding classical and jazz within an ethnically informed chamber setting."

—Elliot Simon, The New York City Jazz Record

"...breathtaking...shivers of emotion down the spine...flawless technique...Okura has established herself as a complete musician and a major one."

—Raul d'Gama Rose, All About Jazz

"Meg has created what surely must someday become a Jazz standard. Meg Okura has given a stunning reintroduction to the music from the genius of Ryuichi Sakamoto."

—Travis Rogers, Jazz Times

"...(Meg Okura) is equally comfortable playing classical chamber music, rock and everything in between."

—Stephen Holden, The New York Times

"...a stunning improvisation on top of an impressionistic backdrop."

—Bill Milkowski, Jazz Times

"...chamber jazz has found its queen in Meg Okura."

—Dan Bilawsky, All About Jazz

"Naima is the magnificent new release from violin virtuoso Meg Okura and the Pan Asian Chamber Jazz Ensemble. Captivating, exciting and refreshing are just one way to describe the track offerings that are featured. Aptly named after one of John Coltrane's famous compositions, Naima is marvelously diverse mixing the past, present and future."

—Esther Cailens, Birmingham Times

"Okura has made a bold statement with Naima, ensuring her place among the top names playing chamber jazz."

—Jon Neudorf, Sea of Tranquility

"Meg Okura offers a clear sense of vision of her world of music. Okura's Naima goes to many places, speaks in many voices, and is often rich with surprises and admirable in its aspirations."

—Mark Hayes, EJazz News

"Ms. Okura's vibrant, Eastern-influenced, jazzy score and the playing of her musicians were the most sophisticated parts of the work"

—Roslyn Sulcas, The New York Times

"...(some of) the best jazz New York has to offer."

—Elliot Simon, All About Jazz

"...mixes a classically trained mastery of strings, piano and drums with quick-witted compositional twist performed with high energy."

—Jennifer Odell, Down Beat magazine

"The group delivers exactly what its name promises...the group found a common ground in '60s-style modality, occasionally reminiscent of John Coltrane and McCoy Tyner's Eastern explorations."

—Will Friedwald, The New York Sun

"...elegantly intertwine(s) elements of classical, jazz and world folk into a new sound...by presenting precisely played ethnically inspired original compositions in an exciting modern jazz context."

—Elliot Simon, All About Jazz
