= Simply Stated =

Studio album by Terence Blanchard
- Released: May 5, 1992
- Studio: BMG, NYC
- Genre: Jazz
- Length: 1:02:42
- Label: Columbia CK 48903
- Producer: Terence Blanchard

Terence Blanchard chronology
Terence Blanchard (1991)	Simply Stated (1992)	The Malcolm X Jazz Suite (1993)

Simply Stated is a studio album by American jazz trumpeter Terence Blanchard. The album was released by Columbia Records on May 5, 1992.

== Background ==
Simply Stated marked Blanchard's second album as a band leader. Blanchard explained that the album is a tribute to Miles Davis. The album contains four famous jazz standards and four Blanchard's original compositions. The reached the top 10 on the Billboard traditional jazz charts.

== Critical reception ==
Professional ratings
Review scores
Source	Rating
AllMusic	2.5/5 stars
The Encyclopedia of Popular Music	3/5 stars
The Rolling Stone Jazz & Blues Album Guide	3.5/5 stars
The Virgin Encyclopedia of Jazz	3/5 stars

Nick Deriso of Something Else wrote, "This record was, Blanchard told me, his love letter to Miles Davis. In retrospect, it was the beginning of his ascension from young lion into modern standard bearer, too... Simply Stated, pleasant if never really triumphant, is centered by sharp if respectful renditions of a challenging Davis-associated number 'Dear Old Stockholm' and then on 'Sleepy Time Down South'. Blanchard, working his way back from a problem with his embouchure, even then blended enough artistry to draw second glances. As perhaps overly careful as this album sometimes was, it actually marked the starting point in a series of giant steps for Blanchard as an artist."

Scott Yanow of AllMusic wrote, "Terence Blanchard is in top form throughout this highly enjoyable outing... The music is tied to the hard bop tradition yet is quite fresh and open to more modern influences. Recommended."

== Track listing ==
No.	Title	Writer(s)	Length
1.	"Lil' Fawdy"	Blanchard	5:25
2.	"Central Focus"	Blanchard	4:33
3.	"Simply Stated"	Blanchard	8:20
4.	"Dear Old Stockholm"	Stan Getz	9:59
5.	"Little Miss Olivia Ray"	Blanchard	2:27
6.	"Glass J/Mo' Better Blues/Lonely Woman"		11:23
7.	"Detour Ahead"	Lou Carter, Herb Ellis, John Frigo	11:42
8.	"When It's Sleepy Time Down South"	Clarence Muse, Otis Rene, Leon René	8:34
Total length:			1:02:42

== Personnel ==
- Antonio Hart – alto saxophone (track three)
- Rodney Whitaker – double bass
- Billy Kilson – drums (track seven)
- Troy Davis – cymbals, drums
- Dr. George Butler – executive producer
- Bruce Barth – piano
- Terence Blanchard – producer, trumpet, piano (solo) (track five)
- Sam Newsome – tenor saxophone

== Chart performance ==
Chart (1992)	Peak position
US Traditional Jazz Albums (Billboard)	10
