= Live at the Village Vanguard (Junko Onishi album) =

Live album by Junko Onishi
- Released: September 21, 1994
- Recorded: May 6–8, 1994
- Venue: The Village Vanguard, New York City
- Genre: Jazz
- Length: 55:33
- Label: Somethin' Else (Toshiba EMI); TOCJ-5570
- Producer: Hitoshi Namekata

Junko Onishi chronology
Cruisin' (1993)	Live at the Village Vanguard (1994)	Live at the Village Vanguard, Vol II (1995)

Live at the Village Vanguard was the third album by Japanese pianist Junko Onishi, released on September 21, 1994, in Japan. It was released on May 2, 1995, by Blue Note Records.

This album was the first live recording of a Japanese jazz musician at the Village Vanguard.

== Reception ==
Professional ratings
Review scores
Source	Rating
Allmusic	4.5/5 stars

The Allmusic review by Scott Yanow stated, " This is a memorable set. When pianist Junko Onishi performs songs from the likes of Charles Mingus ("So Long Eric"), John Lewis ("Concorde"), and Ornette Coleman ("Congeniality"), she interprets each of the tunes as much as possible within the intent and style of its composer. "So Long Eric," although performed by her trio, gives one the impression at times that several horns are soloing together; in addition, polyrhythms are utilized part of the time, Ornette's "Congeniality" has a strong pulse but fairly free improvising, while "Concorde" sounds both distinguished and full of blues feeling, like John Lewis himself. Onishi's exploration of "Blue Skies" uplifts the warhorse through the use of colorful vamps and an altered melody, she takes the slow ballad "Darn That Dream" as a medium-tempo stomp, and her original, "How Long Has This Been Goin' On," is brooding but not downbeat and swings hard without losing its serious nature. There is not a weak selection in the bunch and the interplay between Onishi, bassist Reginald Veal, and drummer Herlin Riley is quite impressive.".

== Track listing ==
No.	Title	Lyrics	Music	Length
1.	"So Long Eric"	-	Charles Mingus	8:27
2.	"Blue Skies"	-	Irving Berlin	9:16
3.	"Concorde"	-	John Lewis	6:32
4.	"How Long Has This Been Goin' On?"	-	Junko Onishi	10:45
5.	"Darn That Dream"	Eddie DeLange	Jimmy Van Heusen	6:31
6.	"Congeniality"	-	Ornette Coleman	14:02

== Personnel ==
- Junko Onishi - Piano
- Reginald Veal - Bass
- Herlin Riley - Drums

== Production ==
- Executive Producer - Hitoshi Namekata
- Co-Producer - Junko Onishi
- Recording and Mixing Engineer - Jim Anderson
- Assistant Engineer - Brian Kingman, James Biggs, Mark Shane
- Mixing Engineer - Masuzo Iida
- Mastering engineer - Yoshio Okazuki
- Cover Photograph - Norman Saito
- Art director - Kaoru Taku
- A&R - Yoshiko Tsuge
