= Live at the Village Vanguard Vol. II (Junko Onishi album) =

Live at the Village Vanguard, Vol. II

Live album by Junko Onishi
- Released: February 22, 1995
- Recorded: May 6–8, 1994
- Venues: The Village Vanguard, New York City
- Genre: Jazz
- Length: 55:33
- Labels: somethin'else (Toshiba EMI); TOCJ-5572
- Producer: Junko Onishi

Junko Onishi chronology
Live at the Village Vanguard (1994)	Live at the Village Vanguard, Vol. II (1995)	Piano Quintet Suite (1995)

Professional ratings
Review scores
Source	Rating
Allmusic	4/5 stars

Live at the Village Vanguard, Vol. II is the fourth album by Japanese pianist Junko Onishi, released on February 22, 1995 in Japan. It was released on February 25, 1997 by Blue Note Records.

== Track listing ==
No.	Title	Lyrics	Music	Length
1.	"The House Of Blue Lights"	-	Gigi Gryce	9:19
2.	"Never Let Me Go"	Ray Evans	Jay Livingston	10:27
3.	"Brilliant Corners"	-	Thelonious Monk	10:24
4.	"Ringo Oiwake"	-	Masao Yoneyama	20:29
5.	"Tea for Two"	Irving Caesar	Vincent Youmans	6:31

== Personnel ==
- Junko Onishi – piano
- Reginald Veal – bass
- Herlin Riley – drums

== Production ==
- Executive Producer - Hitoshi Namekata
- Co-Producer - Junko Onishi
- Recording and Mixing Engineer - Jim Anderson
- Assistant Engineer - Brian Kingman, James Biggs, Mark Shane
- Mixing Engineer - Masuzo Iida
- Mastering engineer - Yoshio Okazuki
- Cover Photograph - Norman Saito
- Art director - Kaoru Taku
- A&R - Yoshiko Tsuge
