= Tea Times =

Studio album by Junko Onishi
- Released: June 22, 2016
- Recorded: March 6–9, 2016
- Studios: Sony Music Studio, Studio FAVRE, Tokyo
- Genre: Jazz
- Length: 1:00:51
- Labels: Taboo (Village); VRCL-18853
- Producer: Naruyoshi Kikuchi

Junko Onishi chronology
Baroque (2010)	Tea Times (2016)	Very Special (2017)

Professional ratings
Review scores
Source	Rating
AllMusic	Not rated

Tea Times is an album by the jazz pianist Junko Onishi, recorded and released in 2016.

== Track listing ==
No.	Title	Music	Length
1.	"Tea Time 2"	Naruyoshi Kikuchi	5:29
2.	"Blackberry"	Naruyoshi Kikuchi	3:39
3.	"Tea Time 1"	Naruyoshi Kikuchi	7:21
4.	"Chromatic Universe"	George Russell	6:17
5.	"GL/JM"	Naruyoshi Kikuchi	4:54
6.	"The Intersection"	Miho Hazama	8:11
7.	"Caroline Champtier"	Naruyoshi Kikuchi	4:37
8.	"Malcolm Vibraphone X" (featuring N/K, OMSB)	Naruyoshi Kikuchi	4:36
9.	"U Know" (featuring OMSB, JUMA, 矢幅歩, 吉田沙良)	Naruyoshi Kikuchi	4:36
10.	"Fetish"	Naruyoshi Kikuchi	16:19
Total length:			60:51

- Miho Hazama - Horn section arrange (M5)
- Ryoji Ihara - Transcription、Horn coordinat (M4)
- Naruyoshi Kikuchi - Edit

== Personnel ==
- Junko Onishi - Piano
- Terreon Gully - drums
- Yunior Terry - Bass
- Horns
  - Tokuhiro Doi - Alto saxophone, Clarinet
  - Kazuhiro Kondo - Alto saxophone
  - Ryoji Ihara - Tenor saxophone, Flute
  - Masakuni Takeno - Tenor saxophone
  - Kei Suzuki - Baritone saxophone
  - Eijiro Nakagawa - Trombone
  - Nobuhide Handa - Trombone
  - Ryota Sasaguri - Trombone
  - Koichi Nonoshita - Bass trombone
  - Eric Miyashiro - Trumpet
  - Koji Nishimura - Trumpet
  - Masahiko Sugasaka - Trumpet
  - Atsushi Osawa - Trumpet
- Yosuke Miyajima - Guitar
- Naruyoshi Kikuchi (N/K from JAZZ DOMMUNISTERS) - Rap (M8)
- OMSB (from SHIMI LAB) - Rap (M8, M9)
- JUMA (from SHIMI LAB) - Rap (M9)
- Saya Yoshida - Chorus (M9)
- Ayumu Yahaba - Chorus (M9)

=== M4 ===
- Ryoji Ihara - Tenor saxophone, Flute
- Tokuhiro Doi - Alto saxophone
- Kei Suzuki - Baritone saxophone
- Eijiro Nakagawa - Trombone
- Nobuhide Handa - Trombone
- Ryota Sasaguri - Trombone
- Eric Miyashiro - Trumpet
- Koji Nishimura - Trumpet
- Masahiko Sugasaka - Trumpet
- Atsushi Osawa - Trumpet

== Production ==
- Producer - Naruyoshi Kikuchi
- Recording Director & Coordinator - Tomohiro Oya (mimi-tab.)
- Recording and mixing engineer - Takashi Akaku (mimi-tab.)
  Recorded at Sony Music Studios Tokyo, Studio FAVRE
  Mixed at Studio FAVRE
- Assistant engineer - Takemasa Kosaka, Yuta Yoneyama
- Mastering engineer - Koji Suzuki (Sony Music Studios Tokyo)
  Mastering at Sony Music Studios Tokyo
- Piano Tuniner - Megumi Omamiuda
- Pre production - Kei Maruyama, Shiro Tanaka
- Cover photo - Naruyoshi Kikuchi
- Booklet Photo - Hiroshi Nirei
- Hair and Make-up Artist - Eiichi Ikeda (ZENO)
- Art direction - Tadashi Kitagawa
- Coordination - Yuki Kaihori
- TABOO Label
  - Label Producer - Hiroshi Fujiyoshi
  - Label Administration - Miyuki Adachi, Masahiro Komai
  - Business Affairs - Hisae Seki
  - International Affairs - Sanpei Yamaguchi, Eri Komazaki
- Executive Producers - Akira Takahashi, Michihiko Nakayama, Kenichi Hirose

== Release history ==
Region	Date	Label	Format	Catalog	memo
Japan	June 22, 2016	Taboo (Village Records)	SA-CD	VRCL-18853	Hybrid, STEREO
Japan	June 22, 2016	Sony Music Entertainment Japan	Digital download	4542696007551	mora AAC-LC 320 kbit/s
Japan	June 22, 2016	Sony Music Entertainment Japan	Digital download	4542696007551	mora FLAC 96.0 kHz/24bit
Japan	June 22, 2016	Sony Music Entertainment Japan	Digital download	A1004448954	RecoChoku
Japan	June 22, 2016	Sony Music Entertainment Japan	Digital download	B0045PHT8C	Amazon.co.jp mp3
Japan	June 22, 2016	Sony Music Entertainment Japan	Digital download	1123928695	iTunes Store
Japan	June 22, 2016	Sony Music Entertainment Japan	Digital download	10668	HD-music FLAC 96 kHz/24bit
