= Junko Onishi (musician) =

Japanese jazz pianist (born 1967)

Junko Onishi 大西 順子
- Born: Ōnishi Junko; April 16, 1967 (age 59); Kyoto, Japan
- Genres: Jazz
- Occupations: Musician; composer; producer
- Instrument: Piano
- Years active: 1989–present
- Labels: Somethin' Else (EMI Music Japan, Blue Note); Verve (Universal); Taboo (Sony Music)
- Website: Official website

Junko Onishi (大西 順子, Ōnishi Junko; born April 16, 1967 in Kyoto) is a Japanese jazz pianist; she plays in the post-bop genre.

== Early career ==
After studying at the Berklee College of Music in Boston, Onishi moved to New York City, where she played with Joe Henderson, Betty Carter, Kenny Garrett, and Mingus Dynasty. She has also worked with Jackie McLean, Holly Cole, and Billy Higgins, among others, and has recorded eight CDs for Blue Note Records (Somethin' Else, in Japan) as a leader.

In May 1994, Onishi played for a week at the Village Vanguard, with Wynton Marsalis's sidemen, bassist Reginald Veal, and drummer Herlin Riley.

Although she lists Duke Ellington, Thelonious Monk, and Ornette Coleman as her primary influences, her playing is also reminiscent of McCoy Tyner and contemporaries such as Kenny Kirkland and Mulgrew Miller.

Onishi appeared in the documentary Blue Note: A Story of Modern Jazz (1997), playing the song "Trinity" ("Quick") from her album Play, Piano, Play.

== Hiatus and later career ==
Onishi stopped performing in the late 1990s, having chosen to study and practice. When Jaki Byard, her mentor at that time, died in 1999, she stopped playing completely for two years: "I felt like I lost everything; I felt like I didn't have any more mentors." She had to redevelop her technique when she decided to return and started going to a gym to help her cope with the physical demands of playing.

Blue Note released her trio album, Musical Moments in 2009. Baroque (Verve, 2010), with Onishi leading a much larger group, followed a year later.

== Discography ==
=== As leader ===
Year recorded	Title	Label	Notes
1992	Wow	Somethin' Else	Trio, with Tomoyuki Shima (b), Dairiki Hara (d)
1993	Cruisin'	Somethin' Else /Blue Note	Trio, with Rodney Whitaker (b), Billy Higgins (d)
1994	Live at the Village Vanguard	Somethin' Else /Blue Note	Trio, with Reginald Veal (b), Herlin Riley (d).
1994	Live at the Village Vanguard, Vol II	Somethin' Else /Blue Note	Trio, with Reginald Veal (b), Herlin Riley (d).
1995	Piano Quintet Suite	Somethin' Else /Blue Note	Quintet, with Eiichi Hayashi (as), Marcus Belgrave (tp, voc), Rodney Whitaker (b), Tony Rabeson (d)
1996	Play, Piano, Play	Somethin' Else /Blue Note	Trio, with Shigeo Aramaki (b), Dairiki Hara (d). In concert
1997	Self Portrait	Somethin' Else	Compilation
1998	Fragile	Somethin' Else /Blue Note	Onishi also plays keyboards. With Reginald Veal (b), Karriem Riggins, Motohiko Hino, Tamaya Honda (d; separately)
2008–9	Musical Moments	Somethin' Else /Blue Note	Trio, with Yousuke Inoue (b), Gean Jackson (d). Bonus track from 2008 is trio, with Reginald Veal (b), Herlin Riley (d)
2010	Baroque	Verve	
2016	Tea Times	Taboo (Village Records)	with Terreon Gully, Yunior Terry, Tokuhiro Doi, Kazuhiro Kondo, Ryoji Ihara, Masakuni Takeno, Kei Suzuki, Eijiro Nakagawa, Nobuhide Handa, Ryota Sasaguri, Koichi Nonoshita, Eric Miyashiro, Koji Nishimura, Masahiko Sugasaka, Atsushi Osawa, Yosuke Miyajima, Naruyoshi Kikuchi, OMSB, JUMA, Saya Yoshida, Ayumu Yahaba
2017	Very Special	Taboo (Village Records)	with Takayoshi Baba, José James, Miho Hazama, Takuya Mori, Yoshie Sato, Shinnosuke Takahashi, Yousuke Inoue
2017	Glamorous Life	SOMETHIN'COOL	

=== As sideman ===
Year recorded	Leader	Title	Label	Notes
1994	Shigeharu Mukai	J Quintet Featuring Junko Onishi	Somethin' Else	
1996	Jackie McLean	Hat Trick	Somethin' Else (Blue Note)	
1996	Joe Lovano	Tenor Time	Somethin' Else	
1999	Phil Woods	Cool Woods	Somethin' Else	
