= Piano Quintet Suite =

Studio album by Junko Onishi
- Released: September 20, 1995
- Recorded: July 7–10, 1995
- Studios: Woodstock Karuizawa Studio, Karuizawa, Japan
- Genre: Jazz
- Length: 61:37
- Labels: Somethin' Else (Toshiba EMI); TOCJ-5576
- Producer: Hitoshi Namekata

Junko Onishi chronology
Live at the Village Vanguard Vol. II (1995)	Piano Quintet Suite (1995)	Play, Piano, Play (1996)

Professional ratings
Review scores
Source	Rating
Allmusic	4/5 stars

Piano Quintet Suite is the fifth leader album by Japanese pianist Junko Onishi, released on September 20, 1995 in Japan. It was released on March 19, 1996 by Blue Note Records.

== Track listing ==
No.	Title	Lyrics	Music	Length
1.	"Piano Quintet Suite"	-	Junko Onishi	10:20
2.	"Peggy's Blue Skylight"	-	Charles Mingus	9:22
3.	"Interlude 1"	-	Robert Schumann	1:27
4.	"Naturally"	-	Junko Onishi	10:35
5.	"Interlude 2"	-	Junko Onishi	0:51
6.	"The Tropic Of Capricorn"	-	Junko Onishi, Eiichi Hayashi	9:29
7.	"Tony"	-	Junko Onishi	3:20
8.	"Orange Was The Color Of Her Dress, Then Blue Silk"	-	Charles Mingus	7:56
9.	"Take The A Train"	-	Duke Ellington	6:58

== Personnel ==
- Junko Onishi – piano
- Marcus Belgrave – trumpet, vocal
- Eiichi Hayashi – alto saxophone
- Rodney Whitaker – bass
- Tony Rabeson – drums

== Production ==
- Executive producer – Hitoshi Namekata
- Co-Producer – Junko Onishi
- Recording and mixing engineer – Jim Anderson
- Assistant engineer – Yutaka Uematsu, Kensuke Miura
- Mastering engineer – Yoshio Okazaki
- Cover photograph – Kunihiro Takuma
- Inner photograph – Fumiaki Fujimoto
- Art director – Kaoru Taku
- A&R – Yoshiko Tsuge
