= Wow (Junko Onishi album) =

WOW

Studio album by Junko Onishi
- Released: January 20, 1993
- Recorded: September 3–5, 1992
- Studios: Sound City (Studio 1), Tokyo
- Genre: Jazz
- Length: 51:00
- Labels: Somethin' Else (Toshiba EMI); TOCJ-5547
- Producer: Junko Onishi

Junko Onishi chronology
WOW (1993)	Cruisin' (1993)

WOW is the first leader album by Japanese pianist Junko Onishi, released on January 20, 1993 in Japan.

== Track listing ==
No.	Title	Lyrics	Music	Length
1.	"The Jungular"	-	Junko Onishi	7:08
2.	"Rockin' in Rhythm"	-	Duke Ellington	5:49
3.	"B-Rush"	-	Junko Onishi	5:59
4.	"Prospect Park West"	-	Junko Onishi	3:23
5.	"Point-Counter-Point"	-	Junko Onishi	4:54
6.	"Brilliant Corners"	-	Thelonious S. Monk	5:10
7.	"Nature Boy"	-	Eden Ahbez	8:35
8.	"Broadway Blues"	-	Ornette Coleman	8:35

== Personnel ==
- Junko Onishi – piano
- Tomoyuki Shima – bass
- Dairiki Hara – drums

== Production ==
- Producer - Junko Onishi
- Executive producer - Hitoshi Namekata
- Recording and mixing engineer - Masuzo Iida
- Assistant Engineer - Yoshimitsu Kubota, Satoshi Nakazawa
- Mastering engineer - Yoshio Okazuki
- Cover photograph - Kunihiro Takuma
- Art director - Kaoru Taku
- A&R - Yoshiko Tsuge
