= Meg Okura =

American jazz violinist and composer (born 1973)

- Also known as: Meg Okura, 大倉めぐみ
- Born: 大倉恵 (Megumi Okura); August 9, 1973 (age 52); Ome, Japan
- Education: Juilliard School
- Genres: Chamber jazz, Jazz, world, classical
- Occupations: Musician, composer
- Instruments: Violin, erhu, electric violin
- Years active: 2001–present
- Website: megokura.com

Meg Okura (born August 9, 1973) is an American jazz violinist, composer, erhu player, and leader of the Pan Asian Chamber Jazz Ensemble, based in New York City. She is also a member of Pharaoh's Daughter, Emilio Solla y La Inestable de Brooklyn, which was nominated for the 57th Grammy Award for Best Latin Jazz Album, and the New York Tango Quartet, among other bands. She has worked with jazz and pop artists such as Michael Brecker, Lee Konitz, Dianne Reeves, Steve Swallow, Tom Harrell, David Bowie and Mariko Takahashi as well as actor/musician Terrence Howard. Okura has also been the featured violinist in the Cirque du Soleil shows Varekai, Corteo and Wintuk.

== Early life ==
Meg Okura (大倉恵, born in Tokyo, Japan), started studying music at Toho Gakuen School of Music at five years of age. As a child, she served as a church pianist and organist at an Evangelical church in her home town of Ome. In the early 1990s, she toured Asia as the concertmaster and soloist of the Asian Youth Orchestra. In 1992, she made her U.S. solo debut with the late Alexander Schneider and the New York String Orchestra at the Kennedy Center in Washington, D.C. Okura has earned bachelor's and master's degrees from the Juilliard School as a classical violinist.

== Personal life ==
Meg Okura has been married to American jazz soprano saxophonist and composer Sam Newsome since 2004.

== Honors and awards ==
- Chamber Music America New Jazz Works – 2018
- The Grammy Award, 2015 (Nominee)
- Manhattan Community Arts Fund (Lower Manhattan Cultural Council)- 2013 & 2015
- New Music USA Project Grant (New Music USA)- 2014
- Brand Personality Award, The BrandLaureate Asia Pacific Brands Foundation)- 2012
- Meet the Composer, Metlife Creative Connections Grant – 2008
- Manhattan Community Art fund (LMCC)- 2008
- American Composers Forum, Jerome Composers Commissioning Program- 2007–2008
- Meet the Composer, Metlife Creative Connections Grant
- Urban Artist Initiative / NYC – 2006
- 2005 International Songwriting Competition (Honorable Mention)
- 2005 American University Saxophone Symposium Composition Contest (Honorable Mention)
- The 2003 John Lennon Songwriting Contest (Honorable Mention)
- The 2000 John Lennon Songwriting Contest (Honorable Mention)

== Discography ==
As A Leader

- IMA IMA by Pan Asian Chamber Jazz Ensemble (2018) – featuring Tom Harrell
- NPO Trio Live at The Stone (2018)
- Las Vegas Tango (2013)
- Music of Ryuichi Sakamoto by Pan Asian Chamber Jazz Ensemble (2013)
- Naima (Pan Asian Chamber Jazz Ensemble) (2010)
- Meg Okura's Pan Asian Chamber Jazz Ensemble (2006)
- Be Thou My Vision (Life Music Japan)
- Peace In My Heart (Life Music Japan)(1998)
- Never Alone (Life Music Japan)(2000)
