= Play, Piano, Play =

Live album by Junko Onishi
- Released: November 7, 1996
- Recorded: 1: July 20, 1996; 2–4: July 18, 1996; 5–7: July 11, 1996
- Venues: 1: The Jazz Open, Stuttgart; 2–4: The Blue Note Club, Pori Jazz Festival, Finland; 5–7: Montreux Jazz Festival
- Genre: Jazz
- Length: 55:33
- Labels: Somethin' Else (Toshiba EMI); TOCJ-5583
- Producer: Hitoshi Namekata

Junko Onishi chronology
Piano Quintet Suite (1995)	Play, Piano, Play (1996)	Self Portrait (1998)

Junko Onishi Trio Live in Europe: Play, Piano, Play is an album by Japanese pianist Junko Onishi, released on November 7, 1996 in Japan.

== Track listing ==
No.	Title	Lyrics	Music	Length
1.	"Piano, Play, Piano"	-	Erroll Garner	5:20
2.	"How High the Moon"	Nancy Hamilton	Morgan Lewis	13:07
3.	"Slugs"	-	Junko Onishi	7:46
4.	"Trinity"	-	Junko Onishi	7:11
5.	"Portrait In Blue"	-	Junko Onishi	10:08
6.	"Kutoubia"	-	Junko Onishi	11:31
7.	"The Jungular"	-	Junko Onishi	6:47

== Personnel ==
- Junko Onishi – piano
- Shigeo Aramaki – bass
- Dairiki Hara – drums

== Production ==
- Executive Producer - Hitoshi Namekata
- Co-Producer - Junko Onishi
- Recording Engineer - 1: Johannes Steuer, Manfred Deppe, 2–4: Jaakko James, Andy Snellaman, 5–7: Many Guiot
- Mixing Engineer - Shunichi Kogai
- Mastering engineer - Yoshio Okazuki
- Cover and Inner Photograph - Edouard Curchod
- Art director - Kaoru Taku
- A&R - Yoshiko Tsuge
