= Glamorous Life (album) =

Studio album by Junko Onishi
- Released: November 15, 2017
- Recorded: September 4–5 & September 6, 2017
- Studios: Sound City A-studio & Sound City Setagaya Tokyo
- Genre: Jazz
- Length: 52:00
- Labels: SOMETHIN'COOL; SCOL-1025
- Producer: Junko Onishi

Junko Onishi chronology
Very Special (2017)	Glamorous Life (2017)

Glamorous Life is an album by the jazz pianist Junko Onishi, recorded and released in 2017.

== Track listing ==
No.	Title	Music	Length
1.	"Essential"	Junko Onishi	7:22
2.	"Golden Boys"	Junko Onishi	7:55
3.	"A Love Song (a.k.a. Kutoubia)"	Junko Onishi	6:08
4.	"Arabesque"	Junko Onishi	5:51
5.	"Tiger Rag"	Nick LaRocca, Eddie Edwards, Henry Ragas, Tony Sbarbaro, Larry Shields	2:04
6.	"Almost Like Me"	Hasaan Ibn Ali	6:58
7.	"Hot Ginger Apple Pie"	Junko Onishi	5:00
8.	"Fast City"	Joe Zawinul	6:07
9.	"7/29/04 The Day Of (from Ocean's Twelve)"	David Holmes	4:04
Total length:			52:00

== Personnel ==
- Junko Onishi – piano
- Yousuke Inoue – bass
- Shinnosuke Takahashi – drums

== Production ==
- Producer – Junko Onishi
- Co-producer – Hitoshi Namekata (Names Inc.), Ryoko Sakamoto (disunion)
- Recording and mixing engineer – Shinya Matsushita (STUDIO Dede)
- Recorded at Sound City A-studio, Sound City Setagaya
- Assistant engineer – Taiyo Nakayama (Sound City)
- Mastering engineer – Akihito Yoshikawa (STUDIO Dede)
- Cover photo – Haruyuki Shirai, Tetsuya Kurahara
- Art director – Takuma Hojo
- Hair and make-up artist – Naoki Katagiri (EFFECTOR)
- Stylist – Yuka Kikuchi

== Release history ==
Region	Date	Label	Format	Catalog	memo
Japan	November 15, 2017	SOMETHIN'COOL	12cmCD	SCOL-1025	STEREO
Japan	November 15, 2017	SOMETHIN'COOL	Digital download	4538182726914	mora AAC-LC 320kbit/s
Japan	November 15, 2017	SOMETHIN'COOL	Digital download	4538182726921	mora FLAC 96.0 kHz/24bit
Japan	November 15, 2017	SOMETHIN'COOL	Digital download	B077668PCN	Amazon.com
Japan	November 15, 2017	SOMETHIN'COOL	Digital download	1308873162	iTunes Store
Japan	November 15, 2017	SOMETHIN'COOL	Digital download	Bimrq37bic2orsixhxcxqjvovbm	Google Play Music
Japan	November 15, 2017	SOMETHIN'COOL	Digital download	5O1oF23gUwn7v0rBUPayLu	Spotify
Japan	November 15, 2017	SOMETHIN'COOL	Digital download	bd71bc698aa295823e31	AWA 320kbit/s
Japan	December 20, 2017	SOMETHIN'COOL	30cmLP	SCOL-1025	STEREO
