= Fragile (Junko Onishi album) =

Studio album by Junko Onishi
- Released: September 23, 1998
- Recorded: July 5–7, 1998
- Studio: Toshiba-EMI studio 3, Tokyo
- Genre: Jazz
- Length: 56:45
- Label: Somethin' Else (Toshiba EMI); TOCJ-8008
- Producer: Hitoshi Namekata

Junko Onishi chronology
| Self Portrait (1998) | Fragile (1998) | Musical Moments (2009) |

Fragile is the seventh leader album by the Japanese pianist Junko Onishi, released on September 23, 1998, in Japan. It was re-released on May 4, 1999, by Blue Note Records.

== Reception ==
Professional ratings
Review scores
| Source | Rating |
|---|---|
| AllMusic | 4/5 stars |
| The Penguin Guide to Jazz Recordings | 3/4 stars |

In a review for AllMusic, Tim Sheridan wrote: "Onishi gets into a classic rock groove on this disc... Her fervent piano attack in particular keeps the disc consistently interesting."

The authors of The Penguin Guide to Jazz Recordings called the album "a fun record for Onishi," but noted that it "sidles into self-indulgence at points."

A reviewer for Billboard stated that, on the album, Onishi "forgoes tradition and lets the fun fly." They commented: "The results are infectious, as the individual tracks open, develop, and eventually burn with enthusiasm."

The Australian Financial Review's Shane Nichols called the music "an interesting dip into the past," and remarked: "It's no secret that Onishi swings; this album proves she rocks too."

A writer for the Orlando Weekly described the album as "a jam-intensive adventure," noting that Onishi "has made a startling leap from sublime acoustic post-bop to sonic terrain largely associated with '70s fusion and contemporary groove-jazz."

Writing for All About Jazz, David Adler stated: "I've never been a fan of the rock cover trend in the jazz world. The concept has sent many a fine jazz CD off the tracks, and it manages nearly to ruin this one entirely." Another AAJ reviewer commented: "Fragile is ironically quite pliable and coarse at times, wielding an oft-unwieldy arsenal of moods and sounds which occasionally (and admittedly) lose their sense of form and function."

== Track listing ==
| No. | Title | Lyrics | Music | Length |
|---|---|---|---|---|
| 1. | "Phaethon" | - | Junko Onishi | 8:21 |
| 2. | "Complexions" | - | Junko Onishi | 7:21 |
| 3. | "You've Lost That Lovin' Feelin'" | - | Phil Spector, Barry Mann, Cynthia Weil | 11:38 |
| 4. | "Compared To What" | Gene McDaniels | Gene McDaniels | 7:05 |
| 5. | "Hey Joe" | - | Billy Roberts | 10:46 |
| 6. | "Eulogia Variation" | - | Junko Onishi | 6:16 |
| 7. | "Sunshine Of Your Love (JAM)" | - | Jack Bruce - Pete Brown - Eric Clapton | 5:18 |

== Personnel ==
- Junko Onishi - piano
- Reginald Veal - double bass
- Karriem "Ol Skool Jamz" Riggins - drums
- Motohiko Hino - drums (2, 4)
- Tamaya Honda - drums (5, 7)
- PEACE - Vocal (4)

== Production ==
- Executive producer - Hitoshi Namekata
- Co-producer - Junko Onishi
- Recording and mixing engineer - Jim Anderson
- Assistant engineer - Masataka Saito, Masaaki Ugazin, Tomoyuki Fukuda
- Mastering engineer - Yoshio Okazaki
- Cover photograph - Kunihiro Takuma
- Inner photograph - Hitsuru Hirota
- Art director - Kaoru Taku
- A&R - Yoshiko Tsuge
