= Musical Moments =

Studio album by Junko Onishi
- Released: July 23, 2009
- Recorded: April 30 & May 1, 2009 (M1–9), September 14, 2008 (M10)
- Studios: Sound City Studio, Tokyo (M1–9); Blue Note Tokyo (M10)
- Genre: Jazz
- Length: 1:05:18
- Labels: Somethin' Else (Toshiba EMI); TOCJ-68085
- Producer: Hitoshi Namekata

Junko Onishi chronology
Fragile (1998)	Musical Moments (2009)	Baroque (2010)

Musical Moments is the eighth leader album by Japanese pianist Junko Onishi, released on July 23, 2009 in Japan.

== Track listing ==
No.	Title	Lyrics	Music	Length
1.	"Hat And Beard"	-	Eric Dolphy	5:29
2.	"I Gotta Right to Sing the Blues"	Ted Koehler	Harold Arlen	3:39
3.	"Back In The Days"	-	Junko Onishi	7:21
4.	"Bittersweet"	-	Junko Onishi	6:17
5.	"Ill Wind"	Ted Koehler	Harold Arlen	5:34
6.	"Musical Moments"	-	Junko Onishi	8:11
7.	"Something Sweet, Something Tender"	-	Eric Dolphy	4:37
8.	"G.W."	-	Eric Dolphy	4:36
9.	"Smoke Gets In Your Eyes"	Otto Harbach	Jerome Kern	3:15
10.	"Bonus Track Meloday"	-	-	16:19

Bonus Track Meloday
No.	Title	Lyrics	Music	Length
1.	"So Long Eric"	-	Charles Mingus	-
2.	"Mood Indigo"	Irving Mills	Duke Ellington, Barney Bigard	-
3.	"Do Nothing till You Hear from Me"	Bob Russell	Duke Ellington	-
Total length:				16:19

== Personnel ==
- Junko Onishi – piano
- Yosuke Inoue – bass (M1, 3, 4, 6–8)
- Gene Jackson – drums (M1, 3, 4, 6–8)
- Reginald Veal – bass (M10)
- Herlin Riley – drums (M10)

== Production ==
- Co-producer - Junko Onishi
- Executive producer - Hitoshi Namekata
- Recording and mixing engineer - Tomoo Suzuki (M1–9), Akihiko Kurazono (M10), Masashi Okada (M10), Tomomi Shimura (M10), Shingo Okubo (M10), Toshiharu Yamauchi (M10)
- Assistant engineer - Kiyoshi Nishiyama (M1–9), Masanori Hata (M1–9)
- Mixing engineer - Tomoo Suzuki
- Mastering engineer - Machiko Suzue
- Piano tuning - Norihito Onuma
- Cover photograph - Kunihiro Takuma
- Hair and make-up - Hiroyuki Mikami
- Styling - Nobuko Shindo
- Art director - Kaoru Taku
- Artists and repertoire - Yoshiko Tsuge
