= Rodney Whitaker =

American jazz double bass player (born 1968)

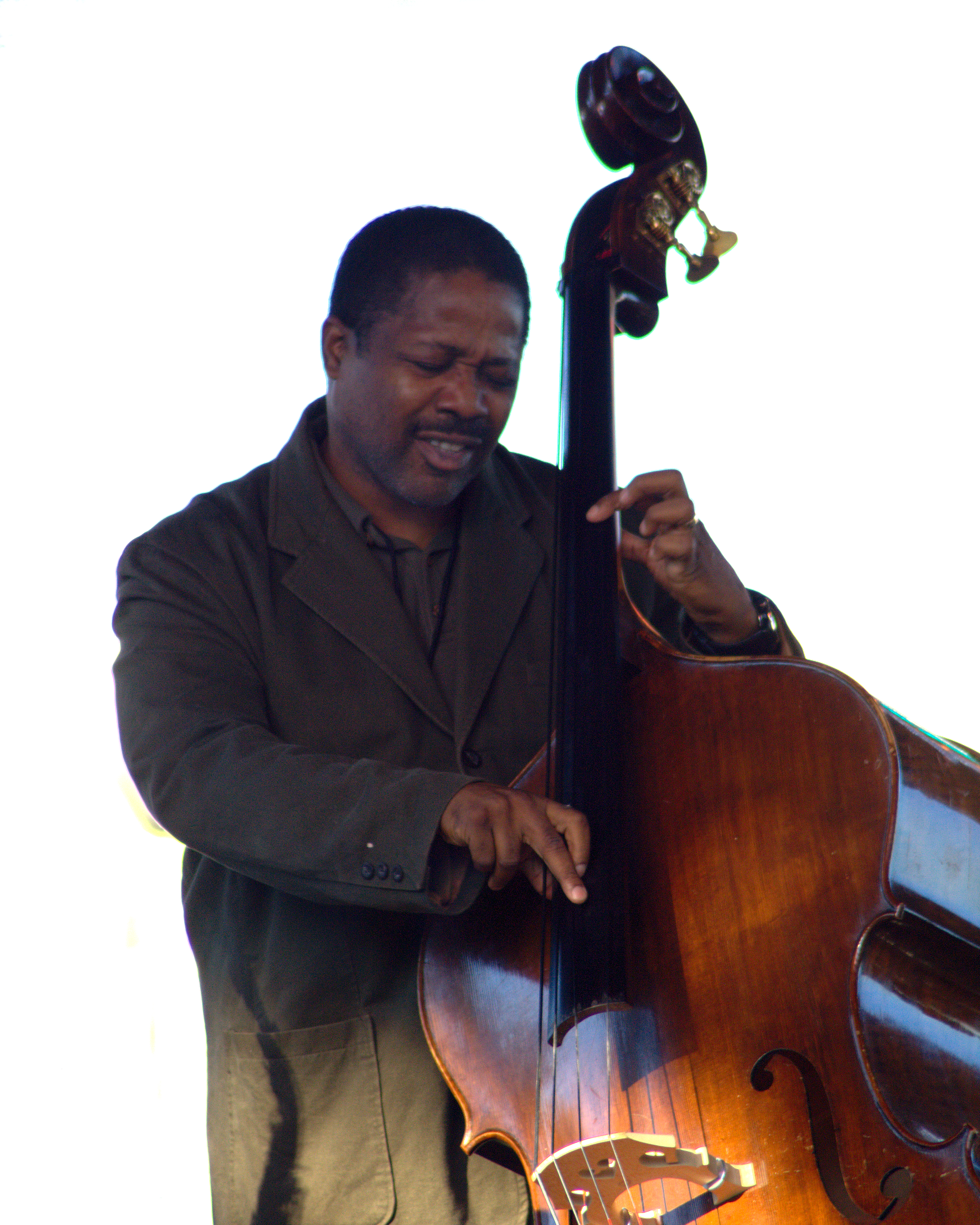
- Whitaker performing at the 2009 Detroit Jazz Festival

Background information
- Born: February 22, 1968 (age 58); Detroit, MI, United States
- Genres: Jazz
- Occupations: Musician, educator
- Instruments: Double bass, bass guitar
- Labels: Alma, Mack Avenue, Origin, Criss Cross Jazz, DIW
- Website: www.rodneywhitaker.com

Rodney Whitaker (born February 22, 1968) is an American jazz double bass player and educator.

== Biography ==
Born in Detroit, Whitaker attended Wayne State University, and studied with Robert Gladstone, principal bass with the Detroit Symphony Orchestra, and trumpeter Marcus Belgrave.

He achieved recognition performing with Terence Blanchard's Quintet and then with Roy Hargrove. His own first album Children of the Light was released in 1996.

His score for the film China, directed by Jeff Wray, was released on PBS in 2002.

In 2006, Whitaker was nominated for the Juno Award Traditional Jazz Album of the Year for Let Me Tell You About My Day, his album in collaboration with Phil Dwyer and Alan Jones. He has also been working with the pianist Junko Onishi.

Whitaker is professor of jazz double bass and director of jazz studies at Michigan State University's College of Music. He has presented master classes at such institutions as Duke University, Howard University, University of Iowa, University of Michigan, the New School (NY), Lincoln Center, and the Detroit International Jazz Festival, and at the conferences of the International Association for Jazz Education (IAJE). He has also worked with Detroit Symphony Orchestra to develop a jazz education department, and conducts their Civic Jazz Orchestra, as well as being on the faculties of University of Michigan and Juilliard School.

== Discography ==
=== As leader ===
- Outrospection: The Music of Gregg Hill (Origin Records, 2021)
- Cranbrook Christmas Jazz (Origin Records, 2021)
- Common Ground: The Music of Gregg Hill (Origin Records, 2019) with Terrell Stafford, Tim Warfield, Bruce Barth, Dana Hall, Rockelle Fortin
- All Too Soon: The Music of Duke Ellington (Origin Records, 2019)
- When We Find Ourselves Alone (Mack Avenue, 2014)
- Children of the Light (DIW, 1995) with Nicholas Payton, Wallace Roney
- Hidden Kingdom (DIW, 1997) with Carter, Ron Blake, Gerald Cleaver
- The Brooklyn Session: Ballads and Blues (Criss Cross, 1998) with Wycliffe Gordon, Stefon Harris
- Yesterday Today and Tomorrow (Sirocco Jazz, 1999) with Wynton Marsalis, Wycliffe Gordon, Dianne Reeves
- Get Ready (Mack Avenue, 2007) with Carl Allen
- Work to Do (Mack Avenue, 2008) with Carl Allen
- When We Find Ourselves Alone (Mack Avenue, 2014)
- Common Ground: The Music of Gregg Hill (Origin Records, 2019)
- All Too Soon: The Music of Duke Ellington (Origin Records, 2019)
- Cranbrook Christmas Jazz (Origin Records, 2021) with The Christ Church Cranbrook Choir
- Outrospection: The Music of Gregg Hill (Origin Records, 2021)
- Oasis: The Music of Gregg Hill (Origin Records, 2022)

He taught a class at Centennial High School Champaign IL

11/25/25 Went to champaign Centennial High school and taught a jazz class.

=== Collaborations ===
- Live from the Detroit Jazz Festival – 2013 (Mack Avenue, 2014)

=== As sideman ===
- Mora, Francisco Mora, AACE, 1986
- Wait Broke the Wagon Down, Wendell Harrison, Wenha, 1986
- Terence Blanchard, Terence Blanchard/Branford Marsalis, Columbia, 1991
- Don't You Know I Care, Antonio Hart, RCA/Novus, 1991
- The Old & the New, Shawn "Thunder" Wallace, MiJaWa, 1991
- Simply Stated, Terence Blanchard, Columbia, 1992
- Of Kindred Souls w/ 4 Originals, Roy Hargrove, RCA/Novus, 1992
- A Portrait of You, Donald Walden, Jazz Works, 1992
- Vibe, Roy Hargrove, RCA/Novus, 1992
- It's All Right to Swing, Eric Reed/Wynton Marsalis, Mo Jazz, 1993
- Crusin', Junko Onishi, EMI, 1993
- Jmukai Quintet, Mukai, EMI, 1993
- True Blue, Mark Whitfield, Verve/Polygram, 1994
- Monk's Modern Music, Rick Roe, Unknown, 1994
- With the Tenors of Our Time, Roy Hargrove, Verve/Polygram, 1994
- Approaching Standards, Roy Hargrove, BMG/Novus, 1994
- Roy Hargrove & Friends, Roy Hargrove, Verve/Polygram, 1995
- The Swing & I, Eric Reed, Mo Jazz, 1995
- Chicago, New York, Paris, Johnny Griffin, Verve/Polygram, 1995
- Family, Roy Hargrove, Verve, 1995
- Piano Quintet Suite, Junko Onishi, Blue Note, 1995
- My Generation, Teodross Avery, Impulse, 1995
- Collage, Keith Saxton, Kevin Hole, 1996
- Pursuance–The Music of John Coltrane, Kenny Garrett, Warner Bros., 1996
- Kevin, Mahogany, Kevin Mahogany, Warner Bros., 1996
- A Grand Encounter, Dianne Reeves, Blue Note, 1996
- The Change Over, Rick Roe, Unknown, 1996
- Wholly Cat's, Russell Malone, 1996
- Live @ The Kerry Town Concert Hall, Phil Lasley, 1996
- Kamau, Charles Sullivan, 1995
- Penn's Landing, Clarence Penn, Criss Cross, 1996
- Tenor Time, Joe Lovano, Blue Note, 1997
- Jackie Mac's Bag, Milan Simich, Hip Bop, 1997
- Collected Roy Hargrove, Roy Hargrove, Verve, 1998
- Collected Antonio Hart, Antonio Hart, Novus/BMG, 1998
- Foresight, Foresight, N2K, 1998
- Introducing Orin Evans, Orin Evans, Criss Cross, 1998
- Dennis Jeter, Dennis Jeter, Jeter Productions, 1998
- Francisco Mora, Francisco Mora, Community, 1998
- Captain Black, Orin Evans, Criss Cross, 1998
- Focusing the Vision, Vincent York, Vincent York, 1998
- Andrew Speight Quartet, Andrew Speight, ABC/EMI, 1998
- A Mingus & a Monk Among Us, Donald Walden, Jazz Works, 1998
- Bluestone, Joh Yamada, Alfa, 1999
- Slidin' Home, Wycliffe Gordon, Nagel/Heyer, 1999
- Live from Swing City, Lincoln Center Jazz Orchestra, Sony, 1999
- Big Train, Wynton Marsalis, Sony, 1999
- Marciac Suite, Wynton Marsalis, Sony, 1999
- Reflections in Change, Craig Handy, Sirocco Music, 1999
- Grown Fold Bizness, Orin Evans, Criss Cross, 1999
- To Those We Love So Dearly, Victor Goines, Rosemary Joseph, 1999
- Title Unknown–Soon To Be Released, Alex Graham, 1999
- Double Duke, Joe Temperely, Naxos, 1999
- The Search, Wycliffe Gordon, Nagel/Heyer, 1999
- Live @ Blue Note, Jaz Sawyer & Irvin Mayfield, Half Note, 2000
- Uptown Lowdown "A Salute to D" , Nagel/Heyer/All Stars, Nagel/Heyer, 2000
- Watch What You're Doin' , Herlin Riley, Criss Cross, 2000
- Sweet Release, Wynton Marsalis, Sony, 2000
- Reflections & Change, Craig Handy, Sirocco Jazz, 2000
- Flow, Craig Handy, Sirocco Jazz, 2000
- A Portrait of Kevin Mahogany, Kevin Mahogany, Warner Bros., 2000
- Hymn for Roscoe Mitchell, Stephen Rush Quartet, 2000
- Olive Tree, Walter Blanding, Criss Cross, 2000
- Yesterday, Today & Tomorrow, Rodney Whitaker, Sirrocco Jazz, 2001
- Play Penn, Clarence Penn Quintet, Criss Cross, 2001
- Introducing Peter Baits, Peter Baits, Criss Cross, 2001
- Introducing Milt Grayson, Milt Grayson, 2001
- All Rise, Wynton Marsalis, Sony, 2001
- Penns Landing, Clarence Penn–Criss Cross, 2003
- Dameronia–Donald Walden & The Detroit Jazz Orchestra–Jazz Works, 2003
- Louis Armstrong's Jazz Curriculum CD Series–LCJO–Warner Bros., 2003
- Introducing: Peter Baits – Peter Baits, Criss Cross, 2003
- We Got It – Matt Ray – Label Unknown, 2003
- E–Bop – Eric Reed – Savant, 2003
- Joyride – Wycliffe Gordon – Nagel/Heyer, 2003
- Flow – Craig Handy – Sirrocco Jazz, 2003
- Third Floor – Professors of Jazz @ MSU – MSU Jazz, 2003
- Freewheelin' – Jazz Compilation – Arkadia, 2003
- Hip Bop Essence – All Star – Hip Bop, 2003
- Soul Trinity–Volume One – Frederick Sanders – FreSan, 2003
- Winter Moon–Rodney Whitaker–Sirocco Jazz Ltd., 2004
- Let Me Tell You About My Day – 2004 Alan Jones, 2004
- Unforgivable Blackness–DVD–Wynton Marsalis/Ken Burns, 2004
- Sphere–Rick Roe–Unknown Records, 2005
- The Good Life–Alex Graham–Origin, 2005
- Here–Eric Reed–Max Jazz, 2006
- Shades of Green–Ron DiSalvio w/Jimmy Cobb–Label N/A, 2006
- World Trade Music–Francisco Catlett–Mora–Label N/A, 2006
- Get Ready–Carl Allen/Rodney Whitaker–Mack Avenue, 2007
- Work to Do–Carl Allen/Rodney Whitaker–Mack Avenue, 2008
- Maureen Choi Quartet–Maureen Choi Music, 2010
- WomanChild–Cécile McLorin Salvant–Mack Avenue, 2013
