= Jim Anderson (sound engineer) =

American recording engineer and producer

- Origin: Pittsburgh, United States of America
- Genres: Jazz and acoustic music
- Occupations: Record producer, sound engineer and audio mixer
- Instrument: French horn

Jim Anderson is an American recording engineer and producer of acoustic music in the recording, radio, television, and film industries.

== Early career ==
Anderson attended Pittsburgh's Duquesne University. He worked at the public radio station WDUQ-FM and was later employed for six years at National Public Radio as a broadcast technician.

== Awards ==
Anderson's recordings have received 13 Grammy awards and 26 Grammy nominations. In broadcasting, his work has received two Peabody Awards for radio programs, and two Emmy Award nominations for television programs.

Anderson's surround mix of Patricia Barber's "Modern Cool" won the Grammy for Best Surround Album in 2013. Jane Ira Bloom's Sixteen Sunsets received a Grammy nomination for Best Surround Album in 2014. In 2018, Anderson's mix of Jane Ira Bloom's Early Americans won a Grammy for Best Surround Album. Anderson mixed the album "just for fun" in 1.5 days. His recording of Patricia Barber's "Clique" was nominated for the Grammy 2022.

A 1969 Butler High School graduate, Anderson was the 2013 Distinguished Graduate Award recipient. He was honored by his college alma mater, Duquesne University, with the University's Mary Pappert School of Music Alumni Achievement Award in 2018.

== Educational and industry activities ==
Anderson has been a lecturer and guest faculty member at multiple institutions including Berklee College of Music, McGill University, Banff Centre of the Arts, Berlin University of the Arts, University of Luleå (Sweden), the New School, Penn State University, and the University of Massachusetts/Lowell. Anderson was president of the Audio Engineering Society; he has chaired AES conventions and received the AES Fellowship Award. Anderson was chair at New York University's Clive Davis Institute of Recorded Music, 2004-2008. He is currently a professor in this program.
