= Jack Delano =

American photographer, composer (1914–1997)

- Яков Овчаров
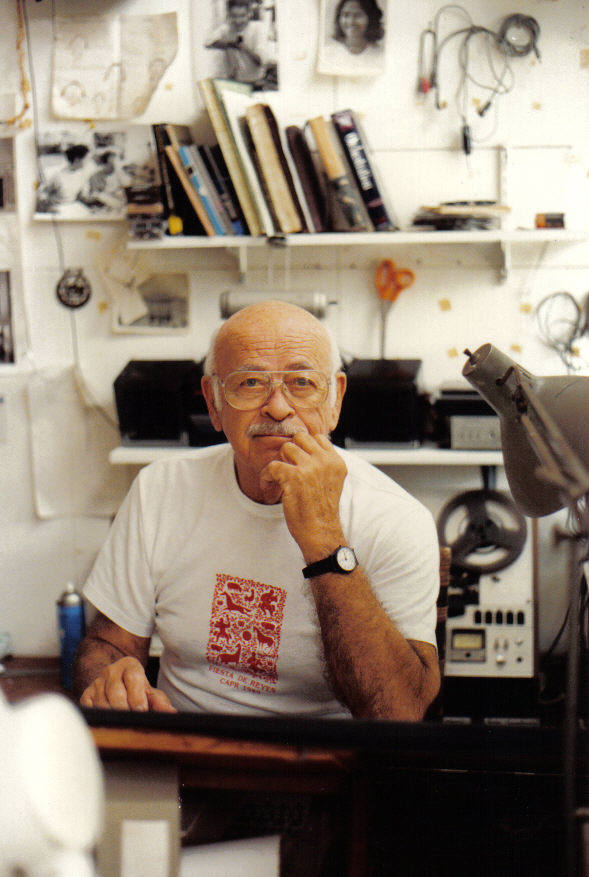
- Delano in his studio. Trujillo Alto, Puerto Rico, 1990
- Born: Yakov Ovcharov; August 1, 1914; Voroshylivka, Russian Empire (now Ukraine)
- Died: August 14, 1997 (aged 83); San Juan, Puerto Rico
- Education: Pennsylvania Academy of the Fine Arts
- Occupation: photographer for the Farm Security Administration

Jack Delano (born Yakov Ovcharov, Ukrainian: Яков Овчаров, romanized: Yakov Ovcharov; August 1, 1914 – August 14, 1997) was a Russian Empire-born Ukrainian photographer, filmmaker, and composer, who spent much of his life in Puerto Rico. In the United States, he worked for the Works Progress Administration, United Fund, and most notably, the Farm Security Administration (FSA). He wore many hats as he also was a composer known for his use of Puerto Rican folk material, started a television production company, and was a cartoonist, poet, professor, and architectural designer.

== Early life ==
Delano was born Yakov Ovcharov to a Jewish family in Voroshylivka (now part of Hnivan urban hromada), Podolia Governorate, Russian Empire (now Ukraine). Delano, along with his parents and younger brother, emigrated to the United States in 1923. The family arrived in New York on July 5, 1923, on the SS Homeric, and settled in Philadelphia, Pennsylvania, soon after.

Between 1924 and 1932 Delano studied graphic arts/photography and music (viola and composition) as a scholarship student at the Settlement Music School. After graduating high school he attended the Pennsylvania Academy of the Fine Arts (PAFA) where he studied illustration and continued his musical training. While there, Delano was awarded the Cresson Traveling Scholarship, on which he chose to travel to Europe, where he bought a camera that got him interested in photography.

== Career ==
=== Farm Security Administration ===
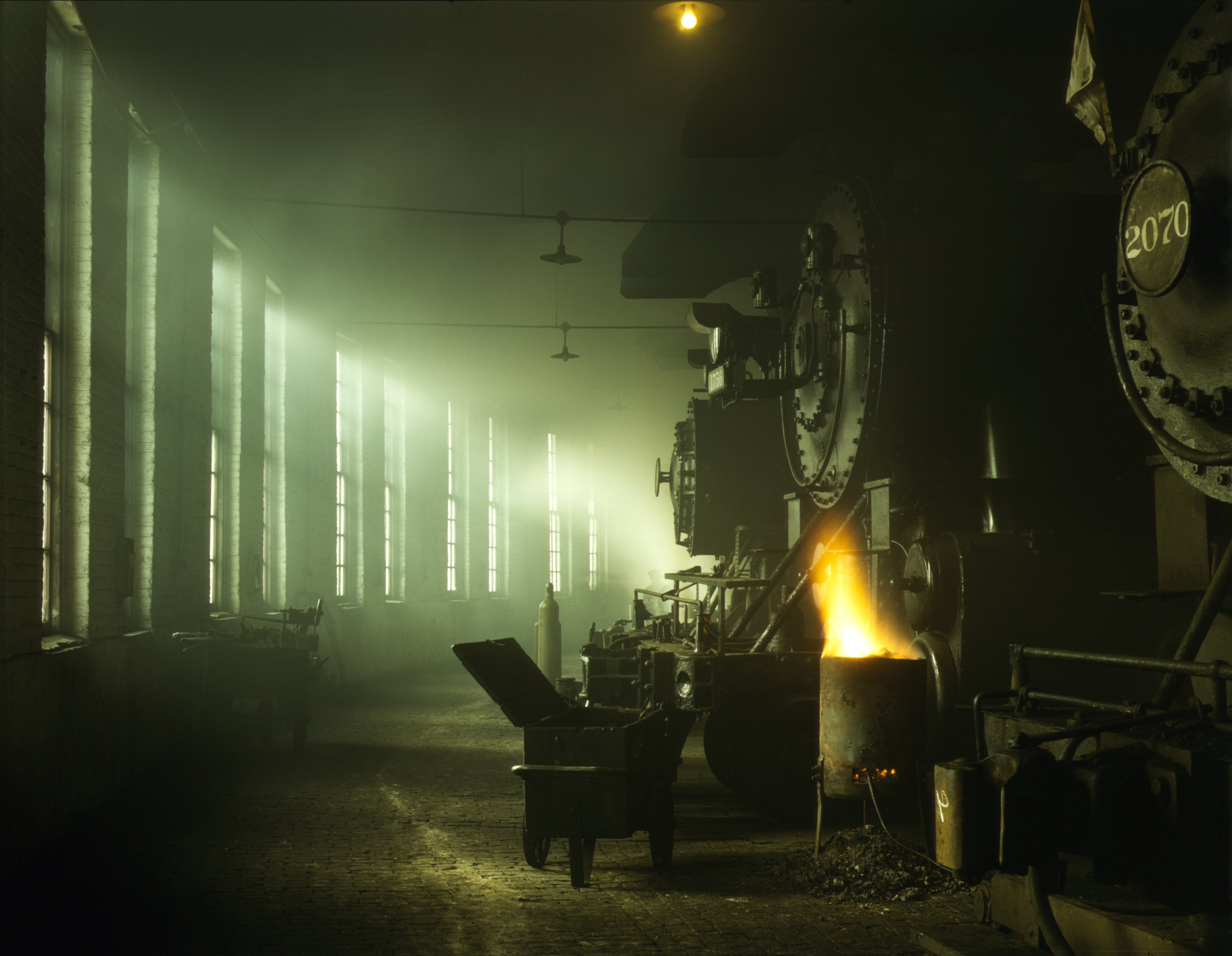
Delano captured a roundhouse at the Chicago railyards in 1942 for the Farm Security Administration Photography Program

After graduating from the PAFA, Delano found it difficult to secure a career in painting, illustrating, or music, so he decided to look into a photography program he had heard about through the Federal Art Project (FAP). He had moved to New York and had been freelancing as a photographer at the time, and decided to propose a photographic project to the FAP: a study of mining conditions in the Schuylkill County, Pennsylvania, anthracite coal area. Delano sent sample pictures to Roy Stryker and applied for a job at the Farm Security Administration Photography Program. Through the help of Edwin Rosskam and Marion Post Wolcott, Stryker offered Delano a job at $2,300/year in 1940. As a condition of the job, Delano had to have his own car and driver's license, both of which he acquired before moving to Washington, D.C.

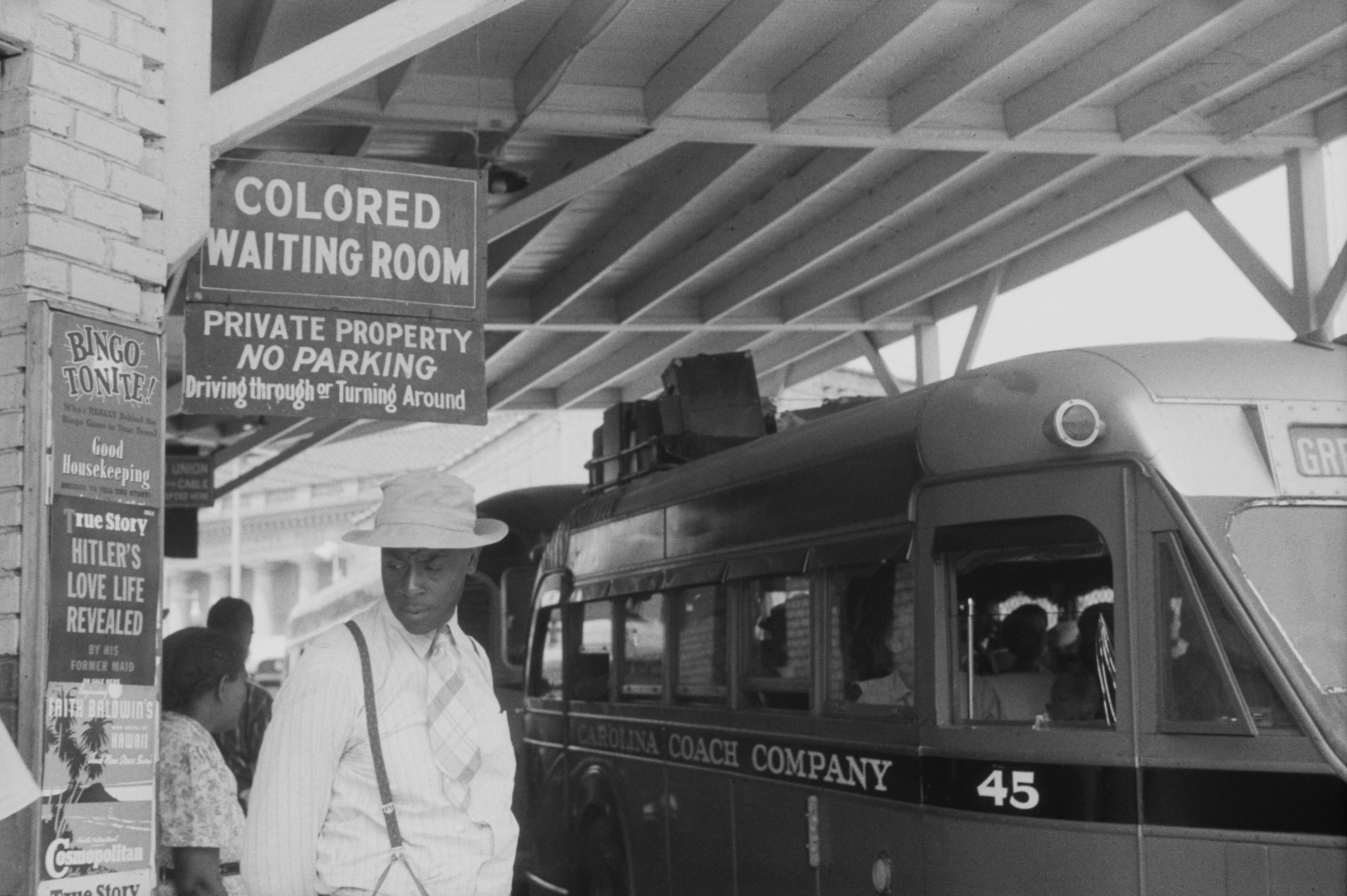
"At the bus station", during the segregation, Durham (NC), May 1940

Before working at the FSA, Delano had done his own processing and developing but did neither at the FSA. The FSA was created under the Roosevelt administration under the New Deal as a means to support small farmers and help restore the communities most affected by the depression. Many noteworthy photographers worked for the FSA until it was eliminated as "budget waste" in 1943 (including Esther Bubley, Marjory Collins, Walker Evans, Dorothea Lange, Russell Lee, Carl Mydans, Gordon Parks, Arthur Rothstein, Ben Shahn, John Vachon, and Marion Post Wolcott), but Delano’s work continually differed greatly from his colleagues. He generally focused more on cultural and social patterns of regions rather than focusing solely on the people and landscape.

=== World War II ===
By the time the United States entered World War II, Delano completed a number of photo essays on industry in America preparing for the war. He was then drafted into the United States Army Air Corps and served in the South Pacific from 1943 to 1946. Throughout his time in the military he continued documenting his experience by filming and photographing what he saw; much of his output remains classified to this day. He came home a captain and was determined to move to Puerto Rico with his wife, Irene (a second cousin to the painter and fellow photographer Ben Shahn), a land both of them had fallen in love with.

=== Move to Puerto Rico ===
Delano traveled to Puerto Rico in 1941 as a part of the FSA project. He was meant to spend a few days there on his way to the Virgin Islands, but his trip turned in to a few months due to the US declaring war after the Pearl Harbor bombing. This trip had such a profound influence on him that he settled there permanently in 1946. He mentioned being both fascinated and disturbed by the conditions he saw on the island, that he had never seen such intense poverty or met such kind people.

He became highly regarded on the island in time, and there were few Puerto Ricans who did not know who he was, or hadn't interacted with his work (illustrations, cartoons, movies, movies, musicals, etc.) in some way, frequently.

With his wife he worked in the Community Division of the Department of Public Education producing films, for many of which Delano composed the score. Delano also directed Los Peloteros, a Puerto Rican film about poor rural kids and their love for baseball. The film remains a classic in Puerto Rican cinema.

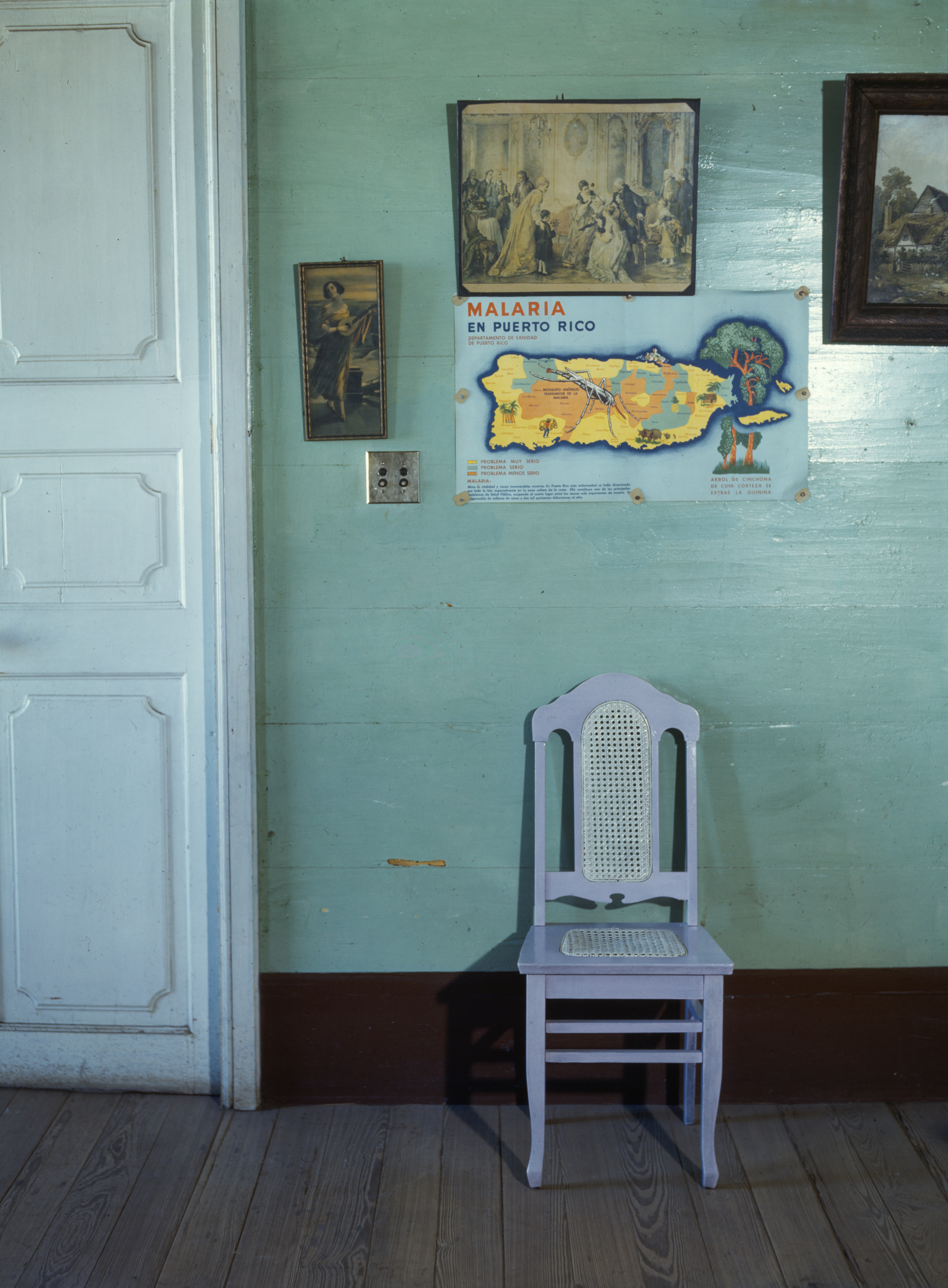
Malaria poster in small hotel, San Juan, Puerto Rico. Jack Delano, December 1941

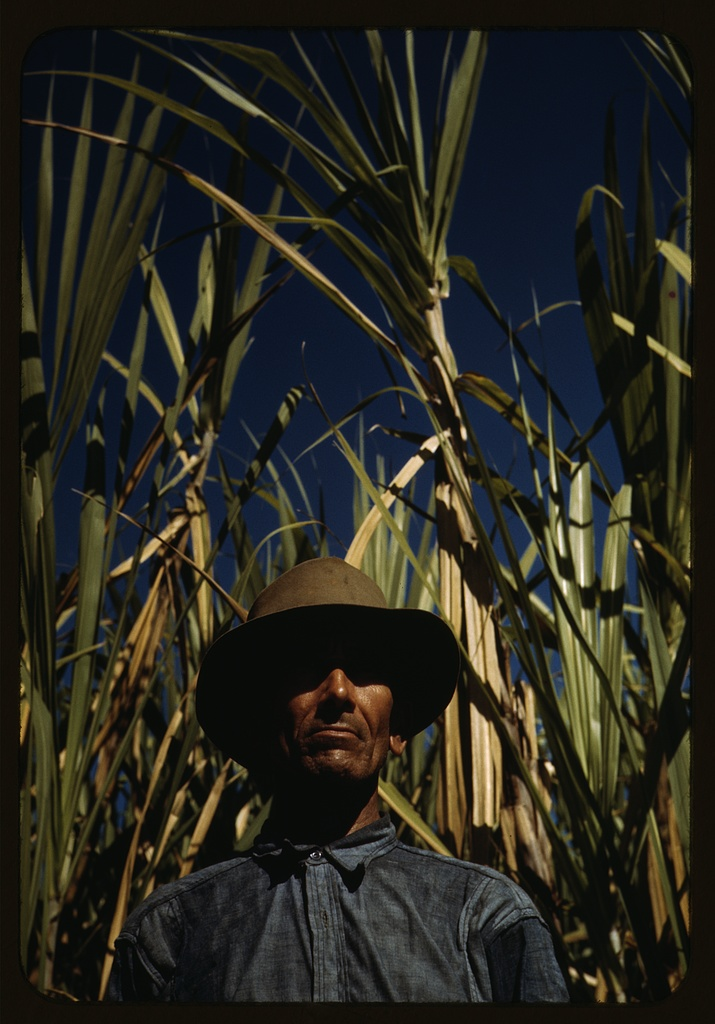
Farmer in Puerto Rico for the FSA, January 1942

=== Photography ===
C. & N.W. R.R., Mrs. Marcella Hart, mother of three children, employed as a wiper at the roundhouse, Clinton, Iowa. April 1943.

Delano's photography was highly regarded, not only for his unconventional subjects and locations, but because of his unconventional use of scale and proportion. This dramatically differentiated him from other FSA photographers. He used these techniques to dramatize the subject's presence and better underline the strength and character of the individual. He often took photos of the unsafe or poor conditions many individuals were living and working in. He used his photography to highlight the importance of the "average" person as well as expose the conditions many of them were working in, in both the coal mines and Puerto Rico.

=== Musical works ===
Delano's musical compositions included works of every type: orchestral (many composed for the Puerto Rico Symphony Orchestra), ballets (composed for Ballet Infantil de Gilda Navarra and Ballets de San Juan), chamber, choral (including Pétalo de rosa, a commission for Coro de Niños de San Juan) and solo vocal. His vocal music often showcases Puerto Rican poetry, especially the words of friend and collaborator Tomás Blanco. Blanco, Délano and his wife Irene collaborated on children's books. The most prominent of these remains a classic in Puerto Rican literature: The Child's Gift: A Twelfth Night Tale by Tomás Blanco, with illustrations by Irene Delano and incidental music (written on the margins) by Jack Delano. She also designed a book, by Lorenzo Homar and Rafael Tufiño, on the Puerto Rican folk music called Plena.

His score for the film Desde las nubes demonstrates an early use of electronic techniques. Most of his works composed after he moved to Puerto Rico are notable for using folk material in a classical form.

=== Public television ===
Delano, his wife Irene, and two of his friends from the FSA, Edwin and Louise Rosskam, helped to create the Cinema and Graphics Unit (CGU, now known as the Division of Community Education) of the Commission of Parks and Recreation when asked by the governor to create a platform that would use film and graphics to improve education in rural areas. In 1957, they then founded Puerto Rico's first publicly funded educational television station, WIPR where Jack also acted as a station producer, composer, and program director. This started Jack's slow move away from photography and into creating in other areas.

WIPR produced many notable programs, including “Puerto Rico: Workshop for the Americas” in 1961 which shed a light on the importance of Puerto Rican development to the Americas, touched on the difference between Cuba (under Fidel Castro) and Puerto Rico and how peaceful the island is, and even secured an exclusive interview with Puerto Rican governor Luis Muñoz Marín.

== Death ==
Jack Delano died after a short illness in San Juan on August 14, 1997, at age 83.

== Selected compositions ==
Orchestral

- Ofrenda Musical (Musical Offering) for viola, horn and string orchestra (1959)
- El sabio Doctor Mambú, Ballet for children (1962); libretto by the composer
- Concertino classico for C trumpet and small orchestra (1968)
- Sinfonietta for string orchestra (1983)

Chamber and instrumental music

- Sonata in A minor for viola and piano (1953)
- Sonata for violin solo (1960)
- Sonatina for flute and piano (1965)
- String Quartet (1984)
- Tres preludios (3 Preludes) for piano (1985)
- "Aves" −10 piezas breves para piano (Rio Piedras, Puerto Rico 1987); Vocal
- Esta luna es mía for soprano solo, female chorus and piano (1962); words by José P.H. Hernández
- Me voy a Ponce for mixed chorus (1965); words by José Agustín Balseiro
- Tres cancioncitas del mar for medium voice and piano (1969); words by Nimia Vicéns, Ester Feliciano Mendoza and Carmelina Vizcarrondo
- Cuatro sones de la tierra for voice and piano (1974); words by Tomás Blanco
- Pétalo de rosa, Suite for a cappella children's choir (1993); written for the San Juan Children's Choir

Film scores

- Los Peloteros (1953)

Discography

- Al menos cantos (2022), released by Lexicon Classics, showcases 16 songs by Jack Délano, featuring mezzo-soprano Laura Virella, pianist Alla Milchtein and cellist Kate Dillingham.

== Gallery ==
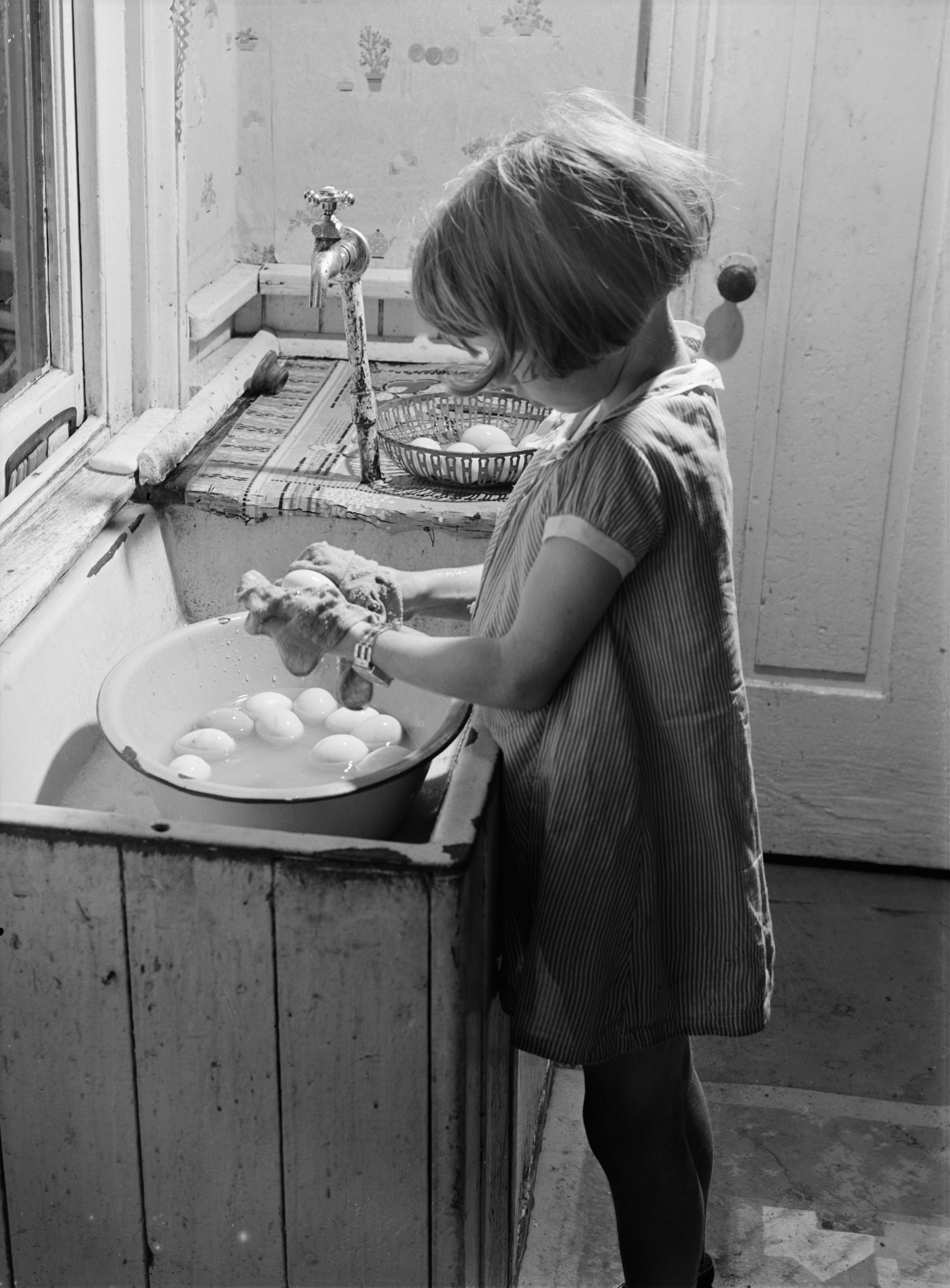
"Washing eggs to be sold at Tri-County Farmers Co-op Market at Du Bois, Pennsylvania", August 1940

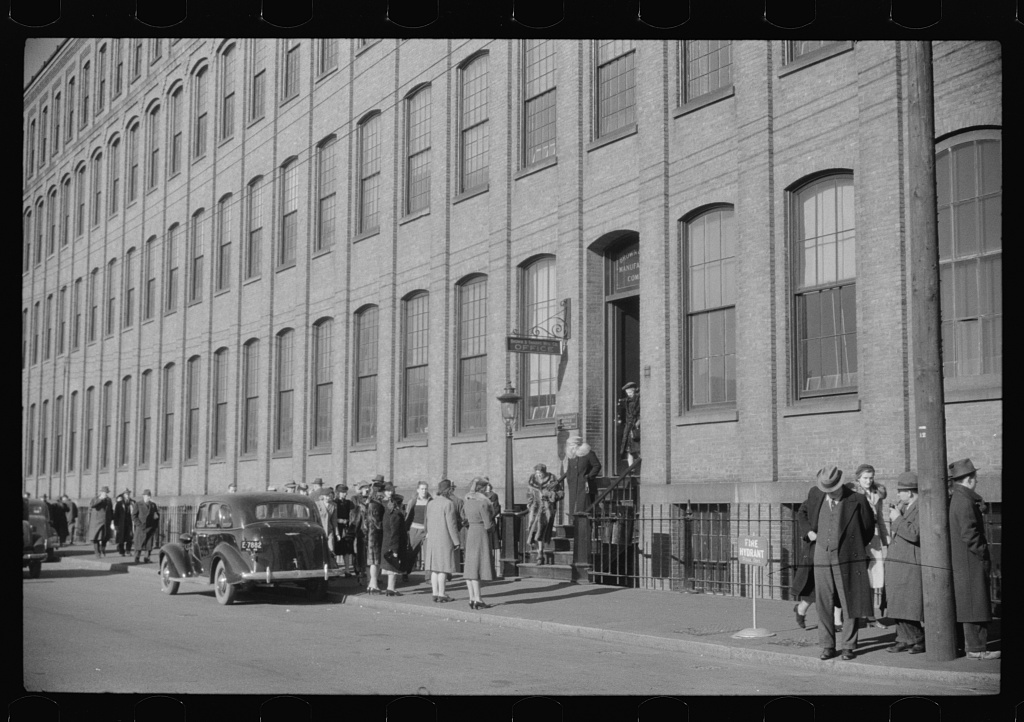
"Employees leaving Brown & Sharpe Manufacturing Company, Providence, Rhode Island", December 1940

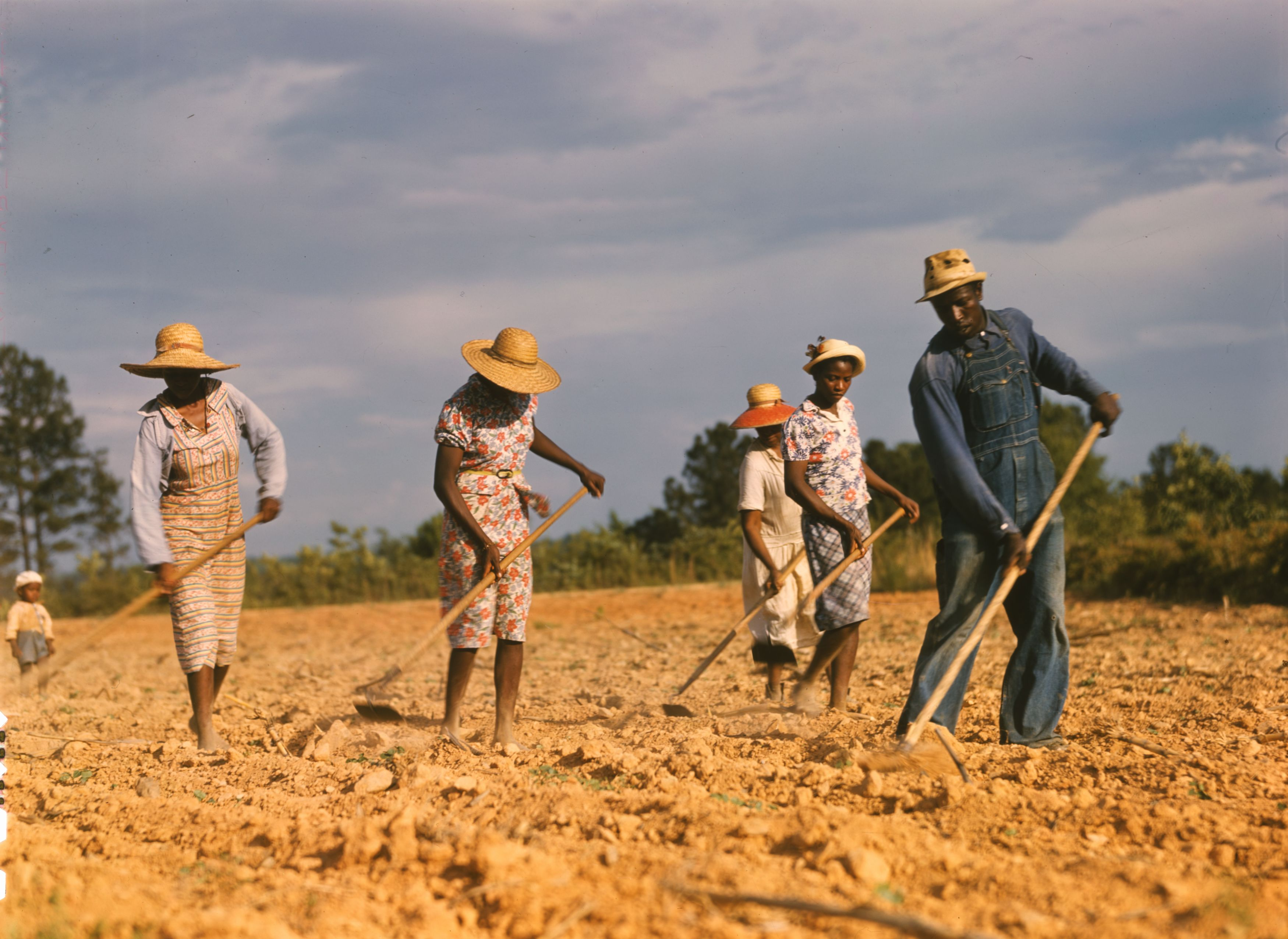
"Chopping cotton on rented land near White Plains," Greene County, GA. June 1941

"Street scene, Christiansted," St. Croix, Virgin Islands. December 1941

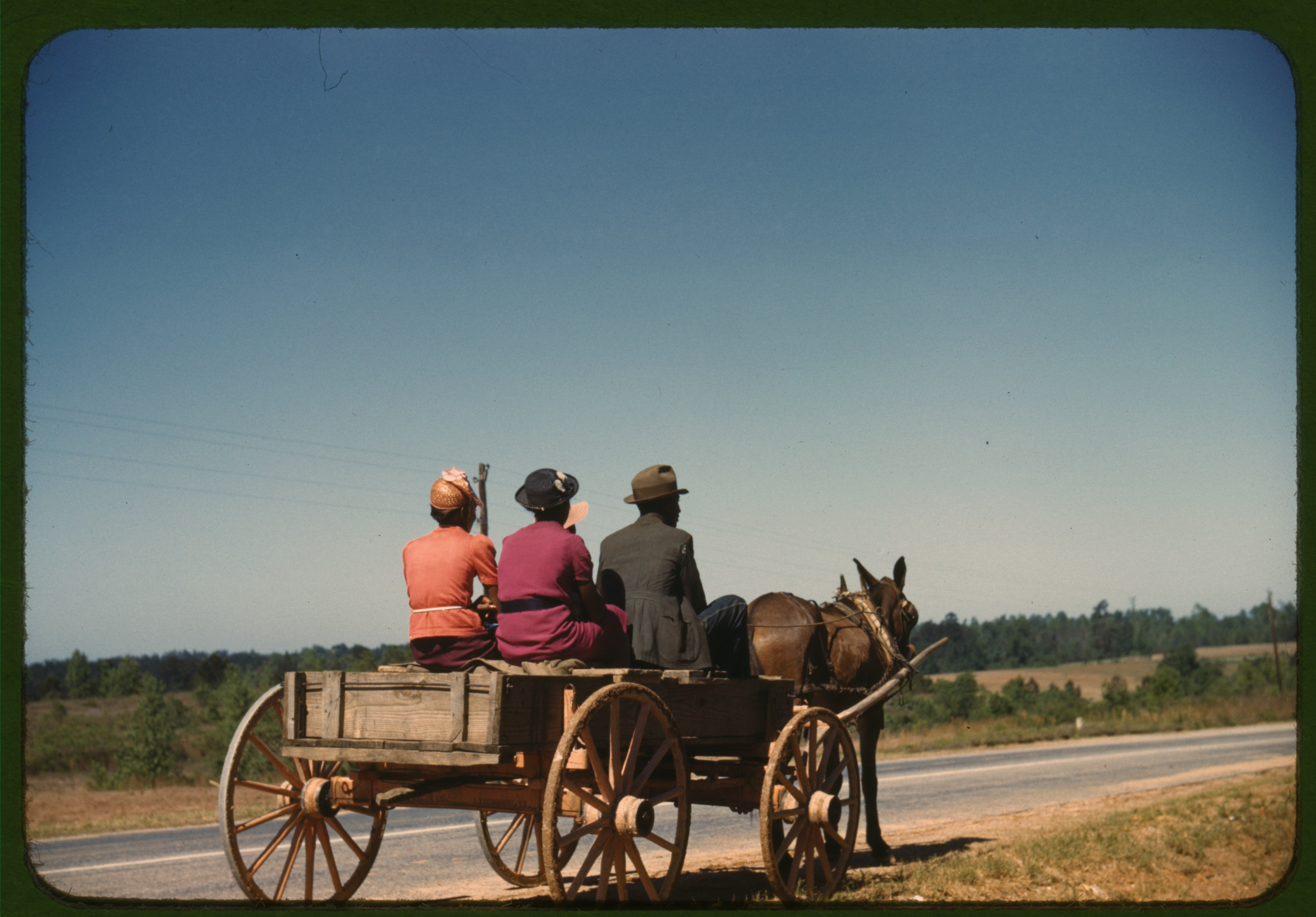
"Going to town on Saturday afternoon," Greene Co., Ga. May 1941.

"FSA borrower who lives in village La Vallee, St. Croix island, Virgin Islands." Dec 1941

"Sugar cane worker and his woman", Rio Piedras, Puerto Rico. December 1941

"FSA - Tenant Purchase borrowers? by their house", Puerto Rico. December 1941

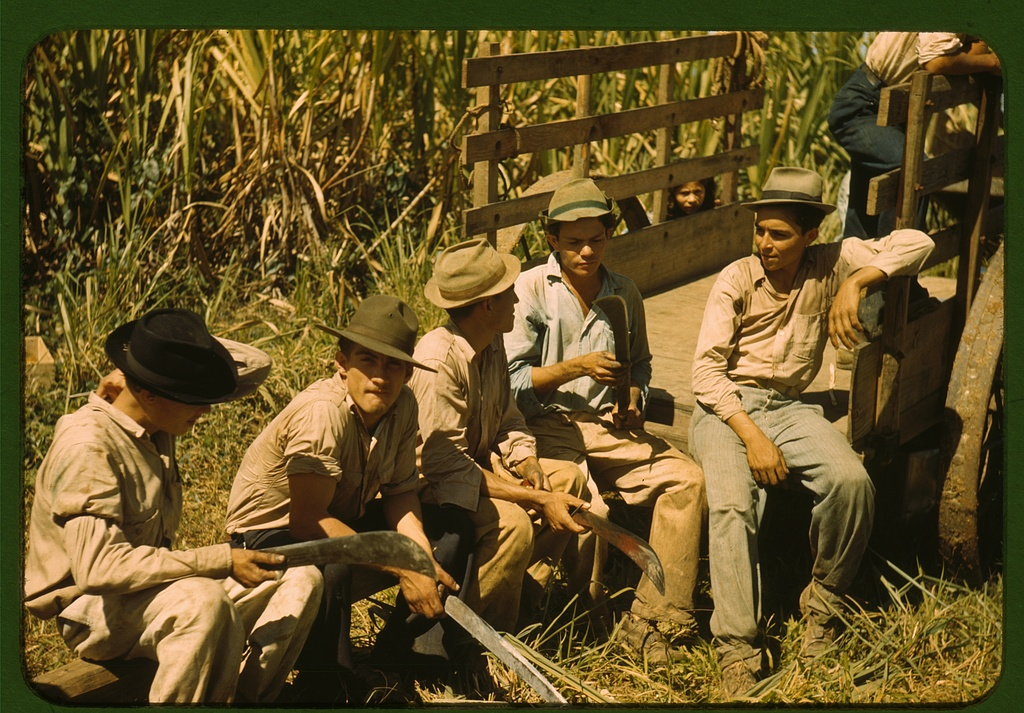
Sugar cane workers resting, Puerto Rico, December 1941

"Sugar cane workers resting at the noon hour," Rio Piedras, Puerto Rico. December 1941

"Small farms in the southwest," Puerto Rico, Jan 1942.

"Queen of Wellstown," Chicago, March 1942

Newsboy selling The Chicago Defender, April 1942

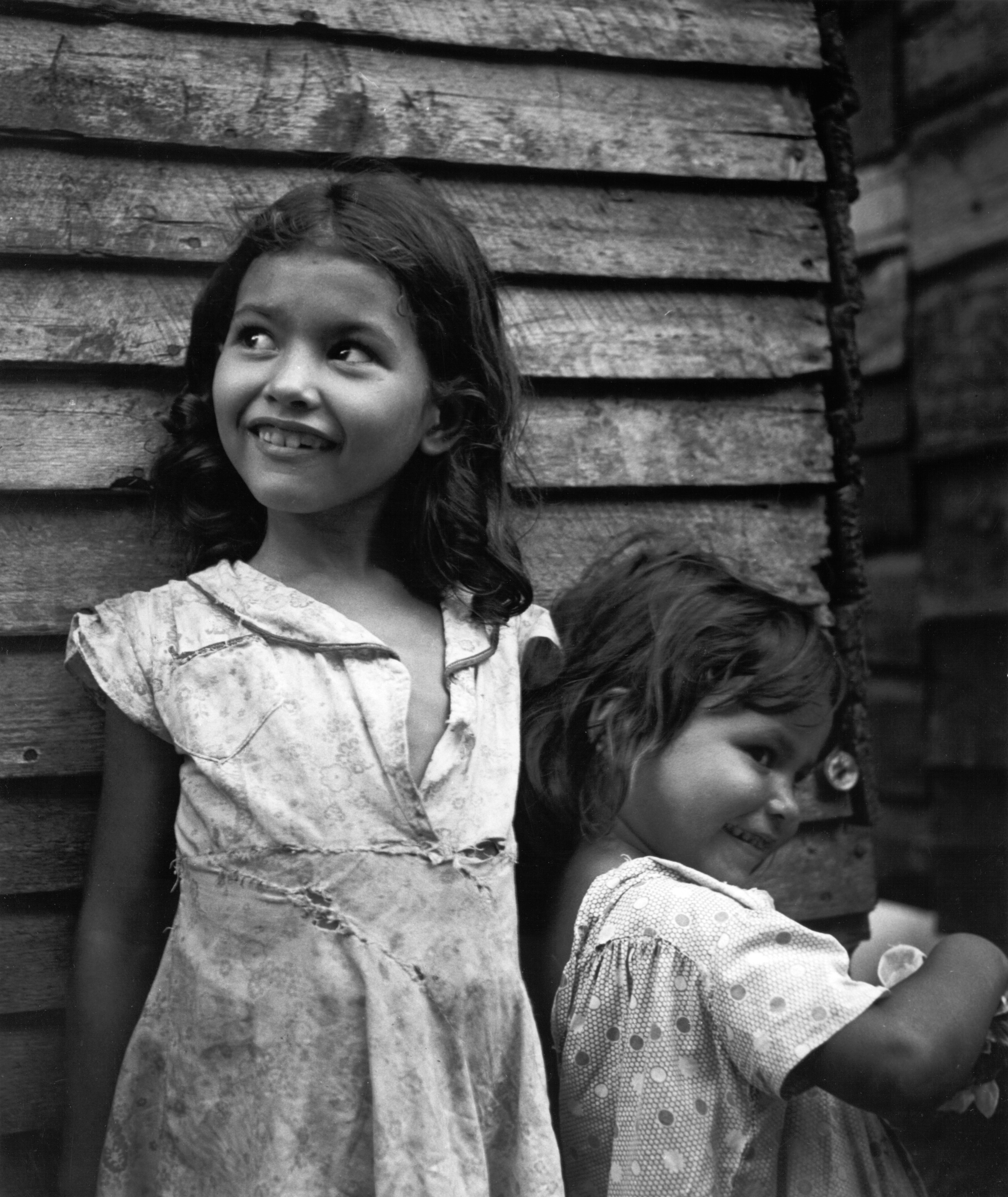
"Children in Utuado, Puerto Rico", May 1942

Chicago, Illinois. Frank Williams, working on the car repair tracks at an Illinois Central Railroad yard, November 1942

Melrose Park (near Chicago), Ill.; C & NW RR [i.e. Chicago and North Western railroad]; Roy Nelin, a box packer in the roundhouse at the Proviso yard. December 1942

"Chicago and North Western railroad," William London has been a railroad worker 25 years - now working at the roundhouse at the Proviso yards. December 1942

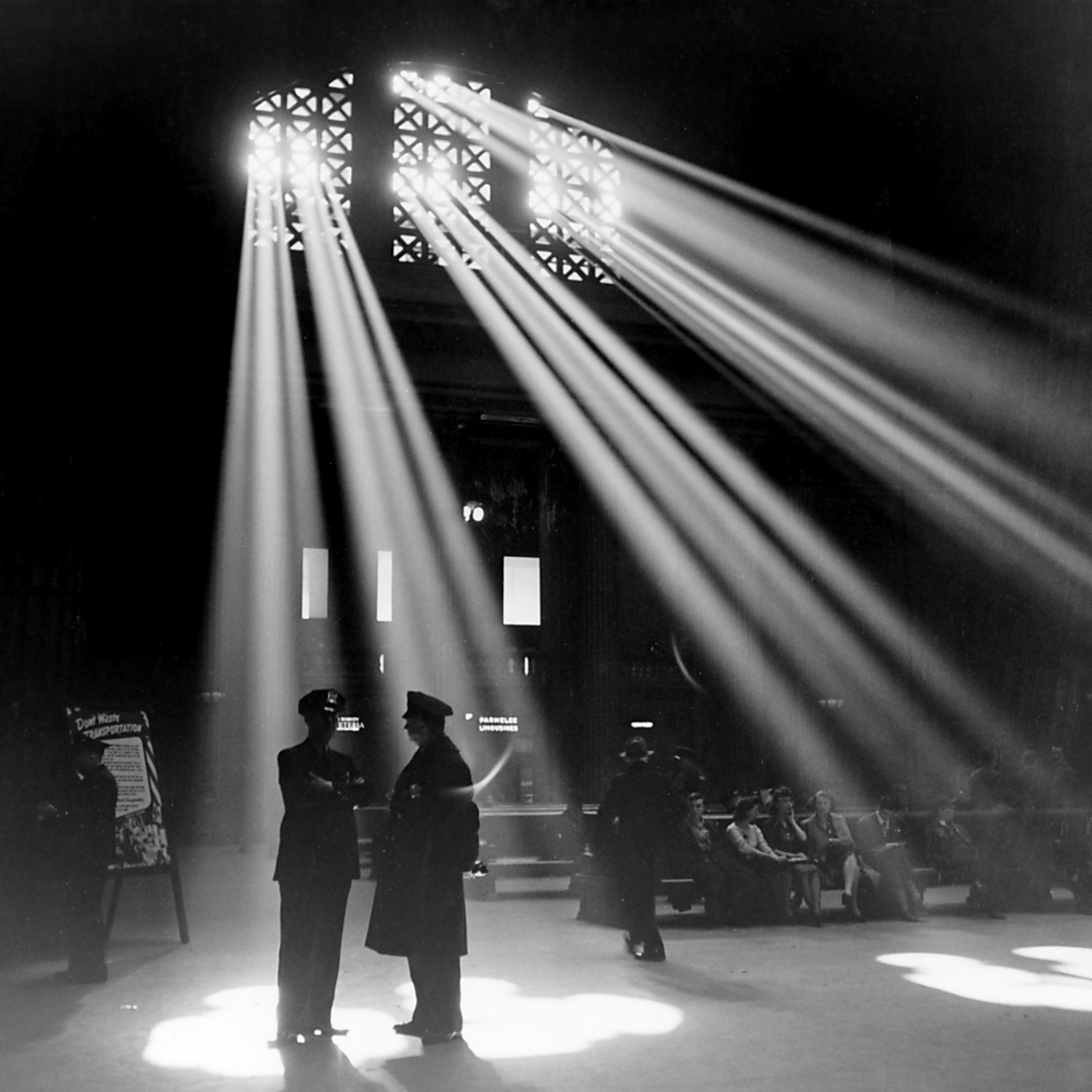
One of Delano's most famous pictures, of Chicago Union Station, January 1943

"Loading oranges into refrigerator car at a co-op orange packing plant," March 1943

Atchison, Topeka, and Santa Fe railroad conductor George E. Burton and engineer J.W. Edwards comparing time before pulling out of Corwith railroad yard for Chillicothe, Illinois; Chicago. March 1943.

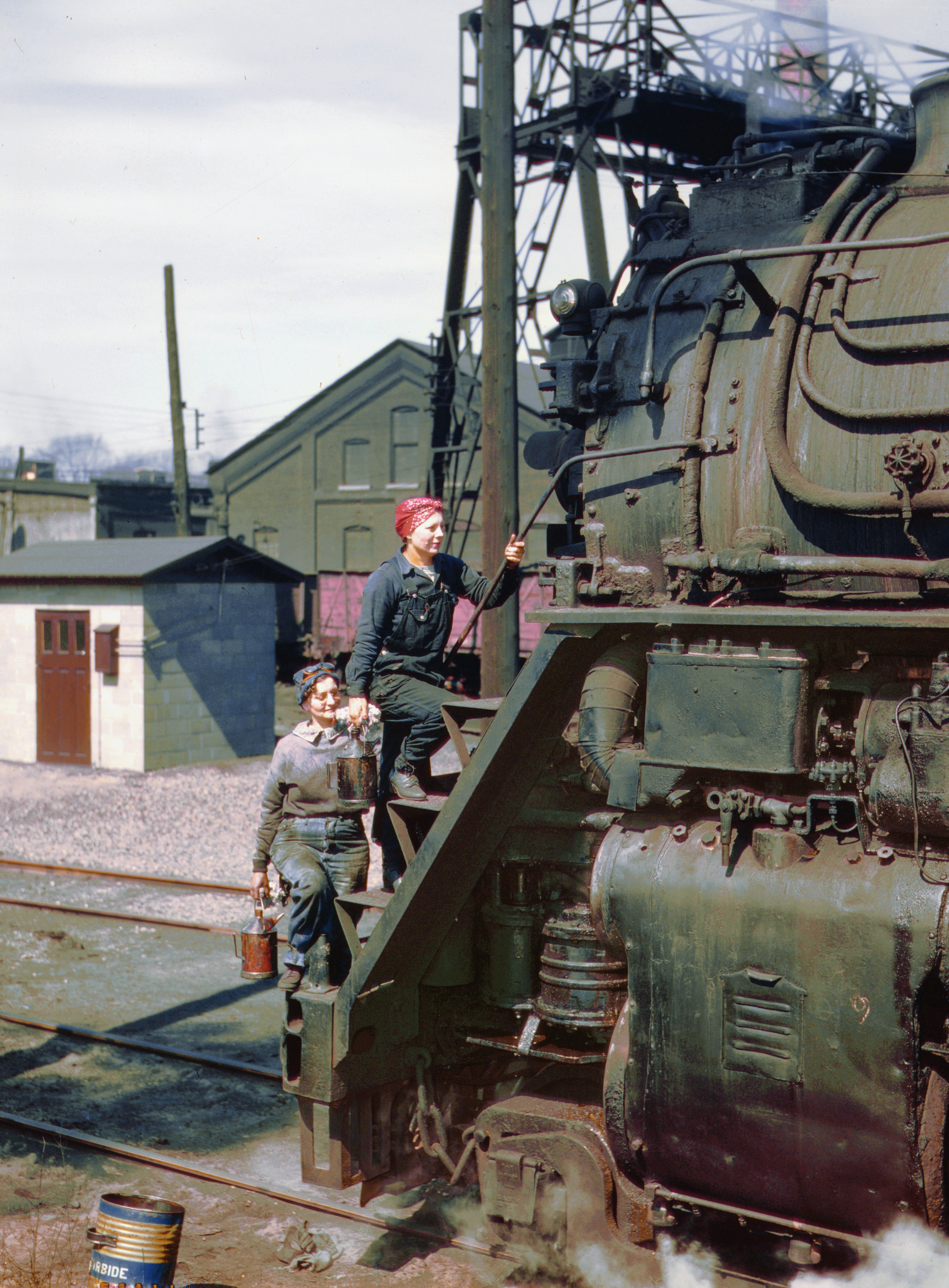
Women wipers of the Chicago and North Western Railroad cleaning one of the giant 4-8-4 "Northern" H-class steam locomotives, Clinton, Iowa, April 1943

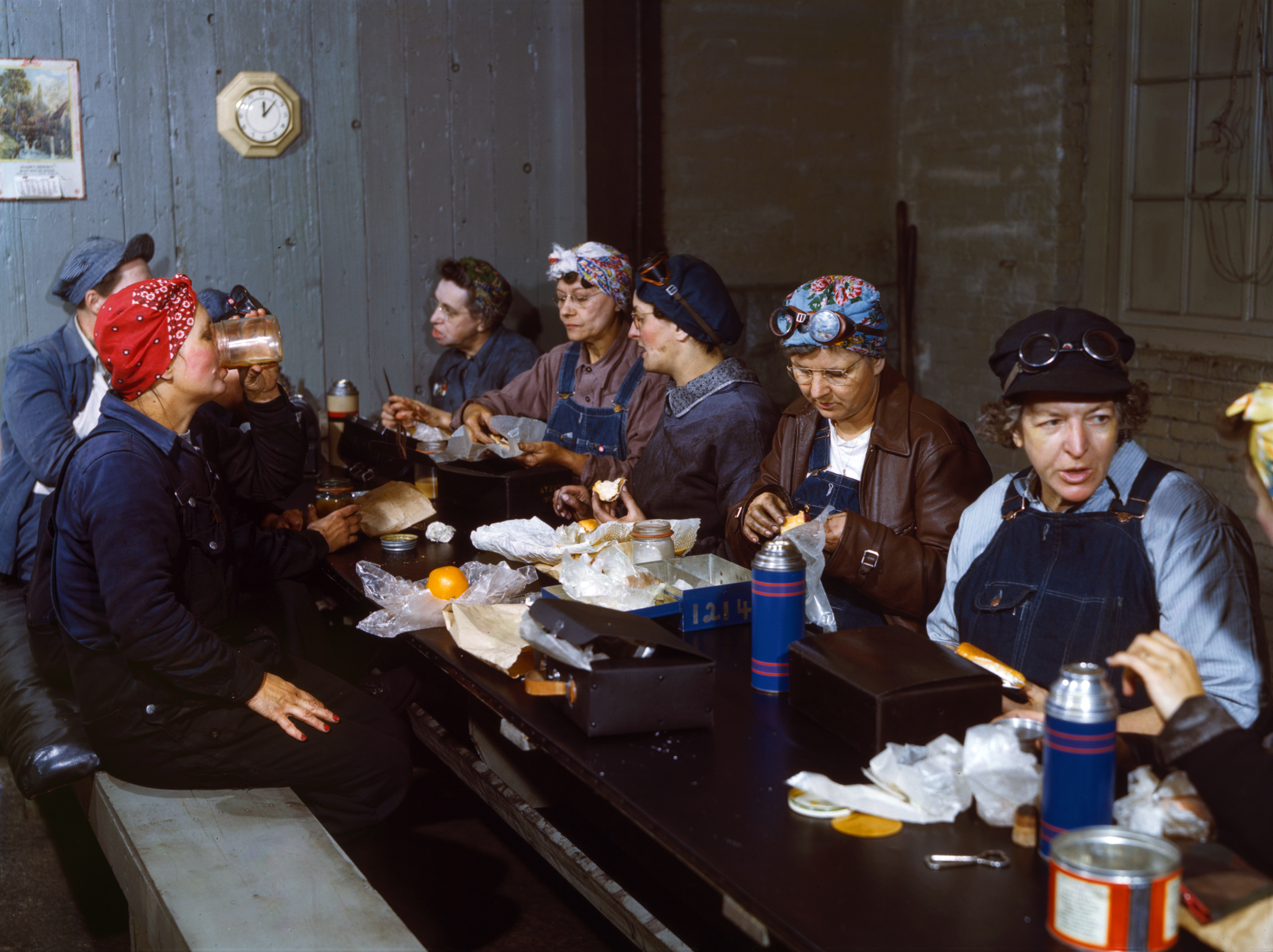
Roundhouse wipers at lunch, Clinton, Iowa, April 1943

== Bibliography ==
- H. Wiley Hitchcock and Stanley Sadie (eds), New Grove Dictionary of American Music, (London: Macmillan Press, 1986), volume 1, p 595.
- Composers of the Americas: biographical data and catalogs of their works, (Washington: Secretaría General, Organización de los Estados Americanos), volume 19, pp 22–27.
