= Roy Niederhoffer =

American hedge fund manager (born 1966)

Roy Gary Niederhoffer
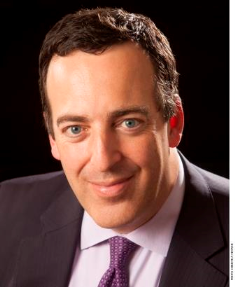
- Born: 1966 (age 59–60); Great Neck, New York
- Education: Harvard College (BA in computational neuroscience, magna cum laude, 1987)
- Occupations: Hedge fund manager and philanthropist
- Years active: 1987–present
- Employer(s): R. G. Niederhoffer Capital Management, Inc. (President)
- Known for: Founder of R. G. Niederhoffer Capital Management, Inc. (1993); Founder of Niederhoffer Foundation
- Spouse: Jenny Niederhoffer
- Relatives: Hedge fund manager Victor Niederhoffer (brother)

Roy Gary Niederhoffer (born 1966) is an American hedge fund manager. He graduated from Harvard College magna cum laude in 1987, with a BA in computational neuroscience.

== Bio ==
In 1993 he founded R. G. Niederhoffer Capital Management, Inc., (RGNCM), a hedge fund known as a managed futures fund or commodity futures trading company, and he serves as its president. The hedge fund invests in public equity, fixed income, currency, and commodity markets across the globe, as well as in derivatives including spot currencies, futures contracts, forward contracts, swaps, and options. From its inception in 1993 through May 2009, it had annualized returns of approximately 12%, over twice the average of the market (+60% in 2000, and +51% in 2008—when the S&P 500 was down 37%). From 1999 through March 2009, the firm's annualized gain exceeded 17%. In May 2009 Barrons reported that the fund ranked ninth in its survey of the top 100 hedge funds. His firm was noted for strong performance during the 2008 financial crisis. As of April 2016, the fund had earned an annualized 18.73% since it was started. As of June 2016, the firm's assets under management were $900 million. As of June 2017, the annualized fund returns dropped to 3.58%.

Niederhoffer uses an investment strategy known as short-term trading. He developed his strategy after tracking and analyzing short-term trading patterns. He wrote the original source code to test and run his complicated, high-frequency, automatic-trading strategy in over 50 financial and commodity markets in developed countries. His company uses quantitative analysis to decide upon its investments, obtaining external research to complement its own in-house research. He is of the view that movements in stock, currency, and commodity prices lead to patterns of short-term investor responses that can be anticipated.

Niederhoffer is a former chairman of the board of the New York City Opera (NYCO), which presents opera at the Rose Theater at Jazz at Lincoln Center and other venues around New York City, and was chairman of NYCO Renaissance, a group that revived the NYCO after a two-year shutdown, in January 2016. He created the Niederhoffer Foundation, which is active in music education, Jewish causes, and delivering aid to the needy. Niederhoffer serves as chairman of the board of directors of The Harmony Program, which provides daily music lessons and free musical instruments to over 200 New York City Public School and Long Island students in under-served areas, and the Concert Artists Guild. He has also served on the board of the Kaufman Center (consisting of the Special Music School, Lucy Moses School, and Merkin Concert Hall). He delivered relief to victims of Hurricane Sandy in 2012, saying "We can't rely on the government for all of this." In October 2015, Niederhoffer was presented with the Johanna and Leslie Garfield Award for Arts Philanthropy at the New York Youth Symphony's 53rd Annual Benefit Gala. Niederhoffer is also a violinist with and founding member of the Park Avenue Chamber Symphony. He was also the Executive Producer of The Flying Karamazov Brothers, which played Off-Broadway in 2010 and in London's West End in 2011.

== Early life and family ==
Niederhoffer was born and raised in Great Neck, New York. His paternal great-grandparents had moved from Austria to the Lower East Side of Manhattan in the late 1800s. His paternal grandfather Martin (Martie), an accountant and court interpreter, married Birdie (née Kuminsky) in 1916. His maternal grandparents were Sam and Gertrude Eisenberg.

His father, Dr. Arthur "Artie" Niederhoffer (1917–1981), graduated from Brooklyn College in 1937, and then from Brooklyn Law School, and finally with a Ph.D. from New York University (1963). His father served in the New York City Police Department for 21 years (retiring as a lieutenant), and then taught as a professor of sociology at John Jay College of Criminal Justice for 14 years. His father also taught at Hofstra University, Brooklyn College, New York University, Queens College, and the New York City Police Academy, authored several books on the police and criminology including Behind the Shield, The Ambivalent Force, The Gang, and The Police Family: From Station House to Ranch House (co-authored with his wife), and was awarded the President's Medal of John Jay College for his achievements in criminal justice. His mother, Elaine (née Eisenberg) Niederhoffer (1925–2006), was an English teacher, author, and editor who had descended from a long line of rabbis.

He had a brother, Victor Niederhoffer (1943–2026), a hedge fund manager and former five-time United States squash singles champion. He also has a sister, Dr. Diane Niederhoffer Klein, a clinical psychologist. Niederhoffer grew up without a television in his home. He is the uncle of director and author Galt Niederhoffer. He is married to Jenny Niederhoffer, and the family lives on the Upper West Side in Manhattan.

== Education and early entrepreneurship ==
Niederhoffer attended Great Neck South High School, where he was co-editor of the school paper, The Southerner. He graduated in 1983.

=== Microvations ===
At age 13, when he was a high school sophomore, Niederhoffer (as president) and classmate Evan Grossman founded a company called Software Innovations, which sold computer games such as Alien Invasion that operated on the Radio Shack TRS-80 microcomputer. They created a mailing list of over 3,000 computer owners, sold shares in the company to their teachers and friends, borrowed money from their families, and printed a six-page mail order catalog listing their programs for sale, along with programs created by friends and other companies. SoftSide Magazine named the 13-year-old Niederhoffer their Programmer of the Month in November 1979.

In March 1982, Money Magazine wrote about them. The owner of a large record company then contacted them, and suggested that the then-high-school-juniors form a joint venture with his company. They struck a deal in which they agreed to supply the record company with computer games, in return for an initial fee and a per-game commission. They hired lawyers, and that year while Niederhoffer was 16 they changed the company's name to Microvations, Inc. It soon thereafter employed over 30 people, mostly his classmates and friends whom they subcontracted to program games and keep books, and produced over 450 individual titles by 1983, which were sold at stores such as Sears, K-Mart, and Woolworth's. Because they were too young to drive a car, they hired a driver to pick up finished programs and run errands. They dissolved the company when Niederhoffer and Grossman left to attend college at Harvard, though Niederhoffer's interest in computers continued.

=== College ===
Niederhoffer then attended Harvard College, where as a freshman he was interested in biology, psychology, and social relations. He graduated magna cum laude in 1987, with a BA in computational neuroscience, the study of how the brain processes information and makes decisions.

== Career ==
=== R. G. Niederhoffer Capital Management ===
Following university, Niederhoffer worked for his brother Victor Niederhoffer and his hedge fund from 1987 to 1992, trading fixed income securities. Hedge fund manager Monroe Trout and commodities trader Toby Crabel worked at the hedge fund at the same time.

He then opened R. G. Niederhoffer Capital Management, Inc. (RGNCM), a hedge fund known as a managed futures fund or commodity futures trading company. He began trading in July 1993, investing as a contrarian in major financial and commodity markets. The fund is a registered Commodity Trading Advisor, Commodity Pool Operator, and a member of the National Futures Association. It is based in New York City, and he serves as its president.

RGNCM is a hedge fund sponsor, and is employee-owned. It invests in public equity, fixed income, currency, and commodity markets across the globe, as well as in derivatives including spot currencies, futures contracts, forward contracts, swaps, and options. The company uses quantitative analysis to decide upon its investments, obtaining external research to complement its own in-house research. RGNCM mainly provides services to pooled investment vehicles, as well as corporations, and manages separate client-focused portfolios.

In its earliest years in the 1990s, RGNCM slumped during the internet bubble. From its establishment through 1999, his firm's returns were essentially flat.

This led Niederhoffer to adopt dozens of new trading rules, and to diversify by balancing his positions with various momentum plays. He also added individual stocks to his portfolio, from the 800 most-liquid US and European stocks. His revised approach led to a notable improvement in the firm's performance: from 1999 through March 2009, the firm's compound annualized gain exceeded 17%.

The R. G. Niederhoffer Diversified Program returned +60% in 2000, and +51% in 2008 (when the S&P 500 was down 37%). Overall it had long-term returns over +17% annualized return from 1999 through March 2009. In May 2009, Barron's reported that the fund ranked 9th in its survey of the top 100 hedge funds. From its inception in 1993 through May 2009, it had annualized returns of approximately 12%, over twice the average of the market. As of May 2009, the program had five-year annualized returns of 13.7% (compared with an average hedge fund gain of 2.51%, and an average S&P decline of -4.76%). His firm was noted for strong performance during the 2008 financial crisis.

As of April 2016, his fund had earned an annualized 18.73% since it was started. As of June 2016, the firm's assets under management were $900 million.

As of November 30, 2022, the flagship fund of R.G. Niederhoffer Capital Management was up 79% for the year; in contrast, the S&P 500 was down 19% for the year. That fund accounted for about 40% of its $1 billion in assets.

==== Trading strategy ====
Niederhoffer uses an investment strategy known as short-term trading. He developed his strategy after tracking and analyzing short-term trading patterns. He wrote the original source code to test and run his complicated, high-frequency, automatic-trading strategy in over fifty financial and commodity markets in developed countries.

He is of the view that movements in stock, currency, and commodity prices lead to patterns of short-term investor responses that can be anticipated. Niederhoffer's computerized trading models are based on a belief in the presence of cognitive biases in the human brain, which in his view cause investors and the models they create to behave predictably. He believes that other short-term investors generally engage in certain predictable behavior: they overemphasize recent experience when they make decisions, they hate to lose even more than they love to win, their behavior becomes increasingly predictable as markets become more volatile, and when the investors are emotional they engage in herd-like behavior and sell stocks when they are at their lowest level and buy stocks when they are at their highest level. The firm's trading models do not focus on company fundamentals or macroeconomic trends.

Niederhoffer's computer models analyze the real-time data as it comes in, such as volume and price of every major market and most of the largest stocks. The models make decisions as to what the probability is that a particular market may rise or fall over a period of the next few hours, to the next few days. As with the way an airplane is flown, the models are flown by auto-pilot most of the time, with a pilot watching over them to make corrections if need be. The models focus among other things not just on the price of a security, but on the path that a price has taken to get to where it is. They are premised on the notion that to be effective, the quantitative strategy must be applied and the emotion of the trader has to be stripped from the process. Niederhoffer's strategy thrives on volatility, because it brings out emotional, predictable herd behavior in investors.

His firm's trades generally range in duration from less than an hour to five to ten days, averaging a day and a half. Niederhoffer's program seeks to decrease its risk when the amount it could lose goes past certain thresholds, and his firm's risk management committee can override the program to reduce risk when it feels it is appropriate, at times by buying options.

==== Awards ====
- R. G. Niederhoffer Capital Management, Inc., was Futures Magazine Top Trader of 2000.
- Roy G. Niederhoffer Negative Correlation Fund was the Absolute Return Managed Futures Fund of the Year in 2008, when it returned 55%, and the Diversified Fund Offshore was also nominated for its 2008 performance of 51%.
- R. G. Niederhoffer Diversified Fund Offshore was the HFM Week Magazine Managed Futures Fund of the Year in 2008.
- R. G. Niederhoffer Diversified Fund Offshore was ranked #9 of the Top 100 Hedge Funds by Barrons in 2009, and #42 in 2010.
- Roy G. Niederhoffer Optimal Alpha Fund, Ltd., RGNCM, won the 2016 Investors Choice CTA Fund Long-Term Performance Award.
- Roy G. Niederhoffer Diversified Offshore Fund, RGNCM, was a nominee for the 2016 Investors Choice CTA Fund of 2015 Award.

== Musical and theatre pursuits ==
Niederhoffer, who began training to play the violin at the age of four, is a violinist with and founding member of the Park Avenue Chamber Symphony, and has performed with the symphony in Carnegie Hall, Avery Fisher Hall, and Alice Tully Hall. He is also a classical and jazz pianist. In addition, Niederhoffer was the Executive Producer of The Flying Karamazov Brothers, which played Off-Broadway in 2010 and in London's West End in 2011.

== Philanthropy ==
Niederhoffer is a former chairman of the board of the New York City Opera (NYCO), which presents opera at the Rose Theater at Jazz at Lincoln Center and other venues around New York City. He was a board member of the NYCO when the company filed for bankruptcy in October 2013. For the next two years, he (as chairman) and Michael Capasso (now general director of NYCO) led an effort, called NYCO Renaissance, Ltd., to revive the company. The finances of the group were supported by a $1.35 million pledge by Niederhoffer. After a protracted legal battle, in January 2016 Niederhoffer and Capasso's effort was approved by the creditors of NYCO as well as the NY State Attorney General to reorganize and revive the company. NYCO resumed performing on January 20, 2016. Niederhoffer resigned from the NYCO Board in February 2019 for personal reasons, to focus on his growing business and young family.

Niederhoffer serves as chairman of the board of directors of The Harmony Program, which provides daily music lessons and free musical instruments to over 200 New York City Public School and Long Island students in under-served areas, and the Concert Artists Guild. He has also been on the board of the Kaufman Center (consisting of the Special Music School, Lucy Moses School, and Merkin Concert Hall), and created the Niederhoffer Foundation, which is active in music education, Jewish causes, and providing aid to the needy.

Niederhoffer delivered relief to victims of Hurricane Sandy in 2012, saying "We can't rely on the government for all of this." Beginning the week of the storm, he organized hundreds of volunteers and corporate donors including Fairway, Inc., and Exxel Outdoor Products, who distributed tons of food, supplies, generators, and sleeping bags to residents of Rockaway, Queens and elsewhere. For his efforts, in 2013 Niederhoffer received the Lehman-LaGuardia Award from the NY Grand Lodge Order of the Sons of Italy in America and the Metro North region of B'nai B'rith.

In October 2015, Niederhoffer was presented with the Johanna and Leslie Garfield Award for Arts Philanthropy at the New York Youth Symphony's 53rd Annual Benefit Gala.
