= Roni Ben-Hur =

Israeli jazz guitarist (born 1962)

Roni Ben-Hur רוני בן-חור
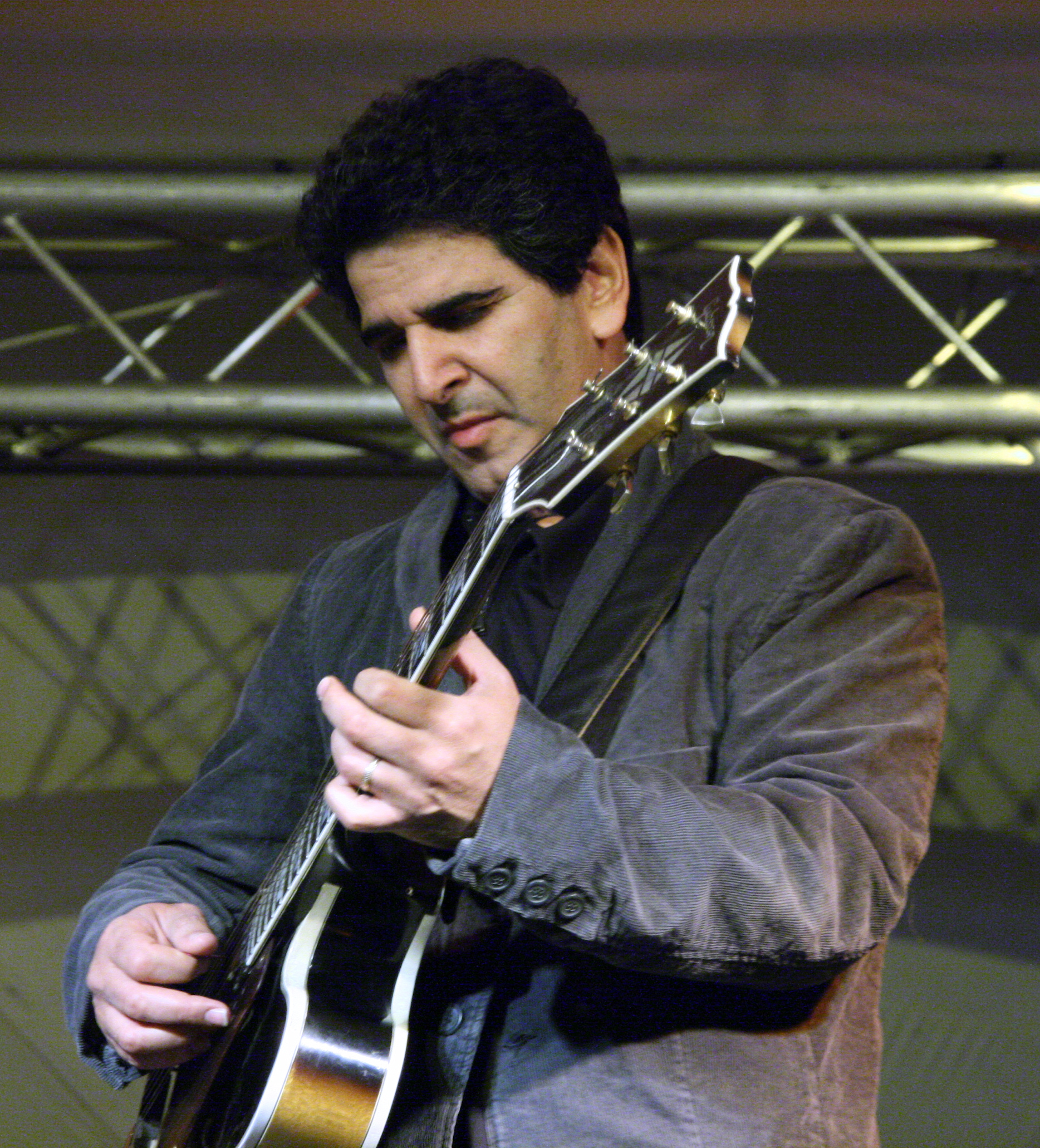
- Roni Ben-Hur

Background information
- Born: Roni Bohobza; July 9, 1962 (age 64); Dimona, Israel
- Origin: Tel Aviv, Israel
- Genres: Jazz, Latin jazz
- Occupation: Musician
- Instrument: Guitar
- Years active: 1981–present
- Labels: TCB, Reservoir, Motéma
- Website: ronibenhur.com

Roni Ben-Hur (Hebrew: רוני בן-חור) is an Israeli jazz guitarist who immigrated to the United States in 1985. His parents were Tunisian-Jewish from Tunisia.

== Biography ==
Roni Bohobza grew up in Dimona, Israel. He is the youngest of seven children and one of two born after the family emigrated from Tunisia in 1955. His surname was legally changed to Ben-Hur via ritual at age 10.

When he was eleven, he started playing guitar. He learned about jazz from a high school friend's record collection. In Israel he performed in clubs and at weddings and bar mitzvahs until he had enough money to move to the U.S. He arrived in New York City in 1985, spending time at Barry Harris's Jazz Cultural Theater. He took lessons from Harris, then became a member of his band.

Ben-Hur's experience as an educator dates back to 1981 in Israel. In the U.S. he started jazz music programs at Professional Performing Arts School, the Coalition School for Social Change, and at the Lucy Moses School. At the request of Bette Midler, he started a jazz program for New York City high schools. Ben-Hur began a jazz camp in Saint-Cézaire-sur-Siagne, France, with Santi Debriano. With Nilson Matta, he began a jazz and Brazilian music camp in Bar Harbor, Maine, both intended for adult jazz amateurs. He is the founding director of the jazz program at the Lucy Moses School at Kaufman Center in Manhattan where he teaches.

His book Talk Jazz: Guitar (Mel Bay, 2004) includes a CD with a removable guitar track of Ben-Hur performing the exercises in the book with Tardo Hammer on piano, Earl May on bass, and Leroy Williams on drums.

His album Anna's Dance was named by The Village Voice one of the best jazz albums of 2001. All About Jazz called him "a virtuoso guitarist with impeccable swing". In 2000, he won the Jazziz reader poll for "Best New Talent".

Ben-Hur lives in Teaneck, New Jersey, with his wife, singer Amy London, and their two daughters.

== Discography ==
- Two for the Road with Amy London (Fivecast, 1994)
- Backyard with Barry Harris (TCB, 1995)
- Sofia's Butterfly (TCB, 1997)
- Anna's Dance (Reservoir, 2001)
- Signature (Reservoir, 2005)
- Keepin' It Open (Motéma, 2007)
- Smile with Gene Bertoncini (Motéma, 2008)
- Fortuna (Motéma, 2009)
- Mojave with Nilson Matta (Motéma, 2011)
- Our Thing with Santi Debriano, Duduka Da Fonseca (Motéma, 2012)
- Alegria de Viver with Leny Andrade (Motéma, 2014)
- Introspection with Harvie S. (Jazzheads, 2018)
- Stories (Dot Time, 2021)
- Love Letters (Mighty Quinn, 2023)
