= Niederhoffer =

Niederhoffer is a surname of German origin and may refer to the following people:

- Arthur Niederhoffer (1917–1981), American sociologist and police officer
- Galt Niederhoffer (born 1976), American movie producer and novelist
- Roy Niederhoffer (born 1966), American hedge fund manager and philanthropist
- Victor Niederhoffer (1943– 2026), American hedge fund manager, U.S. Squash Champion and Paddleball Champion, bestselling author, and statistician.
