= Toby Crabel =

American commodities trader

- Born: 1955 (age 70–71); Erie, Pennsylvania
- Education: Florida Technological University (renamed the University of Central Florida); University of California, Berkeley
- Occupations: tennis player, commodities trader, and author
- Known for: competed in the Men's Doubles in the 1980 French Tennis Open; ranked the No.1 player in the 65-and-over age range in the US (2021); hedge fund manager of $5 billion fund
- Notable work: Day Trading With Short Term Price Patterns and Opening Range Breakout (1990)

Toby Crabel (born 1955) is an American tennis player, commodities trader, and author.

In 1991, Crabel moved to New York City to work under hedge fund manager Victor Niederhoffer in research and trading at Niederhoffer Investments. He left Niederhoffer Investments to run systematic asset strategies independently, and launched the Crabel Diversified Futures program, engaging in automated and managed futures trading. The firm's total assets under management ultimately reached over $5 billion.

Crabel is an active tennis player. In 1978, he was ranked as the # 328 player in the world in singles and # 304 in doubles, career highs. He competed in the Men's Doubles in the 1980 French Open. In 2021 he was ranked the No.1 player in the 65-and-over age range in the US.

== Early life and education ==
Crabel was born and grew up in Erie, Pennsylvania.

Crabel attended Florida Technological University (renamed the University of Central Florida), and majored in finance. He played on the tennis team, and was a 3-time NCAA Division II All-American. In 1977 he reached the quarterfinals of the NCAA Division II National Championship singles tournament.

He then attended the University of California, Berkeley, where he studied mathematics.

== Tennis career ==
Since 1973 (age of 18), he has been playing professional tennis. Following college, Crabel played on the professional circuit for three years on the ATP Tour. In 1978, Crabel was ranked as the # 328 singles player in the world, a career high; his career high in doubles was # 304. He competed in Men's Doubles in the 1980 French Open with Ian Harris, and they lost their first-round match against Vitas Gerulaitis and former World No. 1 Fred Stolle in straight sets. He played professional tennis in Europe.

Following his retirement from the ATP Tour, Crabel remained active in senior tennis circuits under the United States Tennis Association (USTA) and the International Tennis Federation (ITF). In October 2021, he captured a USTA Gold Ball by winning the USTA National Men's 65 Clay Court Championships in New Orleans. Later that year, he won the Crabel Capital USTA National Men's 65 Grass Court Championships, hosted by his company. He finished the 2021 season ranked as the No. 1 player in the US in the Men's 65-and-over age division. Crabel was selected by the USTA to represent the US at the 2021 ITF Super-Senior World Team Championships, competing for the Britannia Cup. He achieved a peak ranking of No. 11 in the International Tennis Federation Senior World Rankings. He supports senior tennis through corporate tournament sponsorship and funding specialized prize-money masters events.

== Financial career ==
In 1975, while attending college, Crabel began to trade the markets. In 1980, he worked as a runner on the Chicago Mercantile Exchange. In the late 1980s, Crabel published a series of articles detailing various short-term price patterns for futures trading. Crabel released his book, Day Trading with Short-term Price Patterns, in 1990.

In 1991, Crabel moved to New York City to work under hedge fund manager Victor Niederhoffer in research and trading at Niederhoffer Investments. At the firm, he focused on short-term pattern research and quantitative analysis alongside other traders such as Monroe Trout and Roy Niederhoffer. During this period, he also provided short-term market analysis and advice directly to floor traders through his advisory work and commodity newsletters. He left Niederhoffer Investments in 1992 to run systematic asset strategies independently. He focused on launching the Crabel Diversified Futures program, engaging in automated and managed futures trading.

In 1997, he established Crabel Capital Management as a successor to his trading sole proprietorship. He initially managed the hedge fund's diversified futures programs from his house in River Hills, Wisconsin, adjacent to cornfields, northwest of Milwaukee. Diversified Futures closed to new investments in 2001, had a record of positive returns, having avoided a single losing year between 1991 and 2002, and had positive returns from inception through 2006. He is the fund manager of "Crabel Capital Management," which in 2005 ranked highly on Absolute Return magazine's list of US groups with more than $1 billion assets under management. Crabel managed $3.2 billion with growth of 16.7% in 2005. In 2005, the Financial Times called Crabel "the most well-known trader on the counter-trend side". He lived and worked out of the greater Milwaukee area until relocating his family and corporate headquarters to Southern California, establishing the firm's main offices in Los Angeles. In California, Crabel and his wife, fashion designer Lorena Sarbu, established their family residence in Beverly Hills.

Crabel manages private client assets, using the Crabel Fund Ltd for non-US investors and the Crabel Fund LP for US clients. The firm's total assets under management reached over $5 billion. This asset base is traded systematically across several quantitative programs. Crabel manages these funds with a staff of 31 researchers focused on quantitative research and development, and 28 traders. In an hour-long April 2026 interview, Grabel ruminated on his decades of experience navigating the fact that markets are not stable, and discussed why momentum behaves differently now, how liquidity has changed, and why execution is now a defining edge.

== Bibliography ==
Crabel, Toby (1990). Day Trading With Short Term Price Patterns and Opening Range Breakout. Traders Press. ISBN 0-934380-17-1.

== See also ==
- Monroe Trout
- Victor Niederhoffer
