= Laura Virella =

Mezzo-soprano from Puerto Rico

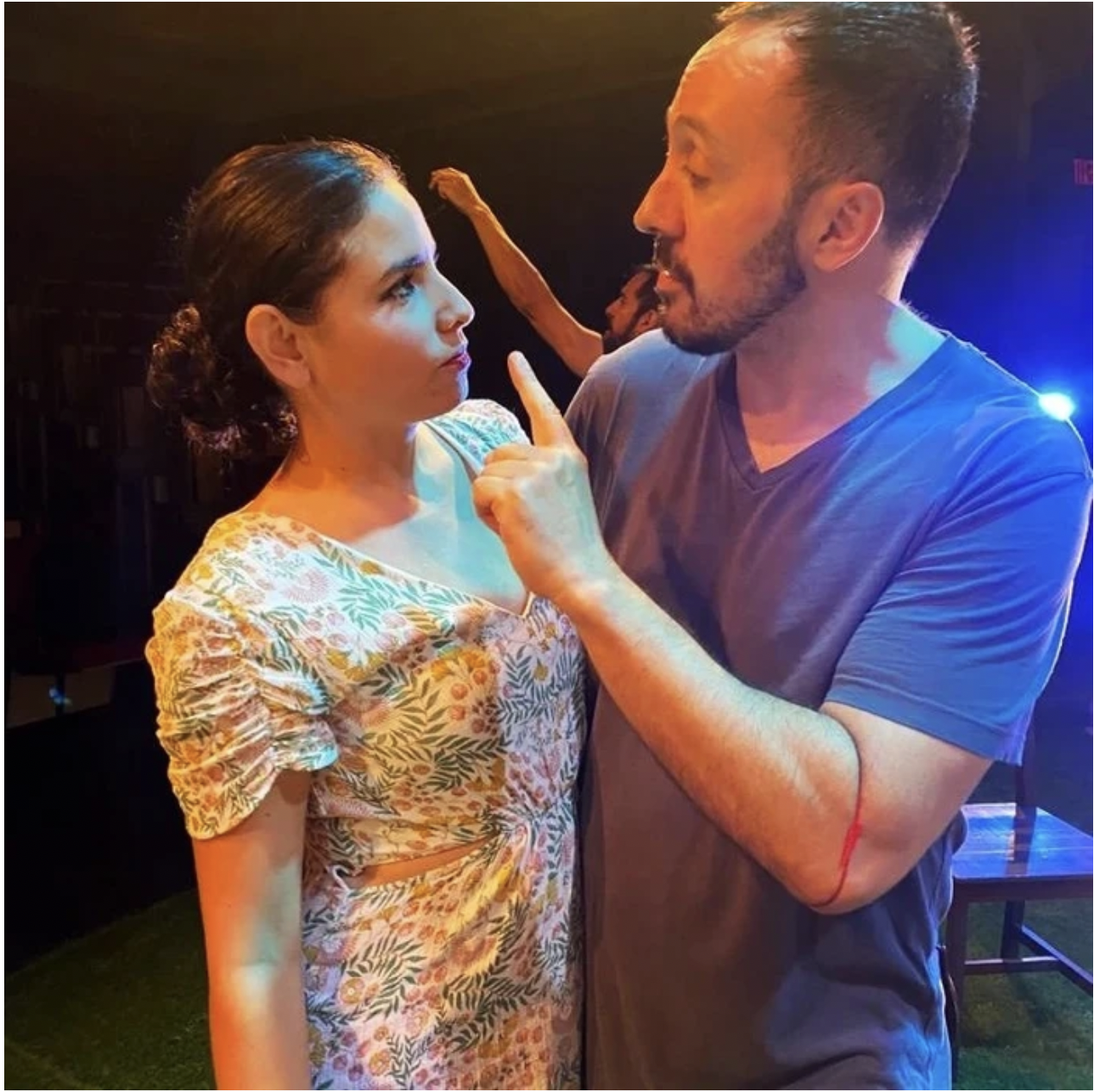
- Virella during a rehearsal for the zarzuela La revoltosa

Background information
- Origin: San Juan, Puerto Rico
- Genres: Classical
- Occupations: Mezzo-soprano, actor, writer
- Years active: 2001–present
- Label: Lexicon Classics
- Website: lauravirella.com

Laura Virella is a mezzo-soprano from Puerto Rico based in New York. She performs as principal artist in opera, operetta, zarzuela, song, symphonic repertoire and chamber music.

== Career ==
Early in her career she was nominated alongside a roster of Washington National Opera principal artists and won second place to international operatic star Patricia Racette in the DC Theatre Scene Audience Choice Awards as Best Actress in Opera for her portrayal of Federico Moreno Torroba's Luisa Fernanda with Teatro de la Luna.

Her debut album, Al menos cantos: Songs of Jack Délano, a collaboration with Russian-Mexican pianist Alla Milchtein and American cellist Kate Dillingham, became the first worldwide commercial recording of works by the Ukrainian-born Puerto Rican composer, and on its release week charted number 2 on Billboard in the Traditional Classical category.

She also wrote and recorded the theme song for the award-winning Puerto Rican short film Dream of Vermilion, by cinematographers Heixan Robles, David Farmer and Robert Alexander García Cooper.

She has been an avid performer of contemporary composers, including Laura Kaminsky, Gabriela Lena Frank, Edmund Cionek, Robert Xavier Rodriguez, David Karp, Seth Boustead and Gilbert Galindo. She covered the title role of Frida in the world premiere of El último sueño de Frida y Diego at San Diego Opera in 2022, a co-production with San Francisco Opera. Professional principal-artist affiliations include San Diego Opera, El Paso Opera, Detroit Opera, Long Beach Opera, the Phoenicia International Festival of the Voice, Mercury Opera, Festival de Santa Florentina (Barcelona), Theater Rudolstadt, Ópera de Puerto Rico, Wolf Trap Opera, Puerto Rico Symphony, Arts Ahimsa, Tribeca New Music Festival, Queens New Music Festival and New York Opera Fest.

== Awards ==
She is a Helen Hayes Award nominee for Outstanding Lead Performer in a Musical and a Helen Hayes Award winner for Outstanding Ensemble in a Musical for her work in the zarzuela La revoltosa with GALA Hispanic Theatre.

== Discography ==
- Al menos cantos: Songs of Jack Délano, with Alla Milchtein, piano, and Kate Dillingham, cello. Lexicon Classics (2022)
- Época de grito: A cappella single written and recorded for the award-winning short film Dream of Vermilion (2011, re-released 2022)
