= Martin Luther King Jr. Educational Campus =

Public school campus in New York City

Coordinates: 40.774692°N 73.985015°W

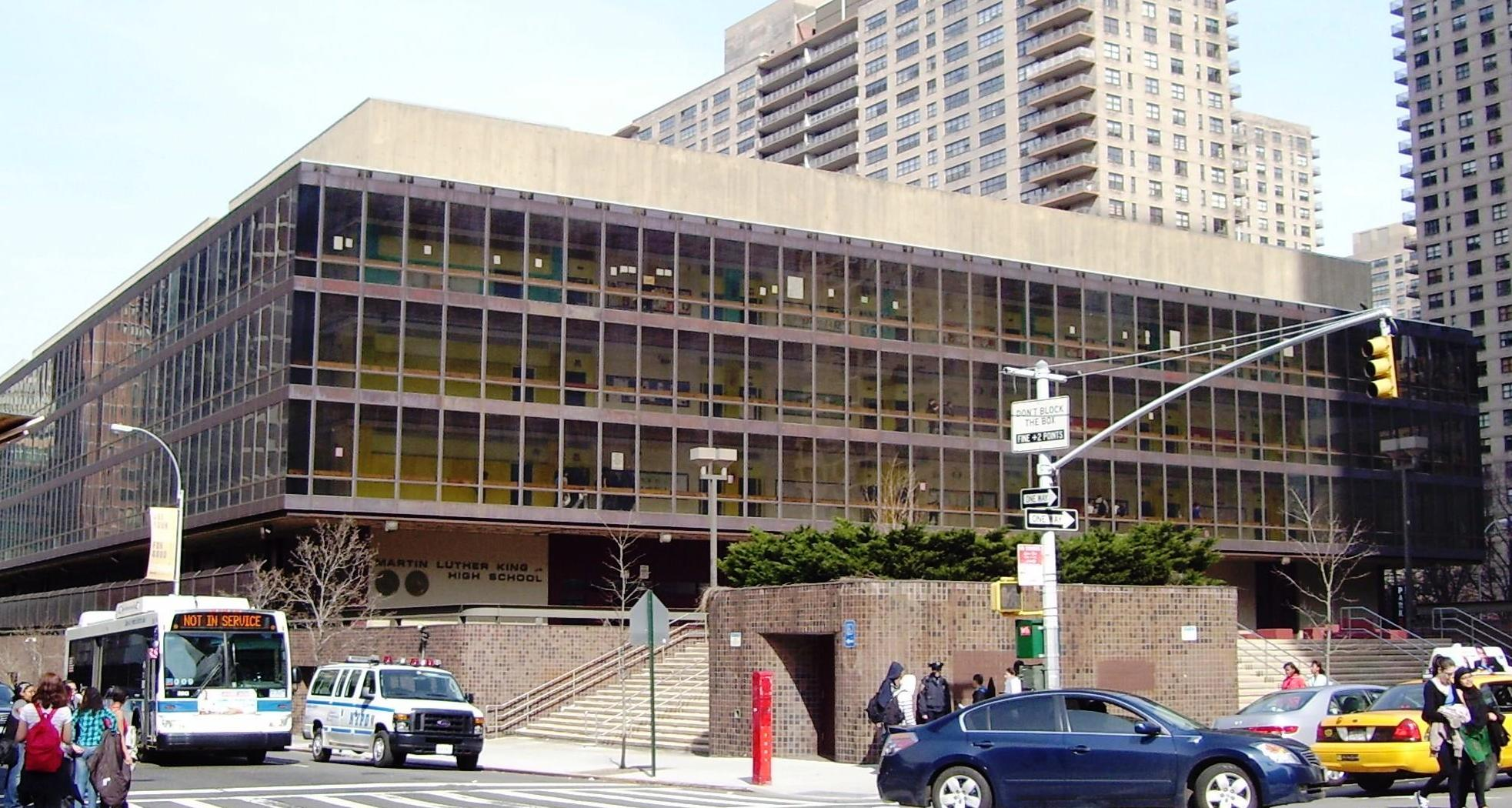
Martin Luther King Jr. Educational Complex

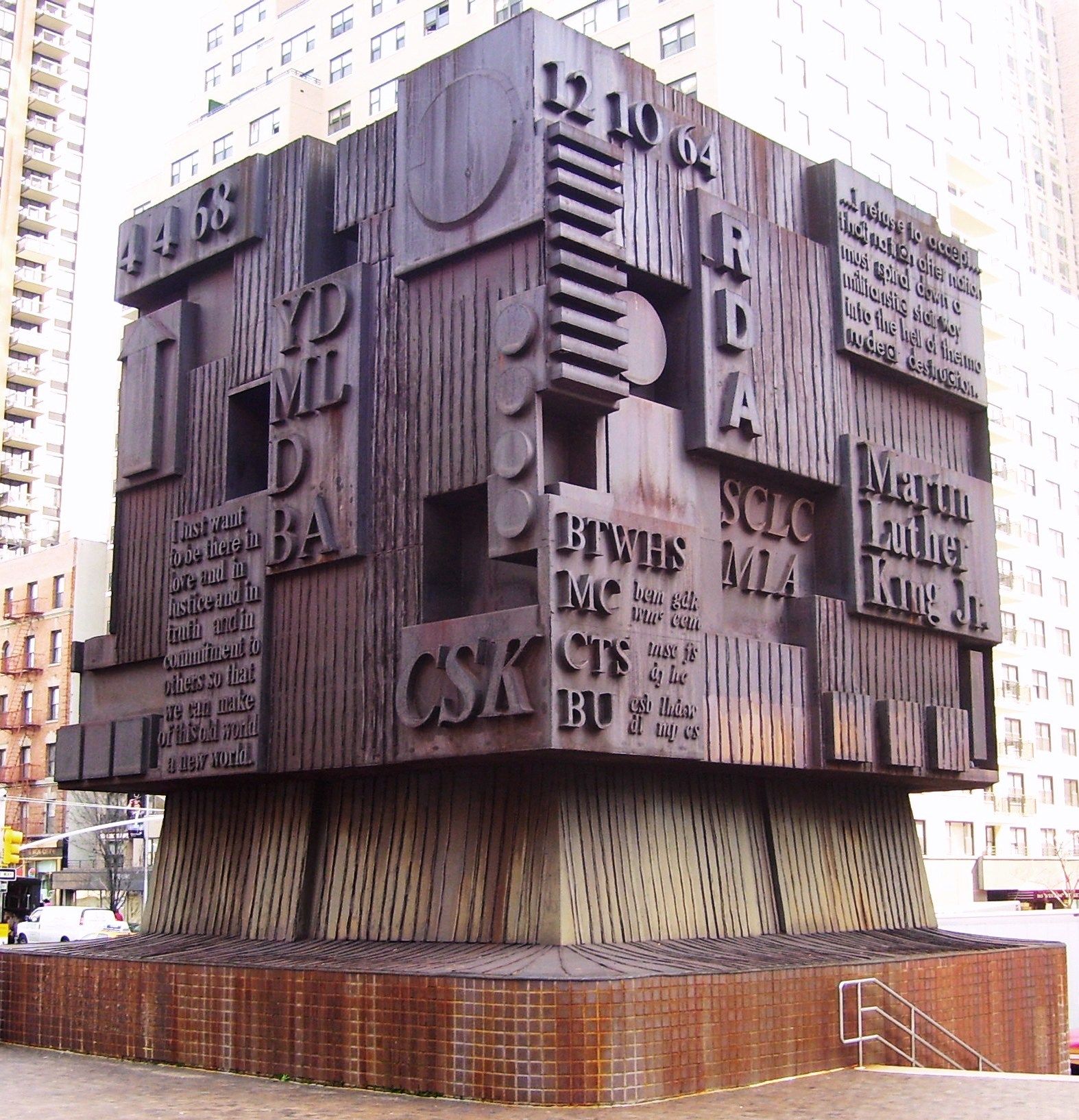
Memorial sculpture by William Tarr

The Martin Luther King Jr. Educational Campus is a five-story public school facility at 122 Amsterdam Avenue between West 65th and 66th Streets in Lincoln Square, Manhattan, New York City, near Lincoln Center. The campus is faced on Amsterdam Avenue by a wide elevated plaza which features a self-weathering steel memorial sculpture by William Tarr. The same steel was used by architect Frost Associates in the curtain wall of the building, the interior of which has an arrangement of perimeter corridors with floor-to-ceiling windows, leaving many classrooms on the inner side windowless. The school is across West 65th Street from Fiorello H. LaGuardia High School of Music & Art and Performing Arts.

== History ==
The building was formerly the location of Martin Luther King Jr. High School, which opened in 1975. According to The New York Times, the school had been troubled throughout its history, gaining a bad reputation for its construction delay, planned curriculum restructurings, low student enrollment, and abysmal academic performance:

Construction of the school took longer than anticipated, so the first students were temporarily housed on a floor of a junior high school in Chelsea that had a bad reputation. By the time the building finally opened... a number of middle-class parents had pulled their children out in disgust. Less than three years after the school opened, the Board of Education attempted to restructure it into a performing arts school with selective admissions. But the plan was scrapped when parents accused the board of trying to drive poor minority students out of the building and insulting the memory of the Rev. Martin Luther King Jr. Tensions mounted again in the early 1980s, when the board proposed merging King, which was underenrolled, and Louis D. Brandeis High School, on West 84th Street, and creating a vocational curriculum. But again, parents revolted and the plan fell through. As the city created smaller, specialized high schools and magnet programs in the 1990s, King often drew students who were not motivated enough to apply to those. It remained an academic disappointment.... Since the late 1980s, the school has had a number of institutes that students must apply to: one in law and social justice, for example, and another in cultural arts. The hope was to attract more eager students, but educators familiar with King say that since it is still one big school, too many students fall through the cracks and too many, scared off by its size and reputation, enroll elsewhere.

It has a history of violence, including the shooting of two tenth grade students inside the school on January 15, 2002, the birthday of Martin Luther King Jr. Other violence had occurred in the school:

In 1997, six students were charged with sexually assaulting a 13-year-old girl in a boys' bathroom. In 1992, a group of young men attacked two students with a pipe and a machete outside the building. And in 1990, a 15-year-old student was shot in the stomach by another student inside the school....[In 2002, there were] 10 reported cases of weapons possession at the school, twice as many as during the same period last year, according to police statistics.

The closing of the school was included by Chancellor Joel Klein and Mayor Michael Bloomberg in the education reform policy. The school was closed on June 27, 2005, by the New York City Department of Education.

2023 marked the 50th anniversary of the memorial sculpture to Dr King, by William Tarr, which has the date 1973 on its base. It is a large cube 30’ by 30’ by 30’ (9 x 9 x 9 meters) made of self-weathering steel and built around the central intake unit for the school's heating, ventilation and air conditioning system.

== Current configuration ==
The high school has been replaced by seven separate high schools which operate on different floors of the building. Each school has separate lunch and dismissal times. The schools, listed by the date of their entry into the campus, are:

- 2002 – High School for Law, Advocacy, and Community Justice: The school is commonly known as MLK Law, due to its cumbersome official name. The High School for Law, Advocacy, and Community Justice graduated its first class in June 2006, consisting of approximately 60 students. In 2008, the school partnered with M.O.V.E. Inc. to implement a mentorship program.
- 2002 – High School of the Arts and Technology: The High School of Arts and Technology uses the third floor of the building. Ms. Geiger was its founding principal, who retired in 2016 and was replaced by Mariela Graham. The current principal is Bridget Garzaniti. The school has now become a part of Urban Assembly, which is a non-profit organization that helps underserved youth become college and career ready.
- 2003 – Manhattan/Hunter College High School for Sciences (not to be confused with the elite Hunter College High School): Students spend their first three years in classes in the MLK complex. Seniors spend their entire fourth year of high school on the Hunter College campus on the Upper East Side, taking a mix of high school and college-level courses. Manhattan Hunter Science is a part of the Early College Initiative. While many New York City high schools offer students the chance to take college courses, what makes Manhattan Hunter different is the level of support the students receive. Their high school English and social studies teachers travel with them to the college and offer regular classes there. While the students take college courses in math and science, the high school English and social studies teachers offer hand-holding and advice for all the subjects. The college courses in math and science tend to be large lecture classes, with as many as 600 students. A collaboration between Hunter College and the New York City Department of Education, Manhattan/Hunter High School for Science offers classes to help students prepare not only for college-level academics, but also for the freedom and responsibility of college life. The new school is designed to address the fact that more than one-third of college students nationally drop out before completing their freshman year.
- 2005 – High School for Arts, Imagination And Inquiry
- 2006 – Urban Assembly School For Media Studies

Urban Assembly School for Media Studies (UASMS) is a part of a network of Urban Assembly public schools. UASMS focuses on art and design, students make posters, projects, drawings and can also take part in plays and theater productions.

- 2006 – Manhattan Theatre Lab High School (founded 2004, moved into complex 2006). This school was shuttered in 2015, in the wake of poor performance and allegations of cheating.
- 2013 – Special Music School High School
