= Tzipora Jochsberger =

Music teacher and founder of HebrArts School for Music and Dance

- ציפורה יוכסברגר
- Born: Tzipora Jochsberger; 27 December 1920; Leutershausen, Bavaria
- Died: 29 October 2017 (aged 96); Jerusalem
- Occupation: Music teacher

Tzipora Jochsberger (YOKS-ber-ger, Hebrew: ציפורה יוכסברגר; 27 December 1920 – 29 October 2017) was a music teacher and founder of the Hebrew Arts School for Music and Dance, now known as the Kaufman Music Center.

== Early life and education ==
Jochsberger was born in Leutershausen, Bavaria, Germany, as Hilda Jochsberger. Her father Nathan was a cattle dealer, and her mother Sofie (née Enslein) a homemaker. Sofie bought Tzipora a piano when she was 5 years old; by 8, she was having private tutoring in Ansbach. As one of the few Jewish families in Leutershausen, and amid growing antisemitic legislation in Nazi Germany, the Jochsbergers faced physical attacks and restrictions on education in Germany. However, she later moved to the Jewish Teachers Seminary in Würzburg, Bavaria, and began to learn Hebrew and sewing.

After Jochsberger had left home, her parents went into hiding following physical attack in their hometown. They sold their house Leutershausen, later moving to Nuremberg. At the seminary, a classmate of Jochsberger's told her that she was going to perform at the Palestine Conservatory of Music in Jerusalem and audition to live and learn music in Palestine. Wishing to follow in her classmate's footsteps, and seeing this as an escape from Nazi persecution, Jochsberger asked her father to take her to Berlin. Before leaving, she performed Songs Without Words by Felix Mendelssohn to the founder of the conservatory.

Jochsberger left Germany in 1939 and consequently settled in Jerusalem with the help of her mother. There, she taught music there and encouraged her family to emigrate. However, her parents stayed in Germany, and in 1944 her parents were killed in the gas chambers of Auschwitz concentration camp.

== Career ==
In 1950, Jochsberger left Israel for New York City, US, and founded the Hebrew Arts School for Music and Dance. Based in the city's Manhattan district, the school was described by The New York Times in 1985 as "an important New York institution where music, art, dance and theater are taught to some 450 children and - in evening and extension classes - to between 600 and 700 adults". Jochsberger founded the school in order to keep the tradition of Jewish folk music and the arts alive to the next generation. She also received qualifications (master's and doctoral degrees) in sacred music at the Jewish Theological Seminary of America.

Jochsberger stayed as was director of the school until she retired 33 years later, whereby she left the United States and returned to Israel. There, she founded the Israel Music Heritage Project and co-produced a number of documentary pieces. She died in Jerusalem on 29 October 2017 at the age of 96.
