= Henry Kaufman =

American financier

Henry Kaufman (born October 20, 1927) is president of Henry Kaufman & Company, Inc., a firm established in April 1988, specializing in economic and financial consulting, and is known by the nickname "Dr. Doom."

== Early life ==
Kaufman was born on October 20, 1927, in Gedern, Germany. He was the son of a kosher butcher in a small village in Germany. In 1937, the then-9-year-old Kaufman fled Wenings, Germany and the Nazis with his family. He attended high school in Washington Heights, where Henry Kissinger and Alan Greenspan preceded him by a year or two. In 1948, he received a B.A. in economics from New York University, followed by an M.S. in finance from Columbia University in 1949, and a Ph.D. in banking and finance from New York University Graduate School of Business Administration in 1958.

== Career ==
Kaufman worked in commercial banking and served as an economist at the Federal Reserve Bank of New York. After the Federal Reserve, he spent 26 years with Salomon Brothers, where he was managing director, member of the executive committee, and in charge of the firm's four research departments. He was also a vice chairman of the parent company, Salomon Inc. He also served as a director of Lehman Brothers Holdings Inc. and as chairman of the Lehman board's finance and risk committee.

=== Nickname ===
In the 1970s, Kaufman earned the sobriquet "Dr. Doom" when he was the chief economist at Salomon Brothers due to his frequent criticisms of government policies. On the morning of August 17, 1982, he accurately predicted the market had bottomed out which led to a huge rally that day in both stocks and bonds that was to be the beginning of the longest growing market in history.

=== Published books ===
In 1987, Kaufman was awarded the first George S. Eccles Prize for excellence in economic writing from the Columbia Business School for his book, Interest Rates, the Markets, and the New Financial World. In June 2000, On Money and Markets, A Wall Street Memoir was published. In August 2009, The Road to Financial Reformation was published. In 2017, Tectonic Shifts in Financial Markets: People, Policies, and Institutions was published.

== Personal life ==
Besides his business activities, Kaufman is active in a number of public organizations in the following capacities: member of the board of trustees (and chairman emeritus), Institute of International Education, member of the board of trustees and member of the investment committee, Norton Museum of Art, member (and chairman emeritus), board of overseers, Stern School of Business, New York University, member of the board of governors, Tel-Aviv University, member of the international advisory committee, Federal Reserve Bank of New York, Fellow, American Academy of Arts & Sciences, former treasurer, The Economic Club of New York, honorary trustee (and former president), The Animal Medical Center, life trustee, New York University, life trustee, The Jewish Museum. New York's Kaufman Music Center was named in recognition of major gifts from Kaufman and his wife Elaine.

=== Honors ===
In 1982, Kaufman received an honorary Doctor of Laws degree from New York University, an honorary Doctor of Humane Letters degree from Yeshiva University in 1986, and from Trinity College in 2005. The Henry Kaufman Professorship of Financial Institutions is named in his honor.

== See also ==
- List of investors in Bernard L. Madoff Securities
