= Lucy Moses School =

Arts school in Manhattan, New York

Coordinates: 40°46′30.59″N 73°58′58.98″W

Kaufman Music Center's Lucy Moses School is a community arts school located on the Upper West Side of Manhattan in New York City. Founded in 1952 as The Hebrew Arts School for Music and Dance, it is now part of Kaufman Music Center, a performing arts complex that houses the Special Music School (P.S. 859) and Merkin Concert Hall. It is the largest community arts school in the city, and offers lessons to 3,000 children and adults annually.

A not-for-profit school specializing in classes and private lessons in music, dance and theater for children and adults at every level of experience, Lucy Moses School is tuition-based and provides scholarships and need-based financial aid. Located in the Goodman House on 129 West 67th St, the school facilities include classrooms, music and dance studios, the Birnbaum Music Library, and the Ann Goodman Recital Hall. Students also hold year end recitals in Merkin Concert Hall. Lucy Moses School is a certified member of the National Guild for Community Arts, and has distinctive programs in Jazz (founded by Roni Ben-Hur), Sight-singing and Dalcroze.
