= Random Access Music =

American composer and performer collective

- Origin: New York City
- Genres: Classical
- Years active: 2007-
- Members: Composers: Guy Barash, Seth Boustead, Nerissa Campbell, Corey Chang, Gilbert Galindo, Masatora Goya, Zhihua Hu, Beata Moon, Allen Schulz, and Frances White. Performers: soprano Risa Renae Harman, baritone Seth Gilman, flutist and ryuteki player Lish Lindsey, clarinetist and hichiriki player Thomas Piercy, violinist Sabina Torosjan, cellist and composer Daniel Hass, guitarist Nadav Lev, pianist/composer Tengku Irfan, and pianist Marina Iwao.

Random Access Music (RAM) is a New York City-based composers' collective.

Its current members are Composers: Guy Barash, Seth Boustead, Nerissa Campbell, Corey Chang, Gilbert Galindo, Masatora Goya, Zhihua Hu, Beata Moon, Allen Schulz, and Frances White.

Performers: soprano Risa Renae Harman, baritone Seth Gilman, flutist and ryuteki player Lish Lindsey, clarinetist and hichiriki player Thomas Piercy, violinist Sabina Torosjan, cellist and composer Daniel Hass, guitarist Nadav Lev, pianist/composer Tengku Irfan, and pianist Marina Iwao.

The group was set up in 2007 by composer Allen Schulz. RAM produces three concert programs of its members' music each season. Two of these concerts are in collaboration with notable new music ensembles or performers, and the member-composers of RAM write five or six new works specifically for the collaborating ensemble or individual artist. The remaining concert presents recent, but previously-performed works or on-going projects by the member-composers. RAM's composers have written new works for diverse groups and artists, including, Anubis Saxophone Quartet, Austin Symphony concert master Jessica Mathaes, Iktus Percussion Ensemble, the Lost Dog New Music Ensemble, cellist Kate Dillingham, the Parthenia Viol Consort, and Thomas Piercy's Gotham Ensemble.

Other activities by RAM include a yearly call for scores and the Queens New Music Festival, a four-day festival with 9 concerts by established ensembles and individual artists.
