= San Juan Children's Choir =

Puerto Rican children's choir

The San Juan Children's Choir (Coro de Niños de San Juan in Spanish) is a children's choir from San Juan, Puerto Rico. The group was founded in 1966 by its director, Evy Lucío Córdova. The choir usually accepts participants from the age of 6 onwards. Auditions are held every year. Singers who are accepted at this institution leave around the age of 17 or 18.

The San Juan Children's Choir has performed in many countries. The choir performed at the second inauguration of Barack Obama.

== See also ==
- Coro de Niños de Ponce
