= Monroe Trout =

American financial speculator (born 1962)

Monroe Trout Jr. (born January 22, 1962) is a retired financial speculator and hedge fund manager, who was profiled in the 1992 book New Market Wizards by Jack D. Schwager. Trout's expertise is in quantitative analysis, with pattern recognition backed by statistical analysis. He subscribes to Ayn Rand's Objectivism.

Trout began his career trading for statistical arbitrage pioneer Victor Niederhoffer at his firm, NCZ Commodities. He then created his own firms. He has traded stocks, stock index futures, commodity futures, and options, both for his own account and as an advisor for others. In 2002, at the age of 40, Trout announced his retirement from active asset management. He renounced his United States citizenship, and lives in Bermuda.

== Early years ==
Monroe Trout Jr. is the son of Monroe E. Trout, the former Chairman Emeritus of American Healthcare Systems. In 1978 in his hometown of New Canaan, Connecticut at the age of 17, Trout got a summer job with a futures trader. Trout typed in newspaper data into his computer and got his start in markets trading.

== High school ==
Trout attended public schools in New Canaan, Connecticut, where he played basketball for New Canaan High School. Standing at 6 feet 9 inches, he served as the co-captain during the 1979–80 season. That year, the team won a regional championship victory in the Connecticut State Tournament. Following his senior season, he was selected to both the First Team All-Fairfield County Interscholastic Conference (FCIAC) and the First Team All-State Class LL.

== College ==
Trout was recruited to play college basketball at Harvard University under head coach Frank McLaughlin. Over his collegiate career, Trout appeared in 87 games, averaging 8.5 points and 5.1 rebounds per game while shooting 58.2% from the field.

He graduated magna cum laude from Harvard College in 1984 with a B.A. in Economics. His senior honors thesis was on stock index futures titled “Price movements in a Stock Index Futures Market”.

== Career ==
=== Early career ===
Following his graduation, Trout went to New York City and was hired as a full-time trader by statistical arbitrage pioneer Victor Niederhoffer at his firm, NCZ Commodities. From September 1984 until June 1986, Trout traded various futures and options contracts for both the house accounts and his personal account at NCZ.

During this period, he acquired off-the-floor and on-the-floor trading experience as a member of several exchanges. These included the New York Futures Exchange, the American Stock Exchange, and the Commodity Exchange, Inc. (COMEX).

=== Later career ===
In July 1986, Trout left NCZ Commodities to establish his own independent investment firm, the Trout Trading Company.

In 1990, Monroe Trout established a Bermuda-based entity to collect incentive fees for his futures fund and subsequently relocated his family and fund operations from Chicago to Bermuda. The physical move was driven by a combination of regulatory limits preventing domestic funds from trading certain foreign derivatives and a desire to legally insulate the firm’s performance from certain corporate structures. In 1993, he helped fund Rand Financial Services, named after Ayn Rand. He keeps a low profile.

In early 2002, at the age of 40, Trout announced his retirement from active asset management. He transferred majority ownership and operational control of the $3 billion Trout Trading Management Company to his chief executive officer, Matthew Tewksbury. He retired with a net worth reportedly in excess of US$900 million.

He is featured in the 1999 book The New Market Wizards by Jack Schwager.

== Post-retirement and current status ==
Following his departure from the financial industry in 2002, Trout transitioned entirely away from public life and the asset management sector. Having previously renounced his United States citizenship to protect the privacy of his offshore business structures, he has remained outside the purview of domestic regulatory disclosures. Over the subsequent two decades, he maintained a complete media blackout and has not participated in public financial ventures. He continues to reside in Bermuda.

== See also ==
- Toby Crabel
- James Altucher
