= Amy London =

- Born: Cincinnati, Ohio, U.S.
- Genres: Vocal jazz
- Occupation: Singer
- Years active: 1980–present
- Labels: Motéma
- Website: amylondonsings.com

Amy London is a jazz singer and educator who has appeared on Broadway and in the vocal group The Royal Bopsters. London grew up in Cincinnati, Ohio. She moved to Manhattan in 1980 and began teaching jazz vocals in 1984.

When I Look in Your Eyes (Motéma Music, 2007) was her first album as leader, recorded at Bennett Studios in Englewood, New Jersey. The album includes bassist Rufus Reid, drummer Leroy Williams, along with pianists Lee Musiker and the late John Hicks. "Let's Fly", London's second Motema release, 2010, features the title song written by Annie Ross and Amy London, performed with pianist Tardo Hammer, bassist Santi Debriano and drummer Steve Williams. "Bridges", Amy London's retrospective, was released in 2017, and features Fred Hersch, Bob Mintzer, Lonnie Smith, and Darmon Meader. London can also be heard singing alto with the New York Voices on Robert Lepley's "Visions Within," narrated by Meryl Streep.

London sang in the musical City of Angels from 1989 to 1992. She helped start the vocal jazz BFA program at The New School in 1992, at Jazz House Kids in 2013, and is an adjunct professor at New School, Hofstra University, City College and Jazz House Kids. She has led vocal clinics at jazz camps around the world.

In 2015 London produced The Royal Bopsters Project (Motéma), an album that gathered a group of musicians to pay homage to vocalese singers. It received four and a half stars from DownBeat magazine. The group included Amy London, Holli Ross, Dylan Pramuk, and Darmon Meader (replaced by Pete McGuinness). Appearing as guests on the album were jazz singers Mark Murphy, Annie Ross, Jon Hendricks, Sheila Jordan, and Bob Dorough.

In 2019, The Royal Bopsters performed with Sheila Jordan at Ronnie Scott's in London, The Half Note in Athens, and at the 2019 Newport Jazz Festival.

In 2020, The Royal Bopsters' second recording, Party of Four, was released, again on the Motema label. The special guests on this recording are Sheila Jordan and Bob Dorough, as well as Christian McBride. It has garnered rave reviews and enjoyed worldwide airplay, including daily spins on WBGO 88.3 FM from its release on November 8, 2020, until the present. Party of Four received 4 stars from DownBeat, and The Royal Bopsters were voted Best Vocal Jazz Group in the 2020 JazzTimes Critics' Poll.

== Discography ==
- City of Angels (Columbia, 1989)
- Two for the Road (Fivecat, 1994)
- Visions Within with NY Voices (Lepley, 1998)
- When I Look in Your Eyes (Motéma, 2007)
- Let's Fly (Motéma, 2011)
- The Royal Bopsters Project (Motéma, 2015)
- Bridges (Fivecat, 2014)
- Party of Four (Motema, 2020)
