= Kaufman Music Center =

Performing arts complex in New York, US

Coordinates: 40°46′30.59″N 73°58′58.98″W

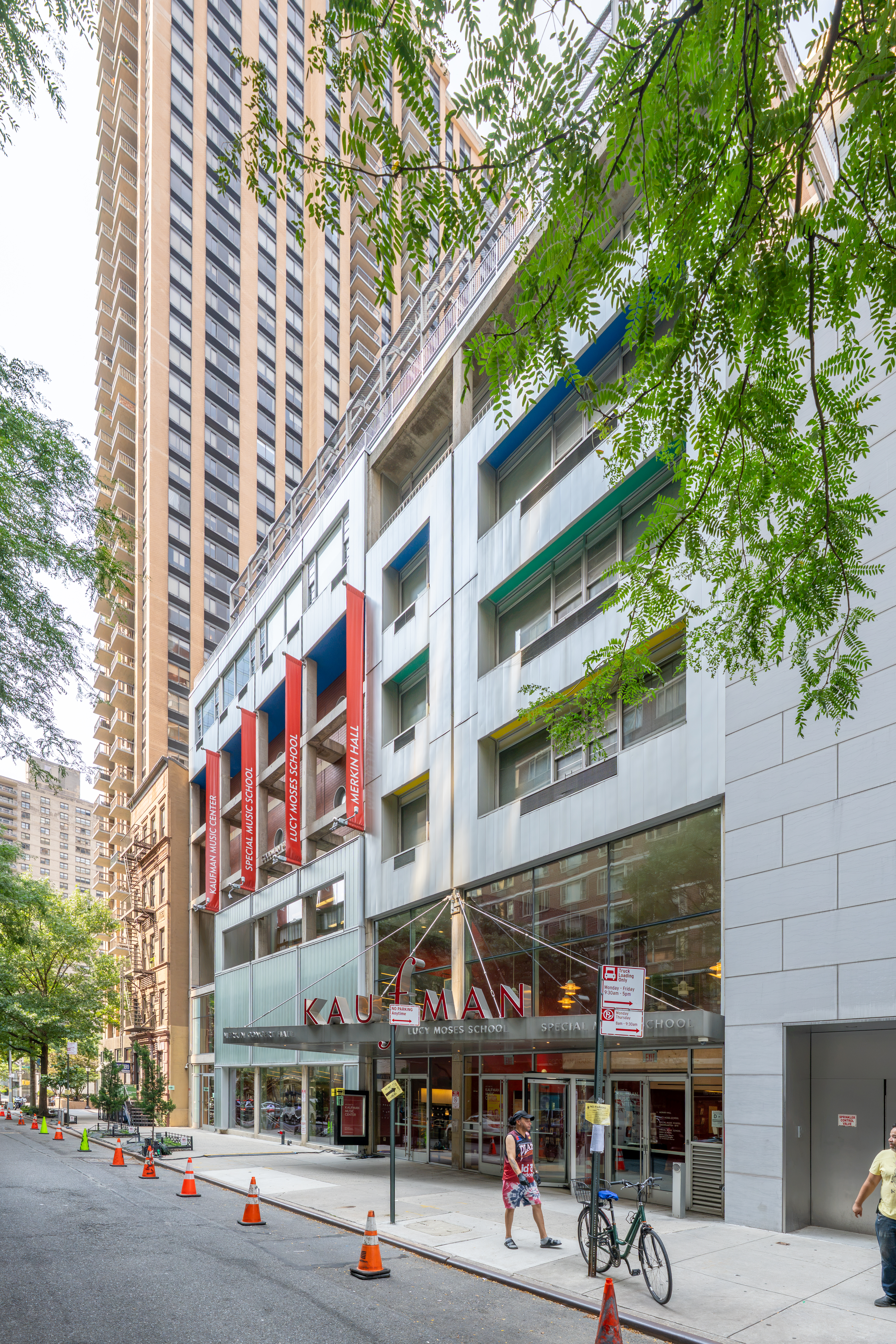
Kaufman Music Center

Kaufman Music Center is a performing arts complex in New York City that houses Lucy Moses School, Special Music School, and Merkin Hall and the "Face the Music" program. Originally known as the Hebrew Arts School, it was founded in 1952 and is currently located on West 67th Street between Broadway and Amsterdam Avenue. More than 75,000 people use the Center annually.

== History ==
Kaufman Music Center was founded by Dr. Tzipora Jochsberger in 1952 as a community music school. Located at 129 W. 67th St. on Manhattan's Upper West Side, today's Kaufman Music Center is home to Merkin Hall; Lucy Moses School, New York's largest community arts school; Special Music School (PS 859), a K-12 public school that teaches music as a core subject; and the teen new music program Face the Music.

First known as the Hebrew Arts School for Music and Dance, the school moved to its permanent home, the Goodman House, on W. 67th St. in 1978. Named after Abraham Goodman, the building was designed by Ashok Bhavnani in the Brutalist style and received the Albert S. Bard Trust Award for excellence in architecture. Merkin Hall opened its doors in 1978, and in 1991 the organization was renamed the Elaine Kaufman Cultural Center in recognition of a major gift by Elaine and Henry Kaufman. At that time the Hebrew Arts School was renamed Lucy Moses School. In 1996, Kaufman Music Center partnered with the New York City Department of Education to open Special Music School/PS 859, a K-8 public school for musically gifted children that expanded into grades 9-12 in 2013. Major renovations by architect Robert A.M. Stern Architects (RAMSA) in 2007 significantly improved Merkin Hall and the exterior of the building.

During the early 1980s, the HAS benefited from a large influx of Jewish émigrés leaving the Soviet Union and arriving in New York City. Many music instructors were not allowed to take their credentials with them when they left, and having a difficult time finding equivalent positions in the United States, found a home at the Hebrew Arts School. Their former students came to the HAS to study, and the school made scholarships available for these students.

Dr. Jochsberger retired in 1986 and was succeeded by Lydia Kontos until 2018, when Kate Sheeran took over as the Executive Director of Kaufman Music Center.

Hedge fund manager and philanthropist Roy Niederhoffer has served on the board of trustees of the Kaufman Center.

From January to April 2021 during the COVID-19 pandemic, Kaufman Music Center hosted the Musical Storefronts series, which presented 107 socially distanced performances inside empty storefronts on the Upper West Side, providing employment for artists impacted by the lockdowns.

== Architecture and renovation ==
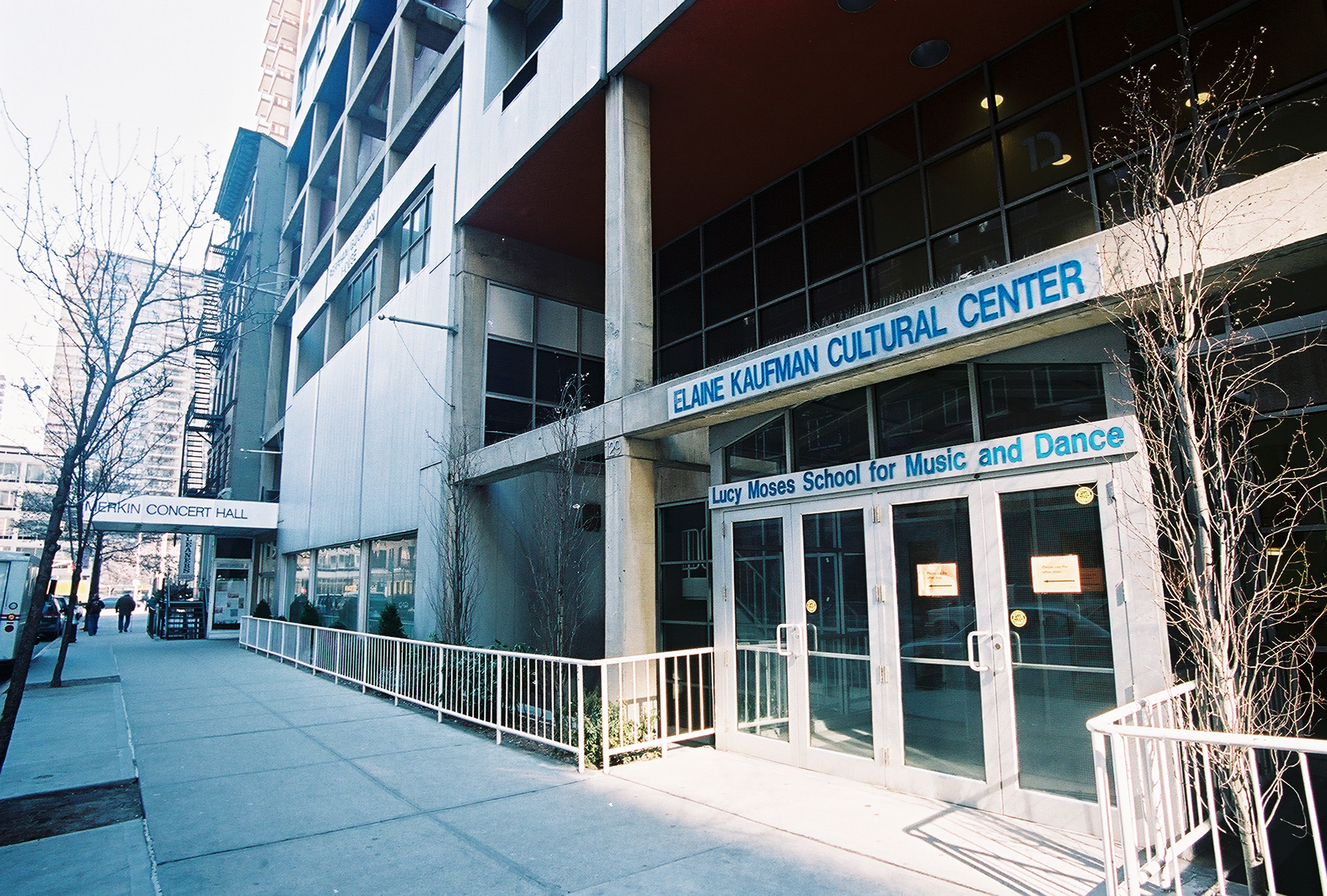
Original exterior to Kaufman Music Center

Designed by Ashok Bhavnani and completed in 1978, the Goodman House was created in a Brutalist raw-concrete style, which was lauded at the time of construction, but over time it was felt that the aesthetic of the building no longer matched the attitude of the schools and concert hall inside. In 2007 the Kaufman Music Center launched a $17 million campaign to renovate the complex. The lead donors were Elaine and Henry Kaufman, who pledged $7 million towards the project. Elaine Kaufman has been a member of the Center’s board for more than twenty years, and served as its chairman from 1999 to 2005. She said, “The Center is a unique organization, placing equal emphasis on education and performance, an essential balance for developing the artists and audiences of the future.”

Robert A.M. Stern Architects oversaw the 2007 renovation of the lobby and balcony levels, as well as a drastic overhaul to the exterior. "The Kaufman Center is kind of rough and tough, because of the Brutalist aesthetic of the building. It's a powerful building, with good, strong bones." Most noticeably, a new marquee unifies the entrances to both Merkin Hall and the two schools. "It visibly unites under one marquee all three parts of the Kaufman Center physically and psychologically," Kontos said.
