= Tomás Blanco (writer) =

Puerto Rican writer (1896–1975)

- Born: December 9, 1896; San Juan, Captaincy General of Puerto Rico
- Died: April 12, 1975 (aged 78); San Juan, Puerto Rico
- Occupations: Author and historian
- Writing career
- Notable works: Histórico de Puerto Rico and El Prejuicio Racial en Puerto Rico

Tomás Blanco (December 9, 1896 – April 12, 1975) was a Puerto Rican writer, poet, narrator, historian, author and physician. Blanco was a writer during the 1930s who was known for his critical essays that analyzed the Puerto Rican culture. Similar to other authors of his generation that lived through the Great Depression, his work focused on political and social issues. He also wrote novels, short stories and poetry.

== Early years ==
Blanco (birth name: Tomás Blanco Geigel) was born and raised in San Juan, Puerto Rico, where he received his primary and secondary education in Catholic schools. After graduating from high school, he went to the United States and enrolled in the Georgetown University in Washington, D.C., to study medicine. Tomás Blanco first pursued the path of pharmaceutical work but progressively began to focus his attention on literature. Blanco traveled throughout Europe and in Spain where he developed his love for writing. Blanco wrote about literature, plus he was also a music critic.

== Written works ==
Blanco returned to Puerto Rico where he dedicated himself to write about Puerto Rican topics. His works are considered very important in the analysis of the "state" of the Puerto Rican culture in both the 19th century and 20th century. Among Blanco's most recognized works are Prontuario Histórico de Puerto Rico and El Prejuicio Racial en Puerto Rico (Racial Prejudice in Puerto Rico). He also wrote many novels and stories such as Los Aguinaldos del Infante (Christmas Stories for Children) and Cuentos Sin Ton Ni Son. He was also the songwriter of the lyrics Tres estrofas de amor: Canción para soprano composed in 1925 by Pablo Casals. Tomás Blanco died on April 12, 1975, in the city of San Juan.

=== Essays ===
In 1935, he published his first literary piece Prontuario Histórico de Puerto Rico which showcases the cultural aspects of the Puerto Rican people and racial dynamics within the country. In the essay he recounts significant events of the history of Puerto Rico, in hope of finding the country's national idiosyncrasy and cultural identity.

The mixing of races and religions created a unique combination of ideas and culture, which sometimes sparked conflict. Tomas Blanco's thoughts on these racial relationships and controversies are presented in, The Racial Prejudice in Puerto Rico. The essay discusses the influence of the slave trade and the discrimination of people of African descent in Puerto Rico. Tomas Blanco speaks of the connection between Spanish Conquistadors influence, Catholicism, and the interconnection of different races. Tomas Blanco argues that the African influences in Puerto Rico are beneficial to the uniqueness and richness of the country.

Other essays include Sobre Palés Matos (1950), which analyzes Palés Matos' poetry influenced by African and Antillean culture and Miserere: en la muerte de Georges Rouault y luz perpetua luzca en él (1959), a review on various paintings by Rouault. He also wrote essays for many newspapers and magazines, such as the Ateneo Puertorriqueño, Isla Asomante, Presente, Revista de la Asociación de Mujeres Graduadas and Revista del Instituto de Cultura Puertorriqueña. He wrote the essay Elogio de la plena en the magazine, Ateneo Puertorriqueño, which discussed the diversity of Puerto Rico and how it positively impacts the island.

=== Poetry ===
Blanco's interest in race relations led him to study African-American poetry. Racial mixing was considered immoral and was looked down upon in the 19th and early 20th century in Puerto Rico. Tomas Blanco challenges these ideas by bringing up these topics in his literary work in a positive manner. In the book "Literatura PuertorriquenÌa Del Siglo Veinte Antologia," the poem La Unicornia de la Isla highlights these controversial ideas and different viewpoints. The poem investigates the cultural identity of the people of Puerto Rico through the mention of topics like miscegenation and incorporating traditional Antillean myths. Much of Tomas Blanco's work highlights the various cultures and belief systems of Puerto Rico and explains how it both positively and negatively affects the environment of the country. In Los cinco sentidos: inventario de cosas nuestras (1955), he presents Antillean myths in poetic form. Much of Tomas Blanco's work highlights the various cultures and belief systems of Puerto Rico and explains how it both positively and negatively affects the environment of the country. He also wrote the poem Letras para música in 1964.

=== Short stories ===
Blanco wrote a number of short stories, such as Los aguinaldos del Infante: glosa de Epifanía (1954) about Christmas, La dragoneta: cuento de Semana Santa (1956) and Cuentos sin ton ni son (1970).

== See also ==
- List of Latin American writers
- List of Puerto Rican writers
- List of Puerto Ricans
- Puerto Rican literature
- Multi-Ethnic Literature of the United States
- For the Spanish film actor: Tomás Blanco
