= Kate Dillingham =

- Origin: New York City, US
- Genre: Classical
- Occupations: Cellist; Music educator
- Instrument: Cello
- Years active: 1993-present
- Label: Affetto Recordings | New Focus Recordings | Furious Artisans | DLGM Productions | Connoisseur Society
- Member of: Random Access Music
- Website: http://www.katedillingham.com/

Kate Dillingham is an American classical cellist from New York City. She performs as a soloist and as a chamber musician, and is Artistic Director of the ArtsAhimsa Chamber Music Festival. A voting member of the Recording Academy (GRAMMY’s) and President of the Violoncello Society of New York (VCS), Dillingham made her debut with orchestra in Russia in 1998 with the Moscow Chamber Orchestra "The Seasons" and in Saint Petersburg with the St. Petersburg Philharmonic "Hermitage." In 2002, she made her New York debut recital at Merkin Concert Hall premiering a commissioned work by Augusta Read Thomas ("Chant") and premiered a solo work by Jennifer Higdon. Her recordings were licensed for use in the films La rafle and Les Berlinoises. A former student of Bernard Greenhouse, she is the Artistic Director of the Wellfleet CelloFest, held in honor of the centenary of his birth. Dillingham also studied with Maria Tchaikovskaya at the Moscow Conservatory. A teacher and inventor, she founded MyBlueSkiesMusic.com (Pat. Pend. 2022) - an online teaching platform for musicians.

Kate is the great, great, granddaughter of John Marshall Harlan and the granddaughter of John Marshall Harlan II.

== Discography ==
- Dvorak Cello Concerto in B minor Op.104. and Other Works with Brno Philharmonic and Anthony Armore (2019)
- Three Sonatas for Viola da Gamba and Harpsichord, BWV 1027-1029 J.S. Bach with Jory Vinikour, harpsichord (2016)
- Crossings: New Music for Cello - Premieres and Commissions (2015)
- Lutoslawski, Herbert, Dvorak, Higdon with the Moscow Symphony Orchestra (2004)
- Debussy, Honegger and Faure with Blair McMillen, piano (2002)
- Haydn Cello Concertos with the Moscow Chamber Orchestra "The Seasons" (2001)

== Publications ==
Three Sonatas for Violoncello and Keyboard, BWV 1027-1029 by J.S. Bach edited by Bernard Greenhouse and Kate Dillingham, published by G. Schirmer Inc.
