= Special Music School =

Public school in New York City

Coordinates: 40°46′30.59″N 73°58′58.98″W

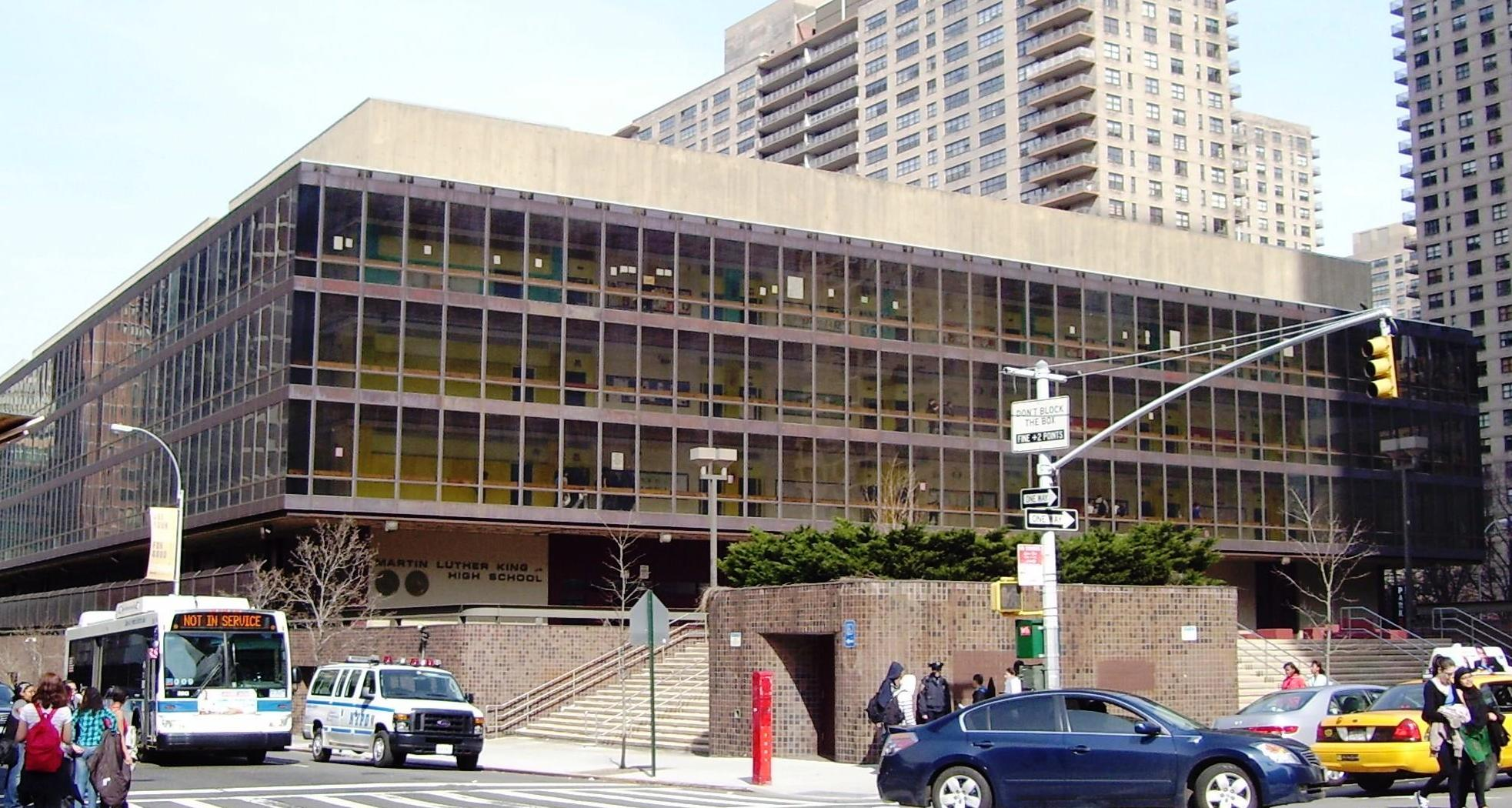
- The exterior of the Martin Luther King Jr. Educational Campus, which houses Special Music School's High School.

Location
- 129 West 67th Street; New York City, New York; United States

Information
- Type: Public and Private Collaboration
- Established: 1996
- Category: Performing Arts
- Principal: Katherine Banucci-Smith
- Grades: K-12
- Gender: Co-ed
- Campus: Urban
- Tuition: None
- Website: kaufmanmusiccenter.org/sms/

Special Music School (SMS, PS 859) is a K-12 public school that teaches music as a core subject on the Upper West Side of Manhattan, New York City. The school is run as a public/private partnership between the New York City Department of Education and Kaufman Music Center, a not-for-profit, multi-arts organization. The Department of Education funds the academic portion of the students' education, while the music program is funded by private donations through Kaufman Music Center.

== Operations ==
Intended for children with high musical potential, Special Music School provides a rich musical and demanding academic education for grades K-12 through an integrated curriculum with a primary focus on music. In the lower and middle schools children have two private lessons per week in piano, cello, violin, flute, French horn, trumpet, trombone, percussion, oboe, or clarinet, as well as classes in music theory, chorus, and P.E. . Three quarters of the students' time is spent on academic subjects. The school has partnerships with the National Dance Institute, the Center for Educational Innovation, New Visions for Public Schools, Studio in a School, Teachers College, Columbia University and the Metropolitan Museum of Art.

Special Music School also has a high school at the Martin Luther King Jr. Educational Campus on the Upper West Side, with a music curriculum that emphasizes the development of the student as a musician for the 21st century. With the establishment of the high school extension, Special Music School High School is the city's only K-12 school that teaches music as a core subject. The music program covers the subjects of music theory, music history, and music technology. SMS had their first high school graduating class in 2017 with 100% graduation and college success rate.

Students from all five boroughs of New York City are eligible to apply for admission, across all grades in lower and upper schools, which is by audition. Admission is extremely competitive, and the lower school kindergarten class gets approximately 700 applicants for 15 spaces. The total enrollment for all grades (K-12) is approximately 315 students. SMS consistently ranks among the top NYC public schools, based on student academic performance on New York State assessments.

== History ==
The school was founded in 1996 and originally called The Special Music School of America. Inspired by the "spets-shkola," special music school system of the former Soviet Union, many original members of the music faculty are Russian-conservatory trained musicians.

In the fall of 2006 Special Music School established the after-school Young Artist Program for grades 9–12. It offers music students intensive after-school study courses. Each week students have classes covering literature and composition, music theory, and ear-training. Students also perform in chamber music and solo recitals.

In 2005, former Special Music School Director Jenny Undercofler founded Face the Music, initially an 8-member after school music ensemble, and now NYC's only "alt classical" teen ensemble composed of 75 students from music students in the tri-state area aged 10 to 18. In 2011 ASCAP awarded its Aaron Copland Award to both Face the Music and Jenny Undercofler.

== Sports ==
There are no sports teams for K-8 students, who are encouraged to join sports teams outside of school. However, students are encouraged and expected to devote most of their extracurricular time to practicing their instrument, joining high-level music ensembles in the city and/or making use of Kaufman Music Center's Lucy Moses School classes as well as concerts at Merkin Concert Hall.

However, in high school, Special Music School offers students the opportunity to participate in many different sports. The schools in the Martin Luther King Jr. Educational Campus are all represented in one team within the Public School Athletic League (PSAL).
