= Merkin Hall =

Concert hall in Manhattan, New York City

- Interactive map of Merkin Hall
- Address: 129 West 67th Street
- Location: New York City, New York, United States
- Coordinates: 40°46′30.59″N 73°58′58.98″W
- Owner: Kaufman Music Center
- Capacity: 449 seats
- Type: Concert hall
- Public transit: 66th Street – Lincoln Center

Construction
- Opened: 1978

Website
- www.kaufmanmusiccenter.org/mch/about/

Merkin Hall is a 449-seat concert hall in Manhattan, New York City. The hall, named in honor of Hermann and Ursula Merkin, is part of the Kaufman Music Center, a complex that includes the Lucy Moses School, a community arts school, and the Special Music School (P.S. 859), a New York City public school for musically gifted children. Merkin Hall hosts 70,000 concertgoers a year.

== Overview ==
Merkin Hall opened in Kaufman Music Center's (then The Hebrew Art School's) Abraham Goodman House in 1978, and soon after distinguished itself as an important New York City venue, featuring innovative classical and new music programming (it is the recipient of three awards in Adventurous Programming by ASCAP/Chamber Music America). Located in the Lincoln Square neighborhood, it is near the Lincoln Center campus but is not affiliated with it. Merkin Hall hosts over 200 concerts a year, many of them Kaufman Music Center presentations. It has several long-running series, presenting established and emerging artists, as well as Broadway and Family focused shows. Beginning in 1986, Kaufman Music Center has co-presented New Sounds Live with WNYC, hosted by John Schaefer and broadcast live on the radio. In 2003, New York Festival of Song began its series of co-presentations at Merkin Hall as well. WQXR-FM's online webcast Q2 began live streaming of Kaufman Music Center's Ecstatic Music Festival in 2011.

== Renovations ==
Kaufman Music Center launched a $17 million campaign to renovate the complex. The lead donors were Elaine and Henry Kaufman, who pledged $7 million towards the project. Elaine Kaufman has been a member of the center's board for more than twenty years, and served as its chairman from 1999 to 2005. She said, “The Center is a unique organization, placing equal emphasis on education and performance, an essential balance for developing the artists and audiences of the future.”

Renovations included restoration of the building façade using contemporary materials and redesign of the main entrance; expanded space for music classes, special events, and theater workshops, including two new classrooms and a flexible balcony educational space; enhanced audio-visual capabilities in Merkin Hall, including updated listening systems for hearing-impaired concert goers and students; structural and mechanical improvements, including the installation of a new HVAC system; reupholstered seating and minor refinishing in Merkin Hall; renovation and expansion of restrooms; expansion of lobby space to serve the two schools; and the redesign of Merkin Hall lobby. The renovation respects the building's original form while enhancing its functionality and appearance.

The renovation aimed to increase the Kaufman Center's public visibility and modernize its patron facilities. Key changes included installing a new exterior canopy bearing the institution's name, positioned to be visible from both Broadway and Amsterdam Avenue. The interior redesign incorporated red marble detailing throughout the lobby, coat check, concessions, and seating entryways to update the venue's aesthetic and enhance the visitor experience for Merkin Hall.
