= My Favorite Things =

My Favorite Things may refer to:

- "My Favorite Things" (song), from the 1959 musical The Sound of Music
- My Favorite Things (John Coltrane album), 1961
- My Favorite Things (Dave Brubeck album), 1965
- My Favorite Things (Shiori Takei album), 2004
- My Favorite Things (Joey Alexander album), 2015
- My Favorite Things: Coltrane at Newport, a 2007 album
- "My Favorite Things" (Barney & Friends), a television episode

== See also ==
- "Favourite Things", a 2003 single by Big Brovaz
