= Ryan Cohan =

American jazz musician

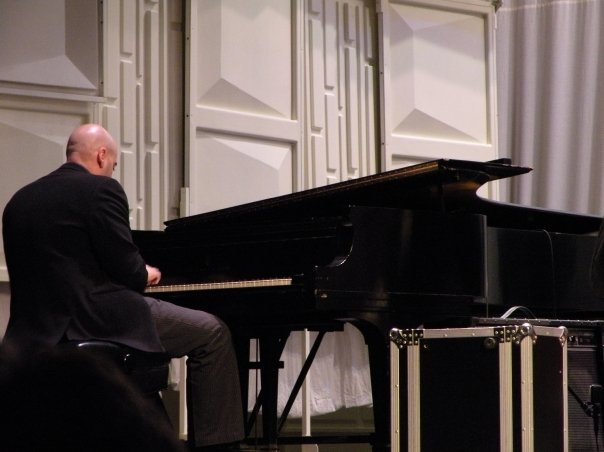
- Ryan Cohan performs in Lafayette, Indiana in 2009.

Background information
- Born: June 6, 1971 (age 55)
- Origin: Chicago, Illinois
- Genres: Jazz
- Occupations: Musician, composer, arranger
- Instrument: Piano
- Years active: 1992–present
- Label: Motéma
- Website: ryancohan.com

Ryan Cohan (born 6 June 1971) is a jazz pianist and composer. His style is a blend of world rhythms, traditional jazz, and classical.

== Biography ==
=== Early life and career ===
Cohan's mother, who was a music teacher and classical pianist, introduced him to music from a young age. He could read sheet music by age five and started learning violin at nine. He later switched to piano and, by his sophomore year of high school, knew he wanted his future to be in music.

His pursuit of music took him to DePaul University, where he received a Bachelor of Music in jazz performance, and later to Skidmore College.

In the late 1990s, Cohan wrote and arranged songs for Ramsey Lewis's albums Dance of the Soul and Appassionata, a 2000 album that was named "jazz album of the year" by Billboard Magazine. Additionally, Cohan has worked with Freddie Hubbard, Milt Hinton, Jon Faddis, Joe Locke, Andy Narell, Curtis Fuller, Pat La Barbera, Regina Carter, Nick Brignola, Andy Bey, Kurt Elling, and Michal Urbaniak among others.

=== As bandleader ===
Ryan Cohan Sextet
- Also known as: Ryan Cohan Quartet
- Genres: Jazz
- Years active: 1997–present
- Labels: Motéma Music, Sirocco Jazz
- Members: Ryan Cohan; James Cammack; Geof Bradfield; Bob Sheppard; Tito Carrillo; Lorin Cohen; Kobie Watkins
- Website: ryancohan.com

In 1996, Ryan recorded his first solo album, Real World, with jazz artists from Chicago and members of the Chicago Symphony Orchestra.

Cohan's second album, Here and Now, was released in 2001 on Sirocco Music. For this album, Cohan formed the Ryan Cohan Sextet, which featured Bob Sheppard and Geof Bradfield on woodwinds, James Cammack and Lorin Cohen on bass, Tito Carrillo on trumpet, and Dana Hall on drums.

In 2007, One Sky was released on Motéma. The album is split into two sections; the first half of the album consists of original compositions and a piano solo of "Lush Life" while the second half consists of a four-part suite titled One Sky: Tone Poems for Humanity. J. Hunter of Albanyjazz.com listed One Sky in his top 5 albums of 2008, saying, "Cohan’s ability to make a sextet sound like a big band gives his message a rich, multi-hued platform, and that message shines ever so brightly."

== Tours ==
With the Ryan Cohan Quartet, Cohan has toured the United States, Canada, Zimbabwe, Rwanda, Jordan, Democratic Republic of the Congo, and Uganda. In 2009, the Quartet toured Eastern Europe as Jazz Ambassadors with the Rhythm Road: American Music Abroad Program sponsored by Jazz at Lincoln Center and the Bureau of Educational and Cultural Affairs at the US State Department.
