= Leonard Herzenberg =

American geneticist (1931–2015)

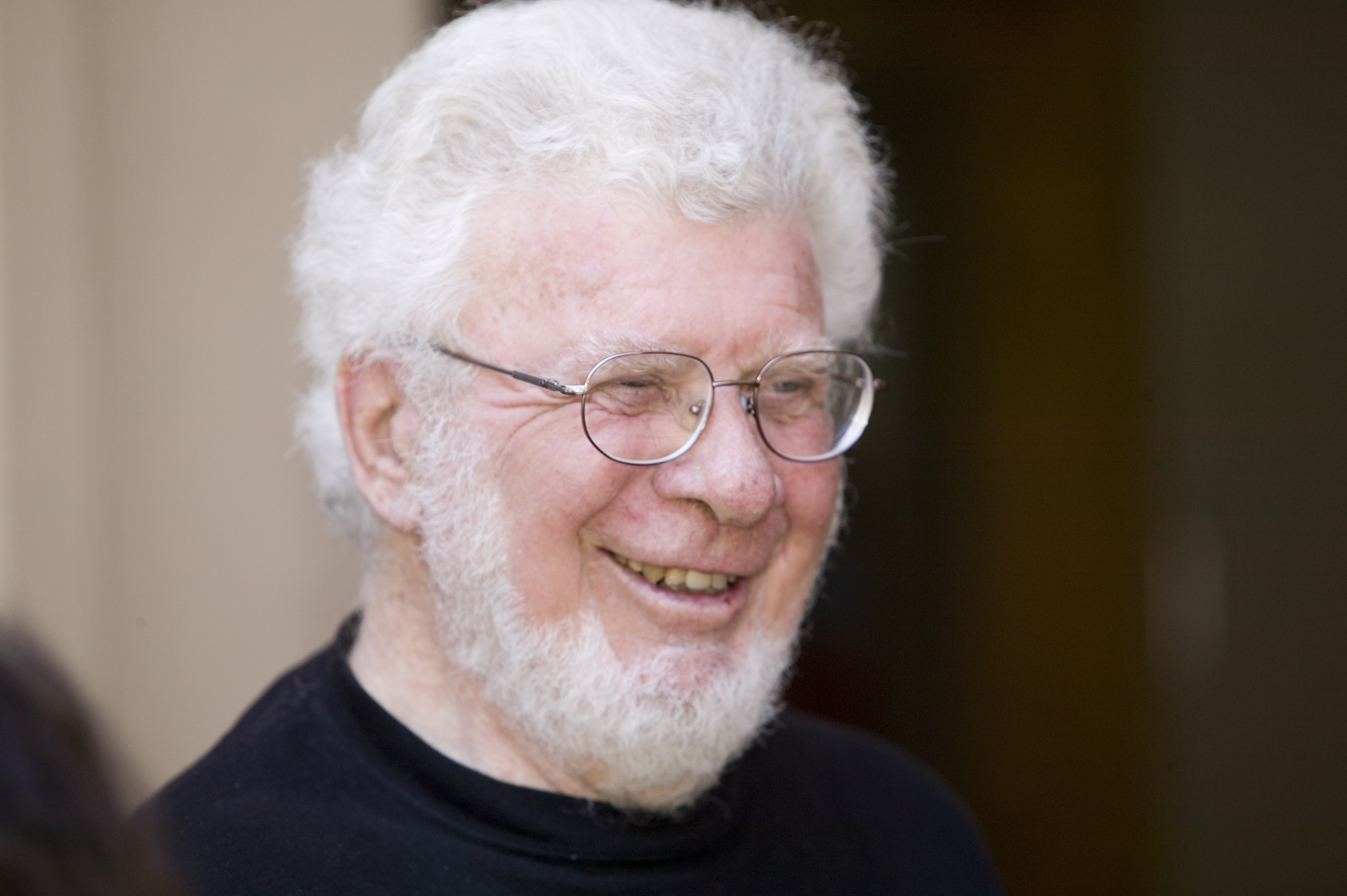
- Herzenberg in 2006
- Born: Leonard Arthur Herzenberg; November 5, 1931; New York City, US
- Died: October 27, 2013 (aged 81); Stanford, California, US
- Education: Brooklyn College; California Institute of Technology
- Known for: Flow cytometry (FACS)
- Spouse: Leonore Herzenberg
- Children: 4, including Jana
- Awards: Kyoto Prize (2006)
- Scientific career
- Fields: Immunology, genetics
- Workplaces: Stanford University; Pasteur Institute
- Thesis: Studies on a Cytochrome Destroying System in Neurospora (1956)
- Doctoral advisor: Herschel K. Mitchell
- Doctoral students: Garry Nolan

Leonard Arthur "Len" Herzenberg (November 5, 1931 – October 27, 2013) was an immunologist, geneticist and professor at Stanford University. His contributions to the development of cell biology made it possible to sort viable cells by their specific properties.

== Early life and education ==
Herzenberg was born in New York City, on November 5, 1931 to a Jewish family. He received his bachelor's degree in 1952 from Brooklyn College in biology and chemistry. In 1955, he received his Ph.D. from California Institute of Technology in biochemistry with a specialization in immunology for studies on cytochrome in Neurospora.

== Career ==
After school he was a postdoctoral fellow at the American Cancer Society, working in France at the Pasteur Institute. He returned to the United States in 1957 and worked for the National Institutes of Health as an officer in the Public Health Service department. He started working at Stanford in 1959. He eventually earned the title Professor of Genetics.

Herzenberg and his wife, Leonore Herzenberg, ran the Herzenberg Laboratory at Stanford together In 1970 they developed the fluorescence-activated cell sorter which revolutionized immunology and cancer biology, and is the basis for purification of adult stem cells. When receiving the Kyoto Prize for this work in 2006, Leonard Herzenberg's only regret was "I only wish it were possible to be shared with my wife and lifelong colleague, Leonore Herzenberg."

During a sabbatical in the laboratory of Cesar Milstein between 1976 and 1977, Herzenberg coined the term hybridoma for hybrid cells that result from the fusion of B cells and myeloma cells.

== Personal life ==
The daughter of Len and Lee Herzenberg, Jana Herzen, is a singer-songwriter and the founder of Motéma Music. Len Herzenberg died on October 27, 2013, aged 81.

== Awards and honours ==
Herzenberg received a range of honours and awards during his life including:

- 1998 American Association of Immunologists Lifetime Achievement Award
- 2002 Edwin F. Ullman Award, American Association of Clinical Chemistry
- 2004 Special Novartis Prize for Immunology (the only winner of this award)
- 2005 Abbott Laboratories Award in Clinical and Diagnostic Immunology, American Society for Microbiology
- 2006 Kyoto award for his work in cell biology;
- 2007 Ceppellini Award, International Foundation for Research in Experimental Medicine, with his wife Lee Herzenberg for "their internationally recognized contributions to medicine"
- 2013 ABRF Annual Award for Outstanding Contributions to Biomolecular Technologies
