= A Lovesome Thing =

A Lovesome Thing may refer to:

- A Lovesome Thing (Frank Morgan album), 1991
- A Lovesome Thing (Geri Allen and Kurt Rosenwinkel album), 2023
