= Leonore Herzenberg =

American immunologist, geneticist and professor (born 1935)

- Born: Leonore Alderstein; February 15, 1935 (age 91); New York City, US
- Spouse: Leonard Herzenberg
- Children: 4, including Jana
- Scientific career
- Fields: Immunology, genetics
- Workplaces: Stanford University

Leonore Alderstein "Lee" Herzenberg (born February 15, 1935) is an American immunologist, geneticist and professor at Stanford University. Born in New York City, she never received a college degree but studied biology and worked as a researcher alongside her husband Leonard since he began his doctorate at the California Institute of Technology in 1952. At the time, Caltech did not accept women, but although she was registered at Pomona College nearby, Lee was allowed to audit courses and take tests at Caltech.

Leonard and Leonore Herzenberg ran the Herzenberg Laboratory at Stanford together. Len always supported her role as a leader in science. In 1970 they developed the fluorescence-activated cell sorter which revolutionized immunology and cancer biology, and is the basis for purification of adult stem cells. In 1989, they proposed a layered immune system hypothesis for the development of immune cells from stem cells that has been supported by experimental evidence nearly 30 years later.

In 1981, the University of Paris gave Lee the title of Doctor of Science. When receiving the Kyoto Prize in 2006, Leonard Herzenberg regretted only that "I only wish it were possible to be shared with my wife and lifelong colleague, Leonore Herzenberg."

Lee and Len Herzenberg had four children: Jana Herzen, formerly Janet Herzenberg, is a singer-songwriter and the founder of Motéma Music; Berri H. Michel owns a bicycle shop in Santa Cruz, California; Rick; and Michael.
