= Rondi Charleston =

American jazz vocalist, journalist

- Born: Chicago, Illinois, U.S.
- Genre: Jazz
- Occupations: Musician, songwriter, journalist
- Instrument: Vocals
- Years active: 2001–present
- Labels: Motéma, LML, Emmamuse
- Website: rondicharleston.com

Rondi Charleston is an American jazz vocalist and songwriter (in collaboration with Lynne Arriale). She is also an Emmy- and Peabody Award-winning television journalist and investigative reporter for Primetime.

== Early life ==
Charleston was born in Chicago, and grew up in the Hyde Park neighborhood, the only daughter of an English professor father and voice teacher/singer mother. Her father, a jazz enthusiast, played jazz piano, and took her to a performance by Duke Ellington, where she met the man. After performing as a guest artist with the University of Chicago's theatre program, she enrolled at Juilliard as a theatre major, but soon transferred to music. She also studied journalism at New York University, desiring to work with Charles Kuralt.

== Journalism career ==
While in school, she discovered a Metropolitan Transportation Authority cover-up that claimed a train crash was caused by an engineer high on illegal drugs, when no illegal drugs were in his system, according to the coroner's report. ABC News hired her when she broke the story, and she worked with Diane Sawyer for the next five years. She then worked at NBC News for a year before taking time off to be a mother.

== Music career ==
During her time off from journalism, she studied jazz singing with Peter Eldridge of New York Voices, and began performing in Greenwich Village.

Her third album, In My Life, had a special promotion with Virgin Megastore, which sold it with an exclusive live DVD.

== Personal life and family ==
Paul Newman and Joanne Woodward were among her neighbors; she considers them role models for raising her family.

Her mother continues to teach voice lessons in Chicago. Her father hosts a classical music program for Philadelphia radio, and her brother plays percussion with the New York Philharmonic.

== Discography ==
- Love Letters (LML, 2001)
- Love Is the Thing (LML, 2004)
- In My Life (Emmamuse Productions, 2009)
- Who Knows Where the Time Goes (Motéma, 2011)
- Signs of Life (Motéma, 2013)
- Resilience (Resilience, 2017)
- Suspended in Time (Resilience, 2025) with pianist Fred Hersch
