= Oran Etkin =

- Born: May 18, 1979; Israel
- Genres: Jazz, folk, world music, children's music
- Occupation: Musician
- Instruments: Clarinet, saxophone
- Years active: 2008–present
- Label: Motéma
- Website: oranetkin.com

Oran Etkin is a jazz and world music musician.

== Biography ==
A native of Israel, after moving with his family to Boston, he took piano lessons when he was five years old. At fourteen he studied clarinet with Yusef Lateef and George Garzone. He attended Brandeis University and concentrated on economics and classical clarinet. He received a master's degree in jazz from the Manhattan School of Music. He plays alto clarinet, bass clarinet, and tenor saxophone.

After leaving the Manhattan School of Music, he was hired as a teacher in New York City. Inspired by that experience, Etkin invented a teaching method called Timbalooloo to teach music to children as young as three years old.

In 1998, Etkin took an African dance class in Boston that was taught by Joh Camara, a percussionist from Mali. He joined his teacher's band, which included Camara's uncle, Balla Tounkara, a kora player. Visits to Mali increased his interest in the music.

His debut album, Kelenia (Motema, 2009), combined jazz with the Malian music and was recorded with three musicians from Mali: Abdoulaye Diabaté, Makane Kouyate, and Balla Kouyate (on balafon) The album includes an African version of "It Don't Mean a Thing (If It Ain't Got That Swing)". Other musicians on the album include Camara (on talking drum), violinist Sara Caswell, and guitarist Lionel Loueke.

== Awards and honors ==
Etkin recorded a song for the children's album Healthy Food for Thought. The album received a Grammy Award nomination and a nomination at the Independent Music Awards.

== Discography ==
=== As leader ===
- Kelenia (Motéma, 2009)
- Gathering Light (Motema, 2014)
- What's New? (Motema, 2015)

=== As guest ===
- Wake Up Clarinet! (Motéma, 2010)
