= Be My Monster Love =

2013 album by David Murray's Infinity Quartet featuring Macy Gray & Gregory Porter

Studio album by David Murray Infinity Quartet featuring Macy Gray & Gregory Porter
- Released: June 11, 2013
- Recorded: July 16, 2012
- Genre: Jazz
- Length: 66:34
- Label: Motéma; MTM 112
- Producer: Valerie Malot & David Murray

David Murray chronology
Plays Nat King Cole en Español (2010)	Be My Monster Love (2013)

Be My Monster Love is an album by saxophonist David Murray's Infinity Quartet with guest vocalists Macy Gray and Gregory Porter, released in 2013 on the Motéma label.

== Reception ==
Professional ratings
Review scores
Source	Rating
AllMusic	3.5/5 stars

The AllMusic review by Thom Jurek stated: "Be My Monster Love is a diverse, travel modern creative jazz through a prismatic lens. While Murray's compositions are tighter and more song-like than ever (the presence of these excellent vocalists highlights this), he simultaneously offers a group of stellar players the opportunity (collectively and individually) to shine and push their margins. Highly recommended". JazzTimes observed, "For all the concepts in motion, this is one of Murray’s most relaxed albums in a while. More often than not, he’s in classic tenor mode, pouring out bruisingly melodic lines". On All About Jazz, Phil Barnes said, "Jazz seems to struggle to cross over these days, but gems such as these are still there to be unearthed – they may not have the media profile of the past but the musical quality and innovation remains. Lets hope that someone out there in the mainstream is listening".

== Track listing ==
All compositions by David Murray except as indicated

1. "French Kiss for Valerie" – 6:55
2. "Be My Monster Love" (lyrics by Ishmael Reed) – 6:35
3. "Stressology" – 6:45
4. "Army of the Faithful (Joyful Noise)" (lyrics by Ishmael Reed) – 6:19
5. "Sorrow Song" – 8:58
6. "About the Children" (lyrics by Abiodun Oyewole) – 7:49
7. "The Graduate" – 5:41
8. "Hope Is a Thing with Feathers" (lyrics by Ishmael Reed) – 7:19

== Personnel ==
- David Murray – tenor saxophone, bass clarinet
- Marc Cary – piano, organ
- Jaribu Shahid – bass
- Nasheet Waits – drums
- Bobby Bradford – cornet (track 7)
- Macy Gray (track 2), Gregory Porter (tracks 4, 6 & 8) – vocals
