= René Marie =

American singer-songwriter

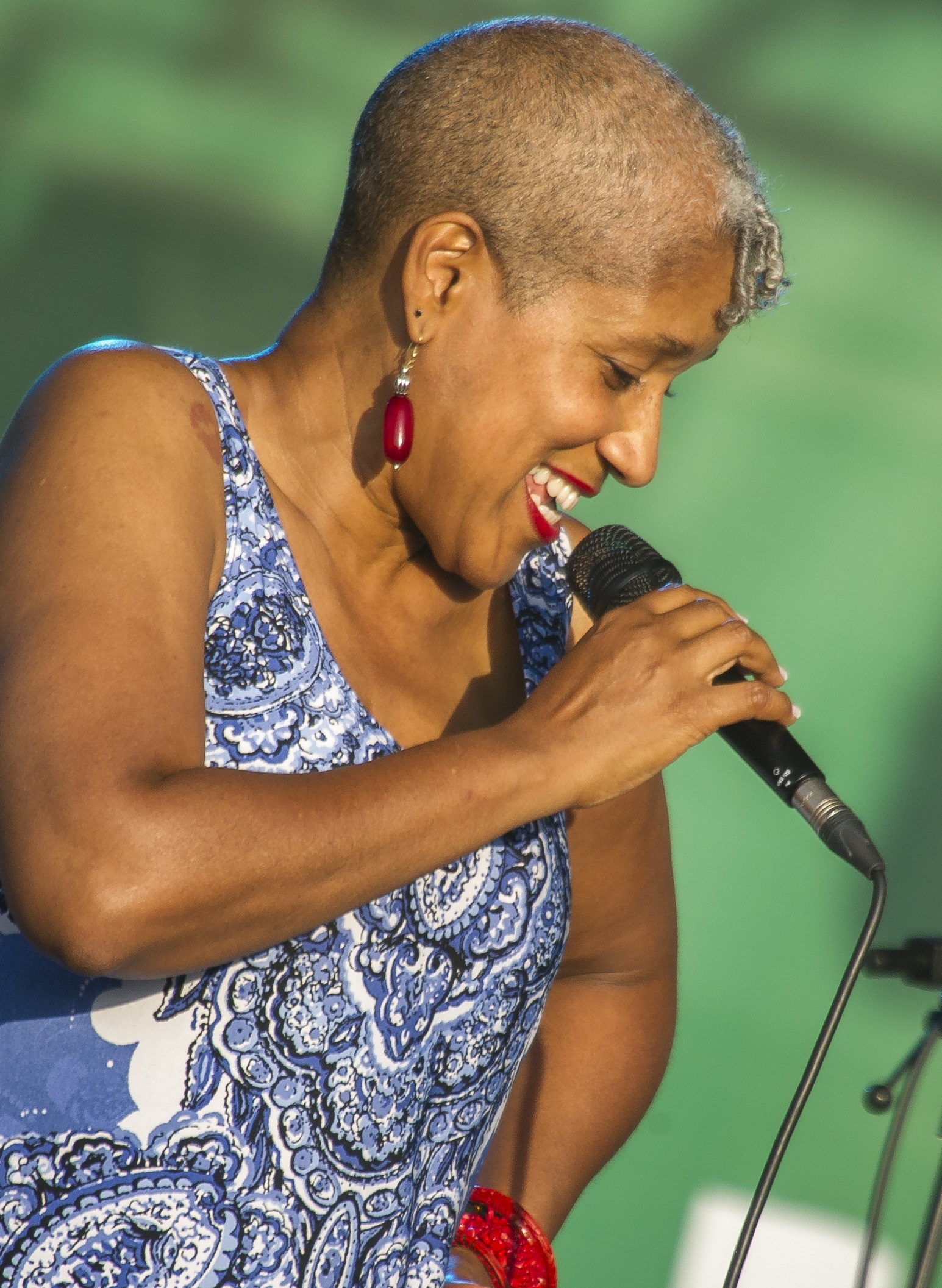
- Marie performing in 2014

Background information
- Born: René Marie Stevens; November 7, 1955 (age 71); Warrenton, Virginia, United States
- Origin: Washington, D.C., United States
- Genre: Jazz
- Occupations: Singer, songwriter
- Years active: 1997–present
- Labels: MAXJAZZ, Motéma
- Website: renemarie.com

René Marie (born René Marie Stevens, November 7, 1955 in Warrenton, Virginia, United States) is an American songwriter and jazz vocalist.

== Early Life ==
René Marie Stevens was born and raised in Warrenton, Virginia, where she was the fifth child in a busy household of seven other siblings. René spent a majority of her childhood immersed in a highly eclectic acoustic environment where she learned about a wide spectrum of multiple musical genres ranging from blues, traditional folk, bluegrass, gospel harmony, Western classical, and grand opera. During her early years, René took piano lessons for two years and developed an intuitive ear for melody; however, despite her musical background, she did not immediately follow a direct path toward producing music in a professional recording studio.

René married at a young age, at 18 years old, and spent the next twenty years being part of a domestic life. She raised two children and worked stable day jobs, such as working for a small period of time at a local bank to help support her family. Even so, beneath the calm routine of her everyday life, a creative spirit waited to be released as it clawed its way through with growing intensity. By the time she turned 23, and as a mother of two young boys, she began to feel the weight of suppressing her artistic aspirations. It wasn’t until a decisive turning point rose after 23 years of matrimony, when domestic tensions were piling up ended with a final demand from her husband, who demanded that she permanently choose between continuing her family responsibilities and her yearning to pursue singing. Ultimately choosing to pursue her own identity and honor her self-worth, René made the courageous decision to walk away from her marriage. She was able to reconnect with local musicians who breathed new life into her suppressed spirit and granted her the emotional foundation that was needed to start a completely independent destiny centered around music.

== Career Breakthrough ==
René officially made her way into the professional music scene and launched her professional recording career in 1999 at the age of 42, building on decades of personal life experience and beginning to perform under her married name, René Croan. In 1999, she independently produced and released her debut studio album, Renaissance, which generated a rapid response across the mid-Atlantic jazz society. That same year, she performed at Washington, D.C.’s legendary jazz venue Blues Alley, which gave her significant exposure and caught the critical eye of executives at the St. Louis-based independent label Maxjazz.

== Career ==
Rene Marie released four albums on the label, the second of which (Vertigo) was awarded a coronet ranking by The Penguin Guide to Jazz, a distinction given to fewer than 85 recordings in jazz history. In her work, the singer often combines contrasting songs ("Dixie" and the anti-lynching "Strange Fruit" on Vertigo) or combines other works (Ravel's Boléro and Leonard Cohen's "Suzanne" on Live at Jazz Standard.)

René Marie attracted controversy in 2008, when she was invited to sing "The Star-Spangled Banner" at a civic event in Denver, and substituted the song's lyrics with those from "Lift Every Voice and Sing." This arrangement of the national anthem forms part of the titular suite of Marie's 2011 CD, The Voice of My Beautiful Country (Motéma Music). She specializes in writing her own music, commenting that this is not the norm in jazz in one of her songs, "This for Joe," after a club manager got angry with her for singing originals. Her 2011 release, Black Lace Freudian Slip contains only three songs that she did not write, and one of those was written by her son, Michael A. Croan, who performs on the track with her.

She released a number of singles in 2007–2009 focused on homeless issues, "This Is Not a Protest Song", and the racial problems in Jena, Louisiana, "3 Nooses Hanging".

Besides her purely musical works, she has also written, produced and performed a one-woman show of words and music, Slut Energy Theory – U'Dean, in which she explores the journey from sexual abuse to self-esteem. More recent productions of the show have shortened the title to "Slut Energy Theory." The soundtrack to this show has been released.

A short (approximately 13-minute) documentary, "Tuning René Marie" was directed by Rachel Kessler and produced by Polina Buchak, a Ukrainian film producer currently based in NY. It premiered at the Woodstock Film Festival in New York. It won the programmer's award for the best short documentary at the Virginia Film Festival.

== Discography ==
- Renaissance (Flat 5, 1999) – as René Croan
- How Can I Keep from Singing? (Maxjazz, 2000)
- Vertigo (Maxjazz, 2001)
- Live at the Jazz Standard (Maxjazz, 2003)
- Serene Renegade (Maxjazz, 2004)
- Experiment in Truth (2007)
- Black Lace Freudian Slip (Motema, 2011)
- Voice of My Beautiful Country (Motema, 2011)
- I Wanna Be Evil: With Love to Eartha Kitt (Motema, 2013)
- Sound of Red (Motema, 2016)
- Darius de Haas, Rene Marie, Karen Oberlin, Janis Siegel, Ice on the Hudson: Songs by Renee Rosnes and David Hajdu (SMK, 2018)
