= Petros Klampanis =

Greek bassist (born 1981)

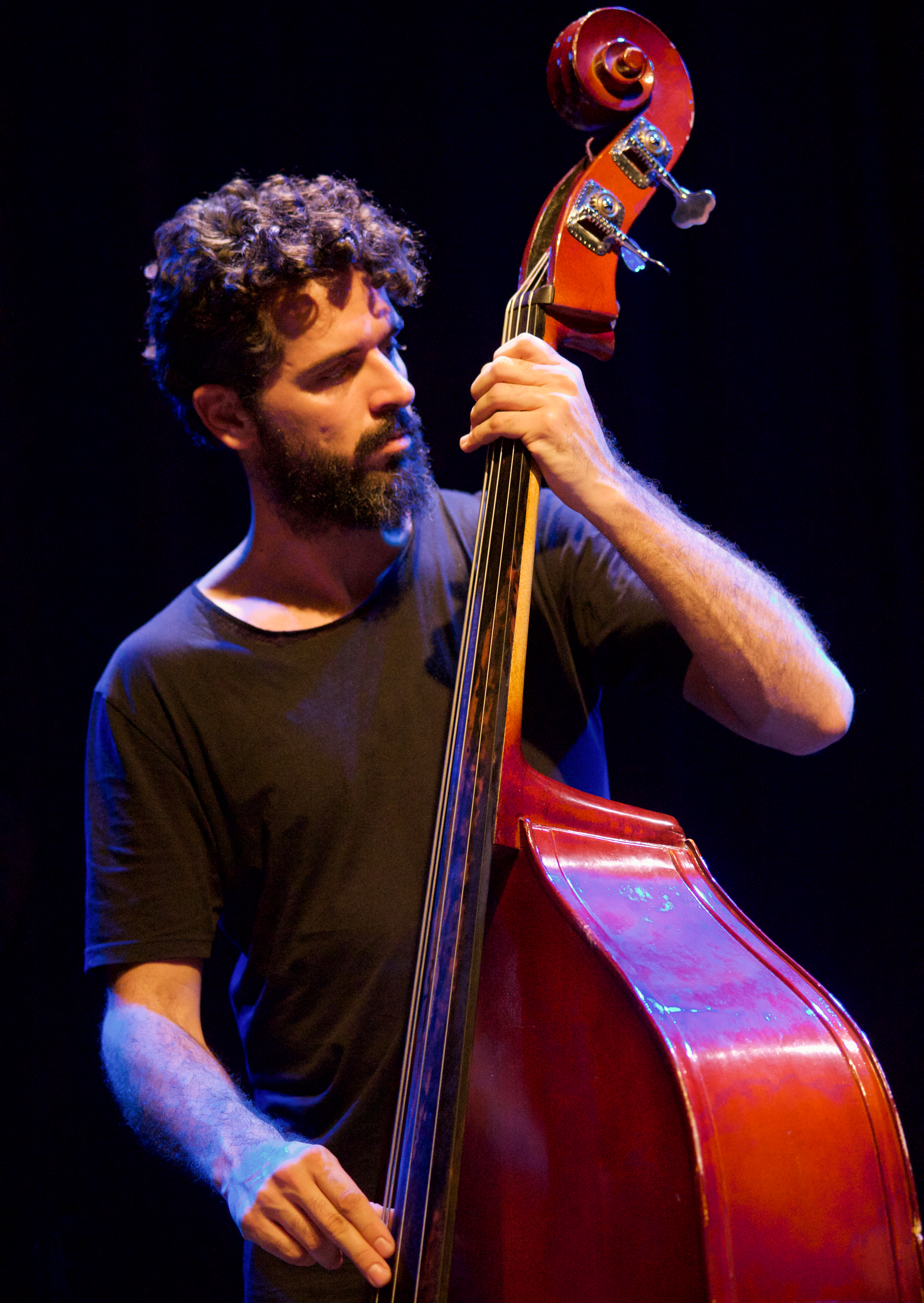

Background information
- Born: July 15, 1981 (age 45); Zakynthos, Greece
- Genre: Jazz
- Occupations: Musician, Composer, Arranger, Producer
- Instruments: Double bass
- Years active: 2001–present
- Labels: Enja/Yellowbird, PKmusik, ECM Records, Agate/Inpartmaint, Motéma, Inner Circle Music, Cristal, Minos EMI/Universal, Good Monopoly/Korea; publisher: Universal Music Publishing Group
- Website: petrosklampanis.com

Petros Klampanis (Greek: Πέτρος Κλαμπάνης, born July 15, 1981) is a Greek jazz bassist, composer, arranger, and producer. Known for blending jazz with Mediterranean and Balkan folk influences, he is the founder of the independent label PKmusik, which features a range of artists from diverse backgrounds.

== Early life and education ==
Klampanis was born on July 15, 1981, on the island of Zakynthos, Greece. He grew up in a musical environment shaped by Greek folk traditions and initially enrolled in mechanical engineering in Athens before deciding to pursue music. He left the Polytechnic School in Athens to study jazz bass performance at the Amsterdam Conservatory in the Netherlands in 2005. He later completed his studies at the Aaron Copland School of Music at Queens College in New York City. After moving to New York, Klampanis began performing in the city’s jazz scene, playing alongside notable musicians such as saxophonist Greg Osby, pianist Jean-Michel Pilc, and guitarist Gilad Hekselman.

== Career ==
Klampanis’s relationship with Greg Osby helped launch his recording career. His debut album as a leader, Contextual (2011), was released on Osby’s Inner Circle Music label. The album drew praise from critics and prominent bassists; for example, veteran bassist Arild Andersen hailed it as “one of the most exciting projects I have heard from a bass player in years.” Klampanis’s second album, Minor Dispute (2015), further raised his profile. Minor Dispute was selected by NPR as one of the best jazz recordings of 2015, noting Klampanis’s distinctive integration of string arrangements and Eastern Mediterranean melodies into jazz.

In 2017, Klampanis released Chroma on Motéma Music, a live album recorded with a string ensemble and jazz quartet. Chroma was named Best Live Album in the 2017 Independent Music Awards, underscoring the album’s innovative blend of jazz improvisation with chamber music elements. His next project, Irrationalities (2019), was a piano trio album (featuring pianist Kristjan Randalu and percussionist Bodek Janke) released by Enja/Yellowbird Records. Irrationalities was acclaimed in the jazz press—JazzTimes described it as “a dazzling, multifaceted thing of beauty” and it earned Klampanis multiple Independent Music Awards. At the 2020 IMAs, Irrationalities won in three categories, including Best Jazz Instrumental (for the track “Easy Come, Easy Go”), the Vox Pop fan vote for Best Jazz Song, and Best Jazz Producer for Klampanis’s work on the album.

During the COVID-19 pandemic, Klampanis recorded a solo bass project titled Rooftop Stories (2020). The Rooftop Stories album, recorded on a rooftop in Athens, showcases Klampanis performing alone on double bass (sometimes singing and using electronic looping) and interpreting jazz standards, Greek folk songs, and originals. In 2023, he released Tora Collective, his sixth album as a leader, on Enja, which won the Quarterly Preis der deutschen Schallplattenkritik for "Traditional Ethnic Music" and was chosen as one of the best albums of 2023 by DownBeat Magazine. His seventh album, Latent Info, was released in February 2025. Recorded live in one room with Estonian pianist Kristjan Randalu and Israeli drummer Ziv Ravitz, Latent Info continues Klampanis’s exploration of the piano trio format.

== Selected collaborations ==
In addition to his work as a leader, Petros Klampanis is an in-demand sideman and collaborator in both jazz and world music settings. He is a longtime member of tenor saxophonist Oded Tzur’s quartet, appearing as the bassist on Tzur’s first three albums for ECM Records: Here Be Dragons (2020), Isabela (2022), and My Prophet (2024), all produced by Manfred Eicher. Klampanis has also worked closely with Pakistani vocalist Arooj Aftab. He contributed string arrangements and upright bass to Aftab’s critically acclaimed album Night Reign (2024) . In July 2025, Klampanis joined Aftab on stage at the BBC Proms at Royal Albert Hall, performing orchestral versions of her music with the BBC Symphony Orchestra (conducted by Jules Buckley). Aftab’s BBC Proms debut prominently featured Klampanis as her bassist, and orchestrator, highlighting their ongoing collaboration.

Klampanis has worked with numerous other prominent musicians, including Greg Osby, Gilad Hekselman, Maria Farantouri, and Anoushka Shankar. He has performed alongside Snarky Puppy and has worked with Christos Rafalides, Dimitra Galani, Thana Alexa, Antonio Sanchez, John Hadfield, Marcus Gilmore, and Banda Magda on several cross-cultural and world-jazz projects. He has also worked with sound engineers Fab Dupont and James Farber.

== Discography ==
Discography
Year	Title	Label	Role
2011	Contextual	Inner Circle Music	Leader
2015	Minor Dispute	Inner Circle Music	Leader
2017	Chroma	Motéma Music	Leader
2019	Irrationalities	Enja/Yellowbird	Leader
2020	Rooftop Stories	PKmusik	Leader
2023	Tora Collective	Enja/Yellowbird	Leader
2025	Latent Info	Enja/PKmusik	Leader
2027	'96	Enja/PKmusik	Leader

== Selected sideman/producer credits ==
Selected sideman/producer credits
Artist	Album	Label	Year	Role
Dimitra Galani	Chronos Project	Minos EMI	2017	Co-producer, bassist
Oded Tzur	Here Be Dragons	ECM Records	2020	Bassist
Thomas Konstantinou, Nikos Xydakis	Erotiko	Worker Records	2020	Producer, bassist
Arooj Aftab	Vulture Prince	New Amsterdam Records	2021	Bassist, co-arranger
Oded Tzur	Isabela	ECM Records	2022	Bassist
Andreas Polyzogopoulos	Petrichor	PKmusik	2023	Producer, bassist
Oded Tzur	My Prophet	ECM Records	2024	Bassist
Arooj Aftab	Night Reign	Verve Records	2024	Bassist, co-arranger

== Awards and honors ==
Awards and honors
Year	Award	Category	Work
2017	Independent Music Awards	Best Live Album	Chroma
2017	DownBeat Magazine	Best Albums of the Year	Chroma
2020	Independent Music Awards	Best Jazz Producer	Irrationalities
2020	Independent Music Awards	Best Jazz Instrumental	“Easy Come, Easy Go”
2020	Independent Music Awards	Vox Pop Fan Award	“Easy Come, Easy Go”
2023	Preis der Deutschen Schallplattenkritik	Traditional Ethnic Music (Q2)	Tora Collective
2023	DownBeat Magazine	Best Albums of the Year	Tora Collective
2025	Preis der Deutschen Schallplattenkritik	World Music (Q2)	Latent Info (nominated)
