= A Moving Sound =

Taiwanese music act

聲動樂團 A Moving Sound
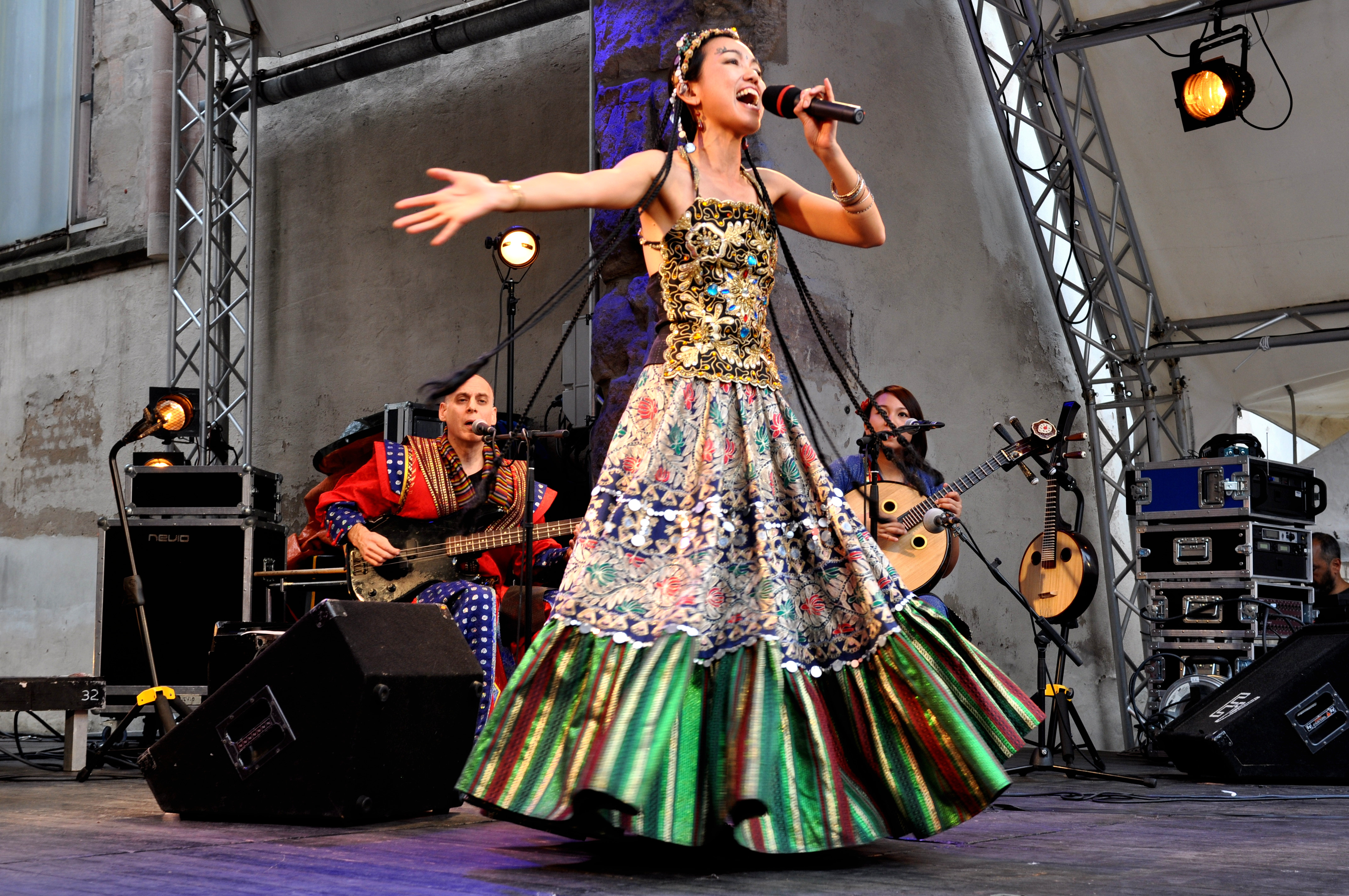

Background information
- Origin: Taipei, Taiwan
- Genres: World music
- Years active: 2000–present
- Label: https://www.arcmusic.co.uk/
- Members: Mia Hsieh; Scott Prairie co-directors
- Website: http://www.amovingsound.com

A Moving Sound (Chinese: 聲動樂團) or Sheng Dong is a Taiwanese performance group co-directed by vocalist/dancer Mia Hsieh, vocalist, bass guitarist and zhong ruan player Scott Prairie. They are accompanied by host of wonderfully talented Taiwanese musicians.

In A Moving Sound's music traditional Taiwanese music forms are reinterpreted to create new original song compositions. Instruments such as the erhu (fiddle), the zhong ruan (lute), and the transcendent vocals and dance of lead singer Mia Hsieh, transport listeners on a journey that Global Rhythm magazine described as “...delicately balanced between many worlds...an entryway to Eastern music and artful expression of the human condition."

A Moving Sound has attracted international attention for opening doors to the under explored territory of Far Eastern music. The group is intensely passionate about how it presents the use of traditional instruments in its contemporary sound. Their approach is to be holistic – combining art, spirituality, social awareness, and a universal love of humanity play key roles in the creative process.

According to Tom Pryor, music supervisor for National Geographic, "A Moving Sound is one of the most original outfits working in the world music arena today, an inspired marriage of Taiwanese traditional sounds and Western pop experimentation that forges an important new musical dialogue." The Public Theater called their work "an exciting new development in the progression of Chinese music, joyous, evocative and enchanting.

They have performed all around the world, including well known festival WOMAD(BBC Radio3 stage), Kennedy center etc.. Their music was featured on Lonely Planet's program, Six Degrees, and on BBC, NPR, PRI. After releasing three albums in Taiwan, the group made their US debut on Motéma Music with a self-titled release in 2011. Their three albums are now available through ARC Music https://www.arcmusic.co.uk/

== Genesis ==
The group was formed in 2000, while Mia Hsieh was on a trip to New York City to study with Meredith Monk, Lynn Book. She met Scott Prairie, and began the group in Taiwan. Prairie was sent to Carnegie Mellon University to study horn, but changed his major to psychology. He returned to music via bass guitar while visiting Europe. The two began an ensemble fusing Taiwanese traditional music with other musical styles found in Taiwan and music from surrounding Asia synthesized through their own unique artistic and spiritual vision.

== Tour ==
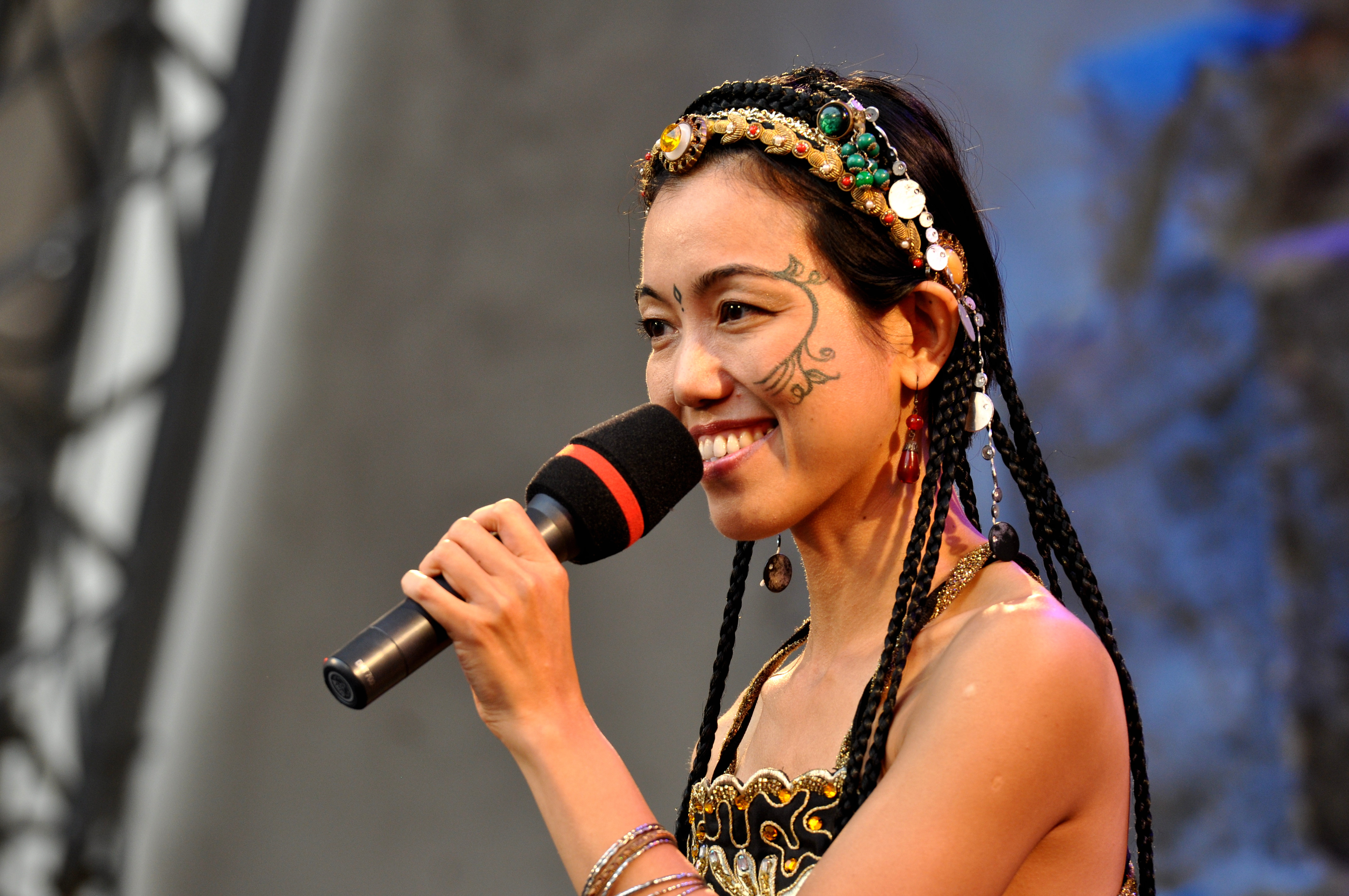
Mia Hsieh with A Moving Sound at the festival Bardentreffen in Nuremberg 2015

Western Arts Alliance Juried Showcase, Seattle WA 2017 Arts Midwest Spotlight Showcase, Columbus OH 2017 Oregon Shakespeare Festival 2016 Regis College, Boston 2016 North Michigan University, US 2015 Detroit Institute of Art, US 2015 Illinois University, Urbana-Champaign, US 2015 Williams College, MA, US 2015 Queens Museum, New York, US 2015 University of North Carolina, Asheville, US LEAF Festival, North Carolina, US 2015 REDCAT Roy and Edna Disney/Calarts Theater, Los Angeles 2015 Melbourne International Arts Festival, Australia 2015 Nelson Arts Festival New Zealand 2015 Dunedin Arts Festival New Zealand 2014 Tübingen University Germany 2014 Pohoda Festival Slovakia 2014 Zagan City Poland 2014 Colours of Ostrava Festival Czech Republic 2014 Heidelberg University Germany 2014 Masala Festival Germany 2014 Les Aubes Musicales Switzerland 2014 Madison WI World Music festival 2014 Chippewa Valley WI Heyde Center 2014 University of Massachusetts 2014 Boise State University Idaho 2014 Skagit College Mcintyre Hall Mt Vernon WA 2014 Humanitas World Music festival Washington State University 2014 Lincoln City Culture Center Oregon 2014 Globalquerque World Music Festival, New Mexico 2013 Northern Arizona State University, Arizona 2013 Great Performances at Vanderbilt Univ. Series, Tennessee 2013 The Kennedy Center, Washington DC 2013 George Washington University, Washington DC 2013 Flushing Council on Culture and the Arts, New York 2013 Dartmouth College, New Hampshire 2013 WOMAD BBC Radio3 stage, England 2012 Itinerari Festival, Trento Italy 2012 Small World Festival, Toronto 2011 Towson University, Towson MD 2011 University of California, Berkeley 2011 CSU, Monterey Bay World Theater 2011 Water and Music Festival, Qing Hi China 2010 STADT Contemporary Arts Center, Munich 2010 Shanghai World Exposition 2010 RichMix Arts Center, London 2010 Satellit Café, Paris Showcase 2010 World Village Festival, Helsinki, Finland 2010 Festival of Cultural Diversity, Costellon Spain 2010 Culture Del Mondo, Cuneo, Italy -2009 Fest Der Kulturen, Augsburg, Germany – 2009 Dunya Festival, Netherlands -2008 Global Sound Healing Conference, Los Angeles - 2008 Grand Performances, Los Angeles – 2007 Harbourfront Centre, Toronto – 2007 The Rubin Museum, New York City – 2007 Ollin Kan Festival, Mexico City -2007 The Quebec City Festival, Canada -2007 Grassroots Festival, Ithaca NY – 2007 Chicago World Music Festival – 2007 WOMEX, Music Exposition Spain – 2006 MOFFOM Festival, Prague, CZ – 2006 The New York Public Theater – 2006

== Discography ==
- Little Universe (2004; repackaged 2009)
- Songs Beyond Words (2007)
- Starshine (2009)
- A Moving Sound [compilation] (Motéma Music, 2011)
