= Sound of Red =

Studio album by René Marie
- Released: 2016
- Length: Jazz
- Label: Motéma

René Marie chronology
I Wanna Be Evil (2013)	Sound of Red (2016)

Sound of Red is an album by René Marie. It earned Marie a Grammy Award nomination for Best Jazz Vocal Album.
