= Gilad Hekselman =

Israeli-born jazz guitarist

Gilad Hekselman גלעד הקסלמן
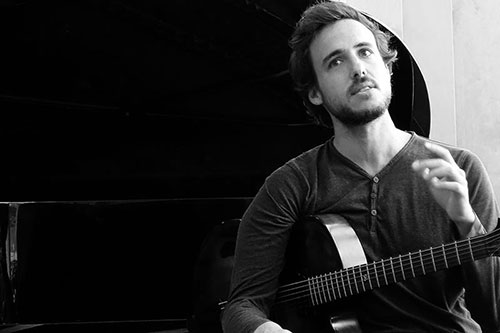

Background information
- Born: February 3, 1983 (age 43); Israel
- Genres: Jazz
- Occupation: Musician
- Instrument: Guitar
- Labels: Smalls, Jazz Village, Le Chant du Monde, Motema, Edition, Whirlwind
- Website: www.giladhekselman.com

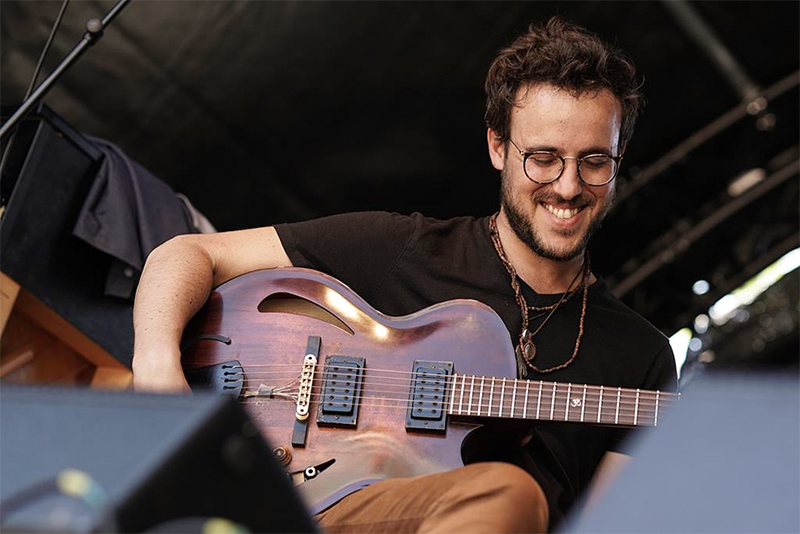
Gilad Hekselman (2018) at Aarhus Jazz Festival, Denmark

Gilad Hekselman (Hebrew: גלעד הקסלמן; born February 3, 1983) is an Israeli-born jazz guitarist. He has performed with Anat Cohen, Mark Turner, Dayna Stephens, Aaron Parks, Jeff Ballard, John Scofield, Ari Hoenig, Chris Potter and Joey Alexander.

== Biography ==
Hekselman was born in Kfar Saba. He moved to New York City in 2004 to attend The New School for Jazz and Contemporary Music on a scholarship. In July 2005 he won the Gibson–Montreux Jazz Festival Guitar Competition in Switzerland.

Hekselman's albums include Splitlife (2006), Words Unspoken (2008), Hearts Wide Open (2011), This Just In (2013), and Homes (2015). Hekselman was featured on the album Radio Music Society by Esperanza Spalding.

Hekselman's working quartet includes saxophonist Mark Turner, bassist Joe Martin, and drummer Marcus Gilmore; they performed on NPR on The Checkout: Live in May 2012.

Hekselman lives in New York with his wife and their children.

== Discography ==
=== As leader ===
- Splitlife (Smalls, 2006)
- Words Unspoken (LateSet, 2008)
- Hearts Wide Open (Le Chant du Monde, 2011)
- This Just In (Jazz Village, 2013)
- Homes (Jazz Village, 2015)
- Ask for Chaos (Motéma, 2018)
- Further Chaos (Motéma, 2019)
- Zuperoctave: Eyes of the World (Newvelle, 2019)
- Trio Grande (Whirlwind), 2020)
- Far Star (Edition, 2022)

=== As sideman ===
- Anat Cohen, Notes from the Village (Anzic, 2008)
- Ari Hoenig, Bert's Playground (Dreyfus, 2008)
- Pat Bianchi, Back Home (Doodlin, 2010)
- Ari Hoenig, Lines of Oppression (self released, 2010)
- Esperanza Spalding, Radio Music Society (Heads Up, 2012)
- Petros Klampanis, Minor Dispute (Inner Circle Music, 2015)
- Niels Wilhelm Knudsen, Abandoned Places (Gateway 2016)
- Anat Cohen, Luminosa (Anzic, 2015)
- Julian Shore, Which Way Now? (Tone Rogue, 2016)
- Petros Klampanis, Chroma (Motema, 2017)
- Christian Sands, Reach (Mack Avenue, 2017)
- Lorraine Feather, Math Camp (Relarion, 2018)
- Ari Hoenig, NY Standard (Fresh Sound, 2018)
- Ben Wendel, The Seasons (Motema, 2018)
- Oded Tzur, Make A Sound (Sky River Music, 2026)

=== Guest ===
- Revocation - New Gods, New Masters (2025)
