= Motéma Music =

American record label

- Founded: 2003, San Francisco Bay Area
- Founder: Jana Herzen
- Distributors: The Orchard, PIAS
- Genre: Jazz; world
- Country of origin: United States
- Location: New York City; San Francisco
- Official website: www.motema.com

Motéma Music is a jazz and world music record label in the United States. It was founded in 2003 in San Francisco Bay Area by label president and recording artist Jana Herzen. The label has received Grammy recognition more than 25 times for albums in jazz, Latin jazz, reggae, and R&B. Motema's roster includes Gregory Porter, Joey Alexander, Deva Mahal, Pedrito Martinez, Randy Weston, Geri Allen, David Murray, Monty Alexander, and Charnett Moffett, Donny McCaslin, Mark Guiliana, and Terri Lyne Carrington and many other respected artists in jazz, world and soul music.

== History ==
Motéma Music was founded in the San Francisco Bay Area. A production company since 2003, Motema was started by singer Jana Herzen to release her music, starting with her debut album Soup's on Fire 1999 released before the label had landed international distribution. She chose "Motema" because it translates to "heart" in the Bantu language Lingala. The label was officially founded in 2003 in San Francisco, and moved to New York City in 2005.

== Awards and honors ==
=== Grammy Awards ===
- 2011: 53rd Grammy Nominated for Best Jazz Vocal Album – Water - Gregory Porter
- 2012: 54th Grammy Nominated for Best Reggae Album – Harlem Kingston Express Live! – Monty Alexander
- 2012: 54th Grammy Nominated for Best Jazz Vocal – The Music of Randy Newman – Roseanna Vitro
- 2013: 55th Grammy Nominated for Best Traditional R&B Performance – Real Good Hands, from Be Good – Gregory Porter
- 2015: 57th Grammy Win for Best Latin Jazz Album – The Offense of the Drum – Arturo O'Farrill
- 2015: 57th Grammy Nominated for Best Jazz Vocal Album – I Wanna Be Evil – René Marie
- 2015: 57th Grammy Nominated for Best Instrumental Composition and Best Large Jazz Ensemble Album – Quiet Pride – The Elizabeth Catlett Project – Rufus Reid
- 2015: 57th Grammy Nominated for Best Latin Album – The Pedrito Martinez Group – Pedrito Martinez
- 2016: 58th Grammy Win for Best Instrumental Composition and Latin Grammy Best Latin Jazz/Jazz Album – Cuba: The Conversation Continues - Arturo O'Farrill
- 2016: 58th Grammy Nominated for Best Large Ensemble Jazz Album – Cuba: The Conversation Continues – Arturo O'Farrill
- 2016: 58th Grammy Nominated for Best Jazz Improvisation and Best Instrumental Jazz Album – My Favorite Things – Joey Alexander
- 2016: 58th Grammy Nominated for Best Jazz Vocal Album – Many A New Day – Karrin Allyson
- 2017: 59th Grammy Nominated for Best Improvised Jazz Solo – Countdown – Joey Alexander
- 2017: 59th Grammy Nominated for Best Jazz Vocal Album – Sound of Red – René Marie
- 2017: 59th Grammy Won Best Large Ensemble Jazz Album and Best Instrumental Composition – Presidential Suite: Eight Variations on Freedom – Ted Nash
- 2018: 60th Grammy Win for Best Instrumental Composition – Familia: Tribute to Bebo and Chico – Arturo O'Farrill and Chucho Valdes
- 2019: 61st Grammy Nomination Best Contemporary Instrumental Album – Beat Music! Beat Music! Beat Music! – Mark Guiliana
- 2019: 61st Grammy Nomination Best Instrumental Solo – La Madrina – Melissa Aldana

== Discography ==
=== 2001 ===
- Jana Herzen – Soup's on Fire

=== 2003 ===
- Babatunde Lea – Soul Pools
- Lynne Arriale – Arise

=== 2004 ===
- DJ Jackie Christie – Made 4 U

=== 2005 ===
- Babatunde Lea – Level of Intent
- Babatunde Lea – Suite Unseen: Summoner of the Ghost
- Lynn Arriale Trio (Jay Anderson, Steve Davis) – Come Together
- Bujo Kevin Jones – Tenth World

=== 2006 ===
- Marc Cary – Focus
- Lynne Arrialle Trio – Live

=== 2007 ===
- Marc Cary & Shon "Chance" Miller – XR Project: AbStraKt|BlaK
- Pete Levin – Deacon Blues
- Roni Ben-Hur – Keepin' It Open
- Rufus Reid – Live at the Kennedy Center
- Amy London – When I Look in Your Eyes
- Ryan Cohan – One Sky

=== 2008 ===
- Antonio Ciacca – Rush Life
- Bujo Kevin Jones – Bujo Kevin Jones & Tenth World Live!
- The New Jazz Composers Octet – The Turning Gate
- Roni Ben-Hur, Gene Bertoncini – Smile: Jazz Therapy, Volume 1

=== 2009 ===
- Charnett Moffett – The Art of Improvisation
- Lynne Arriale – Nuance: The Bennett Studio Sessions
- Sertab Erener, Demir Demirkan – Painted on Water
- Oran Etkin – Kelenia
- Tessa Souter – Obsession
- Babatunde Lea – Umbo Weti: A Tribute to Leon Thomas
- N.E.D. – No Evidence of Disease
- Alexis Cole – The Greatest Gift: Songs of the Season
- Ithamara Koorax, Juarez Moreira – Bim Bom: The Complete João Gilberto Songbook
- Roni Ben-Hur – Fortuna
- Antonio Ciacca Quintet – Lagos Blues

=== 2010 ===
- Geri Allen – Flying Toward the Sound
- Rufus Reid featuring Steve Allee & Duduka da Fonseca – Out Front
- Tomoko Sugawara – Along the Silk Road
- Marc Cary – Focus Trio Live 2009
- Gregory Porter – Water
- Patrick Stanfield Jones – A Heart and an Open Road
- Charnett Moffett – Treasure
- Geri Allen and Timeline – Live
- Oran Etkin – Wake Up Clarinet!
- Ryan Cohan – Another Look
- Sameer Gupta – Namaskar
- Bettina Jonic – The Bitter Mirror: Songs by Bob Dylan and Bertolt Brecht
- Randy Weston – The Storyteller

=== 2011 ===
- Lynne Arriale – Convergence
- Rondi Charleston – Who Knows Where the Time Goes
- Amy London – Let's Fly
- T.K. Blue – Latin Bird
- Rufus Reid & Out Front (Steve Allee & Duduka da Fonseca)
- René Marie – Voice of My Beautiful Country
- Malika Zarra – Berber Taxi
- Nilson Matta and Roni Ben-Hur with Victor Lewis and Café – Mojave - Jazz Therapy, Vol. 3
- Jean-Michel Pilc – Essential
- Roseanna Vitro – The Music of Randy Newman
- Monty Alexander – Harlem - Kingston Express Live!
- JC Stylles featuring Pat Bianchi and Lawrence Leathers – Exhilaration and Other States
- Geri Allen – A Child Is Born
- A Moving Sound – A Moving Sound
- Pilc Moutin Hoenig – Threedom
- David Murray Cuban Ensemble – Plays Nat King Cole en Español
- Pilc Moutin Hoenig – Threedom
- Gregory Porter – 1960 What? The Remixes
- Dennis Rollins Velocity Trio – The 11th Gate

=== 2012 ===
- Elio Villafranca, Arturo Stable – Dos y Mas
- Gregory Porter – Be Good
- Lynne Arriale – Solo
- Joe Locke / Geoffrey Keezer Group – Signing
- Ablaye Cissoko / Volker Goetze – Amanke Dionti
- Tessa Souter – Beyond The Blue
- Brazilian Trio – Constelação
- The Cookers – Believe
- Lakecia Benjamin – Retox
- Roni Ben-Hur, Santi Debriano – Our Thing
- Alexis Cole, Jeremy Kahn, Frank Basile, Kevin Bales, et al. – Joy Road: The Complete Works of Pepper Adams, Volumes 1-5

=== 2013 ===
- David Murray Infinity Quartet featuring Macy Gray & Gregory Porter – Be My Monster Love
- Marc Cary – For the Love of Abbey
- Geri Allen – Grand River Crossings
- 'The Joe Locke Quartet with Lincoln's Symphony Orchestra – Wish Upon A Star

=== 2014 ===
- Arturo O'Farrill & the Afro Latin Jazz Orchestra – The Offense of the Drum
- Ginger Baker – Why?
- Kellylee Evans – I Remember When
- Omer Avital – New Song
- Oran Etkin – Gathering Light
- The Cookers – Time and Time Again
- Brian Jackson & Kentyah Frazer – Evolutionary Minded, furthering the Legacy of Gil Scott-Heron

=== 2015 ===
- Joe Locke – Love Is A Pendulum
- Arturo O'Farrill & the Afro Latin Jazz Orchestra – Cuba: The Conversation Continues
- Shai Maestro Trio – Untold Stories

=== 2016 ===
- Jaimeo Brown Transcendence – Work Songs
- René Marie – Sound of Red
- Motema Compilations – The Same Heart (Original Motion Picture Soundtrack)
- David Murray, Gerri Allen, and Terri Lyne Carrington Power Trio – Perfection
- The Pedrito Martinez Group – Habana Dreams
- Ben Wendel – What We Bring
- Will Calhoun – Celebrating Elvin Jones
- Joey Alexander – Countdown
- Ted Nash – Presidential Suite: Eight Variations on Freedom
- Donny McCaslin – Beyond Now

=== 2017 ===
- Kneebody – Anti-Hero
- Petros Klampanis – Chroma
- Gerald Clayton – Tributary Tales
- Charnett Moffett – Music From Our Soul
- Jack DeJohnette, John Scofield, John Medeski, Larry Grenadier – Hudson
- Chucho Valdés and Arturo O'Farrill – Familiar: Tribute to Bebo and Chico
- Mark Guiliana – Jersey
- Joey Alexander – Joey.Monk.Live!
- Deva Mahal – EP

=== 2018 ===
- David Murray – Blues for Memo
- Deva Mahal – Run Deep
- Playing for Change – Listen to the Music
- Kneebody – How High feat. Inara George
- Joey Alexander – Eclipse
- Gilad Hekselman – Ask for Chaos
- Stefon Harris – Sonic Creed
- Donny McCaslin – Blow
- Ben Wendel – The Seasons
- Lori Henriques – Legion of Peace
- Joey Alexander – A Joey Alexander Christmas
- Nett Duo, Jana Herzen, Charnett Moffett – Overtones

=== 2019 ===
- Mark Guiliana – BEAT MUSIC! BEAT MUSIC! BEAT MUSIC!
- Melissa Aldana – Visions
- Gilad Hekselman – Further Chaos
- Charnett Moffett – Bright New Day
- Deva Mahal – Goddamn/Your Only One
- Donny McCaslin – Head of Mine/Tokyo
- Terri Lyne Carrington – Waiting Game

=== 2020 ===
- Jana Herzen – Nothing But Love
- Jana Herzen and Charnett Moffett – 'Round the World
- Jana Herzen – Kapolioka'ehukai
- The Royal Bopsters – Party of Four

=== 2021 ===
- Jana Herzen – Jana Herzen: LIVE
- Jihye Lee Orchestra – Daring Mind
- Charnett Moffett – New Love
- Charnett Moffett – Charnett Moffett Trio Live Feat. Jana Herzen

=== 2022 ===
- Jana Herzen – Over the Rainbow (Single)

=== 2023 ===
- Volker Goetze, Ali Boulo Santo Cissoko, Alejandro Moreno – Flamenkora
- Shuteen Erdenebaatar – Rising Sun
- Geri Allen and Kurt Rosenwinkel – A Lovesome Thing

=== 2024 ===
- Awa Sangho – MAMA!
- Jihye Lee Orchestra – Infinite Connections
- Stefon Harris and Blackout – Sonic Creed II: Life Signs
- Guy Klucevsek and Volker Goetze – Little Big Top

=== 2025 ===
- Ali Boulo Santo Cissoko and Volker Goetze – Sargal
- Shuteen Erdenebaatar and Nils Kugelmann – Under the Same Stars

=== 2026 ===
- Django Festival Allstars – Evolution
