= Plays Nat King Cole en Español =

2011 studio album by David Murray Cuban Ensemble

Studio album by David Murray Cuban Ensemble
- Released: October 11, 2011
- Recorded: June 26 & 27, 2010; Buenos Aires, Argentina
- Genre: Jazz
- Length: 75:20
- Label: Motéma; MTM 73
- Producer: Valerie Malot, David Murray

David Murray chronology
Rendezvous Suite (2009)	Plays Nat King Cole en Español (2011)	Be My Monster Love (2012)

Plays Nat King Cole en Español is an album by saxophonist David Murray's Cuban Ensemble with guest vocalist Daniel Melingo released on the Motéma label. The album was inspired by Nat King Cole's albums Cole Español (Capitol, 1958) and More Cole Español (Capitol, 1962).

== Reception ==
Professional ratings
Review scores
Source	Rating
AllMusic	4/5 stars
The Guardian	3/5 stars

The AllMusic review by Thom Jurek stated: "Plays Nat King Cole en Español is among the most imaginative and well-executed recordings in Murray's large catalog. He found something mercurial, graceful, and dignified in Cole's voice, and used it as inspiration to create a work that is respectful but utterly his own". The Guardian reviewer John Fordham awarded the album 3 stars, noting that "even by Murray's open standards, this is an unusual venture... It's a warm and very mellifluous album for Murray. These swaying songs glow with knowing life: the vivacious arrangements for strings and horns buoy up Murray's rich tenor sound, operating in a smoky Ben Websterish manner, without swamping it."

JazzTimes observed: "His charts, which feel Latin but aren’t idiomatically so, strip the original iterations of syrup and cheese, balancing Murray’s ebullient ensemble dissonances with keen attention to melody". On All About Jazz, James Nadal said: "Plays Nat King Cole en Español is wonderful music intended for dancing and romancing".

== Track listing ==
1. "El Bodeguero" (Richard Egües) – 9:20
2. "Quizás, Quizás, Quizás" (Osvaldo Farrés) – 6:07
3. "Tres Palabras" (Farrés) – 8:28
4. "Piel Canela" (Bobby Capó) – 7:11
5. "No Me Platiques" (Vicente Garrido) – 8:04
6. "Black Nat" (David Murray) – 6:43
7. "Cachito" (Consuelo Velázquez) – 6:44
8. "A Media Luz" (Carlos Cesar Lenzi, Edgardo Donato) – 6:23
9. "Aqui Se Habla En Amor" (Jack Keller, Noel Sherman) – 7:49
10. "El Choclo" (Ángel Villoldo) – 4:37
11. "Quizás, Quizás, Quizás" [Radio Edit] (Farrés) – 3:54

== Personnel ==
- David Murray – tenor saxophone, bass clarinet, conductor, arranger
- Daniel Melingo – vocals (tracks 2, 8, 10 & 11)
- Juanjo Mosalini – bandoneón (track 11)
- Roman Filiu Oreilly – alto saxophone
- Ariel Briguez Ruiz – tenor saxophone
- Mario Felix Hernandez Morrejon, Franck Mayea Pedroza – trumpet
- Denis Cuni Rodriguez – trombone
- Abraham Mansfarroll Rodriguez – congas
- Jose "Pepe" Rivero, Reiner Elizarde Ruano – bass

Sinfonieta of Sines coordinated by Jose Avelino Castro Pinto

- Rui Guimaraes, Joana Cipriano, Joao Andrade, Joana Dias, Maria Jose Laginha – violin
- Joao Gaspar, Goncalo Ruivo – viola
- Tiago Vila, Catarina Anacleto, Rita Ramos, Samual Santos – cello
