= Joey Alexander =

Indonesian jazz pianist (born 2003)

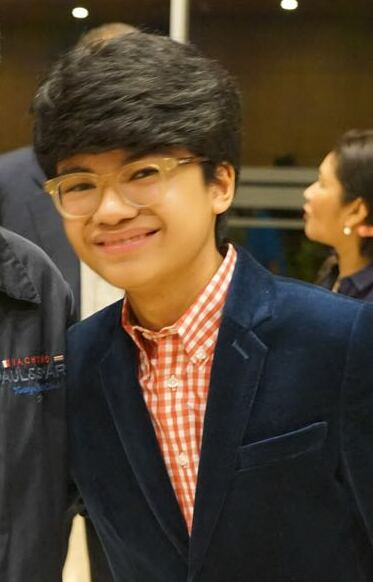
- Alexander in 2017

Background information
- Born: Josiah Alexander Sila; 25 June 2003 (age 23); Denpasar, Bali, Indonesia
- Genre: Jazz
- Occupation: Musician
- Instrument: Piano
- Years active: 2012–present
- Labels: Motéma, Verve, Mack Avenue Records
- Website: joeyalexandermusic.today

Josiah Alexander Sila (born in Denpasar, Bali, Indonesia on 25 June 2003), known professionally as Joey Alexander, is an Indonesian jazz pianist. He became the first Indonesian musician ever to be nominated at the american Grammy Awards and performed at the ceremony as well. His debut album My Favorite Things peaked at #59 on the Billboard 200.

Widely regarded as a Wunderkind, Alexander was mentored in jazz piano by his father. He won the Grand Prix at the 2013 Master-Jam Fest when he was nine.

In 2014, Wynton Marsalis invited him to play at Jazz at Lincoln Center. His first album, My Favorite Things, was released in 2015 when he was 11 years old. Alexander played at the Montreal and Newport Jazz Festivals in 2015 and has performed for Herbie Hancock, Bill Clinton, Wendy Kiess, and Barack Obama.

== Early life ==
Alexander was born in Denpasar, Bali, Indonesia, to parents Denny Sila and Farah Leonora Urbach, who ran an adventure tourism business. His father was an amateur musician, and both parents were fans of jazz, particularly Louis Armstrong. He is the nephew of rock singer Nafa Urbach and Indonesian musician and songwriter Alam Urbach. He learned about jazz by listening to classic albums his father gave him. By age six, he had taught himself to play piano using a miniature electric keyboard his father brought home for him, learning by ear compositions such as Thelonious Monk's "Well, You Needn't" and other songs from his father's collection. He later said learning the instrument came naturally to him, and considers his ability "a gift from God". He cites as influences John Coltrane, Harry Connick Jr., Bill Evans, and Herbie Hancock, and he particularly admires Clifford Brown, Miles Davis, Wynton Marsalis, Brad Mehldau, Lee Morgan, Horace Silver and McCoy Tyner.

Due to the unavailability of jazz education in his hometown, Alexander participated in jam sessions in Bali and Jakarta, where his family moved after disbanding their tourism business so he could live near Indonesia's top jazz musicians. When he was eight, he played for Herbie Hancock when Hancock was visiting Jakarta as a UNESCO goodwill ambassador. Hancock told Alexander that he believed in him, and Alexander later called that time "the day I decided to dedicate my childhood to jazz". At the age of nine, he won the Grand Prix at the 2013 Master-Jam Fest, an all-ages jazz competition in Odesa, Ukraine, which included 43 musicians from 17 nations. In 2014, he and his family moved to New York City to pursue a career in music.

== Career ==
Jazz trumpeter Wynton Marsalis, artistic director of Jazz at Lincoln Center, learned about Alexander after a friend suggested he watch a YouTube video clip of him playing compositions by Coltrane, Monk and Chick Corea. Marsalis praised Alexander as "my hero" on his Facebook page, and invited him to appear at his organization's gala in May 2014, when he was 10. It marked Alexander's United States debut. He received positive reviews for his performance, particularly for his solo version of the Monk song "'Round Midnight". The New York Times said he became an "overnight sensation" after the performance. Allen Morrison of DownBeat magazine said of the performance: "If the word 'genius' still means anything, it applies to this prodigy. He played his own solo variations on 'Round Midnight' with a breathtaking precocity and mastery of several decades of piano style." Marsalis said of him: "There has never been anyone that you can think of who could play like that at his age. I loved everything about his playing—his rhythm, his confidence, his understanding of the music." Jeanne Moutoussamy-Ashe, widow of tennis player Arthur Ashe, invited Alexander to perform at the Arthur Ashe Learning Center gala, where he played for a crowd that included former U.S. President Bill Clinton. Moutoussamy-Ashe introduced him to Gordon Uehling III, founder of the CourtSense Tennis Training Center, who allowed Alexander and his family to stay at his estate in Alpine, New Jersey.

Alexander played at A Great Night in Harlem at the Apollo Theater, a performance honoring Herbie Hancock. His performance at the University of the District of Columbia garnered viral attention on the internet, drawing more than 500,000 views on Facebook. He also played in a concert with students of the Juilliard School, the proceeds of which funded his continuing stay in New York City. The concert, which received national media attention on NBC News, was successful enough for him to obtain an O-1B visa, which is granted to "individuals with extraordinary ability". He also gave concert performances in 2014 at the Copenhagen Jazz Festival and the International Java Jazz Festival in Jakarta.

Alexander's debut album, My Favorite Things, was released on 12 May 2015, on the Harlem-based label Motéma Music and produced by Jason Olaine. He was 11 at the time of its release. He began recording the album in October 2014. He arranged all of its songs, which includes renditions of "'Round Midnight", Coltrane's "Giant Steps" and Billy Strayhorn's "Lush Life". It also includes an original composition, "Ma Blues", which was inspired by Bobby Timmons's "Moanin'". My Favorite Things featured Alexander alongside Russell Hall, Alphonso Horne and Sammy Miller, as well as guest performers Larry Grenadier and Ulysses Owens. He had several performances in 2015, including one at the Montreal International Jazz Festival, and another at the Newport Jazz Festival in August. Newport producer George Wein is reluctant to sign alleged child prodigies, but made an exception after Moutoussamy-Ashe took Alexander to Wein's Manhattan apartment to play for him. Wein said he distinguished himself with "the maturity of his harmonic approach". Jazz at Lincoln Center has expressed interest in incorporating Alexander into its educational outreach efforts, hoping to encourage young people to listen to jazz music.

At the beginning of February in 2016, Alexander was a runner-up through his nomination for the Best Jazz Instrumental Album for My Favorite Things at 58th Annual Grammy Awards and as well for Best Improvised Jazz Solo for Giant Steps. He performed live at the Premiere Ceremony, the pre-telecast ceremony at the same Grammy Awards.

In September 2016, Alexander released his second album, Countdown (Motéma Music, 2016), named after the John Coltrane track. It featured his trio of Dan Chmielinski and Ulysses Owens, augmented by bassist Larry Grenadier and saxophonist Chris Potter. On 28 April 2017, Alexander made his debut appearance at the New Orleans Jazz and Heritage Festival.

At the 59th Annual Grammy Awards, Alexander was again nominated in 2017 for Best Improvised Jazz Solo for Countdown.

September 2017 saw the release of Alexander's third album, titled Joey. Monk. Live! (Motéma Music, 2017), is a collection of seven songs by Thelonious Monk recorded live at Jazz at Lincoln Center's Appel Room in June 2017, released concurrently with his nomination as Music Scholar by the T. Washington Scholars program in August. His fourth album, titled Eclipse (Motéma Music, 2018), was released in May 2018.

On 18 August 2018, Alexander performed at the opening ceremony of the 2018 Asian Games in Jakarta, Indonesia.

In 2020, Alexander released Warna, his fifth album under Verve Records. His sixth album, Origin, was released on 20 May 2022 by Mack Avenue. It is Alexander's first album of entirely original compositions. Past collaborators Kendrick Scott and Larry Grenadier return, with featured musicians Gilad Hekselman and Chris Potter.

At May 17, 2024, Joey Alexander performed as a new Trio at the Fondation Louis Vuitton in Paris with Kris Funn on double bass and Jonathan Barber on drums. This concert was part of its Piano Jazz Sessions on his Tour. The performance highlighted tracks from his seventh album, Continuance, which was released in November 2023 by Mack Avenue Records. The concert was professionally recorded and broadcast on the music channel Mezzo TV.

== Discography ==
=== As leader ===
- My Favorite Things (Motéma, 2015)
- Countdown (Motéma, 2016)
- Joey.Monk.Live! (Motéma, 2017)
- Eclipse (Motéma, 2018)
- Warna (Verve, 2020)
- Origin (Mack Avenue, 2022)
- Continuance (Mack Avenue, 2023)
- Celestial Keeper (Mack Avenue, 2026)

== Awards and nominations ==
Grammy Awards

Year	Category	Work	Result
2016	Best Improvised Jazz Solo	"Giant Steps"	Nominated
2016	Best Jazz Instrumental Album	My Favorite Things	Nominated
2017	Best Improvised Jazz Solo	"Countdown"	Nominated

Panasonic Gobel Awards

Year	Category	Work	Result
2016	Special Events	"Special Interview Joey Alexander with Najwa Shihab"	Nominated

Anugerah Musik Indonesia

Year	Category	Work	Result
2018	Best Jazz Instrumental Artist	"Moment's Notice"	Won

Libera Awards

Year	Category	Work	Result
2024	Best Jazz Records	Continuance	Nominated
