= Ablaye Cissoko =

Senegalese musician, singer and composer

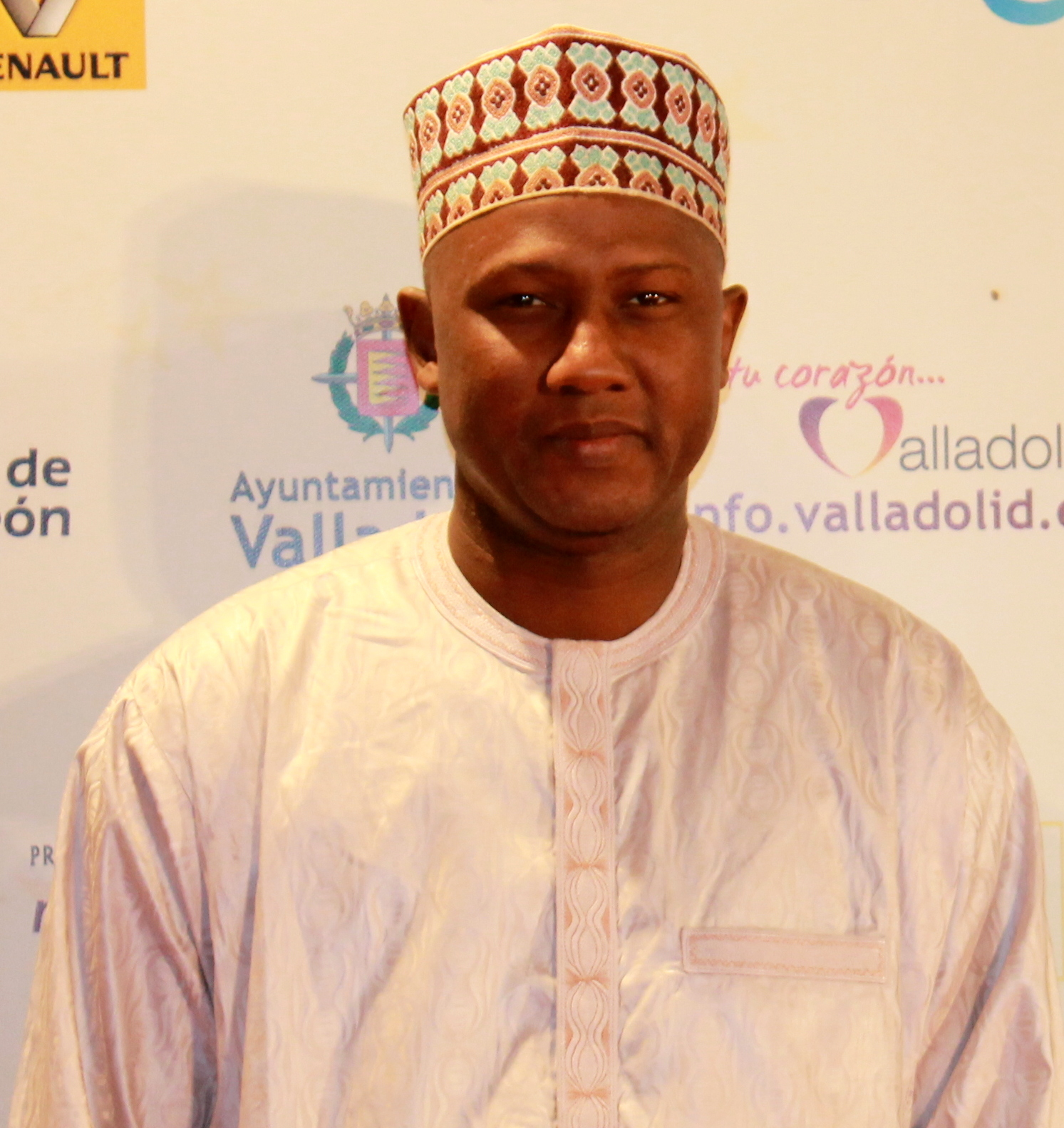
- Ablaye Cissoko at the 2012 Seminci

Background information
- Born: 1970 (age 55–56); Kolda, Senegal
- Genres: World, world fusion
- Occupations: Musician, singer, composer
- Instrument: Kora
- Years active: 1982–present
- Labels: ObliqSound, Motéma Music
- Website: ablaye-cissoko.com

Ablaye Cissoko is a Senegalese musician, singer and composer, who plays the kora.

== Career ==
As a solo musician, he has played live shows in several countries, including Portugal, France, Belgium, Senegal, Mali, Canada, Germany, Norway and Russia. He has collaborated extensively with trumpeter Volker Goetze and they have released three albums as a duo: Sira in 2008, Amanké Dionti in 2012 and Djaliya in 2014. Sira entered the top 10 world music radio chart on CMJ in January 2009.

Another collaboration with the Constantinople ensemble playing traditional Persian music resulted in the albums Jardins migrateurs (2012) and Traversées (2019).

== Film ==
A 2011 feature-length documentary, Griot, directed by Volker Goetze, follows Cissoko, who is determined to preserve his thousand-year-old kora tradition. In the documentary Cissoko has a dream to have a thriving cultural centre where children can come to learn the traditions of their forefathers.

== Discography ==
Solo

- 2003: Diam (Ma Case / L'autre distribution)
- 2005: Le Griot Rouge (Ma Case / L'autre distribution)
- 2011: Saint Louis
- 2013: Mes Racines
- 2014: Popenguine (Soundtrack to the documentary Popenguine)

with Volker Goetze

- 2008: Sira (ObliqSound)
- 2012: Amanké Dionti (Motéma)
- 2014: Djaliya

with Constantinople

- 2015: Jardins Migrateurs
- 2019: Traversées
- 2025: Estuaire

with Cyrille Brotto

- 2022: Instant
- 2025: Djiyo

with Majid Bekkas

- 2011: Mabrouk (Bee Jazz)

with Simon Goubert

- 2012: African Jazz Roots (Cristal)
- 2017: Au Loin

with Mishaa

- 2013: Kano Mbifé II (Mes Racines remixes and bonus songs)
