= My Favorite Things (Joey Alexander album) =

Studio album by Joey Alexander
- Released: May 12, 2015
- Recorded: October 2014
- Studio: Avatar Studio, NYC
- Genre: Jazz
- Label: Motéma
- Producer: Jason Olaine

Joey Alexander chronology
My Favorite Things (2015)	Countdown (2016)

My Favorite Things is the first album by the jazz pianist Joey Alexander. Released in 2015, it earned Alexander a Grammy Award nomination for Best Jazz Instrumental Album.

== Track listing ==
Standard edition
No.	Title	Writer(s)	Length
1.	"Giant Steps"	John Coltrane	10:15
2.	"Lush Life"	Billy Strayhorn	8:13
3.	"My Favorite Things"	Richard Rodgers; Oscar Hammerstein II	6:16
4.	"It Might as Well Be Spring"	Rodgers; Hammerstein II	5:28
5.	"Ma Blues"	Joey Alexander	6:51
6.	"'Round Midnight"	Thelonious Monk; Cootie Williams; Bernie Hanighen	6:50
7.	"I Mean You"	Monk; Coleman Hawkins	4:15
8.	"Tour De Force"	Dizzy Gillespie	5:50
9.	"Over the Rainbow"	Harold Arlen; E.Y. "Yip" Harburg	4:32

Deluxe edition bonus tracks
No.	Title	Length
10.	"Footprints"	8:53
11.	"Green Dolphin Street"	3:13

== Personnel ==
=== Musicians ===
- Joey Alexander – piano, arrangements
- Larry Grenadier – bass (tracks 1–4)
- Russell Hall – bass (tracks 5, 7–8)
- Ulysses Owens Jr – drums (tracks 1,2,4)
- Sammy Miller – drums (tracks 5,7–8)
- Alphonso Horne – trumpet (track 8)

=== Production ===
- Produced by Jason Olaine
- Executive Producer: Jana Herzen
- Recorded by Katherine Miller at Avatar Studio, NYC
- Assistant Engineer: Nathan Odden
- Mixed by Katherine Miller (Amnondale Recording)
- Mastered by Alan Silverman: (Arf Mastering, NYC)
- Illustration: James Gulliver Hancock
- Photography/Design: Rebecca Meek

== Charts ==
Chart (2016)	Peak position
US Billboard 200	59
US Top Jazz Albums (Billboard)	1
US Top Album Sales (Billboard)	26
US Independent Albums (Billboard)	1
US Heatseekers Albums (Billboard)	4
