= Antonio Ciacca =

Dr. Antonio Ciacca
- Born: Germany
- Genres: Jazz
- Occupation: Musician
- Instrument: Piano
- Label: Motéma

Antonio Ciacca is a German-born jazz pianist.

== Early life ==
Ciacca was born in Germany and brought up in Italy. He began playing the piano at the age of seven. He has been taught by Steve Grossman, [Jaki Byard], [Bruce Barth] and Barry Harris.

== Later life and career ==
Ciacca toured Europe with the Larry Smith Quartet in 1995 and 1996, played in Japan with the Eiji Nakayama Quartet in 1998, and toured Europe with Wes Anderson and Steve Lacy in 1999. Ciacca studied further with Jaki Byard in 1998–99, and dedicated the album Hollis Avenue to him. Ciacca founded the Detroit Gospel Singers, and toured Europe with them in 2000. He earned his undergraduate Diploma at the "G.B. Martini" Conservatory tin Bologna, Italy.. He became Director of Programming at Jazz at Lincoln Center in 2007, resigning in 2011. Dr. Ciacca earned his master's degree in jazz studies at City College in New York City and his DMA (Doctor of Musica Arts) at Stony Brook University. Dr. Ciacca is currently adjunct professor of Jazz History at Marymount Manhattan College, and Professor of Jazz arranging and COmposition at the "G. Nicolini" conservatory in Piacenza, Italy.

== Musical style ==
The DownBeat reviewer of the album Lagos Blues wrote: "Ciacca is informed by a broad range of influences. Two are particularly obvious, those being hard bop and Duke Ellington."

== Discography ==
=== As leader ===
Year recorded	Title	Label	Notes
1997?	Driemoty	C-Jam	
1998?	Hollis Avenue	Yvp	
2002?	Autumn in New York	Splash	
2004?	Live in Mosciano S.Angelo Featuring Benny Golson		
2005?	Ugly Beauty	Soul Note	
2008?	Rush Life	Motéma	Quintet, with Joe Magnarelli (trumpet), Stacy Dillard (tenor sax), Kengo Nakamura (bass), Rodney Green (drums)
2010?	Lagos Blues	Motéma	Quintet, with Stacy Dillard and Steve Grossman (tenor sax), Kengo Nakamura (bass), Ulysses Owens (drums)
2013?	Just In Time, Antonio Ciacca introducing Justin Echols	TwinsMusic	
2014?	With a Song In My Heart	TwinsMusic	
2016?	Volare, The Italian American Songbook	Cellarlive	

=== As sideman ===
- Larry Smith & Co Live at the Slovak Phihlarmonic (1996)
- Larry Smith Quartet Estate (1998)
- Detroit Gospel Singers Gospel Jubilee (2000)
- Craig Bailey Sextet Brooklyn (2001)
- Detroit Gospel Singers "Gospel Jubilee" Alma Records (2001)
- Various Artists Gubbio No Border Festival (2004)
- Dario Mazzucco Light Lunch (2008)
- Lucio Ferrara Quintet Featuring Lee Konitz & Antonio Ciacca It's All Right with Me (2009)
- Stefania Tchantret Quintet Love For Sale (2010)
- Sweet Lu Olutosin "Sweet Lu's Blues" TwinsMusic Records (2014)
- Debora Tamagnini with the Antonio Ciacca quartet "Camellia" Beat Sound (2016)
- Mara De Mutiis with the Antonio Ciacca Quintet "The men I love" Dodicilune Records (2016)
- Antonio Belladelli with the Antonio Ciacca Quartet "Save Your Love for Me" Jazz3 (2016)
- Francesco Alemanno Quintet, "The Nearness of You" Dodicilune records (2017)
- Antonio Belladelli with The Antonio Ciacca Hammond Trio "It Might Be Swing... 'round Midnight" Jazz3 (2017)
- Jamile Saevie Ayres, "If you could see me now" (2019)
