= Love Is a Pendulum =

Studio album by Joe Locke
- Released: May 26, 2015
- Recorded: April 13–14, 2014
- Studio: Avatar Studios
- Genre: Jazz
- Length: 66:10
- Label: Motéma

Love Is a Pendulum is an album released by American jazz vibraphonist Joe Locke in 2015 on the Motéma label. The album is centered on the five-movement suite of the same name, which Locke was inspired to write after reading a poem by Barbara Sfraga.

== Track listing ==
No.	Title	Writer(s)	Length
1.	"Variation On Wisdom"	Locke	2:09
2.	"Love Is The Tide"	Locke	11:37
3.	"Love Is A Planchette"	Locke	7:55
4.	"Love Is A Pendulum"	Locke	8:45
5.	"Love Is Letting Go"	Locke	4:52
6.	"Love Is Perpetual Motion"	Locke	10:38
7.	"For Jessie Mountain"	Locke	5:45
8.	"Last Ditch Wisdom"	Locke	6:44
9.	"Embrace"	Locke	7:45

== Personnel ==
- Joe Locke – vibraphone, producer
- Robert Rodriguez – piano
- Ricky Rodriguez – double bass, bass guitar
- Terreon Gully – drums, producer

Guests

- Donny McCaslin – tenor saxophone
- Rosario Giuliani – alto saxophone, soprano saxophone
- Paul Bollenback – guitar
- Victor Provost – steel pan
- Theo Bleckmann – vocals
