= One Sky =

Studio album by Ryan Cohan
- Released: October 16, 2007
- Genre: Jazz
- Length: 68:47
- Label: Motéma Music

Ryan Cohan chronology
Here and Now (2001)	One Sky (2007)

Professional ratings
Review scores
Source	Rating
Allmusic	link
Albany Jazz	Top 5 Albums of 2008 link

One Sky is a jazz album composed by Ryan Cohan, performed by the RC Sextet and released 16 October 2007 on Motéma Music.

The album's name comes from the concept that all of humanity lives under one sky and that, therefore, man cannot operate as a solitary creature. The cover art is a photo taken by Ryan Cohan.

The Ryan Cohan Sextet received a grant from Chamber Music America to compose the suite "One Sky: Tone Poems for Humanity," which makes up the second half of the album.

== Track listing ==
All songs written by Ryan Cohan, except where noted.

1. "Double Agent" – 7:36
2. "Easy For You To Say" – 7:57
3. "Six Fortunes" – 7:07
4. "Checkmate" – 7:50
5. "Lush Life" (Strayhorn) – 7:29
6. "I. Into Being, Pt. 1" – 2:31
7. "I. Into Being, Pt. 2" – 7:18
8. "II. Wonder & Response" – 6:51
9. "III. Awe" – 4:47
10. "IV. Hope" – 9:21

== Personnel ==
Ryan Cohan Sextet

- Ryan Cohan – piano
- Bob Sheppard – tenor & soprano saxophones, flute
- Geof Bradfield – tenor & soprano saxophones, bass clarinet
- Tito Carillo – trumpet, flugelhorn
- James Cammack – double bass
- Lorin Cohen – double bass
- Kobie Watkins – drums

Additional personnel

- Jea Christophe-Leroy – percussion
- Ruben Alvarez – shekere
