= Shai Maestro =

Israeli jazz pianist (born 1987)

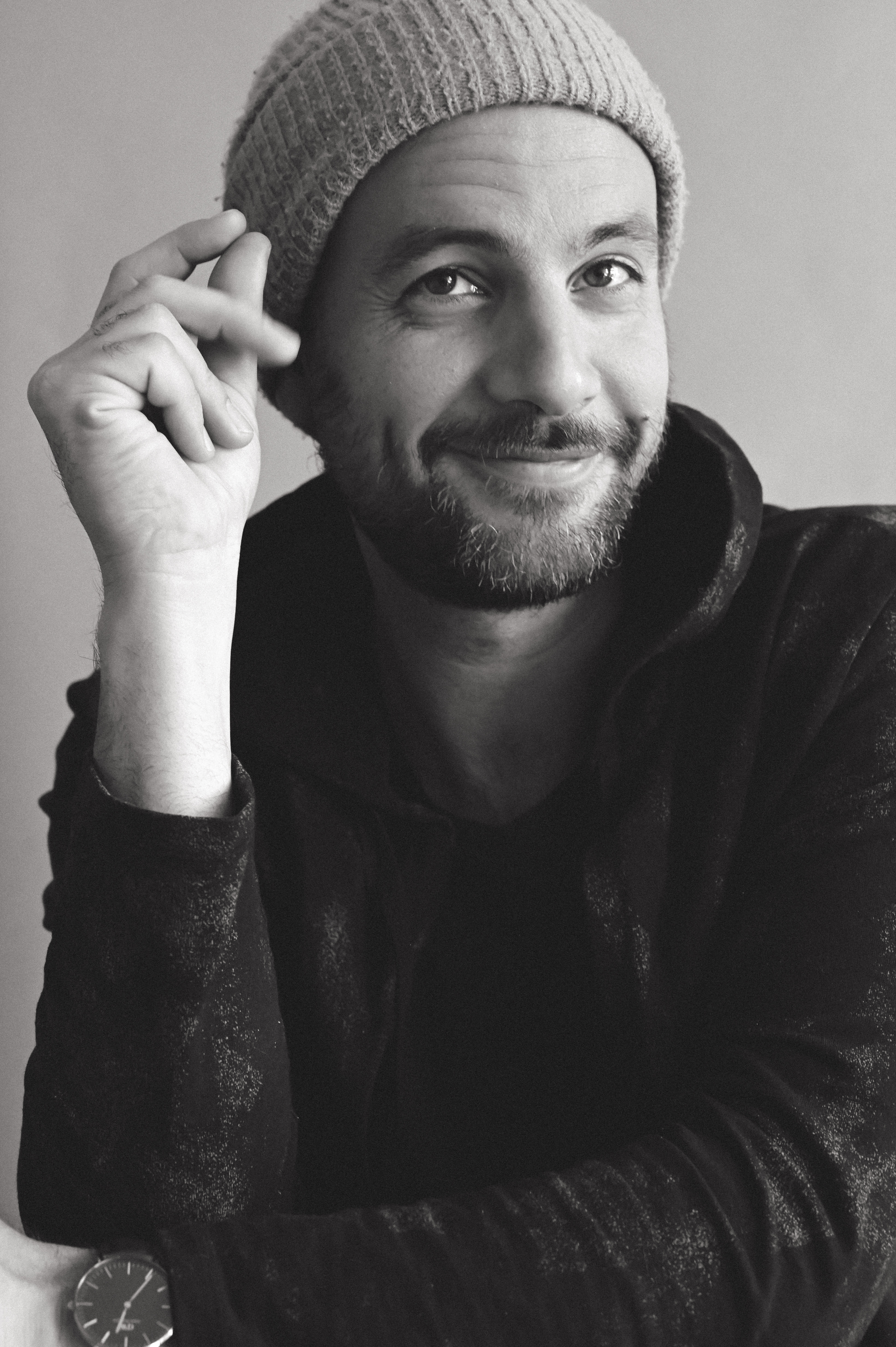

Background information
- Born: 5 February 1987 (age 39)
- Origin: Israel
- Genre: Jazz
- Occupations: Musician, composer, bandleader
- Instrument: Piano
- Labels: ECM, Sound Surveyor, Laborie
- Website: shaimaestro.com

Shai Maestro (Hebrew: שי מאסטרו; /ʃaɪ ˈmaɪ.stroʊ/ SHY MY-stroh; born 5 February 1987) is an Israeli jazz pianist.

== Early life ==
Maestro started exploring music at the age of five, initially exploring classical piano.

He graduated from the Thelma Yellin High School of Performing Arts in Givataim, Israel. Notably, he won the National Jazz Ensembles Competition Jazz Signs in 2002 and 2003 and received scholarships (2004 to 2010) from the America-Israel Cultural Fund for jazz piano.

== Career ==
While attending the Berklee College of Music's Five-Week Summer Performance Program in Boston, Shai Maestro earned a scholarship but opted not to pursue the subsequent offer to attend Berklee. Shortly thereafter, bassist Avishai Cohen invited him to join his trio alongside drummer Mark Guiliana. Maestro contributed to four albums with the Avishai Cohen Trio, including two for Blue Note: Gently Disturbed (2008), Sensitive Hours (2008), Aurora (2009), and Seven Seas (2011), touring with the trio during this period.

In July 2010, Maestro formed his own trio and recorded Shai Maestro Trio for the French label Laborie Jazz. The trio then toured globally, averaging 80 concerts annually and sharing stages with groups led by Chick Corea, Tigran Hamasyan, Esperanza Spalding, and Diana Krall.

In 2012, the trio released their second album, The Road to Ithaca, through Laborie Jazz. This was succeeded by Untold Stories (2015) and The Stone Skipper (2016). These albums received acclaim from DownBeat magazine, The Guardian, NPR, and WBGO's The Checkout.

Maestro recorded The Dream Thief (ECM) in April 2018, featuring Ofri Nehemya on drums and Jorge Roeder on bass. The recording took place at Lugano's Auditorio Stelio Molo RSI and was produced by Manfred Eicher. Apart from his trio work, Maestro contributed to an album with vocalist Theo Bleckmann. In 2021, Maestro released the album Human (ECM). All About Jazz gave it a favorable review and mentioned the camaraderie present in the album. He also collaborated with artists such as Philip Dizack, Jorge Roeder, and Ofri Nehemya.

Maestro has also served as a sideman alongside notable musicians like sax player Ben Wendel and drummer Mark Guiliana, and engaged in collaborations with various artists, including vocalist Michael Mayo. He has performed in major jazz festivals worldwide, such as Jarasum Jazz in Korea, Bimhuis or North Sea Jazz in The Netherlands and Winter Jazz in New York City, US.

In 2025, Shai Maestro released his first piano solo album, called Solo Miniatures and Tales (Naïve) .

== Discography ==
=== As leader ===
Year recorded	Year released	Title	Label	Notes
2012	2012	Shai Maestro Trio	Laborie	Trio, with Jorge Roeder (bass), Ziv Ravitz (drums)
2013		The Road to Ithaca	Laborie	Trio
	2015	Untold Stories	Motema	Trio, with Jorge Roeder (bass), Ziv Ravitz (drums)
	2016	The Stone Skipper	Sound Surveyor	Most tracks trio, with Jorge Roeder (bass), Ziv Ravitz (drums); some tracks with guests: Gretchen Parlato, Neli Andreeva, Kalnina Andreeva, Theo Bleckmann, Mika Ravitz (vocals)
2018	2018	The Dream Thief	ECM	Trio, with Jorge Roeder (bass), Ofri Nehemya (drums)
2020	2021	Human	ECM	Quartet, with Philip Dizack (trumpet), Jorge Roeder (bass), Ofri Nehemya (drums)
2025	2025	Solo Miniatures and Tales	Naïve	Solo

=== As sideman ===
- Gently Disturbed – Avishai Cohen (2008)
- Aurora – Avishai Cohen (2009)
- Seven Seas – Avishai Cohen (2011)
- Like a Great River – Oded Tzur (2015)
- Traces – Camila Meza (2016)
- Elegy – Theo Bleckmann (2017)
- True Listener – Bálint Gyémánt (2017)
- Translator's Note – Oded Tzur (2017)
- Roads Diverge – Noam Wiesenberg (2018)
- NY Standard – Ari Hoenig (2018)
- High Heart – Ben Wendel (2020)
- Fly – Michael Mayo (2024)
