= Solo (Lynne Arriale album) =

Recording by Lynne Arriale
- Released: 2012
- Recorded: October 2, 2011
- Venue: HCC Ybor Performing Arts Center
- Genre: Jazz
- Length: 52:24
- Label: Motéma

Solo is a solo piano album by Lynne Arriale. It was recorded in 2011 and released by Motéma Music.

== Recording and music ==
The album of solo piano performances by Lynne Arriale was recorded at the HCC Ybor Performing Arts Center on October 2, 2011. The material is a mix of standards and Arriale originals.

== Release and reception ==
Professional ratings
Review scores
Source	Rating
AllMusic	4/5 stars
The Guardian	3/5 stars

Solo was released by Motéma Music in 2012. The JazzTimes reviewer concluded: "Arriale proves as comfortable in a solo setting as she's been in the company of others". The AllMusic reviewer wrote: "This solo outing will likely become one of the landmark recordings of her career." Critic John Fordham in The Guardian wrote that "The accents in Arialle's swing don't always sound nailed [...] but her harmonic and melodic resources have rarely sounded in more inventive fettle."

== Track listing ==
1. "La Noche" – 3:46
2. "The Dove" – 4:06
3. "Evidence " – 3:56
4. "Wouldn't It Be Loverly" – 5:48
5. "Will o' the Wisp" – 4:38
6. "Yada, Yada, Yada" – 3:32
7. "Arise" – 5:04
8. "Dance" – 4:31
9. "What Is This Thing Called Love" – 3:09
10. "Sea and Sand" – 3:54
11. "Bye-Ya" – 4:51
12. "And So It Goes" – 4:25

== Personnel ==
- Lynne Arriale – piano
