= Lynne Arriale =

American jazz pianist, composer, bandleader and educator

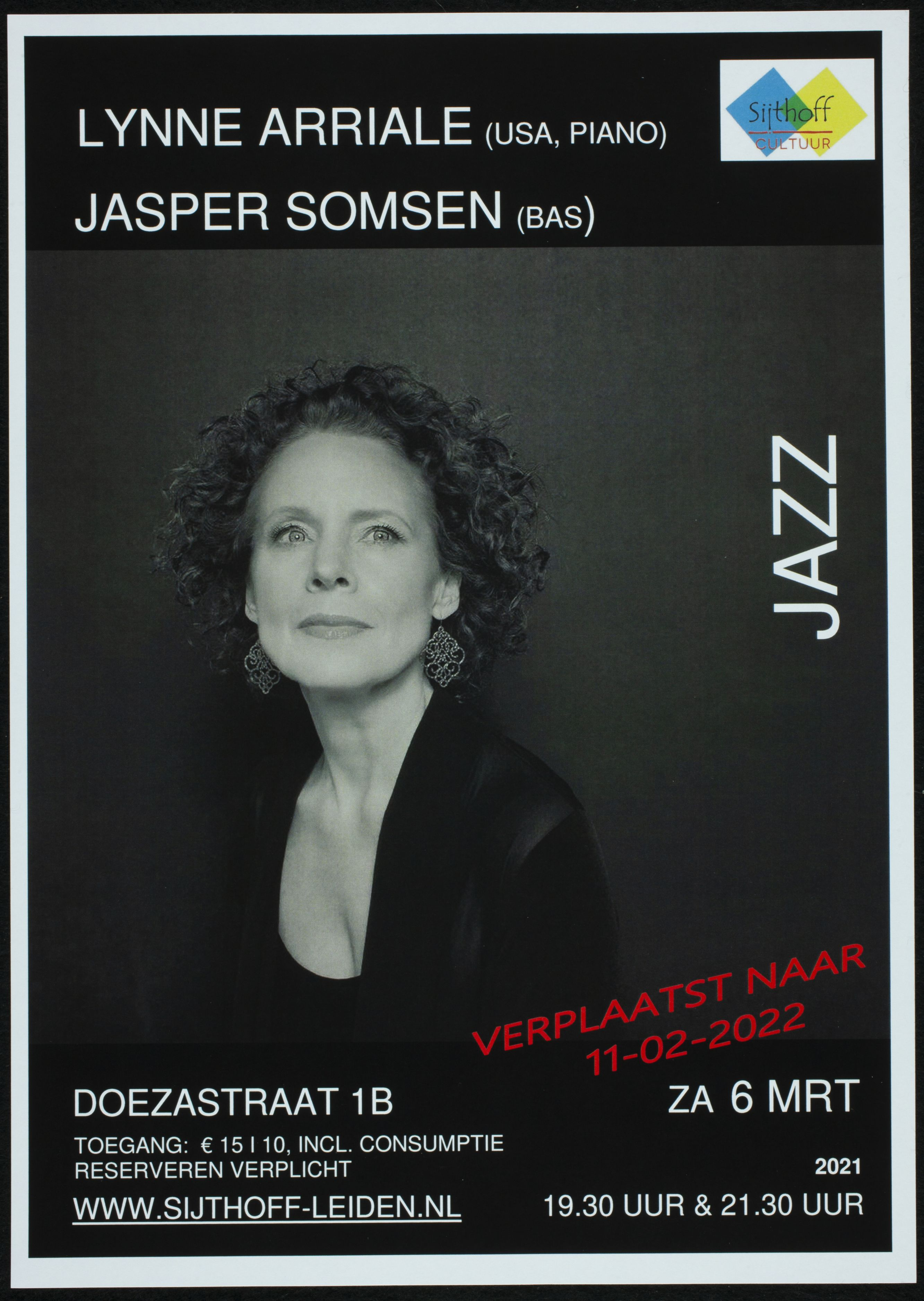
Lynne Arriale

Lynne Arriale is an American jazz pianist, composer, bandleader and educator. She is Professor of Jazz Studies and Director of Small Ensembles at the University of North Florida.

== Awards and honors ==
- "The Lights Are Always On" (2022) #3 on JazzWeek Radio charts
- "The Lights Are Always On" (2022) #19 on JazzWeek Radio charts, CDs receiving the most airplay in 2020
- "Chimes of Freedom" (2020) #8 on JazzWeek Radio charts
- "Chimes of Freedom"(2020) #34 on JazzWeek Radio charts, CDs receiving the most airplay in 2020
- "Give Us These Days" (2018) #15 on JazzWeek Radio charts
- "Solo" (2012) #28 JazzWeek Radio charts
- "Convergence" (2011) #4 on JazzWeek Radio charts
- "Convergence" (2011) Top 50 CDs of 2011, JazzTimes
- "Nuance" (2008) #4 on JazzWeek Radio charts
- "Lynne Arriale Trio Live" (2005) #17 on JazzWeek Radio charts
- "Come Together" (2003) #3 on JazzWeek Radio charts
- "Arise"(2002) #1 on JazzWeek Radio charts
- First place, The Great American Jazz Piano Competition (1993)

== Discography ==
An asterisk (*) indicates that the year is that of release.

=== As leader ===
Year recorded	Title	Label	Personnel/Notes
1994*	The Eyes Have It	DMP	Trio, with Jay Anderson (bass), Steve Davis (drums)
1995*	When You Listen	DMP	Trio, with Drew Gress (bass), Steve Davis (drums)
1996*	With Words Unspoken	DMP	Trio, with Drew Gress (bass), Steve Davis (drums)
1997*	A Long Road Home	TCB	Trio, with John Patitucci (bass), Steve Davis (drums)
1998*	Melody	TCB	Trio, with Scott Colley (bass), Steve Davis (drums)
1999*	Live at Montreux	TCB	Trio, with Jay Anderson (bass), Steve Davis (drums); in concert
2000*	Inspiration	TCB	Trio, with Jay Anderson (bass), Steve Davis (drums)
2002*	Arise	Motéma	Trio, with Jay Anderson (bass), Steve Davis (drums)
2004*	Come Together	Motéma	Trio, with Jay Anderson (bass), Steve Davis (drums)
2005*	Live	Motéma	Trio, with Jay Anderson (bass), Steve Davis (drums); in concert
2008*	Nuance	Motéma	Quartet, with Randy Brecker (trumpet, flugelhorn), George Mraz (bass), Anthony Pinciotti (drums)
2011*	Convergence	Motéma	Some tracks trio, with Omer Avital (bass), Anthony Pinciotti (drums); some tracks quartet, with Bill McHenry (tenor sax) added
2011	Solo	Motéma	Solo piano
2018*	Give Us These Days	Challenge	Trio, with Jasper Somsen (bass), Jasper van Hulten (drums); some tracks quartet, with Kate McGarry added
2020*	Chimes of Freedom	Challenge	Trio, with Jasper Somsen (bass), E.J.Strickland (drums); some tracks quartet, with K.J. Denhert (vocals)
2022*	The Lights Are Always On	Challenge	Trio, with Jasper Somsen (bass), E.J.Strickland (drums)

=== As guest ===
- 1998 Pat Harbison Quartet, After All
- 1999 Wolfgand Lackerschmid Quartet (TCB)
- 2002 Rachel Caswell, Some Other Time
- 2005 Sara Caswell, But Beautiful (Arbors)
- 2009 Rondi Charleston Who Knows Where the Time Goes (Motéma)
