= Volker Goetze =

German composer, trumpeter and filmmaker

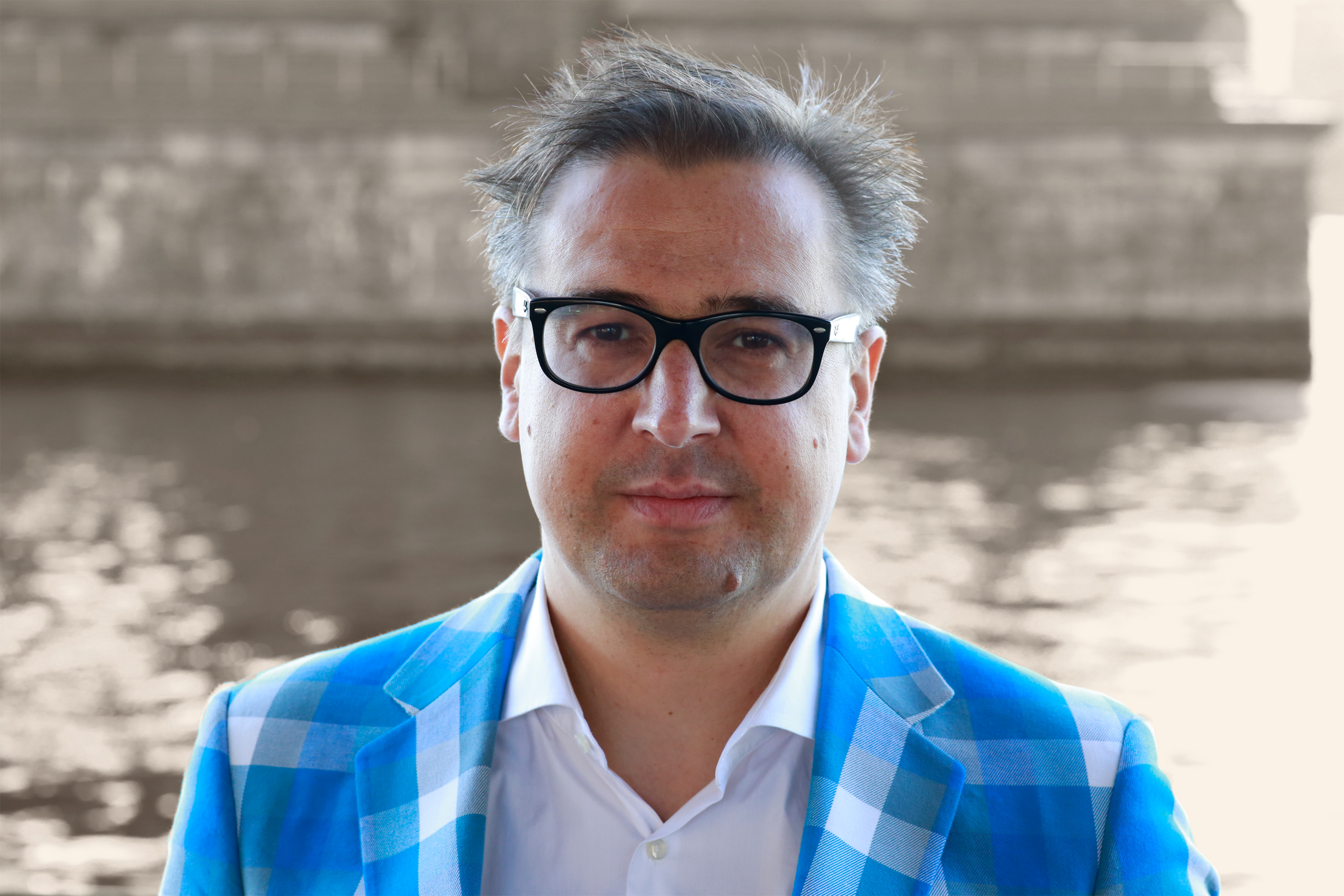
Volker Goetze Headshot

Volker Goetze is a German-born New York based composer, trumpeter and filmmaker. He toured West Africa, Europe and Asia. He is featured on numerous recordings, and recorded with international artists such as Nana Vasconcelos, Lenny Pickett and others. He has also performed with Steve Lacy, Brian Lynch, Peter Kowald, and Craig Handy.

Goetze graduated from the BMI Jazz Composers Workshop in 2007. He was a recipient of a full scholarship by the DAAD, and won 1st prize from the Dr. Konrad Kraemer Culture Award. In 2005 his composition, “Tree”, for large ensemble, was nominated for the BMI Charlie Parker Composition Award. "Tree" has been performed at the Merkin Hall in New York City. Volker Goetze studied with trumpeter Markus Stockhausen at the Hochschule für Musik Köln and Michael Mossmann at the Aaron Copland School of Music in New York City.

In 2007, he signed a record deal with ObliqSound, for a duo project with Ablaye Cissoko, a master Kora-player and singer from Senegal, which Goetze produced. The music was recorded in Africa, and the CD was released in October 2008. Part of the artist’s profit goes to TOSTAN, a human-rights organization in West Africa. In addition, Goetze's large ensemble CD and surround DVD, recorded at the Clive Davis Studio in New York City, will be released soon. Future projects include a multimedia event for a silent movie of Fritz Lang, which will comprise musicians from New York and Senegal, with performances in Dakar and New York.

Goetze co-wrote, directed and co-produced a full-length documentary film about Cissoko, and the role of griots in Africa entitled Griot.
