= Oded Tzur =

Israeli-American saxophonist and composer

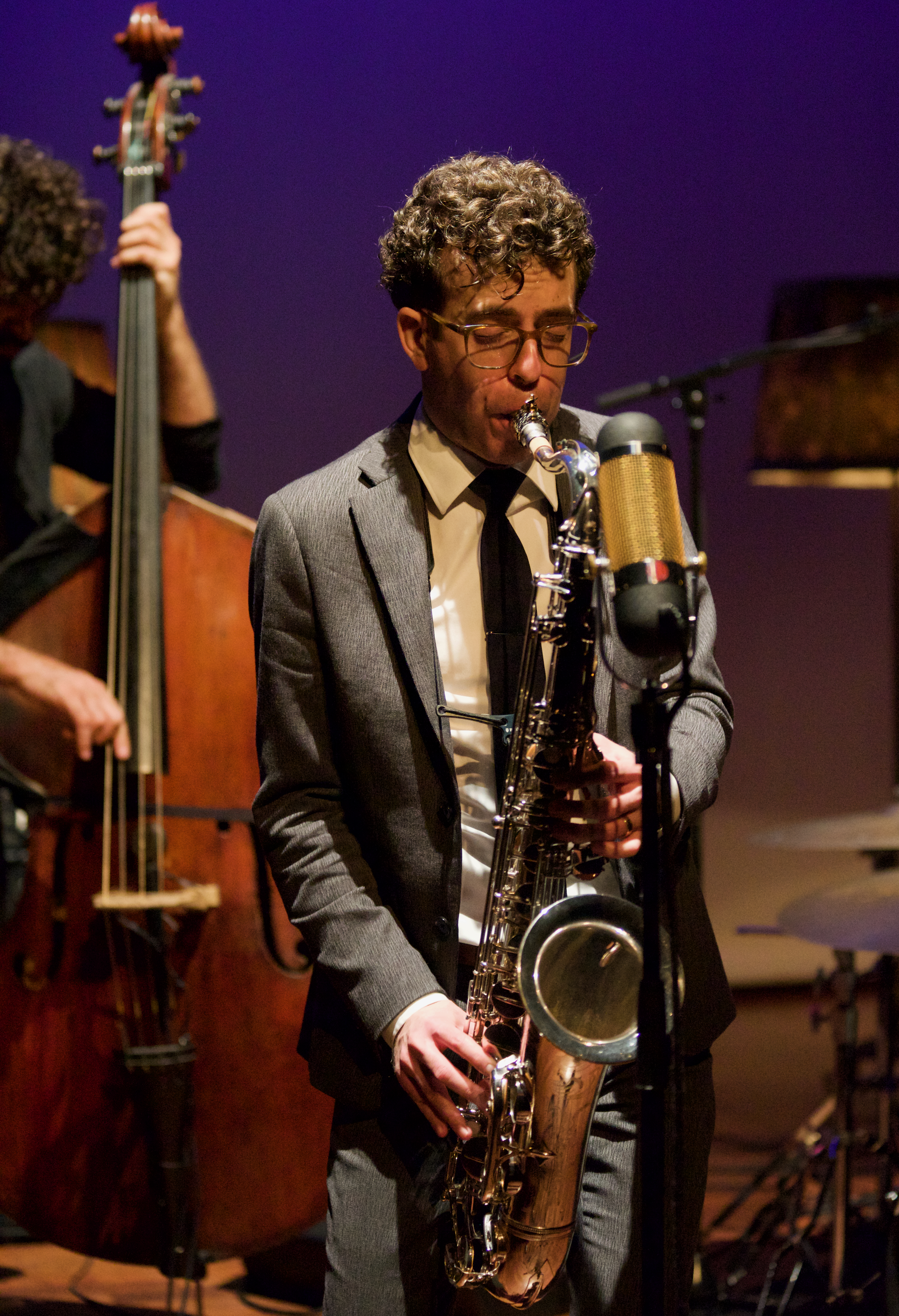
Tzur in 2021

Oded Tzur (Hebrew: עודד צור; born January 5, 1984) is an Israeli, New York City based saxophonist, composer, bandleader and educator. His work focuses on fundamental connections between several different musical traditions, among them are Indian Classical Music and Jazz, and draws inspiration from the art of storytelling. His sound on the tenor saxophone results from a technique he developed while studying Indian Classical Music, which has been credited with giving his instrument pioneering dimension and depth.

== Background ==
Tzur was born in Tel Aviv, Israel, in 1984. He studied jazz and classical music in the Thelma Yellin High School For The Arts and the Jerusalem Academy before being accepted as a disciple of Hariprasad Chaurasia, a stalwart of Indian classical music, at the Rotterdam World Music Academy. During this time Tzur developed a saxophone technique that extends the instrument's microtonal capacity, inspired by Chaurasia's Bansuri playing and other Indian instruments, which he named Middle Path.

The technique enables the saxophone to slide between the notes and highlight specific microtones, and differs from traditional saxophone playing to a significant extent. Hariprasad Chaurasia once described it by saying: “If a curtain were to be drawn in front of him, no one could tell which instrument was being played”.

== Career ==
Tzur first presented Middle Path in an academic context during the 2011 British Saxophone Congress in Trinity College of Music. Since then his findings were presented at other academic institutions, such as the Amsterdam Conservatory, Copenhagen Conservatory and the Juilliard School.

Tzur moved to New York in 2011 and established his first quartet with Shai Maestro, Petros Klampanis and Ziv Ravitz, which was referred to as The Coltrane Quartet Of The 21st Century by CD Journal, a Japanese jazz magazine. Tzur's latest version of his quartet features Nitai Hershkovits on the piano and Johnathan Blake on drums, while Petros Klampanis remains on the bass chair.

Tzur released his first two albums on Enja Records, which received international acclaim and brought him to the attention of producer Manfred Eicher of ECM Records. Tzur's third album, Here Be Dragons, was released on ECM. The album was referred to as an instant classic. Additionally, Tzur's unexpected performance of "Can't Help Falling In Love With You", made famous by Elvis Presley, was credited with confirming the universal nature of his work.

== Discography ==
- Like A Great River (Enja Records, 2015)
- Translator's Note (Enja Records, 2017)
- Here Be Dragons (ECM Records, 2020)
- Isabela (ECM Records, 2022)
- My Prophet (ECM Records, 2024)
- Make A Sound (Sky River Music, 2026)
- In the Arms of a True Believer (Sky River Music, 2026)

== Interdisciplinary work ==
In 2019, Tzur was invited to work with the Juilliard School, where choreographer Jamar Roberts created a dance piece to "The Song of the Silent Dragon", from Tzur's debut album, Like A Great River.
