= Jana Herzen =

American singer-songwriter

- Born: April 24, 1959; San Francisco, California, U.S.
- Genres: Jazz, world music
- Occupation(s): Musician, singer-songwriter, music producer, label owner
- Instrument(s): Kalimba, guitar, bass guitar, didgeridoo
- Years active: 2003–present
- Labels: Motéma
- Website: Official site

Jana Herzen (born April 24, 1959 in Washington, D.C.), is a singer-songwriter with folk, world, rock, and jazz influences who founded Motéma Music, a record label focused on jazz and world music. Before founding the label in 2003, she worked as a musician (her album Soup's on Fire being the label's first release) and as an art agent for Winston Smith, a collage artist published by Last Gasp who designed the logo for Motéma. Since then, her company has published over 200 recordings, including over 25 albums with Grammy nominations or awards.

== Biography ==
Her parents were university professors Leonard Herzenberg and Leonore Herzenberg, and she was raised on the campus of Stanford University. After graduating from high school, she spent a year taking a theater internship and traveling to the UK to perform as a musician before enrolling in Stanford in 1977. After dropping out after her second year to work as a theatrical production manager and lighting designer in San Francisco, she enrolled at New York University (NYU) in 1980, where she graduated with an undergraduate degree in drama in 1982.

After graduating from NYU, she founded the theatre production group Manhattan Class Company with Bernard Telsey, Robert LuPone, and five other NYU graduates. During her ten year membership in the group she served as a dramaturg, script doctor, lighting designer, actor, and director, while also separately performing as a singer and guitarist.

In 1991, Herzen left the theatre group to pursure her ambition of becoming a professional musician. She left Manhattan, traveling to Japan, Bali, and Australia, working on songs for her first album as she went. In 1994 she traveled to Paris to record her songs with the Congolese worldbeat bassist and producer Shaka Ra Mutela.

After moving to San Francisco and failing to secure a record deal for two years, Herzen attempted to independently release her album, entitled "Soup's on Fire". While she shortened her stage name to Jana Herzen and attempted to market her album under the vanity imprint Motéma Music (Motéma meaning Heart in the Central African language of Lingala), its popularity failed to pick up. A few years later, she hired David Neidhart and Suzi Reynolds, record industry veterans, to help her relaunch her music label with the distribution deals needed to make it have a chance at success. Motéma Music subsequently relaunched in 2003 as an official record label, with her album, Soul Pools by Babatunde Lee, and Arise by Lynne Arrialle all set to release via the label that year. Their success prompted the release of additional albums by other artists, allowing Motéma Music to continue operations. While the label came to be known over time for the many jazz and world music albums that it published, it did not require its artists to stick to specific genres, rather seeking to provide a home for "artists of power and distinction". In addition to distributing her own albums via the label, Herzen served as the producer and executive procuder for many albums from other musicians signed to Motéma Music.

Herzen moved back to New York in 2005, with the head office of Motéma moving there as well.

On February 10, 2020 she married her long time friend and musical partner Charnett Moffett. They moved back to San Francisco later that year along with the head office of Motéma. They subsequently ran the record label together, producing several records and hosting online livestreams. After COVID-19 lockdowns were lifted, they performed Moffett's trio album "Live" at live venues, followed by a residency in January 2022, recorded for future release as an album. Plans for the album were disrupted when Moffett died suddenly of a heart attack on April 11, 2022.

== Discography ==
=== Albums ===
- Soup's on Fire (Motéma, 2003)
- Passion of a Lonely Heart ([Motéma, 2012)
- Overtones (Note: With Charnett Moffett as the Nett Duo) (Motéma, 2018)
- Nothing But Love (Motéma, 2020)
- Round The World (Note: With Charnett Moffett) (Motéma, 2020)

=== Singles ===
- Mystery (Motéma, 2021)

=== Produced ===
- Soul Pools by Babatunde Lea (Motéma, 2003)
- Let's Fly by Amy London (Motéma, 2011)
- Harlem – Kingston Express Live! by Monty Alexander (Motéma, 2011)
- The Bridge - Solo Bass Works by Charnett Moffett (Motéma, 2013)
- Music from Our Soul by Charnett Moffett (Motéma, 2017)
- A Lovesome Thing [Live at Philharmonie de Paris] by Geri Allen and Kurt Rosenwinkel (Motéma, 2023)
