= A Lovesome Thing (Geri Allen and Kurt Rosenwinkel album) =

Live album by Geri Allen and Kurt Rosenwinkel
- Released: 2023
- Recorded: September 5, 2012
- Venue: Jazz à la Villette, Paris
- Genre: Jazz
- Length: 53:28
- Label: Motéma / Heartcore; MTM0427
- Producer: Jana Herzen, Kurt Rosenwinkel

Geri Allen chronology
Live at the Village Vanguard: Unissued Tracks (2022)	A Lovesome Thing (2023)

A Lovesome Thing is a live album by pianist Geri Allen and guitarist Kurt Rosenwinkel. Featuring three jazz standards plus two original compositions, it was recorded on September 5, 2012, at Jazz à la Villette in Paris, and was released on CD in 2023 by both Motéma Music and Rosenwinkel's Heartcore label.

The album documents the only recorded collaboration between the two musicians, although Allen frequently spoke of her desire to create a studio recording that would capture what she called the "flow and freedom" she experienced during her performance with Rosenwinkel. However, she died before such a recording session could be arranged. A Lovesome Thing is dedicated to her memory.

== Reception ==
Professional ratings
Review scores
Source	Rating
All About Jazz	4.5/5 stars
All About Jazz	3.5/5 stars
All About Jazz	4.5/5 stars
AllMusic	4.5/5 stars
Jazz Trail	4/5 stars
Jazzwise	4/5 stars
Marlbank	5/5 stars

In a review for AllMusic, Matt Collar noted that Allen and Rosenwinkel bring an "improvisational flow and sense of being present in the creative moment" to the performance, and wrote: "Their playing is rapturous and enveloping... Often it sounds as if they are discovering a song as they go along... Throughout all of A Lovesome Thing, Allen and Rosenwinkel's playing is endlessly inventive and bright with the promise of more collaborations to come."

Kevin Le Gendre of Jazzwise stated: "the artistic empathy between Allen and Rosenwinkel makes this programme of standards and originals a 'wish you were there' affair... Piano-guitar duos are a relatively rare beast in the history of jazz... Allen-Rosenwinkel are now an excellent addition to the pantheon."

Jazz Journal's Simon Adams called the album "sublime" and "an unexpectedly moving set." He commented: "On paper, the dynamic Allen and the laconic Rosenwinkel might not have a lot in common, but here they prove to be virtuosic soulmates, enthralling the listener with layers of ambiguous but elegant expression... this mesmerising concert provides a glimpse of what might have been."

Writing for The New York City Jazz Record, Ken Dryden described the concert as "one for the ages," and remarked: "Both musicians enjoyed playing in a free-flowing manner that allowed plenty of room for improvising. The extended performances from this concert are a joy, with no wasted space, nor any danger of either one of them running out of ideas or taking one chorus too many."

In an article for All About Jazz, Dave Linn stated that the album "captured the magical synergy which occurred and showed the essence and skill of two like-minded musicians finding common ground through empathy and improvisation." He wrote: "Both players were at the top of their game and had come together without the benefit of rehearsal, which allowed the music to simply flow through them and the results heard here are both exhilarating and spiritual." AAJ's Pierre Giroux called the album "mesmerizing," and noted that the musicians "seamlessly blend their craft to approach a thoughtful selection of standards and original compositions." AAJ writer Neil Duggan commented: "This is a gentle, mellow and exquisite recording which rewards deep listening. Across the five tracks, their synergy is clear and the piano and guitar tones blend to create an improvised and interwoven soundscape."

George W. Harris of Jazz Weekly remarked: "wondrous interpretations of standards and an original each make for an inspiring evening... With 10 years of retrospection, this concert grows in importance."

Jazz Trail's Filipe Freitas wrote: "Two master musicians... showcase a free-spirited melodic vocabulary and profound harmonic insight on this live recording... They emanate a natural and relaxed aura that permeates the music, leaving it imprinted with their distinctive musical signatures and tremendous improvisational capabilities."

A writer for Marlbank singled out Allen's composition "Open Handed Reach" for praise, stating: "in her writing you get, as you do with the writing of Wayne Shorter, a certain mystical magic and resource. What a gift from the past to hear this today - a unique document and welcome reminder again of the very special sound of Geri Allen speaking to us so personally once again."

== Track listing ==
1. "A Flower Is a Lovesome Thing" (Billy Strayhorn) – 10:19
2. "Embraceable You" (George Gershwin, Ira Gershwin) – 11:47
3. "Geri's Introductions" – 1:13
4. "Simple #2" (Kurt Rosenwinkel) – 7:52
5. "Ruby, My Dear" (Thelonious Monk) – 11:21
6. "Kurt's Introductions" – 0:10
7. "Open-Handed Reach" (Geri Allen) – 10:50

== Personnel ==
- Geri Allen – piano
- Kurt Rosenwinkel – guitar
