= Joe Locke (musician) =

American jazz vibraphonist

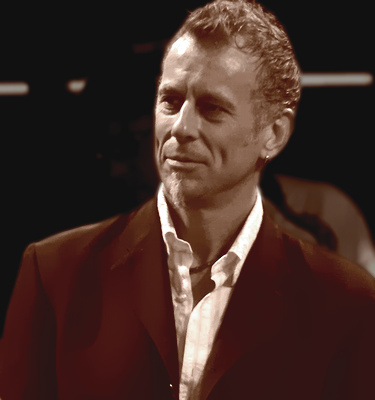

Background information
- Born: Joseph Paul Locke; March 18, 1959 (age 67); Palo Alto, California, U.S.
- Genres: Jazz
- Occupation: Musician
- Instrument: Vibraphone
- Years active: 1981–present
- Labels: SteepleChase, Milestone, Sharp Nine, Sirocco, Origin, Motema

Joseph Paul Locke (born March 18, 1959) is an American jazz vibraphonist.

== Life and career ==
A native of Palo Alto, California, Locke grew up in Rochester, New York. His father taught music. When Locke was eight years old he began learning drums and piano, then started on vibraphone five years later. After playing in rock bands, he became attracted to jazz in his teen years and attended the Eastman School of Music in Rochester.

In 1981, he moved to New York City and worked as a sideman for Kenny Barron, Freddy Cole, Marvin Smith, and Eddie Henderson. For influences, he has cited Milt Jackson and Bobby Hutcherson. His first solo album, Present Tense, was released by Steeplechase in 1990. He started the band Mutual Appreciation Society in 1999 with David Hazeltine, Essiet Essiet, and Billy Drummond and has recorded frequently with pianist Geoff Keezer. His album Four Walls of Freedom was based on the writings of Thomas Merton.

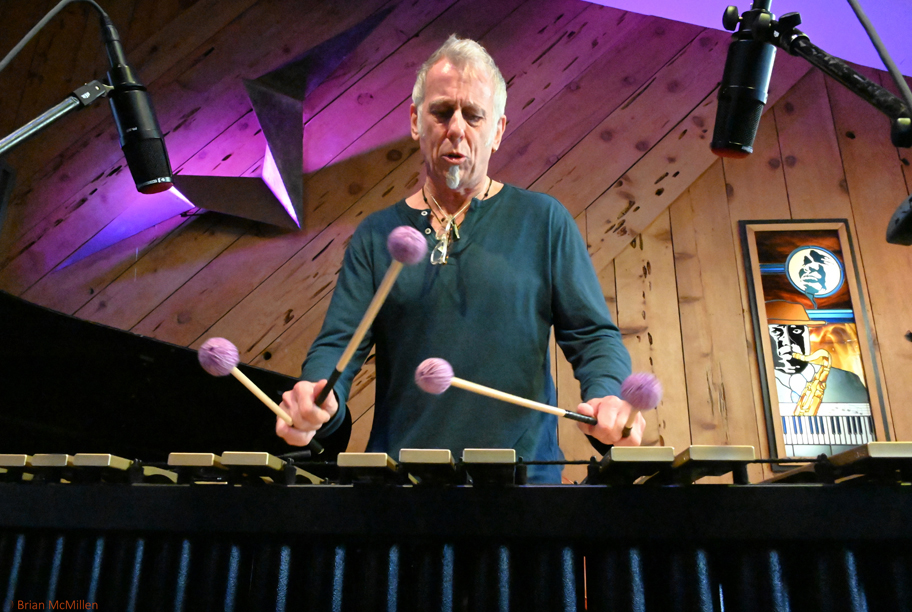
Joe Locke at Bach Dancing & Dynamite Society, Half Moon Bay CA 7/14/19

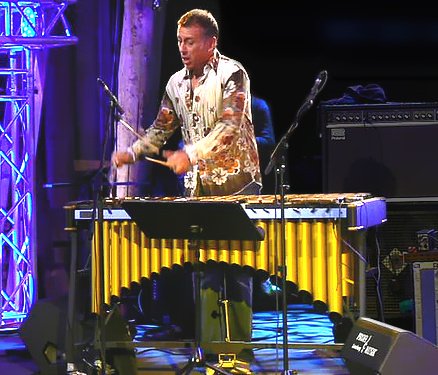
Locke performing in 2007

In 2016, he was inducted into the Music Hall of Fame in Rochester. Joe Locke is the International Vibraphone Consultant at the Royal Academy of Music and holds the title of Hon ARAM. He has won the Mallet Instrumentalist of the Year Award from the Jazz Journalists Association on six occasions.

== Discography ==
=== As leader/co-leader ===
- Present Tense (SteepleChase, 1990)
- Scenario (Cadence Jazz, 1987)
- But Beautiful with Kenny Barron (SteepleChase, 1991)
- Longing (SteepleChase, 1991)
- Wire Walker (SteepleChase, 1993)
- Moment to Moment (Milestone, 1995)
- Very Early (SteepleChase, 1995)
- Sound Tracks (Milestone, 1997)
- Mutual Admiration Society with David Hazeltine (Sharp Nine, 1999)
- Saturn's Child with Frank Kimbrough (OmniTone, 1999)
- Beauty Burning (Sirocco, 2000)
- Storytelling (Sirocco, 2001)
- State of Soul (Sirocco, 2002)
- The Willow with Frank Kimbrough (OmniTone, 2002)
- Four Walls of Freedom (Sirocco, 2003)
- Dear Life (Sirocco, 2004)
- Revelation (Sharp Nine, 2005)
- Live in Seatlle with Geoff Keezer (Sharp Nine, 2005)
- Sticks and Strings (Jazz Eyes, 2007)
- Force of Four (Origin, 2008)
- Live at JazzBaltica with Trio Da Paz (MAXJAZZ, 2008)
- Mutual Admiration Society 2 with David Hazeltine (Sharp Nine, 2009)
- Nocturne for Ava with Bob Sneider (Origin, 2009)
- For the Love of You (E1, 2010)
- Via (Origin, 2011)
- Signing (Motema, 2012)
- Wish Upon A Star (Motema, 2012)
- Lay Down My Heart (Motema, 2013)
- Love Is a Pendulum (Motema, 2015)
- Subtle Disguise (Origin, 2018)
- Makram (Circle 9, 2023)
