= Chris Jennings (musician) =

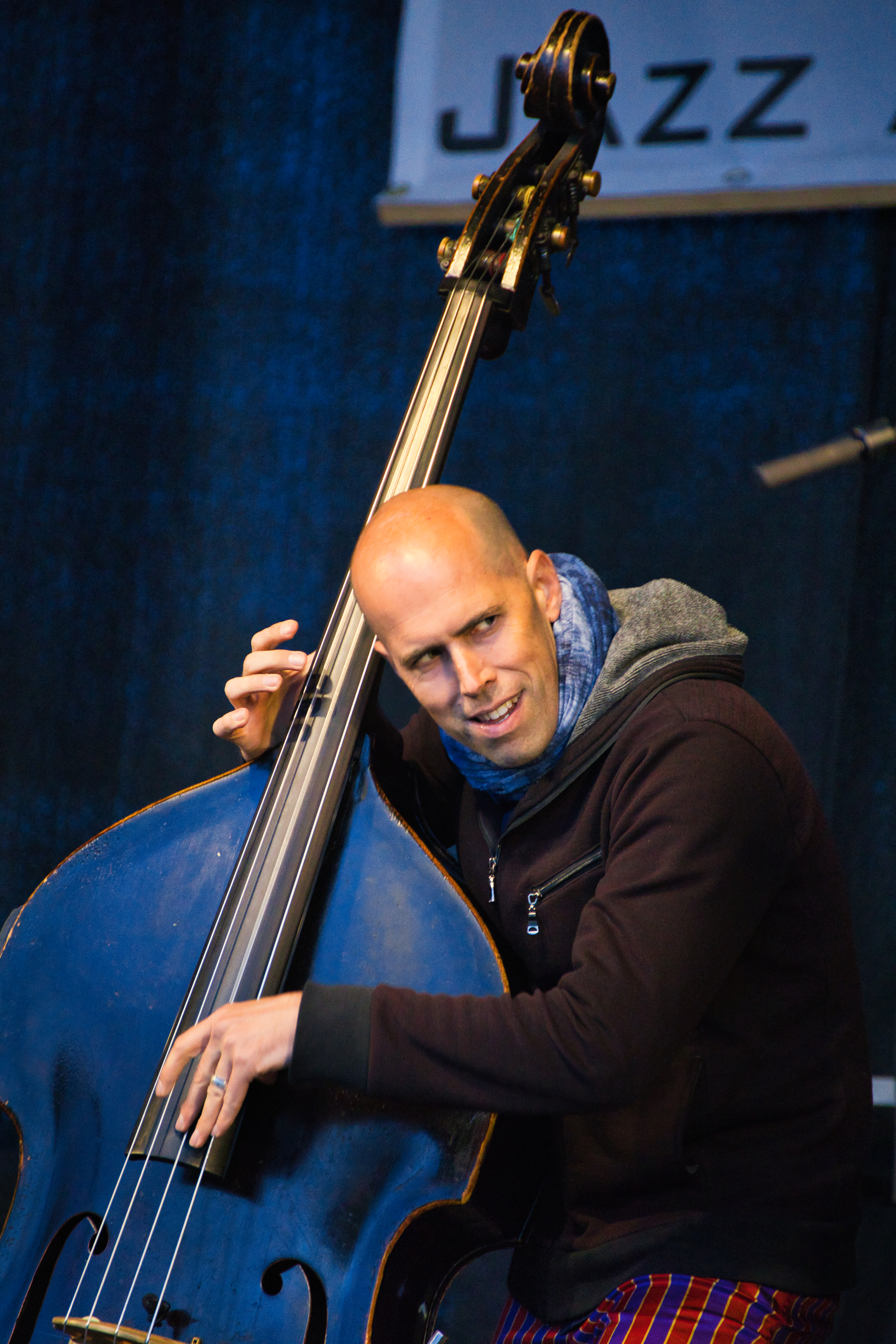

Background information
- Born: 12 August 1978 (age 48); Calgary, Alberta, Canada
- Genres: Jazz, world music
- Occupations: Musician, composer, arranger, teacher
- Instruments: Double bass, electric bass
- Years active: 1993–present
- Labels: Promise Land Records, MusicJustMusic
- Website: www.chrisjenningsbass.com

Chris Jennings is a Canadian jazz (left handed) double bassist, composer, arranger and educator.

== Biography ==
=== Early life and career ===
Growing up in Calgary, Alberta, Canada, he began studying music early on piano and classical guitar before moving to electric bass and then double bass. He attended the Banff Centre for the Arts Jazz Workshop in 1996 under the direction of Kenny Wheeler.

He moved to Toronto, Ontario, in 1996 to complete a bachelor's degree in music performance at the University of Toronto.

=== European life and career (since 2002 to date) ===
Moving to Europe in 2002, he has established himself as an international Canadian double bassist based in Paris, France.

With guitarist Nguyên Lê he is currently in his "Fire & Water Trio" with percussionist Stephan Edouard and Nguyên Lê's "Streams" Quartet.

In 2015 he began as bassist with pianist Joachim Kühn's "New Trio", with drummer Eric Schaefer.

He also took on a melodic role, as well as bassist, in the creation of Titi Robin's "Nargis" Trio with Iranian percussionist Habib Meftah.

=== As leader ===
Releasing in 2011 of his self-titled Chris Jennings Quartet CD on Promise Land Records featuring Manu Codjia (el. gtr), Pierre Perchaud (ac. gtr), Patrick Goraguer (drums), he also led the Country Jazz Trio with American drummer Leon Parker for three years. Jennings/Perchaud acoustic duo began 2006, and trio featuring guitarist/percussionist Kevin Seddiki and the young Belgium vocalist revelation Lynn Cassiers since 2011. A co-leader project with trombonist Karin Hammar was created in 2012 featuring Ingrid Jensen. As well as the Chris Jennings Solo Double Bass project and the Chris Jennings String Quintet, his group Drum'n Koto Trio featuring Mieko Miyazaki (Japanese koto) and Patrick Goraguer (drums/santour) whose album received disc of the Day (TSF Jazz Radio France), disc of the week (FIP Radio France) and disc of the month.

=== Studies and teaching ===
Since 1996, Jennings completed residencies at the Banff Centre for the Arts Canada, a Bachelors (B.A.) in Jazz Performance from the University of Toronto, Canada (2000) and a Masters (M.A.) in Music from the Royal Conservatory of The Hague, the Netherlands (2004).

He is on faculty at the Didier Lockwood Music School (Centre Musiques Didier Lockwood - CMDL), since 2005 and having taught at the Conservatory of Chelles France for 7 years.

=== Instruments and endorsements ===
Jennings plays a custom built left-handed Thomas Martin double bass (2004), a Croatian double bass circa 1880 converted into a neck off for air travel by David Gage, a "Lolita" electric double bass by Hervé Prudent (2011) as well as a Saz (Nino le Saz) by luthier Hervé Prudent and a custom made 6 string electric bass (1992) by Tak Hosono (Ibenez basses) designed and constructed with the help of his mentor, Canadian bassist Dale James.

Jennings is endorsed by d'Addario Bowed Strings and by David Gage Realist pick-ups.

== Discography ==
Album as leader/co-leader	Year	Label
Chris Jennings 5 Ways Home – Boy, She's the Dandy (Kalle Kalima, Patrick Goraguer, Eric Schaefer, Hayden Chisholm feat. Rachel Eckroth)	2024	Eden River Records & Promise Land (distr. Socadisc)
Chris Jennings Drum'n Koto – Drum'n Koto (Mieko Miyazaki, Patrick Goraguer, feat. Nguyên Lê & Kudsi Erguner)	2013	MusicJustMusic (Digital)
Chris Jennings Drum'n Koto – Drum'n Koto (Mieko Miyazaki, Patrick Goraguer, feat. Nguyên Lê & Kudsi Erguner)	2013	Promise Land (distr. Socadisc)
Hammar/Jennings Group Land (featuring Ingrid Jensen)	2012	Skip Records
Chris Jennings Drum'n Koto – From Tokyo to Tehran (feat. Mieko Miyazaki, Patrick Goraguer)	2012	MusicJustMusic
Chris Jennings Quartet August – Special Edition (feat. Manu Codjia, Pierre Perchaud, Patrick Goraguer)	2012	MusicJustMusic
Chris Jennings Quartet – Chris Jennings Quartet (feat. Manu Codjia, Pierre Perchaud, Patrick Goraguer)	2011	Promise Land Records
Chris Jennings String Quintet – Works I	2010	MusicJustMusic
Chris Jennings Solo Double Bass – Live at the Banff Centre	2010	MusicJustMusic
Jennings/Perchaud Duo – Paris to the Rockies	2008	MusicJustMusic
Chris Jennings Solo Double Bass – Left Turn Signal	2002	MusicJustMusic

Album as a sideman	Year	Label
John Hadfield – Paris Quartet (feat.Sylvain Rifflet, Jozef Dumoulin, Chris Jennings, John Hadfield-drums)	2021	Outnote Records
David Linx – Skin in the Game (feat.Gregroy Privat, Arnaud Dolmen-drums)	2019	Cristal Records
Gregory Privat – Soley	2019	Buddham Jazz
Nguyên Lê – Streams (feat.Ilya Amar-vibes, John Hadfield-drums)	2019	ACT Music
Macha Gharibian – Joy Ascension (feat.Dré Pallemaerts-drums)	2019	Meredith Records
Céline Bonacina – Fly Fly (feat.Jean Luc Di Fraya-drums/perc/voix, Guest-Pierre Durand-gtr)	2019	Cristal Records
Joachim Kühn – Love & Peace	2018	ACT Music
David Aubaile – Thinko (feat. Karim Ziad-drums)	2018	Promise Land Records
Jeremy Hababou – Nuances (with Lukmil Perez-drums)	2018	Outhere Music
Marko Churnchetz – Ruthenia (feat. Mike Moreno gtr., Rudy Royston drms)	2017	Fresh Sound
Joachim Kühn – Beauty & Truth	2016	ACT Music
Céline Bonacina Crystal Quartet – Cristal Rain (feat. pianist Gwilym Simcock)	2016	Crystal Records (France)
Loïs Le Van – So Much More	2016	Hevhetia
Alex Saada – Wefree	2016	Promise Land Records (France)
Nguyên Lê/Thong Duong – Doc Dao	2014	Vietnam
Francesco Nastro – Colors of Light	2014	Via Veneto Jazz (Italy)
Thomas Enhco – Fireflies	2013	Label Bleu (France)
Hervé Cercal – Bel Air for Piano	2013	Jazz Caribéen
El Gusto Chaabi Orchestra – El Gusto	2012	Zylo
Thomas Enhco Trio – The Window and the Rain (with guests Terumasa Hino & Kiyohiko Semba)	2011	Happinet (Japan)
Lee Konitz feat. Giovanni Ceccerelli French Trio – Waxin' in Camerino	2011	Philology Records (Italy)
Dhafer Youssef Quartet – Abu Nawas Rhapsody (feat. Tigran Hamasyan, Chris Jennings, Mark Guiliana)	2010	EmArcy
Jean Becker – Deux Jours à Tuer (film music)	2008	StudioCanal
Yabai Piano Trio – Yabai	2008	autoproduction
Leila Olivesi – l'Etrange Fleur	2007	Plus Loin Music (France)
Alex Saada Quintet – Be Where You Are	2005	Promise Land Records (France)
University of Stockholm – Älskade Sånger	2003	(Sweden)
Alex Saada – Éveil	2003	Promise Land Records (France)
Barry Romberg – Three Blind Mice	2002	Romhog Records (Canada)
Ronley Teper – Tales From the Tray	2001	autoproduction (Canada)
Sound of Toronto Jazz Series – Hear the Color of Jazz	1999	CBC Radio (Canada)
Silke Eberhard – Inspiration Expiration	1999	autoproduction (Germany)
