= 9 Horses =

American chamber jazz group

- Origin: New York City
- Genres: Jazz, avant-garde jazz, experimental, chamber jazz
- Years active: 2013–present
- Labels: Sunnyside, Adhyâropa Records
- Members: Joseph Brent, Sara Caswell, Andrew Ryan
- Past members: Shawn Conley, Ben Wittman, Emily Hope Price, Ike Sturm, Nathan Koci, Justin Goldner, Brett Parnell, Taylor Haskins
- Website: www.josephbrent.com/9horses

9 Horses is a chamber jazz group from the United States consisting of composer and mandolinist Joseph Brent, violinist Sara Caswell, and bassist Andrew Ryan, originating from New York City.

== History ==
Brent and bassist Shawn Conley first played together in 2010 in Brent's short-lived project The Joe Brent Quartet, which also featured clarinetist Hideaki Aomori and guitarist Nadav Lev. However, when Brent's commitments to Regina Spektor's touring band and his teaching responsibilities at Mannes College spread his time too thin, he put the quartet project on hold. In 2012, he started performing as a duo with Caswell, and after releasing Joe Brent & Sara Caswell EP together in 2013, they decided to add a bass player and Brent called on Conley once again, renaming the new ensemble after the Billy Collins poem of the same name. After making the finals of the 2014 Concert Artists Guild Victor Elmaleh Competition, they were signed to Sunnyside Records and released their debut album, Perfectest Herald in October, 2015. The recording includes percussionist Ben Wittman, but live performances generally feature either the trio alone, or guest musicians such as Emily Hope Price or Ike Sturm. In 2016, after adding Ryan, they were the 1st Prize winners of the inaugural 21CM Launch: Emerging Artists competition.

Brent is originally from Queens, New York, but spent much of his childhood in Tampa, Florida. Caswell is from Bloomington, Indiana, while Ryan hails from Denver, Colorado.

Brent was formerly a member of Regina Spektor's band, is an active classical soloist, and with Caswell he occasionally performs with Kishi Bashi. Caswell is also a member of Esperanza Spalding's Chamber Music Society and David Krakauer's The Big Picture. Ryan performs with newgrass ensemble The Freewheel Trio, Canadian folk musician Kaia Kater, and has been a member of OneBeat.

The trio's music, all of which is composed or arranged by Brent, combines elements of improvised musical forms with classical chamber music and Brent's own indie rock influences. The four movement piece entitled Perfectest Herald which gives the album its name and acts as its centerpiece contains elements of rock, new music, Middle Eastern music, jazz, rhythm and blues, and traditional classical music, most notably in the 2nd movement, listening to the Elliott Smith discography in reverse order, in which a single musical subject passes through all of the aforementioned genres and a fugue before recapitulating. Budd Kopmann of All About Jazz described the music for the 'Perfectest Herald' suite as "...among the most life affirming one will ever hear... Regardless of which emotional depths Brent drew on to compose these pieces, this highly emotive music touches and communicates the essence of what it means to be an alive, feeling human being."

== Discography ==
=== As Joe Brent & Sara Caswell ===
- Joe Brent & Sara Caswell EP (2013)

=== As 9 Horses ===
==== Studio albums ====
- Perfectest Herald (2015)
- Blood From a Stone (EP) (2019)
- Omegah (2021)
- Strum (2024)
- Strumming Music (EP) (2024)

=== Other contributions ===
Year	Artist	Album	Description
2013	Kishi Bashi	7" Box Set	Brent and Caswell play violin
2014	Lauren Kinhan	Circle in the Square	Brent and Caswell play violin
2015	Kishi Bashi	String Quartet Live!	Brent plays mandolin and violin; Caswell plays violin
2018	The Mountain Goats and Welcome to Night Vale	I Only Listen to the Mountain Goats: All Hail West Texas	Brent plays electric mandolin and Ryan plays bass with Erin McKeown on Brent's arrangement of 'Jenny'
2024	Christopher Zuar	Exuberance	Brent plays mandolin and Caswell plays violin

Adhyâropa Records
- Founded: 2021
- Founder: Joe Brent
- Genre: Jazz, Nu jazz, World music, Americana
- Country of origin: U.S.
- Location: New York City
- Official website: www.adhyaroparecords.com

== Adhyâropa Records ==
Adhyâropa Records is an American record company and label established by Joe Brent of the band 9 Horses in 2021 initially to release their own music and that of musicians affiliated with 9 Horses, but have branched out to release music by others across several genres. Albums by Darol Anger, Lenny Pickett, Rachel Eckroth, Jane Ira Bloom, and many other notable musicians followed, and Adhyâropa continues to release cross-genre selection of jazz, Americana, Classical, and World music.

In 2026, Adhyâropa Records expanded to include Adhyâropa UK, a UK-based division of the label dedicated to UK-based artists headed by Rob Cope. Later that same year, Adhyâropa announced Adhyâropa EU, headed by Wynnm Murphy and based in Amsterdam, and Adhyâropa Japan, headed by Megumi Tenyu.

Their coiled snake logo was designed by Emily Hope Price of folk-pop band Pearl and the Beard, a frequent 9 Horses collaborator. "Adhyâropa," in Hinduism, is the superimposition of the imaginary upon the real. The famous example of this was given by Śaṅkara, the pre-eminent philosopher and proponent of Advaita Vedānta, in which a rope on a path is believed to be a snake.

== Discography ==
Catalog No.	Album	Artist
ÂR00001	Omegah	9 Horses
ÂR00002	Joe Brent & Sara Caswell EP	Joe Brent & Sara Caswell
ÂR00003	Point of Departure	Joe Brent
ÂR00004	solo. EP	Joe Brent
ÂR00005	The Solomon Diaries Vol. I	Sam Sadigursky
ÂR00006	The Solomon Diaries Vol. II	Sam Sadigursky
ÂR00007	The Solomon Diaries Vol. III	Sam Sadigursky
ÂR00009	Morning Song	Matt Aronoff
ÂR00010	The Jacob Jolliff Band	Jacob Jolliff
ÂR00011	Figures/Broken Pieces	Sam Sadigursky
ÂR00012	Gambit	Ethan Setiawan
ÂR00013	This Entity Makes Music	Nick Rousseau
ÂR00014	soma schema	Joshua Stamper
ÂR00015	Perfectest Herald	9 Horses
ÂR00016	Emily + Sue	Dana Kaufman
ÂR00017	If Not Now, Who?	Joe K. Walsh
ÂR00018	LCO Live Vol. 1: Mozart Symphony No. 41 "Jupiter"	Lowell Chamber Orchestra
ÂR00019	LCO Live Vol. 2: Arnold Friedman Postlude	Lowell Chamber Orchestra
ÂR00020	Alive	Nick Rousseau
ÂR00021	Sauntering towards light	Sean Hannon
ÂR00022	Open the Doors	Hilary Hawke and Claude & Ola
ÂR00023	5 Movements for Solo Clarinet	Sam Sadigursky
ÂR00024	Time Took Care of It	Danny Fox Trio
ÂR00026	Empathy	Nick Rousseau
ÂR00027	Jared Saltiel	Jared Saltiel
ÂR00028	LCO Live Vol. 3: Émile Bernard Divertissement pour instruments à vent, Op. 36	Lowell Chamber Orchestra
ÂR00029	Hidden Animals	Ben Krakauer
ÂR00030	LCO Live Vol. 4: Béla Bartók Romanian Folk Dances, Sz. 68, BB 76	Lowell Chamber Orchestra
ÂR00031	Imitation	M. Alex Ramírez
ÂR00032	noonmoon	noonmoon
ÂR00033	Darts	Arnie Sainz
ÂR00034	Lyric Pieces	Sarah M. Silverman
ÂR00035	Intimations	Andrew Ryan
ÂR00036	36 Clarinet Duets	Sam Sadigursky
ÂR00037	With The Changes	Carlin Lee
ÂR00038	George Jackson's Local Trio	George Jackson
ÂR00039	Olivia	Olivia Pérez-Collellmir
ÂR00040	Stars and Constellations	Quinsin Nachoff
ÂR00041	Instrumentals, Vol. 1	Jacob Jolliff
ÂR00042	The Great Beyond	Nick Rousseau
ÂR00043	Mr Sun Plays Duke Ellington's Nutcracker Suite	Mr Sun
ÂR00044	EZRA	EZRA
ÂR00045	LCO Live Vol. 5: Samuel Barber Adagio for Strings	Lowell Chamber Orchestra
ÂR00046	Sule Skerry	Hildaland
ÂR00047	Barberia's Delight	Tima Volozh & Marshal Herridge
ÂR00048	Standards on Snare, Mandolin, and Bass Clarinet	Jason Burger, Jacob Jolliff, & Alec Spiegelman
ÂR00049	Cricket Cipher	Air Space
ÂR00050	ECOLOGIES	How to See Know and Fall
ÂR00051	Toy Conscious	Toy Conscious
ÂR00052	It's Not Not A Christmas Album	Ross Holmes and Bobby Hawk
ÂR00053	Dissolve	Richard Nelson
ÂR00054	Letters of Transit	Dean Olsher
ÂR00055	Across the Great Divide, vol. 1	Ethan Setiawan
ÂR00056	The Lost Summer	Louise Bichan
ÂR00057	Bass Fiddler	Nate Sabat
ÂR00058	REVOLUTIONS	Dan Loomis
ÂR00059	Stronghold	Bobby Hawk
ÂR00060	(after)	Aaron Irwin
ÂR00061	Grassology	Jason Keiser
ÂR00067	Strum	9 Horses
ÂR00070	Time Slips Away	The By & By
ÂR00071	Lingering	Meg Okura & Kevin Hays
ÂR00072	Instrumentals, Vol. 2: Mandolin Mysteries	Jacob Jolliff
ÂR00074	The Volcano Listening Project	Leif Karlstrom
ÂR00075	Earth's Dark Shore	Cecilia Vacanti
ÂR00076	Orchids	Eli Greenhoe & Hans Bilger
ÂR00077	Live at Studio B	Bombici
ÂR00078	Every Journey	Claire Cope
ÂR00079	Beautalina	Eureka Shoes
ÂR00080	The Wizard & the Voyager	Ethan Setiawan & Mauricio Fiore Salas
ÂR00081	Speaking in Tongues	Rachel Eckroth & John Hadfield
ÂR00082	Oneness	Sivan Arbel
ÂR00083	Some Poor Soul Has a Fire	Stan Harrison
ÂR00084	Band of Friends	Band of Friends
ÂR00085	Around the Clock	Daniel Patrick
ÂR00086	I'll See You Again	Max Johnson
ÂR00087	Nebulesque	M. Alex Ramírez
ÂR00088	Mirror Image	Tal Yahalom
ÂR00089	Once Upon A Time In Italy	Francesco Brancato
ÂR00090	A Walk In The Woods	A Walk In The Woods
ÂR00091	Froggy's Demise	EZRA
ÂR00092	Strumming Music	9 Horses
ÂR00093	Saturn	Rachel Eckroth & John Hadfield
ÂR00094	Elevation	Trace & Baerd
ÂR00096	ronsongs	Greg Garrison
ÂR00097	High Horse	High Horse
ÂR00098	Free Fall	Fung Chern Hwei's Fungal Bloom
ÂR00099	Speranza	Scroggins & Rose
ÂR00100	Trust and Love	Joe K. Walsh
ÂR00101	Following Polaris	Atmospheric Trio
ÂR00102	Drunken Heart	Bobby Hawk
ÂR00103	NOMADS	Marcello Zappareddu & Salvatore Maltana
ÂR00104	Third Floor	Marcello Zappareddu
ÂR00105	Every Day I Shit My Pants	The Brullmans
ÂR00106	恋愛至上主義/Love Suprematism	Alexander Dubovoy
ÂR00107	Put A Poultice on Your Soulstice	Bobby Hawk & Ross Holmes
ÂR00108	24 Rhythmic Duets for Clarinet	Sam Sadigursky
ÂR00109	The Ground That Holds You As You Fall Forever	David Leach
ÂR00110	Woken Up In Broken Places	Joel Arnow
ÂR00111	Heard by Others II	Lenny Pickett & John Hadfield
ÂR00112	The Lone Wild Bird	Will Holshouser
ÂR00113	Time Traveler	Ofri Nehemya
ÂR00114	The Solomon Diaries Vol. IV	Sam Sadigursky & Nathan Koci
ÂR00115	The Solomon Diaries Vol. V	Sam Sadigursky & Nathan Koci
ÂR00116	TILT	MixaFortuna, Enrico 'Kikko' Sesselego, & Mario Massa
ÂR00117	Cosmic Cliffs	Aaron Shragge
ÂR00118	Chateau LaDeau	Jon LaDeau
ÂR00119	Isaiah	Meg Okura
ÂR00120	Ad Hawk	Bobby Hawk
ÂR00121	Tony's Dream	Melodrum Trio
ÂR00122	Got My Wings	Dan Blake
ÂR00124	Doubles (Session No. 1)	Ross Holmes
ÂR00125	Lift Up This Old World	Hilary Hawke
ÂR00126	In a Sea of Stars	Zoë Aqua
ÂR00127	Drift	Wes Corbett
ÂR00128	Diary of a Fiddler: #2 The Empty Nest	Darol Anger
ÂR00129	Encyclopedia Mandolinnica	Ethan Setiawan
ÂR00130	Mercy	Inbar Fridman
ÂR00131	Impermanence	Yotam Ben-Or
ÂR00132	Aloft	Edward Hamlin
ÂR00133	Together Yet Alone	Bahar Movahed
ÂR00134	One Year Since	Kate & Brendan
ÂR00135	Echoes of the Gomero	Brian Shankar Adler
ÂR00136	Don't Hate the Potate	Alexander Dubovoy
ÂR00137	Doppelhäwker	Bobby Hawk
ÂR00139	Vivendo e Aprendendo	Ian Coury & Isaac Eicher
ÂR00140	Come Here to Me	And Friends
ÂR00141	Center Of The Universe	George Jackson
ÂR00142	It's Never Too Late For A Blues	Salvatore Maltana
ÂR00143	Listen In	Gui Duvignau
ÂR00144	Sertão do Coração	Ian Coury
ÂR00145	Keegan's Fancy	Seán Keegan
ÂR00146	Olhos de Gato	Rachel Eckroth & John Hadfield
ÂR00147	Dandi	Dandi
ÂR00148	Holding Pattern	Luba Dvorak
ÂR00149	Doubles (Session No. 2)	Ross Holmes
ÂR00150	Timelines	Cohen Almonte Duo
ÂR00151	Hawktagon Musings	Bobby Hawk
ÂR00152	Fiddle Tunes	Hildaland
ÂR00153	State Fête	Billy Martin + Matt Glassmeyer + Jonathan Goldberger
ÂR00154	The Bells of Basel Sliding	John Hadfield
ÂR00155	once like a spark	Jane Ira Bloom & Brian Shankar Adler
ÂR00156	Few Of A Kind	Few Of A Kind
ÂR00157	more ronsongs	Greg Garrison
ÂR00158	Sextet	Ben Ferrell
ÂR00158b	Sonoluminescence	Rafael Chamone
ÂR00159	Jazz Borders	Claudio Bonadè
ÂR00160	Through The Walls	Anna Lowenstein
ÂR00161	Gay All This Time	EmmyJean Jenkins
ÂR00162	The Vigil and the Sleeping Giant	Rebecca Patterson
ÂR00163	Liminal	Elsa Nilsson
ÂR00164	The Good Folk	The Good Folk
ÂR00165	The Bells of Basal Sliding	John Hadfield
ÂR00166	Vi Shturem a Benken: Songs of Longing & Belonging	Reb Tsudek
ÂR00167	Spark	AAron Irwin
ÂR00168	Cabin Songs	Jeremy Bass
ÂR00169	The Volcano Listening Project: data sonifications	Leif Karlstrom
ÂR00170	ContraPunctus	ContraPunctus
ÂR00171	Shatter	Carlin Lee
ÂR00173	Oiseau dans le miroir	Ari Folman-Cohen
ÂR00175	Matt White's Dolly	Matt White
ÂR00176	Songs For The World	Daniel Sky
ÂR00177	Whippersnap	EZRA
ÂR00178	Jolliff Plays Jones	Jacob Jolliff
ÂR00179	Double Course	New Acoustic Collective
ÂR00180	DNA	Terence Collie
ÂR00181	Bye Design	Chris van Voorst van Beest
ÂR00182	Phoenix	Rob Cope
ÂR00183	Church Lane	Jack Pearce
ÂR00184	Her Bright Smile Haunts Me Still	Sophie Wellington
ÂR00185	Abandon	Alex Chang
ÂR00186	Signal	Alex Chang
ÂR00187	Idea Guys	Mr Sun
ÂR00188	Tessere	Alla Boara
ÂR00189	Nothing Is Ordinary	Elena Moon Park
ÂR00190	Little Storms	Ethan Setiawan
ÂR00191	The Devil Invites You To Dance	Tara Minton
ÂR00192	The Morning Dark	Hayden Stern
ÂR00193	Slide Vibes	Paolo Ercoli
ÂR00194	Touzle Your Kurchy	Frank London (feat. Loisaida Fife & Drum Corps)
ÂR00195	Boundless Ways To Admire The Moon	Mathias Kunzli
ÂR00196	Routes of Evanescence: Music for Solo Violin and Violin +1 By American Women Composers	Ariana Kim
