= Arbel (name) =

Arbel (Hebrew: אַרְבֵּל) can be a feminine given name or a surname. Notable people with the name include:

== Given name ==
- Arbel Siman Tov (died 2023), victim killed in the 7 October 2023 attacks
- Arbel Yehoud (born 1995), Israeli abductee in the 7 October 2023 attacks

== Surname ==
- Beno Arbel, Israeli mathematician and historian
- Chaya Arbel, Israeli composer
- Edna Arbel, Israeli lawyer
- Lucien Arbel, French draftsman and engineer
- Moshe Arbel, Israeli Haredi rabbi and politician
- Nir Arbel, creator of the Soulseek peer-to-peer file sharing app
- Omer Arbel, Canadian multidisciplinary artist
- Or Arbel, Israeli developer known for creating the "Yo" app
- Sivan Arbel, jazz composer
- Tal Arbel, professor of electrical engineering at McGill University
