= Sara Caswell =

American violinist

- Born: February 21, 1978 (age 48); Bloomington, Indiana, U.S.
- Genres: Jazz, classical, experimental
- Occupation: Musician
- Instruments: Violin, Hardanger fiddle
- Labels: Sunnyside, Arbors, Adhyâropa Records
- Website: www.saracaswell.com

Sara Caswell (born February 21, 1978) is an American violinist who has worked with 9 Horses, Esperanza Spalding, and David Krakauer.

== Career ==
Born into a musical family in Bloomington, Indiana, Caswell studied classical violin with Josef Gingold, but from an early age she became interested in jazz and learned from Indiana University professor David Baker, violinist John Blake Jr., and trumpeter Patrick Harbison.

After finishing her degrees at Indiana and the Manhattan School of Music, she moved to New York City in the early 2000s at the behest Skitch Henderson, conductor of The New York Pops. She formed a jazz quartet with guitarist Jesse Lewis, bassist Ike Sturm, and drummer Jared Schonig. She also led a group with her sister, vocalist Rachel Caswell. She has taught at the Manhattan School of Music and Berklee College of Music.

In 2010, Caswell began performing with Esperanza Spalding's Chamber Music Society, an ensemble featuring rhythm section and string trio, and was on tour promoting the Chamber Music Society recording when Spalding won the Grammy Award for Best New Artist. Her work on Roseanna Vitro's album, The Music of Randy Newman, was also nominated for a Grammy Award in 2011 in the Best Jazz Vocal Album category. She was named a Rising Star in the Critics' Poll at Down Beat magazine in 2013 and 2014, and she was chosen among the top jazz violinists in the Readers' Poll at JazzTimes magazine in 2011 and 2012.

In 2013, she founded the ensemble 9 Horses with mandolinist Joseph Brent and bassist Shawn Conley. Their debut album Perfectest Herald and follow-up EP Blood From A Stone were released on Sunnyside Records. Their 2021 release Omegah was released on 9 Horses' own label, Adhyâropa Records. The ensemble is active as clinicians, having been in residence at colleges across the United States, including Baldwin Wallace University, Ball State University, DePauw University, and Kenyon College.

Caswell is a 2018 GRAMMY Award nominee in the category of Best Improvised Jazz Solo.

Caswell plays a violin by Stefano Scarampella and a Hardanger d'amore made for her by Salve Håkedal in 2013.

== Discography ==
As leader

- First Song (Double-Time, 2000)
- But Beautiful (Arbors, 2005)
- Alive in the Singing Air, Caswell Sisters (Turtle Ridge, 2014)
- The Way to You (Anzi, 2023)

With 9 Horses

- Joe Brent & Sara Caswell (2013)
- Perfectest Herald (Sunnyside, 2015)
- Blood from a Stone (Sunnyside, 2019)
- Omegah (Adhyâropa, 2021)
- Strum (Adhyâropa, 2024)

With Skitch Henderson

- Swinging With Strings (Arbors, 2001)
- Legends (Arbors, 2003) with Bucky Pizzarelli

With Cynthia Sayer

- Attractions (2007)
- Joyride (2013)

With Roseanna Vitro

- The Music of Randy Newman (2011)
- Clarity: Music of Clare Fischer (2013)

With others

- Kishi Bashi, String Quartet Live! (Joyful Noise Recordings, 2015)
- Rachel Caswell, Some Other Time (2003)
- Krista Detor, Chocolate Paper Suites (2010)
- Jessica Elbert, Aniage (2006)
- Oran Etkin, Kelenia (2009)
- Alan Ferber, Music for Nonet and Strings: Chamber Songs (2010)
- Miho Hazama, Time River (Sunnyside, 2015)
- Monika Herzig, Melody Without Words (2000)
- JaLaLa, The Old Mercer Magic! (2009)
- Russ Kaplan, The Ulysses Cycle (Ropeadope, 2013)
- Lauren Kinhan, Circle in a Square (Dotted i, 2014)
- Billy Martin, Wandering (Amulet, 2013)
- Brad Mehldau, Finding Gabriel (Nonesuch 2019)
- Nadje Noordhuis, Nadje Noordhuis (2010)
- Bucky Pizzarelli, So Hard to Forget (2008)
- Ike Sturm, Jazz Mass (2008)
- Jack Wilkins, The Blue & Green Project (2011)
