= Sharon Geva =

Israeli historian specializing in Holocaust research

Sharon Geva (Hebrew: שרון גבע; born 1973 in Israel) is an Israeli historian. She is an associate professor at Kibbutzim College in Tel Aviv, where she also heads the Department of History. She specializes in women's and gender history. Her research focuses on the history of women during the Holocaust, Israeli society's perceptions of the Holocaust, and the history of women in Israel, particularly the experiences of female Holocaust survivors.

== Education ==
Sharon Geva earned her bachelor's degree in history and the Multidisciplinary Program in the Humanities at Tel Aviv University, graduating cum laude. She received her master's degree from Tel Aviv University's School of History, graduating summa cum laude. She completed her Ph.D. at the university's School of Jewish Studies in 2007, under the supervision of Prof. Anita Shapira and Prof. Hanna Naveh. Her dissertation was titled "Representations of Women in the Holocaust in the Israeli Public Discourse during the 1950’s and in the Eichmann Trial".

== Academic and professional career ==
Since completing her Ph.D., she has been teaching in the Department of History at Kibbutzim College. From 2007 to 2024, she was a teaching fellow in the Multidisciplinary Program in the Humanities and the NCJW Women and Gender Studies Program at Tel Aviv University. From 2011 to 2017, she coordinated a research group on Holocaust education at the Institute for Advanced Education at Kibbutzim College. The group's research was published in an edited volume.

In 2019, she was elected to the board of the Historical Society of Israel (HSI), the Israeli professional association for historical research, where she served until 2021. Since 2020, she has been the coordinator of the international forum “Women Recall the Holocaust” at the Arnold and Leona Finkler Institute for Holocaust Research, headed by Judy Baumel-Schwartz at Bar-Ilan University. Since 2026, she is a member of the Academic Committee of the International Institute for Holocaust Research at Yad Vashem.

From 2022 to 2024, she worked at the Ghetto Fighters’ House within the Yitzhak Katzenelson Museum, which collects and preserves key documents related to the Holocaust and Jewish resistance. In addition, from 2012 to 2019, she initiated and coordinated a history project titled “Returning Women to History,” in which students wrote articles about extraordinary women for the Hebrew Wikipedia.

Since 2024, Sharon Geva has served as head of the History Department at Kibbutzim College for Education, Arts, and Technology in Tel Aviv-Jaffa.

Sharon Geva regularly publishes articles in the Israeli daily newspaper Haʾaretz.

== Research Topics ==
Sharon Geva's research in contemporary history focuses on the gender history of the Holocaust, the role of women in postwar Israeli society, and the development of the culture of remembrance.

She has explored the Israeli Holocaust discourse on heroism from a gender-specific perspective and, through her research, has demonstrated that the concept of heroism should not be limited to armed struggle but should be understood more broadly. In her analyses of female resistance fighters in the Jewish ghettos and the role of female couriers (kashariyot) in the Jewish resistance, she developed new interpretive approaches that allow her to describe the significance of women in underground activities in a more nuanced way.

On the topic of the culture of remembrance, Geva, along with other researchers, challenged the thesis of a “collective silence” in the first decades following the founding of the State of Israel and demonstrated that Holocaust survivors—especially women—had a visible presence in Israeli society even in the early years. In several publications, she documents the survivors’ contribution to the establishment of Israeli culture of remembrance and Holocaust commemoration.

In a study of the Eichmann trial, Geva examined the perspectives of the women who appeared as witnesses and participants in various roles throughout the proceedings. This includes the participation of a woman in the Mossad unit tasked with capturing Eichmann, the contribution of female investigators from a special police unit (“Bureau 06”), as well as the work of stenographers and translators in the courtroom and the role of the secretary to defense attorney Robert Servatius. She also examined the role of the Warsaw Ghetto Uprising within the trial.

Another focus of Sharon Geva's work is the status of women in Israeli society in the 1950s, drawing methodologically on primary sources written by the women themselves. In this context, she concluded that the decades-long exclusion of women from pilot training in the Israeli Air Force was primarily based on gender-specific considerations. With regard to the role of mothers in the struggle to secure the release of hostages following Hamas’s 2023 terrorist attack on Israel, she analyzes from a historical perspective how the mothers’ protest was incorporated into political discourse and utilized to support state narratives.

== Awards ==
Geva has received several fellowships and research awards, including the Nathan Rotenstreich Fellowship awarded by the Council for Higher Education, an award from Yad Vashem, and a research award from the Hadassah-Brandeis Institute at Brandeis University.

Her book, To the Unknown Sister: Holocaust Heroines in Israeli Society, received the 2011 Mordechai Ish Shalom Prize from the Yad Itzhak Ben-Zvi Institute in Jerusalem.

== Books ==
- Zivia Lubetkin and Yitzhak (Antek) Zuckerman: A Double Biography. Hakibbutz Hameuchad, Yad Tabenkin, and the House of Ghetto Fighters, Israel 2023, ISBN 978-965-282-130-0.
- Women in the State of Israel: The Early Years. Magnes Press, Jerusalem 2020, ISBN 978-965-7008-82-9.
- To the Unknown Sister: Holocaust Heroines in Israeli Society. Tel Aviv: Hakibbutz Hameuchad, 2010, ISBN 978-965-02-0576-8.
- (Ed.): Lessons of the Holocaust: A Humanistic Pedagogical Perspective. Hakibbutz Hameuchad, HaKibbutzim Seminar & Mofet Institute 2017, ISBN 978-9650208349.

== Articles (selection) ==
- LaIsha as a Co-Creator of Israeli Shoah Remembrance: The Case of a Beauty Queen. In Miri Freilich (ed.): The Bush That Did Not Burn. Shoah Survivors in Israel. Friedrich Ebert Foundation and Beit Berl Academic College 2012, pp. 148–163, ISBN 978-3864983009.
- Young Woman, Daughter, Mother: Female Soldiers Killed in Battle during Israel’s War of Independence (1947–1949). In: Middle Eastern Studies 60, No. 6, 2024, pp. 1000–1012.
- Zivia Lubetkin: Her Public Story, Her Private Story. In: Lori R. Weintrob; Judith Tydor Baumel-Schwartz (eds.): Heroines of the Holocaust: Reframing Resistance and Courage in Genocide. Routledge, London 2024, pp.273–283, ISBN 978-1040257623.
- From a Holocaust Survivors Initiative to a Ministry of Education: Project: Fredka Mazia and the First Israeli Youth Journeys to Poland 1965–1966. In: Holocaust and Genocide Studies 37, No. 1, 2023, pp.140–153.
- Ghetto Fighters, Mothers, Documenters, Female Holocaust Survivors in Israel. In: Contributions to the History of Nazi Persecution No. 3, 2022, pp.116–129, DOI:10.5771/9783835349230-116.
- With and Despite the Burden of the Past: 1946 in the Life Story of Zivia Lubetkin. In: Moreshet Journal for the Study of the Holocaust and Antisemitism No. 14, 2017, pp.220–259, ISBN 978-1885881526.
- To Collect the Tears of the Jewish People: The Story of Miriam Novitch. In: Holocaust Studies No. 21 (1–2), 2015, pp.73–92. [27]
- Wife, Lover, Woman: The Image of Hansi Brand in Israeli Public Discourse. In: Nashim, A Journal of Jewish Women's Studies & Gender Issues No. 27 (1), 2014, pp.97–119, ISSN 0793-8934.
