= The Woodsheep =

American indie folk rock band

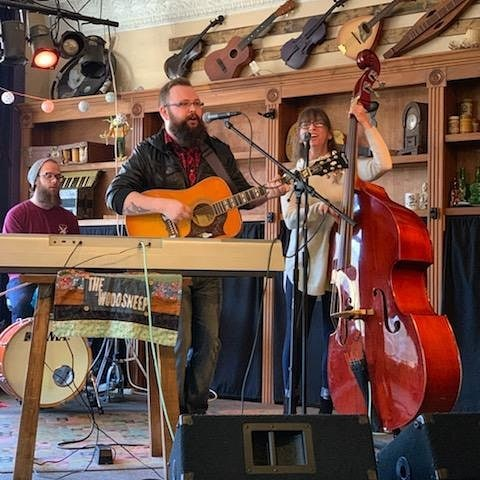
- The Woodsheep performing in November 2019

Background information
- Origin: Morehead, Kentucky, U.S.
- Years active: 2015–present
- Members: Andrew Preston; Melissa Caskey; Matt Holleran
- Website: www.apharbormusic.com

The Woodsheep is an American indie folk rock band from Morehead, Kentucky, United States. The band features Andrew Preston (vocals, piano, banjo, and guitar), Matt Holleran (drums, percussion), and Melissa Caskey (vocals and upright bass).

In 2016, the band released their first studio album, Watching Mars. Their second studio album, Sleeping Under Stars, was released in May 2018, along with an international record release tour. As of 2020, the band is on hiatus, though all three members are actively collaborating under Preston's new project, A.p. Harbor.

== History ==
=== 2015–2016: Formation ===
The Woodsheep was originally founded by Andrew Preston and Austin Tackett in 2015. The two met in college at Morehead State University. After years of self-producing anti-folk records, Preston, native to Van Lear, Kentucky, was featured by The International Bluegrass Music Association for his song, "The Mountain Wayfarers" as part of the international songwriting showcase in 2015.

In March 2015, the duet began working on cover songs for a college open mic night. Almost immediately, the duo began performing through the region. Shortly thereafter, they began to expand their folk roots to include experimental, blues, jazz, and electronic elements. The initial recordings were made with a Blue Yeti USB microphone at odd hours of the morning and in between classes in a small practice room at the university. On a whim, Preston hired classmates Matt Holleran and Melissa Caskey to record bass and drums for the record. After performing a few small shows as a quartet, they were added to the official lineup.

Watching Mars, their debut album, was completed in full on Preston's laptop. They recruited Jesse Wells to master the record at The Kentucky Center for Traditional Music, and quickly released the record on June 2, 2016.

=== 2016–2017: Watching Mars ===
After releasing Watching Mars, The Woodsheep toured through the region, performing at venues around Appalachia as the original acoustic duet, aside from a few electric shows that included Caskey and Holleran. In April 2016, they joined with frontwoman of Pearl and the Beard, Jocelyn Mackenzie, for another show for suicide awareness organization, Active Minds. They began collecting show dates, leading to an impressive list of over 150 North American tour dates in their first year. Their first single, "Live Simply" made its way to independent radio across the United States.

After accruing a small fanbase in various major cities throughout south-eastern Appalachia, The Woodsheep completed an east-coast tour throughout 2017, including popular venues like Sidewalk Cafe in New York City and The Purple Fiddle in Thomas, WV. They also announced a follow-up record to Watching Mars to be released later in the year. In July 2017, they toured The People's Republic of China to promote Appalachian music.

2017–2018: Sleeping Under Stars

Originally citing a release date of December 2017, the band scrapped many of their original ideas. Preston recorded, engineered, and produced the entire album at the Kentucky Center for Traditional Music's studio. The entire rhythm section of the new album was recorded live in a single day.

The band announced the release of the new album, Sleeping Under Stars, for May 2018 after a successful fundraising campaign. The album included the primary quartet, as well as a slew of other musicians.

On May 11, 2018, Sleeping Under Stars was released to the public, followed by an international tour through China, Ireland, and The U.K.

2019: Reformation and Old Time Pigeon

With the increasing focus on Preston's productions, Tackett's departure in August 2018, and the inclusion of a wide array of touring musicians, the band's sound began to shift. They released an EP in January 2019, Numbers On Lemons, to showcase the new sound and revisit old favorites from past tours. To cap off the year and pay tribute to their old-time roots, The Woodsheep, with Mary Morris and Wyatt Smith credited as members alongside Preston, Holleran, and Caskey, self-recorded a large collection of folk songs dubbed Old Time Pigeon. The album released for streaming on October 17, 2019, with the official release on October 20, 2019.

2020: A.p. Harbor and Hiatus

As of 2020, Preston announced that The Woodsheep would be on hiatus as he and Caskey shift focus to other projects. Though the band will still tour, Preston has re-branded himself under the pseudonym/band name A.p. Harbor and placed The Woodsheep under the umbrella of his A.p. Harbor project, citing that it will remain a collaborative effort between himself, Caskey, and Holleran and their endeavors in Appalachian-influenced music. A new website absorbed the original The Woodsheep homepage and differentiated the retro-influenced Woodsheep sound with the antifolk and pop theatrics of Preston's original songwriting. Along with guitarist Michael Jarvi, Caskey, Holleran, Smith, and Morris, who worked previously with The Woodsheep, join the A.p. Harbor lineup. Preston announced during a Facebook live-stream that a large-scale project will re-work his original material from The Woodsheep and old solo recordings as a debut for the new act.

== Discography ==
=== Albums ===
Year	Details
2016	Watching Mars: Released: June 2, 2016; Label: Independent
2018	Sleeping Under Stars: Released: May 11, 2018; Label: Independent
2019	Numbers On Lemons EP: Released: January 26, 2019; Label: Independent
2019	Old Time Pigeon: Released: September 20, 2019; Label: Independent

=== Singles ===
Year	Title	Album
2016	"Live Simply"	Watching Mars
2017	"Perspective of a Winter Leaf"	Single
2018	"Lost"	Sleeping Under Stars
2018	"Same Old Love Songs"	Sleeping Under Stars
2019	"The Left Cat"	Numbers On Lemons
2019	"As I Roved Out"	Old Time Pigeon
2019	"Sherburne"	Old Time Pigeon
