= John Hadfield =

John Hadfield may refer to:

- John Hadfield (writer) (1907-1999), English writer and publisher
- John Hadfield (musician), American jazz drummer and composer
