= Jesse Fischer =

New York-based nationally-recognized musician, producer, and engineer

- Born: Jesse Alexander Fischer
- Genres: Jazz; soul; electronic
- Occupations: Musician, multi-instrumentalist, songwriter, producer, recording engineer
- Instruments: Piano, keyboards
- Member of: AJOYO
- Website: jessefischer.com

Jesse Alexander Fischer is a pianist, keyboardist, composer, and producer. He currently lives in Brooklyn, New York. His playing draws on aspects of jazz, R&B, electronic music, and hip-hop, and incorporates both his Jewish heritage and the influences of the African diaspora. He’s been a recipient of multiple grants from South Arts Jazz Tour, and received the ASCAP Plus Award three times.

== Discography ==
=== As leader ===
- Flipped (Soul Cycle Music, 2010)
- Homebrew (Soul Cycle Music, 2011)
- Retro Future (ObliqSound, 2012)
- Day Dreamer (Ropeadope, 2015)
- Flipped II (Soul Cycle Music, 2018)
- Cross Currents EP (Soul Cycle Music, 2019)
- Resilience (Soul Cycle Music, 2020)
- Resilience (Recharged) EP (Soul Cycle Music, 2023)

=== with Sly5thAve ===
- Vein Melter (Tru Thoughts, 2015)

=== with AJOYO ===
- War Chant (Shems Records, 2020)

=== As a sideman ===
- Modus - Intersection (Optical Sounds, 2004)
- Stephanie Rooker - Tellin You Right Now (RookLove Productions, 2008)
- Tanya Morgan - Brooklynati (Interdependent Media, 2009)
- Anthony Hamilton - Back To Love (RCA, 2011)
- Monet - Lifesize Mirror (Purpose, 2011)
- Lakecia Bejamin - Retox (Motéma, 2012)
- John Robinson and PVD - Modern Vintage (Brick Records, 2014)
- Rachel Eckroth - Let Go (Virgo Sun Records, 2014)
- Pat Van Dyke - Right On Time (Jakarta Records, 2015)
- Rat Habitat. - Guns That Shoot Bubbles (Hot Record Société, 2015)
- Gretchen Parlato - The Gretchen Parlato Supreme Collection (Core Port, 2015)
- Barclay Crenshaw - Barclay Crenshaw (Stx&Brx, 2017)
- Sly5thAve - The Invisible Man: An Orchestral Tribute to Dr. Dre (Tru Thoughts, 2017)
- Becca Stevens - Wonderbloom (Core Port, 2020)
- Morgan Guerin - The Saga III (2020)
- NOBA - “Tell Me” (2021)
- Jordan Peters - Dreams (2021)
- Sarah Elizabeth Charles - Blank Canvas (Stretch Music/Ropeadope, 2022)
- Michael Feinberg - Crystalize (Fresh Sound Records, 2023)
- Nadia Washington - Hope Resurgence (NLW Records, 2023)
- Pat Van Dyke - Falls to Pieces (Cotter Records, 2023)

=== As producer ===
- Andre Henry - Insomnia EP (2010)
- Monet - Lifesize Mirror (Purpose, 2011)
- Laura Izibor - The Brooklyn Sessions, Vol. 1 (Atlantic Records, 2012)
- Koko Jones - Who’s That Lady? (Motéma, 2014)
- Brenda Nicole Moorer - For Lovers & Believers EP (2014)
- Rachel Eckroth - Let Go (Virgo Sun Records, 2014)
- Edgewood Agents - Edgewood (Atlanta records, 2016)
- Brenda Nicole Moorer - Brand New Heart (P-Vine Records, 2017)
- Elise Testone - This Is Love (2019)
- C R O W N - Unlearning (2020)
- The Basin - Transmissions (2020)
- AJOYO - War Chant (Shems Records, 2020)
- Sarah Elizabeth Charles - Blank Canvas (Stretch Music/Ropeadope, 2022)
- Nadia Washington - Hope Resurgence (NLW Records, 2023)

=== As engineer ===
- Andre Henry - Insomnia EP (2010)
- manuaLs - MID ONE (2012)
- Rachel Eckroth - Let Go (Virgo Sun Records, 2014)
- Sarah Elizabeth Charles - Free Of Form (Core Port, 2017)
- Brenda Nicole Moorer - Brand New Heart (P-Vine Records, 2017)
- BIGYUKI - Reaching for Chiron (2018)
- Justin Brown - NYEUSI (Biophilia, 2018)
- Sanah Kadoura - Hawk Eyes (2018)
- Elise Testone - This Is Love (2019)
- BIGYUKI - 2099 (2020)
- Jordan Peters - Dreams (2021)
