= Jostein Gulbrandsen =

- Born: 19 October 1976 (age 49); Namsos Municipality, Nord-Trøndelag
- Origin: Norway
- Genres: Jazz
- Occupations: Musician and composer
- Instrument: Guitar
- Label: New Talent
- Website: www.jostein-g.com

Jostein Gulbrandsen (born 19 October 1976) is a US-based Norwegian guitarist and composer.

== Biography ==
Gulbrandsen was born in Namsos Municipality. Attracted to music from an early age, he picked up the guitar at 9. After enrolling in the performing arts program at Nauma Highschool, he started studying jazz and classical guitar. In 1997 he moved to Kristiansand to attend Agder College of Music.

After two years he decided to move to the US to continue his studies at University of North Texas, under the guidance of Fred Hamilton and Lynn Seaton. In 2001 he moved to New York City to attend Manhattan School of Music, where he studied with Chris Rosenberg, Dave Liebman, Garry Dial and Phil Markowtiz. He finished his Master’s Degree in 2003 and has since the lived in New York, working as a professional musician, covering many styles of music. He is the leader of the Jostein Gulbrandsen Quartet including with Jon Irabagon, Eivind Opsvik and Jeff Davis releasing the album Twelve (2007), and Jostein Gulbrandsen Trio including with bassist Ike Sturm and drummer Ronen Itzik releasing the album Release of Tension (2012). He is also a part of the Nate Smith Quartet, Randal and the Matt Grason project, and the Gulbrandsen/Yonezawa Duo, performing at venues like Smoke, Detour, B.B Kings Blues Bar, Kavehaz, Scandinavia House, Blues Alley and Hard Rock Cafe. He has performed for the Norwegian Royal family and appeared both on national and public television both in Norway and the US, and has performed in many different countries including Scotland, England, and Japan.

== Discography ==
=== Solo albums ===
Jostein Gulbrandsen Quartet

- 2007: Twelve (New Talent)

Jostein Gulbrandsen Trio

- 2011: Release Of Tension (Self Release)

=== Collaborations ===
With Mari Tochi

- 2009: Aligato (Cd Baby.Com/Indys)

With Nathaniel Smith Quartet

- 2010: Nathaniel Smith Quartet (Fresh Sound New Talent)
