= Kalle Kalima =

Finnish jazz guitarist and improvisational musician

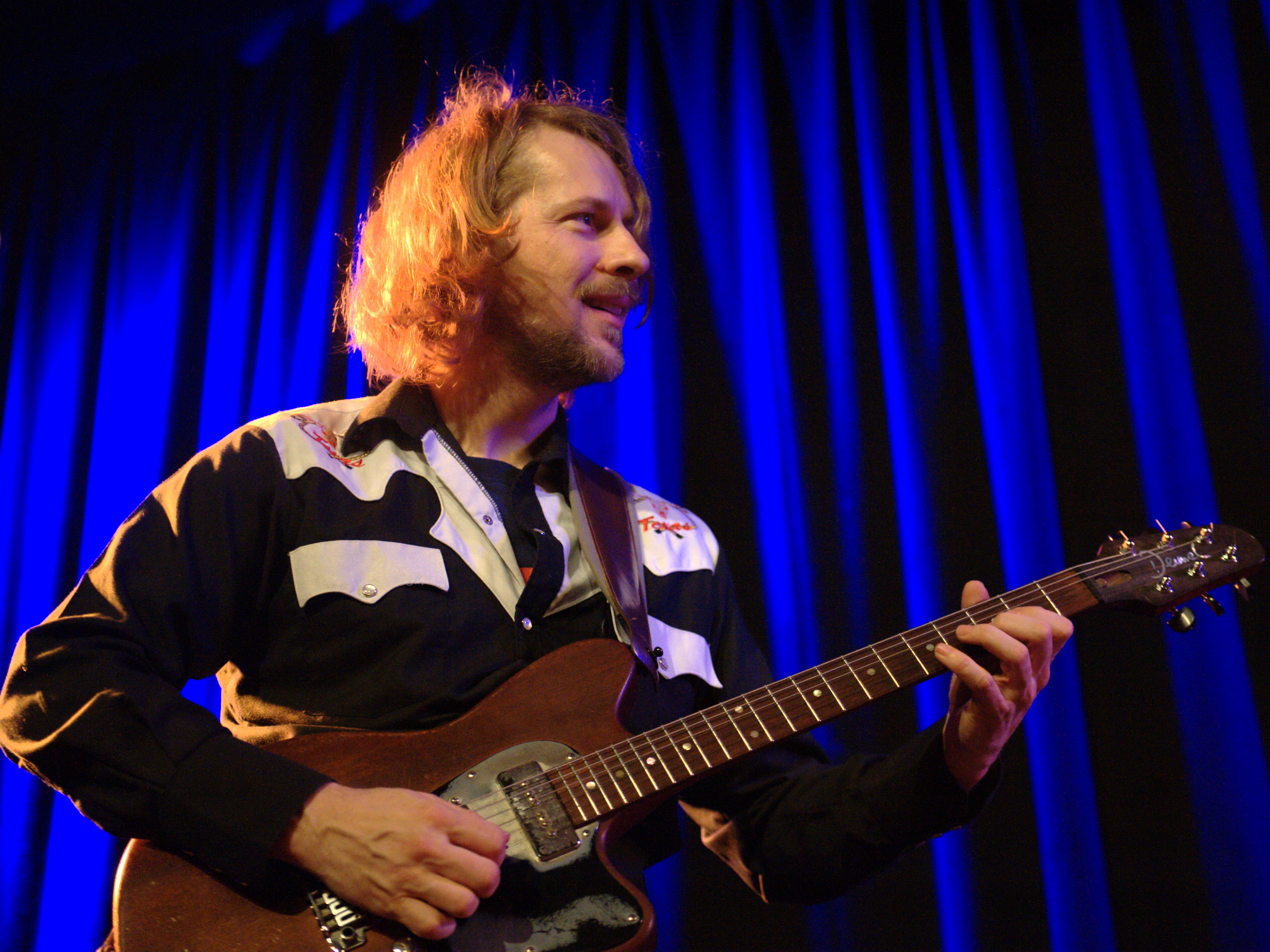
Kalima in concert 2016.

Kalle Kalima (born 29 December 1973 in Helsinki, Finland) is a Finnish jazz guitarist and improvisational musician.

== Biography ==
Kalima got piano lessons as a child for five years before switching to the guitar at age 11. He studied at the Sibelius Academy in Helsinki with Raoul Björkenheim and at the Hochschule für Musik "Hanns Eisler" in Berlin with John Schröder. He then worked with such musicians as trumpeter Tomasz Stańko, saxophonist Juhani Aaltonen, pianist Heikki Sarmanto, bassist Sirone, Teppo Hauta-Aho, Carlos Bica and Ed Schuller, guitarist Marc Ducret, composer Simon Stockhausen, singer Linda Sharrock and the Finnish musician Jimi Tenor.

== Musical projects ==
Kalima leads several of his own bands like the trio Klima Kalima (with bassist Oliver Potratz and drummer Oliver Steidle) is rooted in modern jazz and has recorded six albums (up to 2025), mostly with compositions by Kalima. The band received the 2008 New Mannheim Jazz Prize in Mannheim.

Momentum Impakto (with saxophonist Daniel Erdmann and John Schröder as drummer) was founded around 1998 in Berlin. The group occurs mostly in Germany and has recorded two albums, Haw Haw 1999 and Hyvä Bändi Livenä 2004. With the Soi Ensemble (with Riikka Lampinen, cello, Mikko Helevä, organ, Mongo Aaltonen, drums) Kalima performs songs that he composed after texts by Essi Kalima. The singers included Johanna Iivanainen, Eeppi Ursin and Merzi Rajala. The debut album of the group was released in 2003.

The trio Jazz Parasites led by Kalima, comprises the bassist Ed Schuller and the drummer Ernst Bier in addition to Kalima. His latest band (2018) is K 18, a group that plays free improvisational music with acoustic and electric instruments.

== Discography ==
=== Solo albums ===
- 2000: Hippycone (Abovoice), with Kalle Kalima Trio (Lasse Lindgren, Mika Kallio) feat. Marc Ducret
- 2004: Kalle Kalima; Helsinki on My Mind (Village), feat. Oliver Potratz and Olli Steidle
- 2007: Chasing Yellow (Enja), feat. Oliver Potratz and Olli Steidle
- 2009: Iris in Trance (La Lune), with Kalle Kalima Pentasonic (solo)
- 2010: Loru (Enja), feat. Oliver Potratz and Olli Steidle
- 2013: Finn Noir (Enja/Yellowbird), feat. Oliver Potratz and Olli Steidle
- 2016: High Noon (ACT), feat. Greg Cohen and Max Andrzejewski
- 2019: Flying Like Eagles (ACT), feat. Knut Reiersrud, Phil Donkin and Jim Black
- 2025: Voyager Blues (TYXart), feat. Oliver Potratz and Olli Steidle

=== Collaborations ===
With Monumentum Impakto (Daniel Erdmann, John Schröder)

- 1999: Haw Haw (Jazz4Ever Records)
- 2004: Hyvä Bändi Livenä (Konnex Records)

With Nuijamiehet (Lasse Lindgrén, Mika Kallio, Mikko Innanen)

- 2000: Nuijamiehet (Fiasko Records)

With Soi (Riikka Lampinen, Mikko Helevä, Mongo Aaltonen)

- 2002: Pehmeä (Impala)
- 2006: Koiperhonen (Texicalli Records)

With Johnny La Marama (Chris Dahlgren, Eric Schaefer)

- 2003: Johnny La Marama (meta records)
- 2006: ...Fire! (Traumton Records)
- 2009: Bicycle Revolution (Traumton Records)
- 2014: Il Purgatorio (Traumton Records)

With Jazz Parasites

- 2004: Very Early (Phonector)

With Bica, Klammer, Kalima

- 2004: A Chama do Sol (Nabel)

With UNKL (Gary Hoopengardner, Josh Yellon, Sebastian Merk)

- 2005: UNKL (Konnex Records)

With Baby Bonk

- 2005: Sagt Die Wahrheit (Konnex Records)
- 2008: Mama (NRW Records)

with Sonar Kollektiv Orchester

- 2008: Guaranteed Niceness (Sonar Kollektiv)

With Kalle Kalima & K-18 (Mikko Innanen, Teppo Hauta-aho, Veli Kujala)

- 2009: Some Kubricks of Blood (TUM Records)
- 2012: Out To Lynch (TUM Records)
- 2014: Buñel De Jour (TUM Records)

With Kari Heinilä

- 2010: Stilleben (Abovoice)

With Achim Kaufmann

- 2024: Ilmonique (TYXart)

With Kuu! (Christian Lillinger, Frank Möbus)

- 2013: Sex Gegen Essen (Shoebill Music)

With TUMO

- 2013: And It Happened... (TUM Records), feat. Henrik Otto Donner
- 2013: Occupy The World (TUM Records), feat. Wadada Leo Smith

With Tenors of Kalma (Jimi Tenor, Joonas Riipa)

- 2015: Electric Willow (Enja/Yellowbird)

With Z-Country Paradise (Christian Marien, Frank Gratkowski, Oliver Potratz, Yelena Kuljic)

- 2015: Z-Country Paradise (Z-Paradise Records)
- 2018: Live in Lisbon (Leo Records)

With Matthias Bröde's Oh!KesterOsloer3 (John Schröder, trio)

- 2017: Where Is Wedding? (Unit Records)

With Oliwood (Frank Gratkowski, Oliver Steidle)

- 2017: Euphoria (Yellowbird)
