= Joseph Brent =

- Born: April 6, 1976 (age 50); Queens, New York
- Genres: Classical, folk, jazz, bluegrass, experimental
- Instruments: Mandolin, guitar, violin
- Labels: Adhyâropa Records, Sunnyside Records, Pentatone Records, Vienna Modern Masters, orlando records
- Website: josephbrent.com

Joseph Frederick Brent (born April 6, 1976) is an American composer, mandolinist, multi-instrumentalist, and teacher. He is known for his performances and arrangements of rock and indie songs, as well as his original compositions with the ensemble 9 Horses. He taught classical mandolin at Mannes College and currently teaches at Bard College.

Brent attended the Berklee College of Music, and studied the mandolin under Carlo Aonzo in Savona, Italy. He also received instruction from Barry Mitterhoff and Adam Steffey.

In addition to his teaching responsibilities, Brent is active as a sideman in several rock, jazz, bluegrass, and folk ensembles, most notably with Regina Spektor, Jewel, Kishi Bashi, Gary Smulyan, and various artists centered on the Brooklyn folk music scene.

Brent also records and has performed with symphony orchestras such as the Seattle Symphony, San Francisco Symphony, Chicago Symphony, International Contemporary Ensemble, nunc, and the New World Symphony.

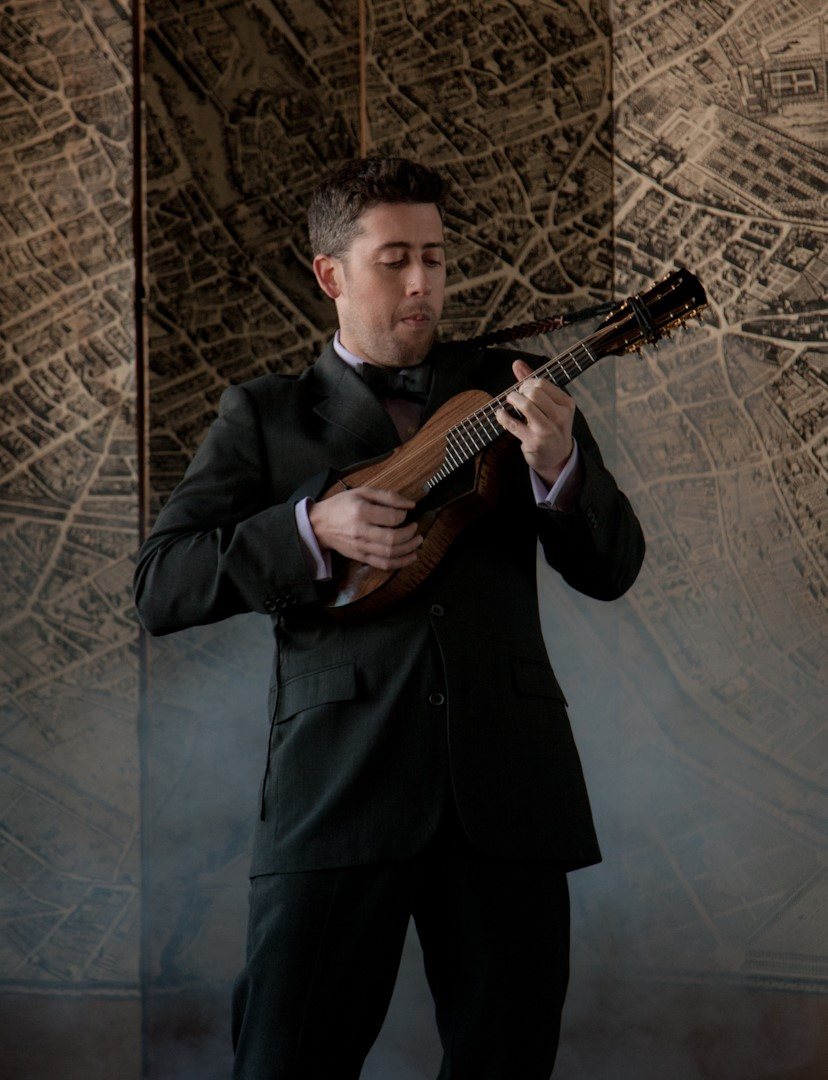
Joseph Brent in 2013 with his custom-made 10-string mandolin, named Kumi.

On October 16, 2015, Brent's improvising ensemble 9 Horses, featuring violinist Sara Caswell and bassist Shawn Conley released their debut album Perfectest Herald on Sunnyside Records, and in 2016 were the winners of the 21CM LAUNCH: Emerging Artists Competition.

In 2021 Brent founded Adhyâropa Records. In addition to releasing Omegah and subsequent material by 9 Horses and its associated members, Adhyâropa has also released albums by Sam Sadigursky, Darol Anger, Lenny Pickett, and many others.

Brent has published two books of mandolin pedagogy, Scales and Arpeggios for Mandolin and Orchestral and Chamber Excerpts for Mandolin, and his book of transcriptions of the lute music of John Dowland for two mandolins, conceived with Alon Sariel, was published in 2015 by paladino music.

== Customized instruments ==
In 2008, Brent collaborated with Nova Scotia-based luthier Brian Dean to design a grand concert mandolin he named 'Pähkinä', which is Finnish for 'nut', a reference to the walnut top of the instrument. Among the instrument's many distinctive features are the walnut/maple/spruce wood combination, a zero fret, a semi-lute construction with minimal bracing, a built-in tone guard with a sound pressure relief hole cut into the back, and ornate f-holes which reach around the sides of the instrument. Dean has since built a 10-string version of this model nicknamed 'Kumí', which is currently Brent's primary acoustic instrument. In 2016, Vermont-based luthier Adam Buchwald built him a 5-string, fanned fret electric mandolin.

== Discography ==
=== Solo ===
- Point of Departure (2007)
- Nocturnes and Caprices by David Loeb (Vienna Modern Masters) (2011)
- solo. EP (2011)
- An Englishman In New York (2013) with Alon Sariel

=== With 9 Horses ===
- Joe Brent & Sara Caswell EP (2013)
- Perfectest Herald (2015)
- Blood From A Stone EP (2019)
- Omegah (2021)
- Strum (2024)
- Strumming Music EP (2024)

=== With others ===
Year	Artist	Album	Description
1997	Rob Giles	Straight Down a Crooked Road	violin, string arrangements
2002	Tom Jones & Harvey Schmidt	Roadside (original cast recording)	mandolin, violin, guitar, banjo
2003	Eric Stuart Band	BombShellShocked	violin
2006	Jacques Brel is Alive and Well and Living in Paris	2006 off-Broadway revival cast recording	mandolin, violin
2008	Lindsay Katt	Picking Out Boxes	violin
2010	Regina Spektor	Live In London	violin
2010	Joseph Stein & Stan Daniels	Enter Laughing (Original Cast Recording)	violin
2012	Bryan Dunn	Sweetheart of the Music Hall	mandolin, vocals
2012	Miller & Tysen	Fugitive Songs	mandolin, violin
2013	Kishi Bashi	7" Box Set	violin
2013	Erin McKeown	MANIFESTRA	violin, piano, string arrangements
2013	Kelli Rae Powell	Live at Jalopy	mandolin, violin
2013	Gary Smulyan	Bella Napoli	mandolin, violin
2014	Lauren Kinhan	Circle in a Square	violin
2015	Maxine Linehan	Beautiful Songs	mandolin, percussion, violin
2015	Andi Rae Healy	If You Want To Be My Man	mandolin
2015	King Radio	King Radio	mandolin, violin
2015	Kishi Bashi	String Quartet Live!	mandolin, violin
2015	Lina Orfanos	Mauthausen	mandolin
2016	Kishi Bashi	The Fourth Phase (Original Soundtrack)	violin
2018	Various Artists	I Only Listen to the Mountain Goats: All Hail West Texas	electric mandolin, string arrangements with Erin McKeown on 'Jenny'
2019	Richard Rodgers and Oscar Hammerstein	Oklahoma! (2019 Revival)	mandolin, guitar
2022	Lara Downes	Reflections: Scott Joplin Reconsidered	mandolin, vihuela
2023	James Moore	Desolation Pops	vocals
2024	Christopher Zuar	Exuberance	mandolin

== Books ==
- Scales and Arpeggios for Mandolin. Lulu Publishing. 2007.
- Orchestral and Chamber Excerpts for Mandolin. Lulu Publishing. 2007.
