= Drăgănești-Olt =

- Town
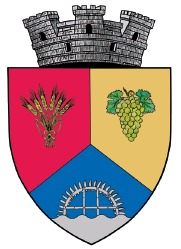
- Coat of arms

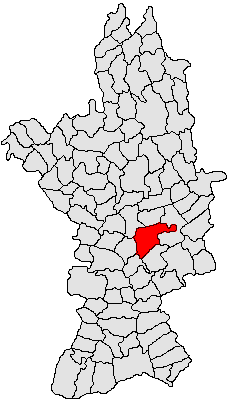
- Location in Olt County

- Location in Romania
- Coordinates: 44°10′11″N 24°31′48″E
- Country: Romania
- County: Olt

Government
  - Mayor (2024–2028): Marian-Viorel Tudorică (PNL)
- Area: 78.88 km^{2} (30.46 sq mi)
- Elevation: 68 m (223 ft)
- Highest elevation: 100 m (330 ft)
- Lowest elevation: 40 m (130 ft)
- Population (2021-12-01): 9,721
  - Density: 123.2/km^{2} (319.2/sq mi)
- Time zone: UTC+02:00 (EET)
  - Summer (DST): UTC+03:00 (EEST)
- Postal code: 235400
- Area code: (+40) 02 49
- Vehicle reg.: OT
- Website: draganesti-olt.ro

Drăgănești-Olt (Romanian pronunciation: [drəɡəˌneʃtʲ ˈolt]) is a town in Olt County, Muntenia, Romania. The first document mentioning it is from 1526. Drăgănești-Olt became a town in 1968. The town administers one village, Comani.

== Geography ==
The town is situated on the Wallachian Plain. It lies on the left bank of the river Olt, at an altitude of approximately 100 m (330 ft). It is located in the central part of Olt County, at a distance of 35 km (22 mi) from the county seat, Slatina, and 65 km (40 mi) north of Turnu Măgurele.

The town is crossed by county road DJ546, which meets national road DN6 a few miles to the south. The Drăgănești-Olt train station serves the CFR Line 900, which runs from Bucharest, 138 km (86 mi) to the east, to Timișoara and the border with Serbia to the west.

== Natives ==
- Cosmin Achim (born 1995), footballer
- Beno Arbel (1939–2013), Israeli mathematician
- Ileana Constantinescu (1929–2018), folk music singer
- Daniel Oprița (born 1981), footballer
- Constantin Tobescu (1893–1951), general of the Romanian Gendarmerie
