= Alon Sariel =

Israeli musician

Alon Sariel (Hebrew: אלון שריאל; born 11 May 1986 in Beersheba, Israel) is an Israeli mandolinist, lutenist and conductor.

== Early musical education ==
Alon Sariel was born in Beersheba, Israel, the youngest of five siblings. He started playing the mandolin at the age of eight as a student of Dora Bartik at the Beersheba Conservatory. Due to a sabbatical year of his father at the University of Caltech, Pasadena, Alon spent a year in Los Angeles with his family, where he was exposed to the Bluegrass mandolin style. Returning to Israel at the age of 13, he continued his musical education in the mandolin class of Lev Khaimovich at the Beersheba Conservatory, as well as music literature and theory with Mila Kosorovitzky, Gila Wolfson and Larisa Smoliar. For some years he also attended piano and percussion classes from Fania Eisenberg and Vadim Galil at the conservatory. At this stage, Sariel received a mandolin made by Arik Kerman, an instrument which would accompany him for almost 20 years.

== Musical higher education ==
In 2004, Sariel was accepted to Motti Shmitt's mandolin and violin class at the Jerusalem Academy of Music and Dance and later followed orchestra conducting studies with Evgeny Tsirlin. Following an invitation from Daniel Barenboim's West-Eastern Divan Orchestra, Sariel joined the orchestra on tours between 2007 and 2012, playing mandolin excerpts and following Maestro Barenboim's work.

Besides his formal studies, Sariel joined courses and masterclasses and received guidance from conductors Yoel Levi, Martyn Brabbins and Benjamin Zander, mandolinists Ugo Orlandi, Carlo Aonzo and Avi Avital, domrist Tamara Volskaya, violinists Sophie Gent and Ilan Gronich, lutenist Ophira Zakai and recorder player Corina Marti. Among his teachers in Jerusalem were Michael Melzer, David Shemer, Michael Wolpe, Zvi Avni, Menachem Zur and Menachem Wiesenberg.

By the time, Sariel graduated from the Jerusalem Academy of Music and Dance in 2009, he has won first prizes in every of the academy's competitions he was allowed to attend, including the competition for string instruments (2006), the chamber music competition (2007) and the conducting competition (2009).

Through the program Erasmus Mundus, Sariel was able to study at the Royal Conservatory of Brussels in 2008, where he started playing the lute under Philippe Malfeyt and continued studying orchestra conducting with Ronald Zollman. During that time Alon was invited by mandolinist Ralf Leenen to join his Antwerp based ensemble La Napolitaine on tour to Japan, together they performed in Tokyo and Kyoto among other cities.

Between 2010 and 2015 he was registered at the Hochschule für Musik, Theater und Medien Hannover with a major in lute under Hans-Michael Koch and conducting with Paul Weigold and later Martin Brauß. In some of these years he also participated at the Winter Akademie of the Hochschule für Künste in Bremen, and received guidance from Joachim Held (lute) and Margit Schultheiß (historical harp).

== Career ==
As a mandolin soloist, Sariel has performed with most of the Israeli orchestras, often as conductor as well. These include the Jerusalem Symphony, the Tel Aviv Soloists, the Haifa Symphony, the Israeli Sinfonieta and Israel Chamber Orchestra. Following several competitions won in the UK, Sariel was invited to perform with English orchestras. These include Airedale Symphony, London International Orchestra, Imaestri and The Orchestra of the City who commissioned for Sariel the Sinfonia Concertante for mandolin and strings "Nedudim" by Gilad Hochman (2014). This work was recorded by Sariel and the Kammerorchester Berlin for the label Neue Meister in 2016. As a continuo player Alon Sariel collaborated with ensembles such as Elbipolis Barockorchester Hamburg, KlangForum Heidelberg and Holland Baroque, to name a few.

In 2015 Sariel founded Concerto Foscari, an international ensemble playing historical instruments, to realize his innovative musical programs and ideas. At the same year he co-founded the quartet PRISMA, together with violist Dávid Budai, recorder player Elisabeth Champollion and violinist Franciska Anna Hajdu.

As a soloist or in different formations, Alon Sariel was seen on stages such as the Berliner Philharmonie, The Royal Albert Hall, BOZAR, the Glocke in Bremen and Laeiszhalle in Hamburg. He was guest at festivals such as the Tiroler Festspiele Erl, St Magnus Festival (Orkney Islands), the Carinthischer Sommer and Allegro Vivo (Austria), O/Modernt (Stockholm), York Early Music, Gezeitenkonzerte Ostfriesland, Montalbâne Festival for Medieval Music and the Biennale for New Music in Salzburg.

== Other works composed for Alon Sariel ==
- Fabrizio Giudice – Dialog for mandolin and guitar
- Michael Wolpe - Partita for mandolin solo
- Gilad Hochman - Two Episodes for mandolin solo
- Robert Schulz - „Holborne Reborn“ for flute, mandolin and cello; The Road to Mordor for mandolin guitar and harpsichord
- Peter Klatzow - Concerto for mandolin and chamber orchestra
- Thomas Hewitt Jones - „Panatheneia“ for singers and mixed ensemble
- Tomi Räisänen - “Inside a Mechanical Clock” for mandolin, guitar and harpsichord
- Antti Auvinen “Trio” for mandolin, guitar and harpsichord
- Menachem Zur - Concerto for mandolin, guitar, harpsichord with chamber orchestra
- Leonardo Coral – Ensueños

== Selected discography ==
- Plucked Bach, (Pentatone)
- Plucked Bach II (Pentatone)
- Plucked Bach III, (Pentatone)
- Vienna Mandolin Stories (Pentatone)
- Schubert’s Mandolin (Pentatone)
- Telemandolin (Berlin Classics)

with Concerto Foscari

- Live in Berlin (Neue Meister)

with Deutsches Kammerorchester Berlin

- Concert d'anniversaire

with Concerto Foscari

- Sharkiya (IMI) (Music for Plucked Instruments by Yehezkel Braun)

with Izhar Elias (guitar) and Michael Tsalka (harpsichord)

- Paisiello in Vienna (Brilliant Classics)

with Izhar Elias (period guitar) and Michael Tsalka (fortepiano)

- An Englishman in New York (Orlando Records)

with Joe Brent (mandolin)

- Sources

with Yaki Reuven (mandolin)
