= Thomas Martin (musician) =

American-born musician and luthier

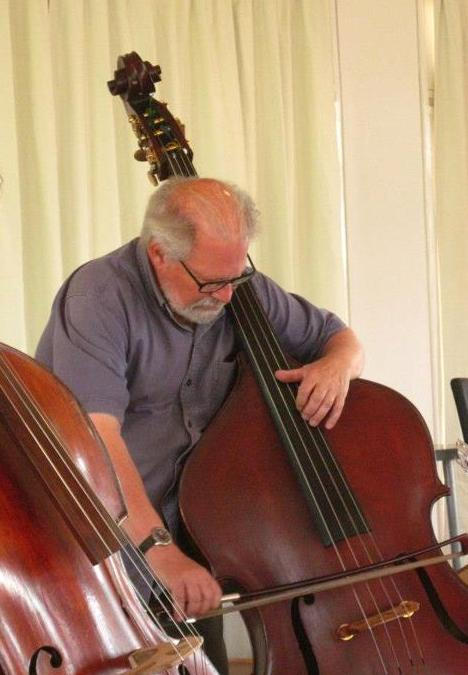

Background information
- Born: July 22, 1940 (age 85); Cincinnati, Ohio, U.S.
- Instrument: Double-bassists

Thomas Martin (born July 22, 1940) is an American-born musician and luthier, known for playing the double bass. He was twice awarded prizes for his recordings of Giovanni Bottesini's work, and he has been principal in many orchestras of importance, including the English Chamber Orchestra and the London Symphony Orchestra. Martin was formerly International Chair of Double Bass at Royal Birmingham Conservatoire and has been professor both at the Royal College of Music Guildhall School of Music and Drama and at the Royal Scottish Academy of Music in Glasgow.

== Beginnings and professional career ==
Martin studied in the United States under Harold Roberts, Oscar Zimmerman and Roger Scott. Both Zimmerman and Scott were main students of the Catalan virtuoso Antoni Torelli: Principal Bass of Barcelona's Teatro Liceo orchestra and later the Philadelphia Orchestra. Torello is well known for having introduced the French bowing technique in the United States. He was pupil Pedro Valls, who was in turn a pupil of José Roveda and Giovanni Bottesini. Martin has developed a great technique using the same kind of bow. As a conductor, he has studied with Sian Edwards in London and with Stephen Darlington in Oxford, and has also accomplished the first recording of Giovanni Bottesini's Messa da Requiem with the London Philharmonic Orchestra and its chorus. Martin has played with Israel Philharmonic Orchestra and the Buffalo Philharmonic. As principal bass, he has played with the Montreal Symphony Orchestra, the Academy of St Martin in the Fields, the English Chamber Orchestra, the City of Birmingham Symphony Orchestra, and latterly the London Symphony Orchestra. He has been principal bass with the Oxford Philomusica since its first season.

== Soloist ==
In recent years, Martin has been pursuing an ever-increasing interest in solo playing appearing in recitals and concertos with orchestras around the world. He has made a number of television and broadcast appearances presenting a wide variety of repertoire ranging from the baroque to the 20th century. He has played and recorded an extensive amount of the chamber music for his instrument, and recently completed a series of recordings of the music of Giovanni Bottesini, which have met with great critical acclaim. His recordings in the Bottesini series with Anthony Halstead were awarded “Gramophone Magazine Record of the Year” and his recording with the English Chamber Orchestra was chosen as the “Sunday Times Record of the Year”. During 2008, the celebrated series was re-released on Naxos. The collaborators of this achievement include the English Chamber Orchestra, the LSO, double bass virtuoso Franco Petracchi, pianist Christopher Oldfather and cellist Moray Welsh.

== Other activities ==
Both a double bass virtuoso and a double bass enthusiast and bibliophile, Martin is responsible for a large number of editions of music for his instrument, notably for Thodore Presser and International Music Company in the U.S. and G. Billaudot in France. As a teacher, Martin was, for many years, Senior Professor of double bass at London's Guildhall School of Music and is now a professor at the Royal College of Music in London and the Royal Scottish Academy of Music in Glasgow. He is in constant demand to give master classes internationally and is often asked to serve on International competition juries.
