= John Hadfield (musician) =

American jazz musician

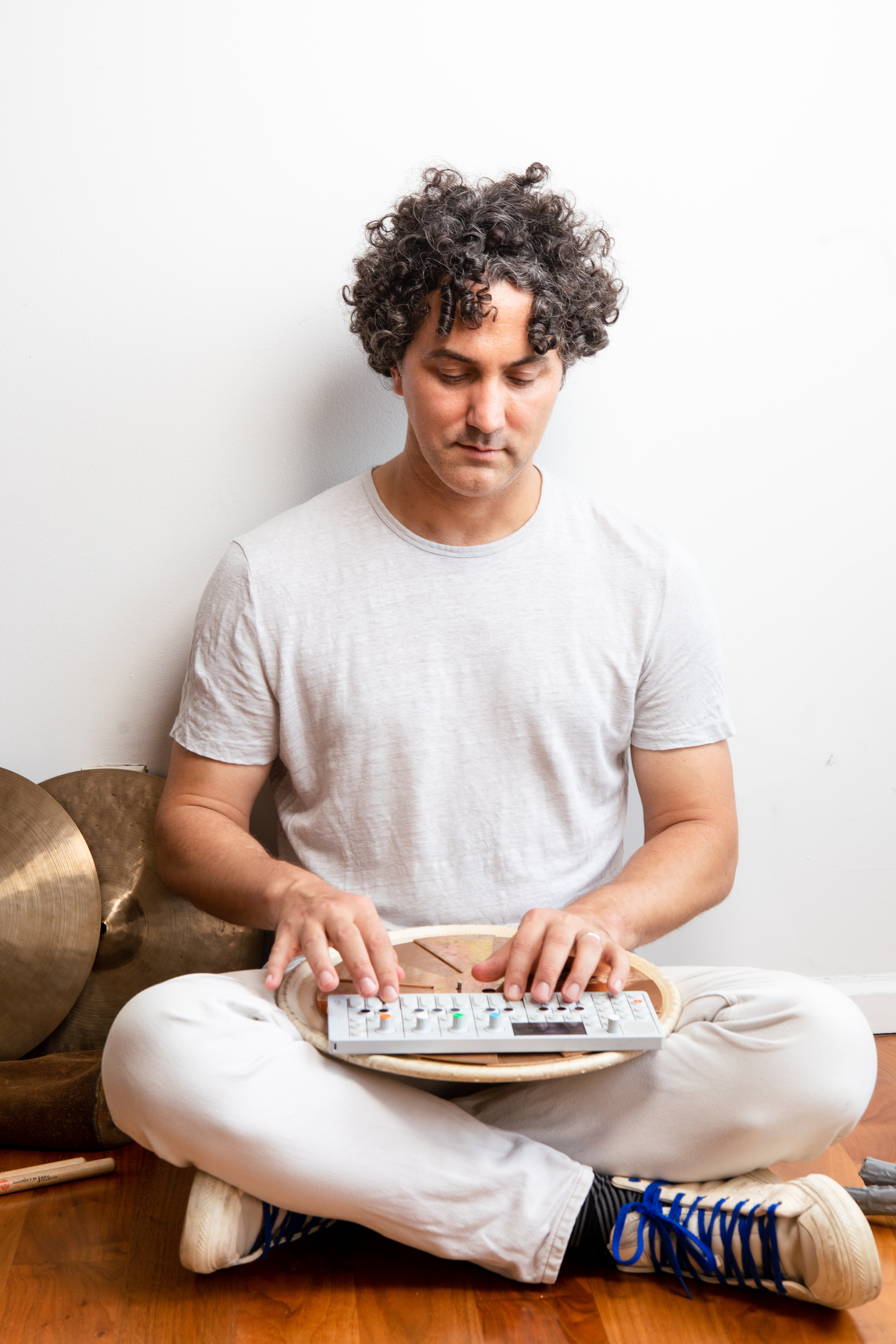

John Hadfield is an American jazz drummer, composer, and percussionist.

Hadfield was born and raised in Missouri. He studied music at University of Nevada, Las Vegas and the University of Missouri, Kansas City Conservatory, before moving to New York. He performs with a number of musicians and ensembles including Kinan Azmeh, Ron Blake, Rachel Eckroth, St. Vincent (musician), Petros Klampanis, Nguyên Lê, Yo-Yo Ma’s Silk Road Ensemble, Lenny Pickett, and Kenny Werner.

== Life and career ==
Born in Missouri, Hadfield began to play the drums as a child. He studied music as an undergraduate student at University of Nevada, Las Vegas before earning a Master’s degree at the University of Missouri, Kansas City Conservatory. He then settled in New York where he has been performing and composing for a variety of genres, in particular Jazz, world music, and classical and contemporary music. Hadfield currently teaches at NYU’s Jazz studies department.

Hadfield has performed with a number of musicians and ensembles around the world including Kinan Azmeh, Ron Blake, Rachel Eckroth, St. Vincent (musician), Petros Kampanis, Nguyên Lê, Yo-Yo Ma’s Silk Road Ensemble, Lenny Pickett, and Kenny Werner. Hadfield was described by Modern Drummer magazine in 2016 as having “created hybrid drumkit/percussion setups that ingeniously serve[] the music . . . His skillful sound-weaving choices create the illusion of a seamless multi-percussion section.”

Hadfield released many albums of his own compositions, including Speaking in Tongues (a duo with Rachel Eckroth - 2025) Drum of Stories (2023) John Hadfield’s Paris Quartet (2022), The Eye of Gordon (2008), and Displaced (2010).Paris Quartet, was hailed by one of the leading Belgian daily newspapers, Le Soir, as "very successful, the musicians are in perfect osmosis, the Rhodes developing its atmospheres, the sax its volutes, the percussion its rhythms, the base its counterpoints. Everything lands exactly at the right place. And the listener is happy."

Hadfield has composed for many projects, including Heard by Others, a duo with Lenny Pickett, For James, a collaboration with Ron Blake, Believers, a trio with Brad Shepik and Sam Minaie, the electronic group Earspeak with Boris Skalsky, as well as the feature-length documentary After Spring. In 2017, reviewing Petros Klampanis' Chroma, Downbeat wrote, "Drummer John Hadfield is an ideal purveyor of Klampanis’ vision. Using a hybrid kit of traditional drumkit pieces and mounted percussion, he spurs on the ensemble with sensitive, yet infectiously grooving layers." In 2021, reviewing the Believers’ album, All About Jazz wrote, “Hadfield's contributions belong among the more rhythmically engaging cuts of the spectrum. First ostinato-based, then loudly improvised, "Seven Crotales" unveils groovy bass lines and spacey guitar work which is elaborated on again later, throughout "Nomadic Days.” The same year, French Jazz website Citizen Jazz published a review of Hadfield’s single For James honoring James Baldwin, poetically noting that he “deployed a clever and joyful beat, . . . a dew of happiness.”

Hadfield has also been heard playing drum and percussion on various TV shows and movies, including Saturday Night Live, P.O.V (TV Series documentary), The Light in Her Eyes, and Chuck Jones: Memories of Childhood.

== Discography ==
As a leader or collectives:

- John Hadfield "Endless Trains" (2026) Adhyâropa Records
- John Hadfield "The Bells of Basal Sliding" (feat. Francesco Geminiani) EP (2026) Adhyâropa Records
- Rachel Eckroth & John Hadfield feat. Petros Klampanis "Olhos de Gato" Single (2025) Adhyâropa Records
- Lenny Pickett and John Hadfield “Heard by Others II” (2025) Adhyâropa Records
- Believers with Brad Shepik, Sam Minaie and John Hadfield “Hard Believer” (2025) Shifting Paradigm Records
- Rachel Eckroth & John Hadfield "Speaking in Tongues" (2025) Adhyâropa Records
- The Saints of Paris "Alone with the Moon" (feat. John Hadfield, Rachel Eckroth & Tim Lefebvre) (2024) Head Bitch Music
- Rachel Eckroth & John Hadfield "Saturn" Single (2024) Adhyâropa Records
- The Saints of Paris "Collage" (feat.Rachel Eckroth & John Hadfield) (2024) Head Bitch Music
- John Hadfield "Dêcollage" (feat. Francesco Geminiani) Single (2024) Palindrome 76 Records
- John Hadfield "Please Rate Your Experience" Single (2024) Palindrome 76 Records
- John Hadfield's Drum of Stories (2023) In A Circle Records
- John Hadfield’s Paris Quartet (2022) Outhere
- John Hadfield “For James” with Ron Blake (2021) Palindrome 76 Records
- Lenny Pickett and John Hadfield “Heard by Others” (2020) Orenda Records
- Earspeak "Eyes of Fire" (feat. Boris Skalsky, John Hadfield & Sky White Tiger) (2020) Earspeak Records
- Believers with Brad Shepik, Sam Minaie and John Hadfield “Believers” (2020) Orenda Records
- John Hadfield “Displaced” (2010) Palindrome 76 Records
- John Hadfield “The Eye of Gordon” (2008) Palindrome 76 Records

Appears on:

- Olga Amelchenko "Touching the Invisible" (2026) Edition Records
- Massimiliano Cignitti "Live in Rome" feat. Nguyên Lê, Grégoire Maret & John Hadfield (2026) Dodicilune
- The Court At Versailles "Acoustic Electronica" (2026) Handcrafted Records
- Petro Klampanis “Minor Dispute” Remaster featuring Gilad Hekselman John Hadfield & Jean-Michel Pilc (2026) Remaster PKMusik
- The Court At Versailles "A Walk" Single (2025) Handcrafted Records
- Ron Blake SCRATCH Band feat Reuben Rogers and John Hadfield (2025) 7tēn33 Productions
- Kinan Azmeh CityBand “Live in Berlin” (2025) Dreyer Gaido
- Brad Shepik "Human Activity: Dream of the Possible" (feat. Layale Chaker, Amino Belyamani, Sam Minaie & John Hadfield) (2024) Shifting Paradigm Records
- 9 Horses "STRUM" (2024) Adhyâropa Records
- Layale Chaker & Sarafand "Radio Afloat" (2024) In A Circle Records
- Dead Heart Bloom “Dream States" (2024)
- Carter Burwell "Drive-Away Dolls (Music from the Motion Picture)" (2024) Back Lot Music
- East of the River "Ija Mia" (2024)
- Akira Ishiguro “BON” (2023) SOMETHIN'COOL
- Mother Mother "Grief Chapter" (2023) Warner Music
- Céline Bonacina "Jump!" featuring Rachel Eckroth, Chris Jennings and John Hadfield (2023) Cristal Records
- Jayme Stone “Wreckage of the Fall” Single (2023)
- Cy Leo “Free Dimension” (2023) Sony Music HK
- Joy Dragland "Little by Little" Single (2023)
- Brian Landrus "Red List" (2022) Palmetto
- David Wax Museum “Euphoric Ouroboric” (2021) Mark of the Leopard
- Kane Mathis "Geminus" feat. Sam Minaie and John Hadfield (2021) Nyaato
- Atlantico "A Stovepipe Hat Made From Silk" (2021) La Fabrica’son
- Paul Damian Hogan "The Hut Revisited" (2021) Fake Estate
- Maria Manousaki "Sole Voyage" (2020) PKmusic
- Nguyen Le Streams Quartet (2019) ACT Records
- Magic Moments 12 “One World of Music” (2019) ACT Records
- Joel Harrison “Free Country Volume 3” (2019) HighNote Records
- Angel Gil-Ordóñez / Perspectives Ensemble “Falla: El amor brujo; El retablo de Maese Pedro” (2019) Naxos
- Jean Chaumont "The Beauty of Differences" (feat. Vinod Gnanaraj, John Hadfield & Enoch Smith Jr.) (2018)
- Combo Nuvo "One World Suite" (2018) CN Records
- Petros Klampanis “Chroma” (2017) Motema Music
- David Lopato “Gending for a Spirit Rising” (2017)
- Nathan Goheen "Blues in Brown" (2017)
- Nederlands Blazers Ensemble "In G*dsnaam (Live)" Composer (2016) NBE Live
- Nicole Johänntgen "Robin" (2016)
- Petro Klampanis “Minor Dispute” (2015) Cristal Records
- Benjamin Koppel "Breaking Borders #4" featuring Uri Caine, John Hadfield and Kinan Azmeh (2015) Cowbell
- Fun Home (Broadway Cast Recording) (2015) PS Classics
- Judy Kuhn “Rodgers, Rodgers & Guettel” (2015) PS Classics
- Duo Lev-Yulzari "Azafea"(with Frank London & John Hadfield) (2014) Editions De L'iemj
- Emilio Teubal “Musica Para Un Dragon Dormido” (2013) BJU Records
- Uri Sharlin & The Dogcat Ensemble “Back to the Woods” (2013) Folk Dune
- Cristina Pato “Migrations: Roots and Jazz in NYC” (2013) Sunnyside
- Suphala “Alien Ancestry” (2013) Tzadik
- Kinan Azmeh CityBand “Elastic City” (2012)
- Huda Asfour “Mars (Back and Forth)” (2012)
- Maya "The Book of Goddesses" (Music by Robert Paterson) American Modern Recordings (2011)
- Sky White Tiger "Electra" (2011)
- Christmas from the Blue Note (2010) Half Note Records
- Combo Nuvo "Far Far From Home" (2010) CN Records
- Yo Yo Ma and Friends Songs of Joy and Peace (2009) SONY (2010 GRAMMY Award Winner for Best Classical Crossover Album.)
- Dead Heart Bloom “Strange Waves” (2010)
- Paul Damian Hogan "The Hut" (2009) Fake Lake
- Dead Heart Bloom “Oh Mercy” (2008)
- Dead Heart Bloom “Fall In” (2008)
- Dead Heart Bloom “In Chains” (2008)
- Skye Steele “Later Bloomer” (2007)
- Harel Shachel & Anistar “Esh” (2005) The Common Gene
- Krystle Warren & The Faculty (2005) Parlour Door Music
- Combo Nuvo "Nouveau Sketches" (2002) CN Records
