= Tal Arbel =

Professor of Electrical Engineering

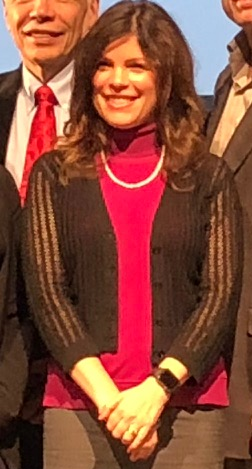
- Tal Arbel at the 2018 Trottier Public Science Symposium
- Education: McGill University
- Awards: D.W. Ambridge Dissertation Award
- Scientific career
- Workplaces: McGill University
- Thesis: Active Object Recognition Conditioned by Probabilistic Evidence and Entropy Maps (2000)
- Doctoral advisor: Frank Ferrie
- Website: www.cim.mcgill.ca/~arbel

Tal Arbel is a professor of electrical engineering at McGill University who specialises in computer vision. She is interested in the application of artificial intelligence in healthcare.

== Early life and education ==
Arbel was born in Montreal. Arbel's father was an electrical engineer. As a child Arbel was given a TRS-80 computer, which she used to play video games like pong. Alongside her computer, Arbel's father encouraged her to play with model planes and Lego. She studied science at CEGEP, before joining McGill University for her undergraduate degree in electrical engineering. She completed her Bachelor's (1992), Master's (1995) and PhD (2000) at McGill University. Her PhD considered object recognition using entropy maps. Her PhD thesis was awarded the D.W. Ambridge Prize for the best dissertation in Physical Sciences and Engineering at McGill University. After completing her PhD, Arbel worked at the Montreal Neurological Hospital, where she developed computer vision methods for neurology and neurosurgery. She became interested in using software to detect tumours and lesions in brain images.

== Career ==
She works on algorithms to interpret medical images, which are used to assist in drug discovery and diagnostics. She is particularly interested in graphical models for pathology in large datasets of patient images. Her software can be used for image-guided neurosurgery. She was appointed to McGill University as a Research associate in 2000 and made an assistant professor in 2001. She has worked on facial attribute classification and labelling in real-world videos. She received funding from the Natural Sciences and Engineering Research Council to launch the Collaborative Research and Training Experience Program in Medical Image Analysis (CREATE-MIA) program.

At McGill, Arbel leads the Probabilistic Vision Group, which is part of the Centre for Intelligent Machines. She is also an Associate Member of the Montreal Institute for Learning Algorithms (MILA). She is interested in the biomarkers that can be used to improve medical care for people who suffer from Multiple Sclerosis. This project is a collaboration with Dr. Arnold at the Montreal Neurological Institute and Hospital and looks to identify Multiple Sclerosis lesions from magnetic resonance images. She created an Adaptive Multi-level Conditional Random Field (AMCRF) framework that can leverage spatial and temporal information. She demonstrated that cortical folding patterns in the brain vary over the population. Her recent work looks to use deep learning in medical image analysis. For MS diagnostics, including a 3D MS lesion segmentation convolutional neural network (CNN). In an effort for to understand brain morphometry, Arbel has developed models for computational neuroanatomy.

Arbel is the first woman to be made a Full Professor of Electrical Engineering at McGill University. She is committed to improving diversity in engineering, and is part of several women in computer vision committees. She is a mentor for young women working in science.

== Recognition ==
Arbel was featured in the Status of Women Canada "Yes Women in Tech" postcard series. She is a Member of the Ordre des ingénieurs du Québec. She won the McGill Engineering Christophe Pierre Research Award in 2019. She is a Fellow of the Canadian Academy of Engineering.
