= Pearl and the Beard =

Pearl and the Beard was a folk-pop trio from New York City. Their songs feature prominent three-part vocal harmonies with instrumentation that includes cello, guitar, micro korg, tenor electric guitar, baritone ukulele, and drums. They were known as "musician's musicians" and have greatly influenced many artists of their generation. They left Family Records management and label in 2011, forming an independent career and joining MCT Management in 2013. They have worked with producer Franz Nicolay, Dan Brennan and Nadim Issa. They have been featured on World Cafe from NPR and have toured and/or collaborated with Ani DiFranco, Ingrid Michaelson, Devotchka, Brandi Carlile, Neko Case, Iron and Wine, Lucius, and Lady Lamb The Beekeeper, and more.

== Members ==
- Jocelyn Mackenzie (percussion, vocals)
- Emily Hope Price (cello, piano, tenor electric guitar, tenor and baritone ukulele, vocals)
- Jeremy Styles (acoustic and electric guitar, vocals)

== History ==
Members Jeremy Styles and Jocelyn Mackenzie met at an open mic in 2007 and begin writing songs together. A few months later the two stumbled upon Emily Hope Price at another open mic and she joined the group. They released their first EP, At Home With Pearl and the Beard later that year. In 2009 they produced their first full-length album entitled, God Bless Your Weary Soul, Amanda Richardson. In 2011, the band's sophomore album, Killing the Darlings, was released. The band then began working on their third album BEAST in 2013. Beast was officially released at their farewell show on November 19, 2015.

On June 18, 2015, they announced they were breaking up.

== Discography ==
- God Bless Your Weary Soul, Amanda Richardson (2009)
- Black Vessel EP (2010)
- Killing the Darlings (2011)
- Prodigal Daughter Extended Single (2012)
- Welcome Campers (live collaboration published online by The Wild Honey Pie and Consequence of Sound; 2013)
- Beast (2015)
