= Sivan Arbel =

Israeli singer

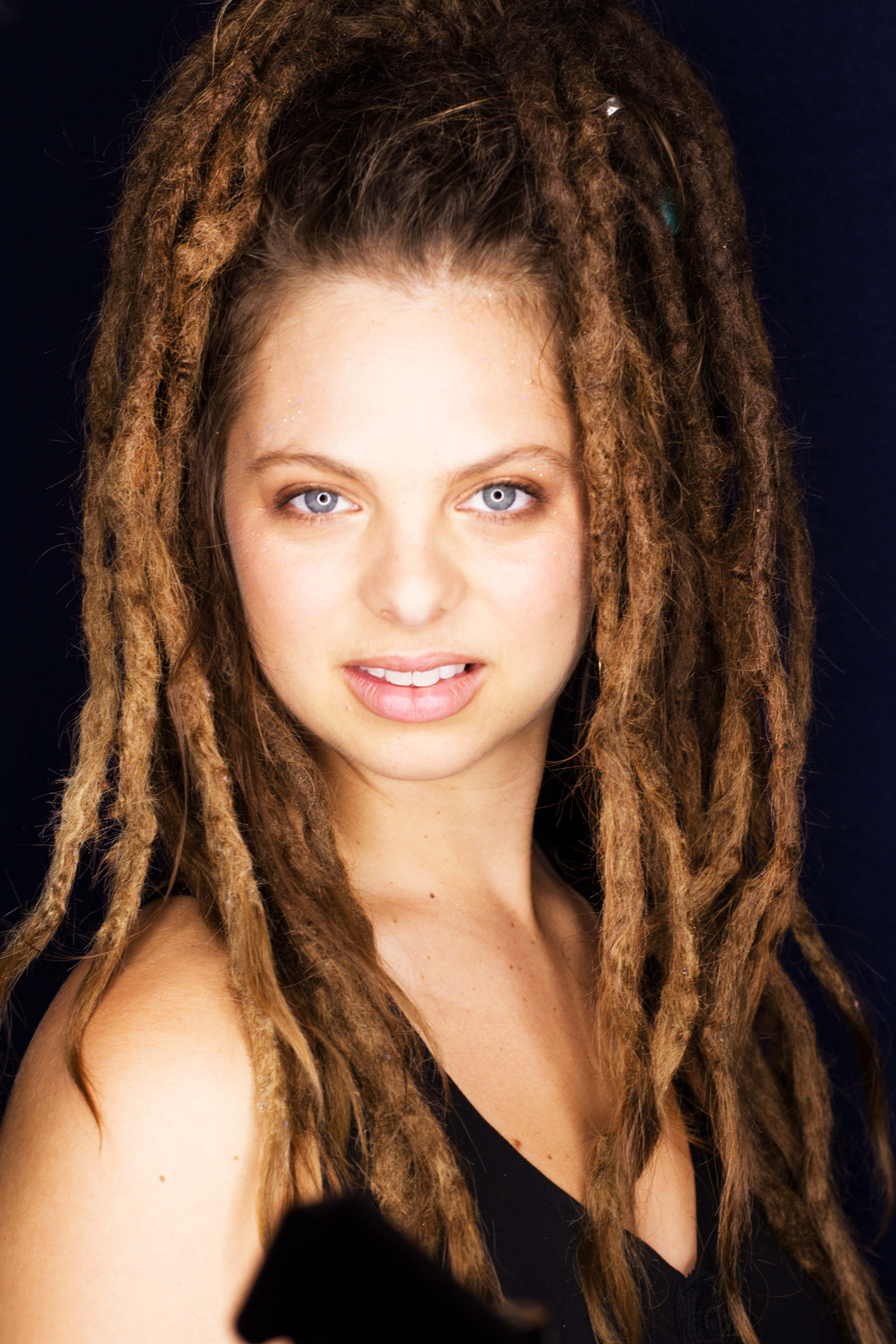

Sivan Arbel (Hebrew: סיון ארבל) is a composer and arranger in jazz. Sivan has collaborated with a wide array of musicians such as Japanese band Ichimujin, Pandero player Tuliio Araujo, pianist Guy Mintus, as well as several dance projects.

== Education and career ==
Arbel studied dance and voice at Yad Harif art center in Israel. She then attended the Rimon School of Music, majoring in the jazz performance department. Between 2013 and 2014, Arbel studied at the Newpark Music School Center in Dublin, Ireland; she was selected as the school's representative at the 24th Annual International Association of Schools of Jazz which was held in South Africa.

She has performed as a singer and dancer around the world, including Israel, Turkey, Bulgaria and the U.S. In 2016, She took part in the Israeli musical performance of If I Could Rewrite the World and went on tour with a rock band.

Arbel also teaches music and vocal development globally, including the Saint Music College in Rome, Anton Bruckner Private University in Linz, and The Musicianship in Washington D.C.

Arbel performed at the Montreal Jazz Festival in 2016 as part of the Jazz Composers series. In 2019, Arbel participated in the Bratislava Jazz Days Festival, The Boston Jazz Festival, and The Fort Greene Park Jazz Festival.

== Albums ==
2016: Broken Lines

2019: Change of Light; selected by Jazz2K as Best Vocal Disc of 2019; listed by 41st Annual Jazz Station Awards as “Top Vocal Jazz Album; included as “Musical Choice of 2019” by Giancarlo Meis.

== Notable performances ==
In 2013, Arbel was chosen to represent Israel and served as the primary Israeli performer at the Venezuelan Israeli Independence Day celebrations. Also, her appearance as a company singer in the Pre-Eurovision Contest was broadcast on Israeli television.

She has performed with Brazilian pandeiro player Tulio Araújo, Guy Mintus, Ichimujin (Japanese band) and Trumpet player Rachel Therrien.
