= Ike Sturm =

American bassist, composer, and bandleader

- Born: June 29, 1978 (age 48); Wisconsin, U.S.
- Genres: Jazz
- Occupations: Musician, composer
- Instrument: Upright bass

Ike Sturm (born 29 June 1978) is a bassist, composer, and bandleader in New York. He serves as music director for the Jazz Ministry at Saint Peter's Church in Manhattan.

== Biography ==
Raised in a musical home in Wisconsin, Sturm learned from his father, composer and arranger Fred Sturm. He received degrees from the Eastman School of Music and has performed with Gene Bertoncini, Donny McCaslin, Bobby McFerrin, Ben Monder, Ingrid Jensen, Steve Lehman, Maria Schneider, Kenny Wheeler and many others. He has played on four Down Beat award-winning recordings as well as Steve Reich's albums for Cantaloupe Music and Nonesuch Records. He has appeared with the International Contemporary Ensemble, Signal and Alarm Will Sound.

Commissioned by Saint Peter's Church, he composed Jazz Mass as a large-scale work featuring choir, string orchestra, and saxophonist Donny McCaslin. The recording received 4 1/2 stars rating and was named among the Best of 2010 in Down Beat magazine. Jazz Mass premiered in Europe in 2011 at the Gedächtniskirche in Berlin.

== Discography ==
=== Solo albums ===
- 2004: Spirit (Ike Sturm)
- 2009: Jazzmass (CD Baby)

=== Collaborations ===
With Steve Reich

- 2002: Tehillim / The Desert Music (Cantaloupe)

With Ted Poor Quartet

- 2004: All Around (Trier)

With Kira Fontana

- 2007: The Inner Revolution (Spark the Fire)

With Alan Ferber

- 20110: Music for Nonet and Strings / Chamber Songs (Sunnyside)

With Jostein Gulbrandsen Trio

- 2011: Release of Tension (CD Baby)

With J.J. Wright

- 2014: Inward Looking Outward (Ropeadope)
