= Rachel Eckroth =

American singer-songwriter and keyboardist

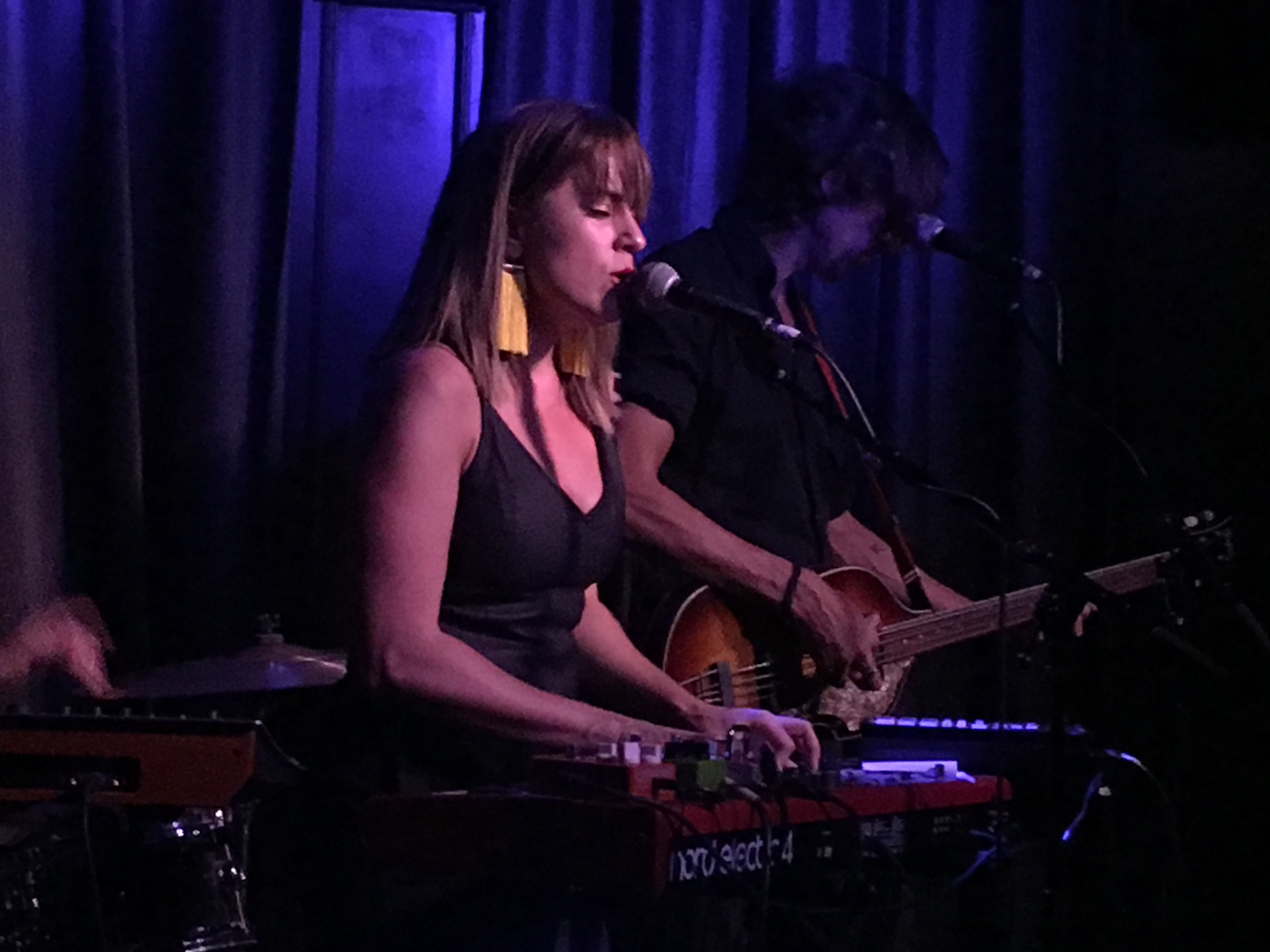
- Eckroth performing live in 2019.

Background information
- Origin: Phoenix, Arizona, United States
- Genres: Singer-songwriter; jazz
- Occupations: Musician; singer; keyboardist
- Instruments: Vocals; keyboards
- Years active: 1997–present
- Labels: Sam First; Rainy Days
- Website: racheleckroth.com

Rachel Eckroth is an American singer-songwriter and keyboardist from Phoenix, Arizona. She is currently the keyboardist for alternative musician St. Vincent and singer-songwriter Rufus Wainwright after being the keyboardist for jazz trumpeter Chris Botti, singer-songwriter KT Tunstall, and The Meredith Vieira Show. Her album The Garden was released by Rainy Days Records in 2021 and was nominated for the 64th Annual Grammy Award for Best Contemporary Instrumental Album.

== Biography ==
Rachel Eckroth was born into a musical family in Mandan, North Dakota and raised in Phoenix, Arizona. As a high school student, she was already performing in the Phoenix jazz scene and had the mentorship of former Count Basie vocalist Dennis Rowland. She then went to study at the University of Nevada, Las Vegas receiving her BA in Jazz Performance. In 2001, Eckroth moved to New York City and studied under jazz pianist Stanley Cowell at Rutgers University before receiving her MFA in Jazz Piano. In 2005 Eckroth released her debut album Mind with bassist Kevin Thomas and drummer Chris Benham. Later, Eckroth joined saxophonist Arun Luthra to release the album Louder Than Words in 2009.

In 2014, Eckroth released her album Let Go, which began her pursuit of singer-songwriter music. Later that year, she also released Makeover Volume 1, an EP featuring pop covers of her musical influences.

Eckroth was also the keyboardist for The Meredith Vieira Show house band from 2014 to 2016 before joining the backing band for singer-songwriter KT Tunstall in 2016. She then began her role as the keyboardist for Chris Botti in 2017.

In 2017 Eckroth also formed a fusion jazz group called Antelog, who released their self-titled debut album that same year. In addition, Eckroth served as the assistant music director for the 2017 Women's March in Washington DC.

Eckroth released her new album When It Falls in September 2018. The album features many guest musicians including bassist Tim Lefebvre (David Bowie, Tedeschi Trucks Band), guitarist Doyle Bramhall II (Eric Clapton, Roger Waters), Matt Chamberlain (Tori Amos, Pearl Jam) and guitarist Derek Trucks (Tedeschi Trucks Band and the Allman Brothers Band). In May 2018, she released her first single from the album titled "Dark Waters".

She was the keyboardist for singer-songwriter Rufus Wainwright and was also the supporting act for his All These Poses Anniversary Tour in 2018–2019. She released the single "I'll Try" with singer-songwriter Althea Grace in 2019, along with two singles "Dale Cooper" and "Laura Palmer" with Antelog. In 2020, she released the singles "Get U Ready", "Perfect Love" ft. Sy Smith, and "Gloomy Sunday". She was also featured on saxophonist Donny McCaslin's single "Circling" and on NPR's Jazz Night in America with bassist Tim Lefebvre.

Eckroth released the single "Moot Points" with singer Alassane and bassist Tim Lefebvre in 2021. Eckroth and Lefebvre also released an album of jazz standards titled The Blackbird Sessions Vol. 1. That same year, Eckroth released a self-titled EP that was produced by David Garza (Fiona Apple) at Sonic Ranch. In 2021, Eckroth also released her album The Garden on Rainy Days Records, which included saxophonist Donny McCaslin, bassist Tim Lefebvre, and guitarist Nir Felder. The Garden received acclaim and was nominated for the 64th Annual Grammy Award for Best Contemporary Instrumental Album.

Eckroth also appeared on Aimee Mann's 2021 album Queens of the Summer Hotel. In 2023, Eckroth was the keyboardist for bassist/songwriter Mike Gordon (Phish).

Eckroth released two albums in 2023: a solo piano album titled One consisting mostly of improvisations, and a live album titled Humanoid on Sam First Records with bassist Billy Mohler, drummer Tina Raymond, and guitarist Andrew Renfroe.

Eckroth is currently touring as the keyboardist for St. Vincent, beginning on the Daddy's Home Tour in 2021. Eckroth also appeared on St. Vincent's 2024 album All Born Screaming. On September 3rd, 2025, St. Vincent performed on the BBC Proms alongside Jules Buckley and his orchestra. Eckroth is credited as an arranger for multiple tracks on the setlist, and also performed on keyboard during the performance.

== Discography ==
=== As leader ===
- Mind (2005)
- Louder Than Words with Arun Luthra (2009)
- Let Go (Virgo Sun, 2014)
- When It Falls (Virgo Sun, 2018)
- The Blackbird Sessions Vol. 1 with Tim Lefebvre (2021)
- The Garden (Rainy Days, 2021)
- One (2023)
- Humanoid (Sam First, 2023)
- Saturn with John Hadfield (Adhyâropa Records 2024)
- Speaking in Tongues with John Hadfield (Adhyâropa Records 2025)

==== As guest ====
- Marion Meadows, Secrets (2009)
- KT Tunstall, Live at O2 Shepherds Bush Empire (2016)
- Emily Saliers, Murmuration Nation (2017)
- KT Tunstall, KT Tunstall's Acoustic Extravaganza 2 (2017)
- Aimee Mann, Queens of the Summer Hotel (2021)
- Céline Bonacina, Jump! (2023)
- St. Vincent, All Born Screaming (2024)
- The Saints of Paris, Collage (2024)
- The Saints of Paris, Alone with the Moon (2024)
