= Mofet Institute =

Coordinates: 32.131842°N 34.79402°E

The MOFET Institute logo

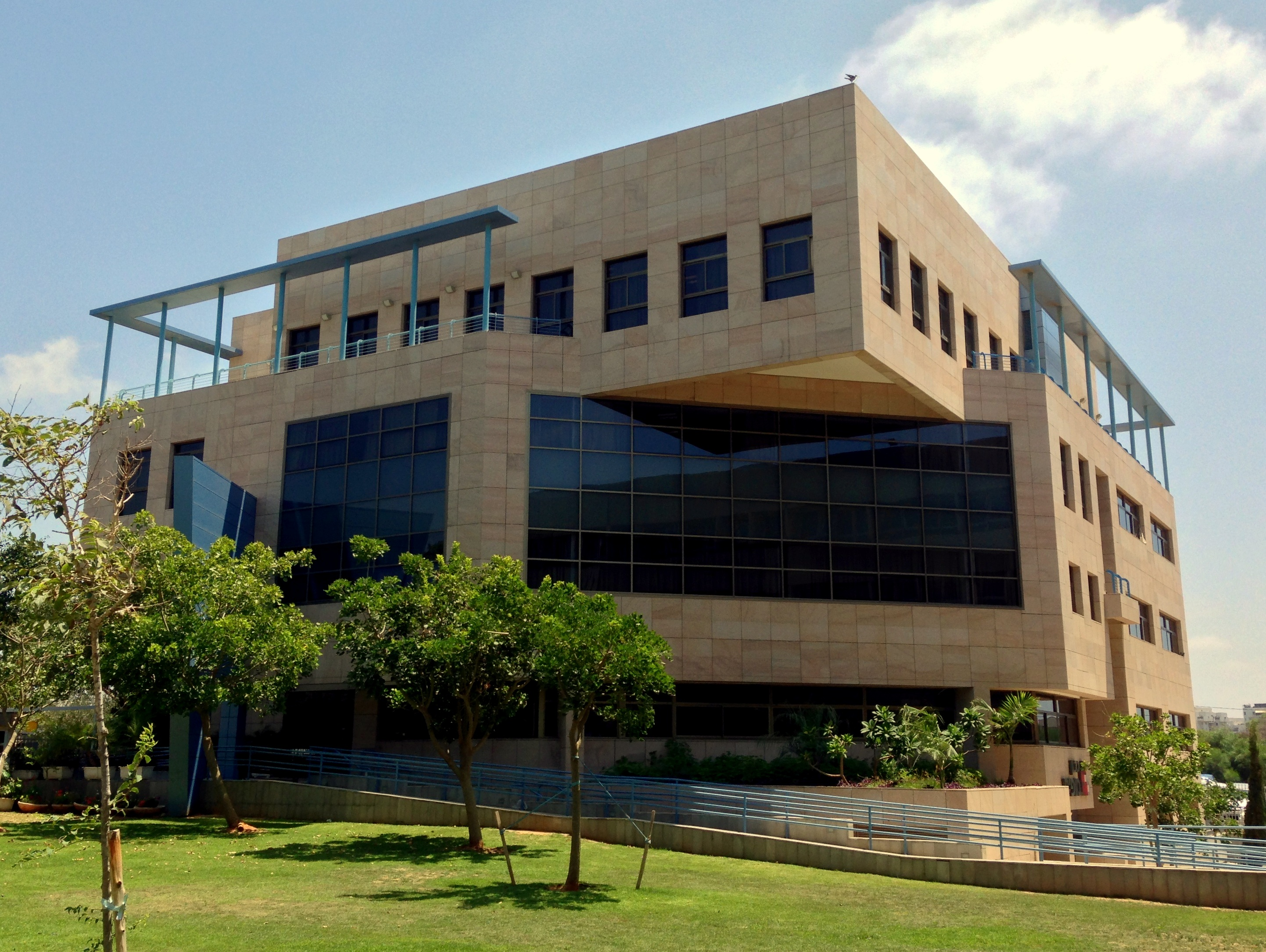
The building of the Mofet Institute

The MOFET Institute (Hebrew: מכון מופ"ת) is a consortium of Israeli colleges of education which specializes in "research, curriculum and program development for teacher educators". It was founded by the Israel Ministry of Education in 1983, as the Institute for Curriculum Planning and Teacher Training, and took its present name in 1988.

Located inside the Levinsky College of Education campus in Tel Aviv.
