= Eric Schaefer =

Professor and film historian

Eric Schaefer (born 1959) is a film historian. He is Professor Emeritus of visual and media arts at Emerson College.

He has a B.A. from Webster University, and an M.A. and Ph.D. from the University of Texas, Austin.

He is best known for his book on exploitation filmmaking, Bold! Daring! Shocking! True: A History of Exploitation Films, 1919-1959, published by Duke University Press in 1999. He has been described as "the go-to academic source on the genre of exploitation films."

He is a member of the Northeast Historic Film board of advisors and a member of the editorial board of the journal The Moving Image.

== Selected works ==
- Bold! Daring! Shocking! True": A History of Exploitation Films, 1919-1959 (1999) - Duke University Press.
- "Plain Brown Wrapper: Adult Films for the Home Market, 1930-1970", In the Absence of Films: Towards a New Historiographic Practice, Eric Smoodin and Jon Lewis, editors, Duke University Press.
- "Gauging a Revolution: 16mm Film and the Rise of the Pornographic Feature". Cinema Journal - 41, Number 3, Spring 2002, pp. 3–26.
- "Dirty Little Secrets: Scholars, Archivists, and Dirty Movies". The Moving Image - Volume 5, Number 2, Fall 2005, pp. 79–105
