= Gregory Porter discography =

Artist discography

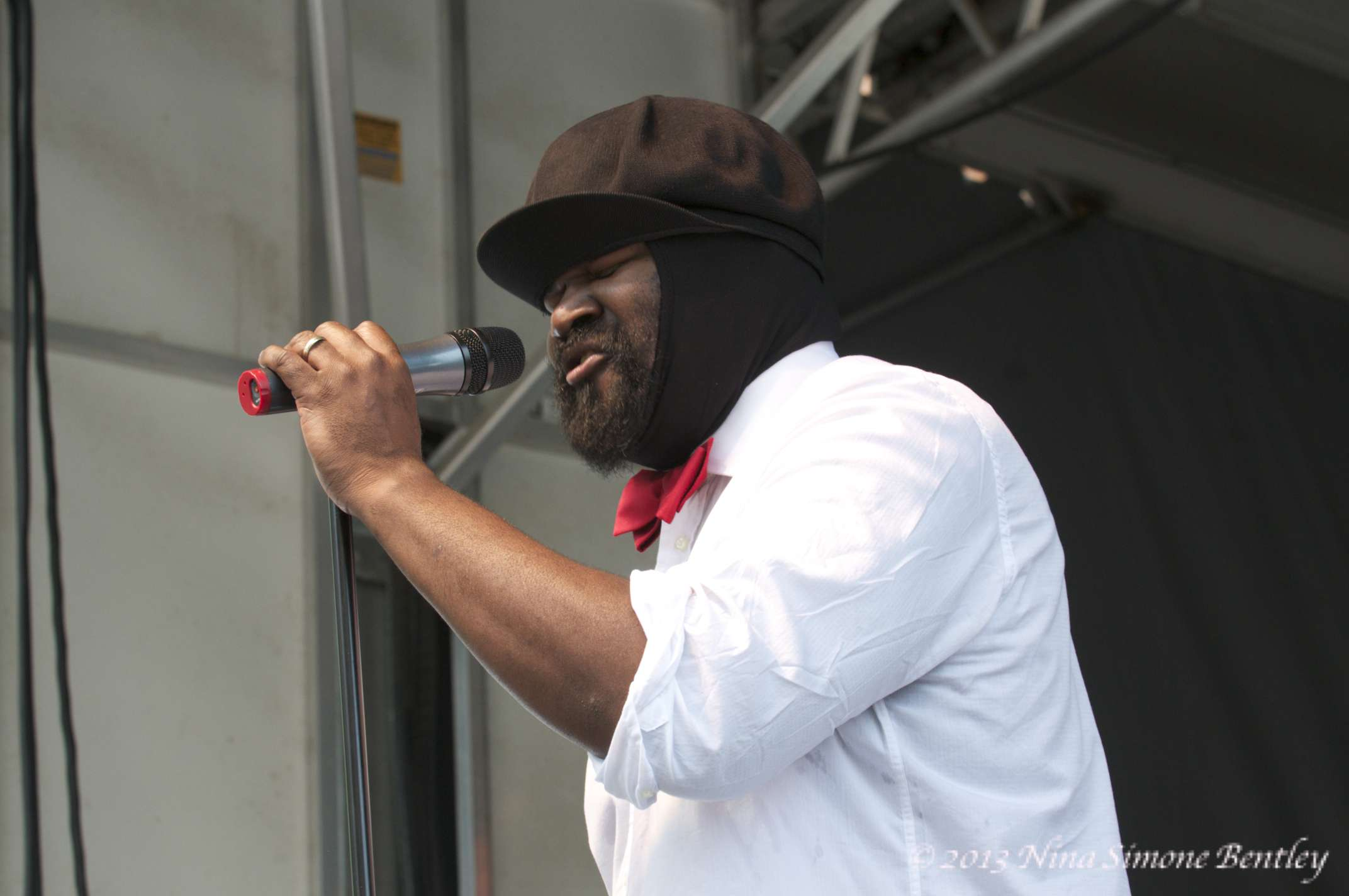
- Porter at JazzLive International, Pittsburgh, 2015
- Studio albums: 7
- EPs: 1
- Live albums: 2
- Compilation albums: 2
- Singles: 19

American singer-songwriter Gregory Porter has released seven studio albums, one collaborative album, two compilation albums, two live albums, one EP, and 18 singles.

== Albums ==
=== Studio albums ===
List of studio albums, with selected chart positions
Title	Details	Peak chart positions										Certifications
Title	Details	US	AUT	BEL	DEN	FRA	GER	NED	NOR	SWI	UK	Certifications
Water	Released: May 11, 2010; Label: Motéma Music; Format: CD, LP, Digital download	—	—	—	—	—	—	40	—	—	—	
Be Good	Released: February 15, 2012; Label: Motéma Music; Format: CD, LP, Digital download	—	—	149	—	144	—	10	—	—	—	
Liquid Spirit	Released: September 2, 2013; Label: Blue Note; Format: CD, LP, Digital download	187	25	35	7	24	8	6	35	63	9	BPI: Platinum; BVMI: 3× Gold; IFPI AUT: Platinum; NVPI: Platinum
Take Me to the Alley	Released: May 6, 2016; Label: Decca, Blue Note; Format: CD, LP, Digital download	82	11	8	—	14	8	5	—	11	5	BPI: Gold
Nat King Cole & Me	Released: October 27, 2017; Label: Decca, Blue Note; Format: CD, LP, Digital download	—	5	21	—	13	17	12	—	22	3	BPI: Gold
All Rise	Released: August 28, 2020; Label: Decca, Blue Note; Format: CD, LP, Digital download	—	3	9	—	8	8	6	—	9	3	
Christmas Wish	Released: November 3, 2023; Label: Decca, Blue Note; Format: CD, LP, Digital download	—	14	—	—	—	26	—	—	48	14	
"—" denotes an album that did not chart or was not released.

=== Collaborative albums ===
List of collaborative albums
Title	Details
Great Voices of Harlem (with Donald Smith and Mansur Scott)	Released: May 6, 2014; Label: PAO Records; Format: CD, Digital download

=== Compilation albums ===
List of compilation albums, with selected chart positions
Title	Details	Peak chart positions			
Title	Details	BEL	GER	NED	UK
Issues of Life: Features and Remixes	Released: September 12, 2014; Label: PAO Records; Format: CD, digital download	138	72	49	—
Still Rising – The Collection	Released: November 5, 2021; Label: Blue Note; Format: CD, digital download	172	84	72	8

=== Live albums ===
List of live albums, with selected chart positions
Title	Details	Peak chart positions	
Title	Details	AUT	BEL
Live in Berlin	Released: November 18, 2016; Label: Eagle Vision; Format: CD, DVD	50	—
One Night Only: Live at the Royal Albert Hall	Released: November 30, 2018; Label: Golden Slipper, Decca; Format: Digital download, CD, DVD	—	197

== EPs ==
Title	Details
More Liquid Spirit – Features + Remixes	Released: 2014; Label: Blue Note Records; Format: CD, Digital download

== Singles ==
=== As lead artist ===
Title	Year	Peak chart positions						Certifications	Album
Title	Year	BEL (Fl)	BEL (Wa)	FRA	IRE	NED	UK	Certifications	Album
"Be Good (Lion's Song)"	2012	—	—	—	—	100	—		Be Good
"On My Way to Harlem"	2012	—	—	—	—	—	—		Be Good
"Musical Genocide"	2013	96	—	—	—	—	—		Liquid Spirit
"The 'In' Crowd"	2014	129	—	—	—	—	—		Liquid Spirit
"No Love Dying"	2014	81	—	—	—	—	—		Liquid Spirit
"Liquid Spirit"	2015	5	47	107	—	45	170	BEA: Gold; BPI: Silver	Liquid Spirit
"Hey Laura"	2015	—	—	189	—	—	142	BPI: Silver	Liquid Spirit
"Water Under Bridges" (featuring Laura Mvula)	2015	—	—	—	61	—	—		Liquid Spirit
"Don't Lose Your Steam"	2016	86	95	—	—	—	—		Take Me to the Alley
"Consequence of Love"	2016	—	—	—	—	—	—		Take Me to the Alley
"Smile"	2017	—	—	142	—	—	—		Nat King Cole & Me
"Light at the End of the Tunnel" (from Starlight Express)	2018	88	—	—	—	—	—		Unmasked: The Platinum Collection
"Revival"	2020	60	79	—	—	—	—		All Rise
"If Love Is Overrated"	2020	—	—	—	—	—	—		All Rise
"Thank You"	2020	—	—	—	—	—	—		All Rise
"Phoenix"	2020	—	—	—	—	—	—		All Rise
"Mister Holland"	2020	—	—	—	—	—	—		All Rise
"Concorde"	2020	—	—	—	—	—	—		All Rise
"America the Beautiful"	2020	—	—	—	—	—	—		Non-album singles
"Christmas Prayer" (with Paloma Faith)	2020	—	—	—	—	—	—		Non-album singles
"Out of My Control"	2021	—	—	—	—	—	—		Blithe Spirit (Soundtrack)
"Somebody" (with TSHA and Ellie Goulding)	2023	—	—	—	—	—	—		Non-album single
"—" denotes a single that did not chart or was not released.

=== As featured artist ===
Title	Year	Peak chart positions									Certifications	Album
Title	Year	US Adult R&B	US Elec	AUS	BEL (Fl)	BEL (Wa)	FRA	NED	UK	UK Dance	Certifications	Album
"Gogo Soul" (The Rongetz Foundation featuring Gregory Porter)	2012	—	—	—	—	—	—	—	—	—		Brooklyn Butterfly Session
"Holding On" (Disclosure featuring Gregory Porter)	2015	20	17	77	63	84	50	67	46	9	BPI: Silver	Caracal
"Stop Crying Your Heart Out" (as BBC Radio 2's Allstars)	2020	—	—	—	—	—	—	—	7	—		Non-album single
"—" denotes a single that did not chart or was not released.

=== Promotional singles ===
Title	Year	Album
"Revisited"	2014	Non-album single

== Guest appearances ==
List of non-single guest appearances, with other performing artists, showing year released and album name
Title	Year	Other artist(s)	Album
"Children, Your Line Is Draggin'"	1999	—N/a	It Ain't Nothin' But the Blues
"Sweet Home Chicago"	1999	G.E. Smith, Buddy Guy	It Ain't Nothin' But the Blues
"Do You Feel Like I Feel"	2011	Nicola Conte	Do You Feel Like I Feel
"Ghana"	2011	Nicola Conte	Do You Feel Like I Feel
"Gogo Soul"	2012	The Rongetz Foundation	Brooklyn Butterfly Session
"Hard Bop Merry Go Round"	2012	The Rongetz Foundation	Brooklyn Butterfly Session
"Love's Work"	2012	Robin McKelle and The Flytones	Soul Flower
"Sweet Country Love Song"	2012	Jools Holland and His Rhythm and Blues Orchestra	The Golden Age of Song
"No Fundo do Teu Silêncio"	2012	Meeco	Beauty of the Night
"Nowhere to Run"	2013	Zbonics	Time to Do Your Thing
"She Danced Across the Floor"	2013	Zbonics	Time to Do Your Thing
"Issues of Life"	2013	Zbonics	Time to Do Your Thing
"She's Gone"	2013	Zbonics	Time to Do Your Thing
"Just in Time"	2013	Zbonics	Time to Do Your Thing
"Satiated (Been Waiting)"	2013	Dianne Reeves	Beautiful Life
"Losin' Our Minds"	2013	Kentyah, M-1, Brian Jackson, The New Midnight Band	Evolutionary Minded: Furthering the Legacy of Gil Scott-Heron
"Occupy Planet Earth"	2013	Kentyah, M-1, Brian Jackson, The New Midnight Band	Evolutionary Minded: Furthering the Legacy of Gil Scott-Heron
"Song of the Wind"	2013	Kentyah, M-1, Brian Jackson, The New Midnight Band	Evolutionary Minded: Furthering the Legacy of Gil Scott-Heron
"Army of the Faithful (Joyful Noise)"	2013	David Murray Infinity Quartet	Be My Monster Love
"About the Children"	2013	David Murray Infinity Quartet	Be My Monster Love
"Hope Is a Thing with Feathers"	2013	David Murray Infinity Quartet	Be My Monster Love
"Souls"	2013	Magnus Lindgren	Souls
"Small Stuff"	2013	Magnus Lindgren	Souls
"Broken Heart"	2013	Magnus Lindgren	Souls
"Vida"	2013	Max Herre	MTV Unplugged Kahedi Radio Show
"So wundervoll"	2013	Max Herre	MTV Unplugged Kahedi Radio Show
"Stand by Me"	2014	Till Brönner	The Movie Album
"Let the Good Times Roll"	2014	Andreas Varady	Come Together EP
"Don't Let Me Be Misunderstood"	2014	Jamie Cullum	Interlude
"Go Tell It on the Mountain / Ain't No Mountain High Enough" (Medley)	2014	Anita Wilson	Motown Christmas
"Have Yourself a Merry Little Christmas"	2014	Renée Fleming	Winter in New York
"Central Park Serenade"	2014	Renée Fleming	Winter in New York
"Black Is the Colour (Of My True Love's Hair)"	2014	—N/a	Autour de Nina
"Holding On"	2015	Disclosure	Caracal
"Right Where You Are"	2015	Lizz Wright	Freedom and Surrender
"Afro Blue"	2015	Harold Mabern	Afro Blue
"The Man from Hyde Park"	2015	Harold Mabern	Afro Blue
"Let It Be"	2016	Miloš Karadaglić	Blackbird – The Beatles Album
"Raining in My Heart"	2018	Buddy Holly, Royal Philharmonic Orchestra	True Love Ways
