= List of UK Jazz & Blues Albums Chart number ones of 2016 =

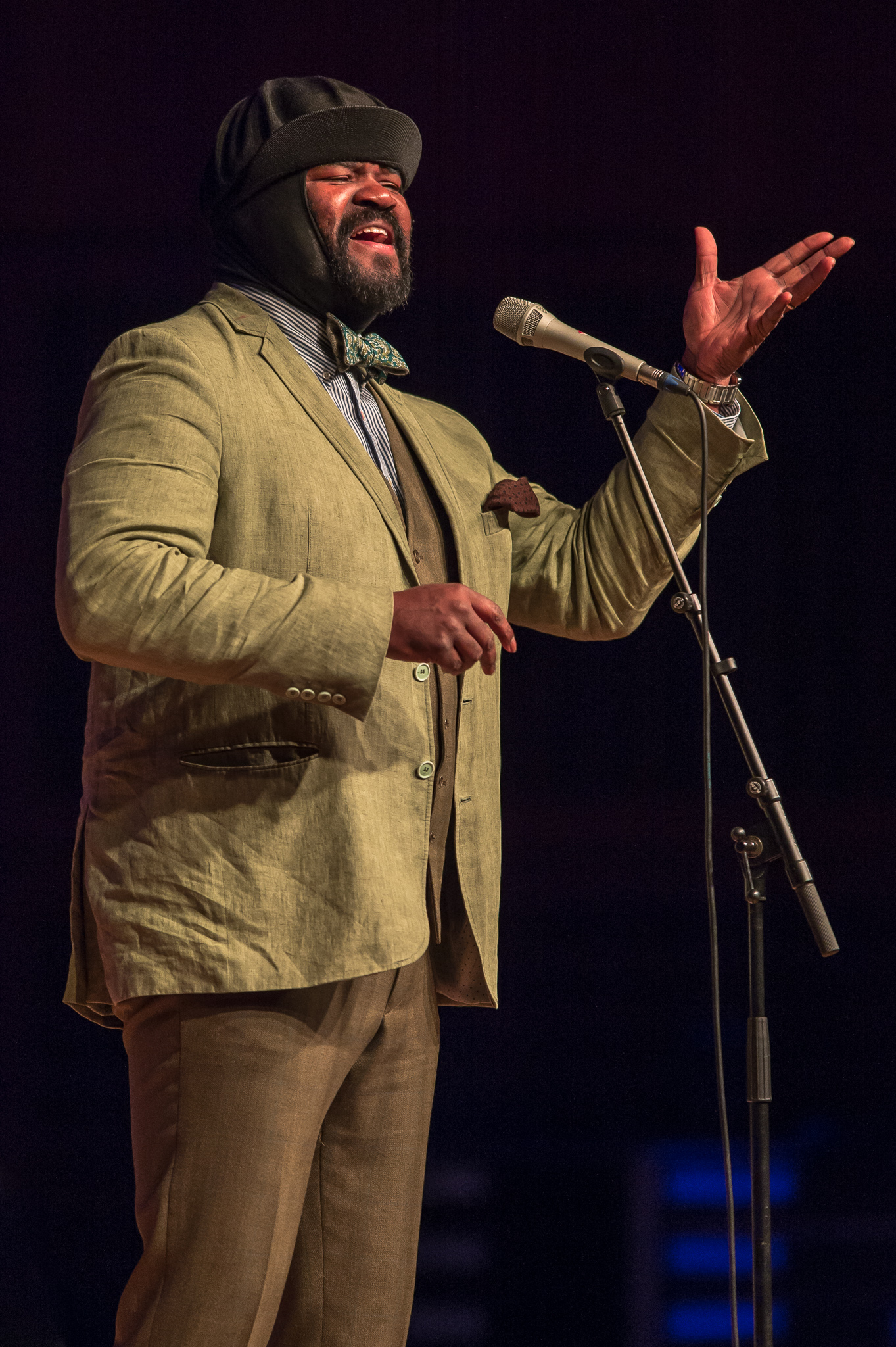
Gregory Porter's fourth album Take Me to the Alley spent a total of ten weeks atop the UK Jazz & Blues Albums Chart in 2015, while his third album Liquid Spirit was number one for six weeks.

The UK Jazz & Blues Albums Chart is a record chart which ranks the best-selling jazz and blues albums in the United Kingdom. Compiled and published by the Official Charts Company, the data is based on each album's weekly physical sales, digital downloads and streams. In 2016, 53 charts were published with 14 albums at number one. The first number-one album of the year was the self-titled debut album by Nathaniel Rateliff & the Night Sweats, which spent the first two weeks of the year atop the chart. The last number-one album of the year was Blue & Lonesome by The Rolling Stones, which spent the last four weeks of the year atop the chart.

The most successful albums on the UK Jazz & Blues Albums Chart in 2016 were Nathaniel Rateliff & the Night Sweats and Gregory Porter's fourth album Take Me to the Alley, both of which spent ten weeks at the top spot. Porter spent a further six weeks at number one with Liquid Spirit. The various artists compilation The Jazz Album was number one for five weeks, while three albums – Blues of Desperation by Joe Bonamassa, Keepin' the Horse Between Me and the Ground by Seasick Steve, and Blue & Lonesome – each had four weeks atop the chart. Blue & Lonesome finished 2016 as the 17th best-selling album of the year in the UK.

== Chart history ==
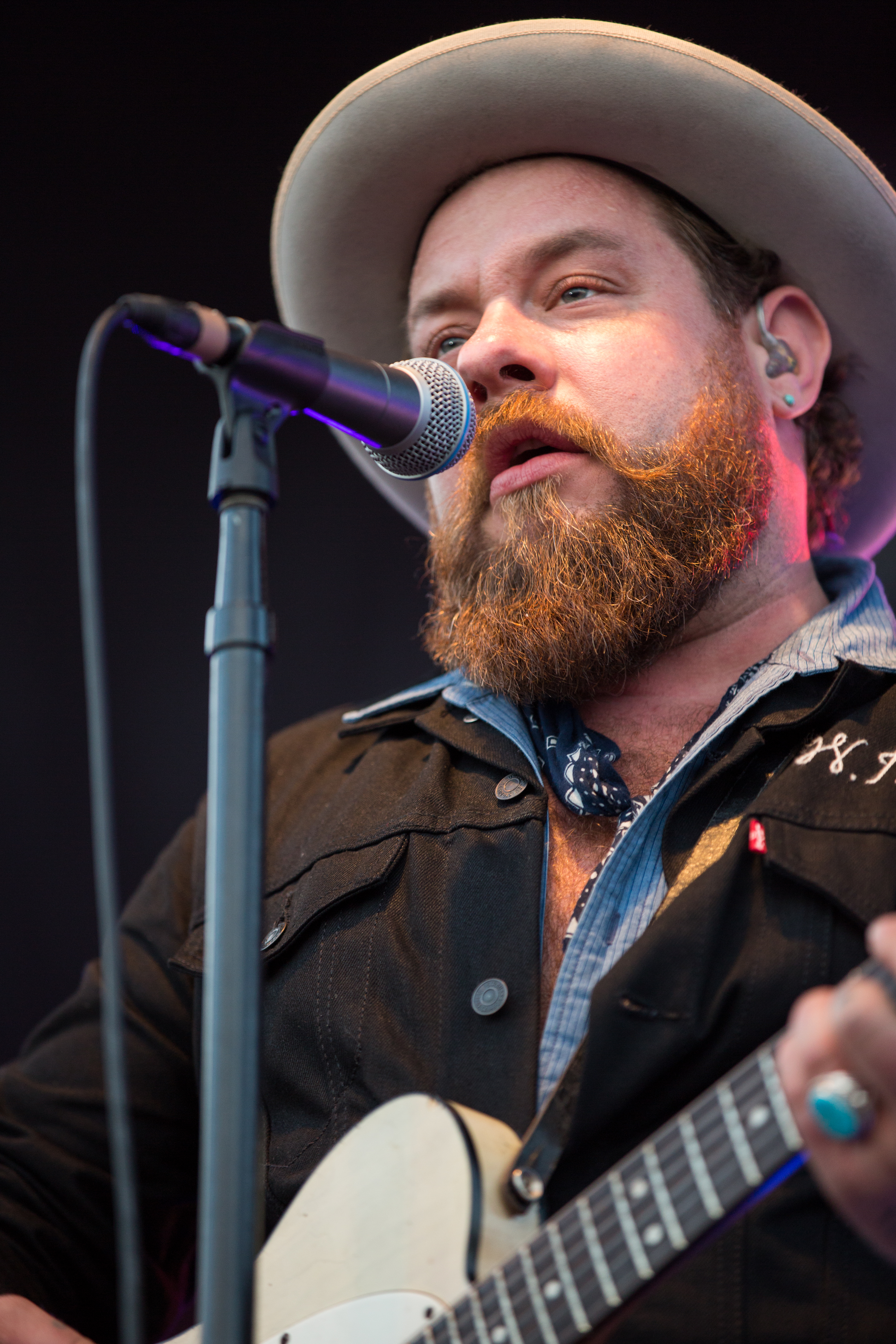
Nathaniel Rateliff spent ten weeks at number one with the first album credited to his band the Night Sweats, Nathaniel Rateliff & the Night Sweats.

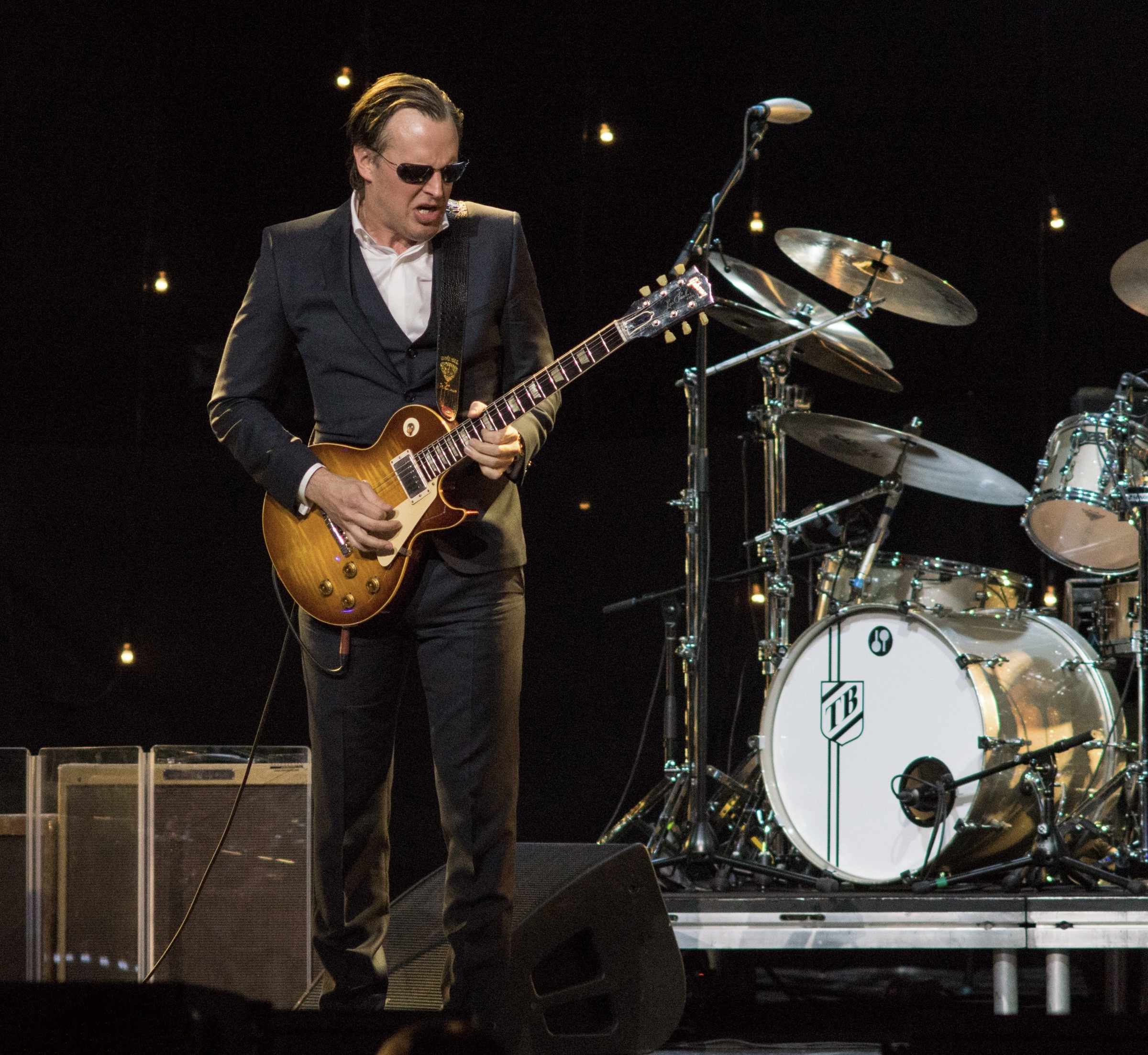
Joe Bonamassa spent five weeks at number one in 2016 – four with Different Shades of Blue, one with Live at the Greek Theatre.

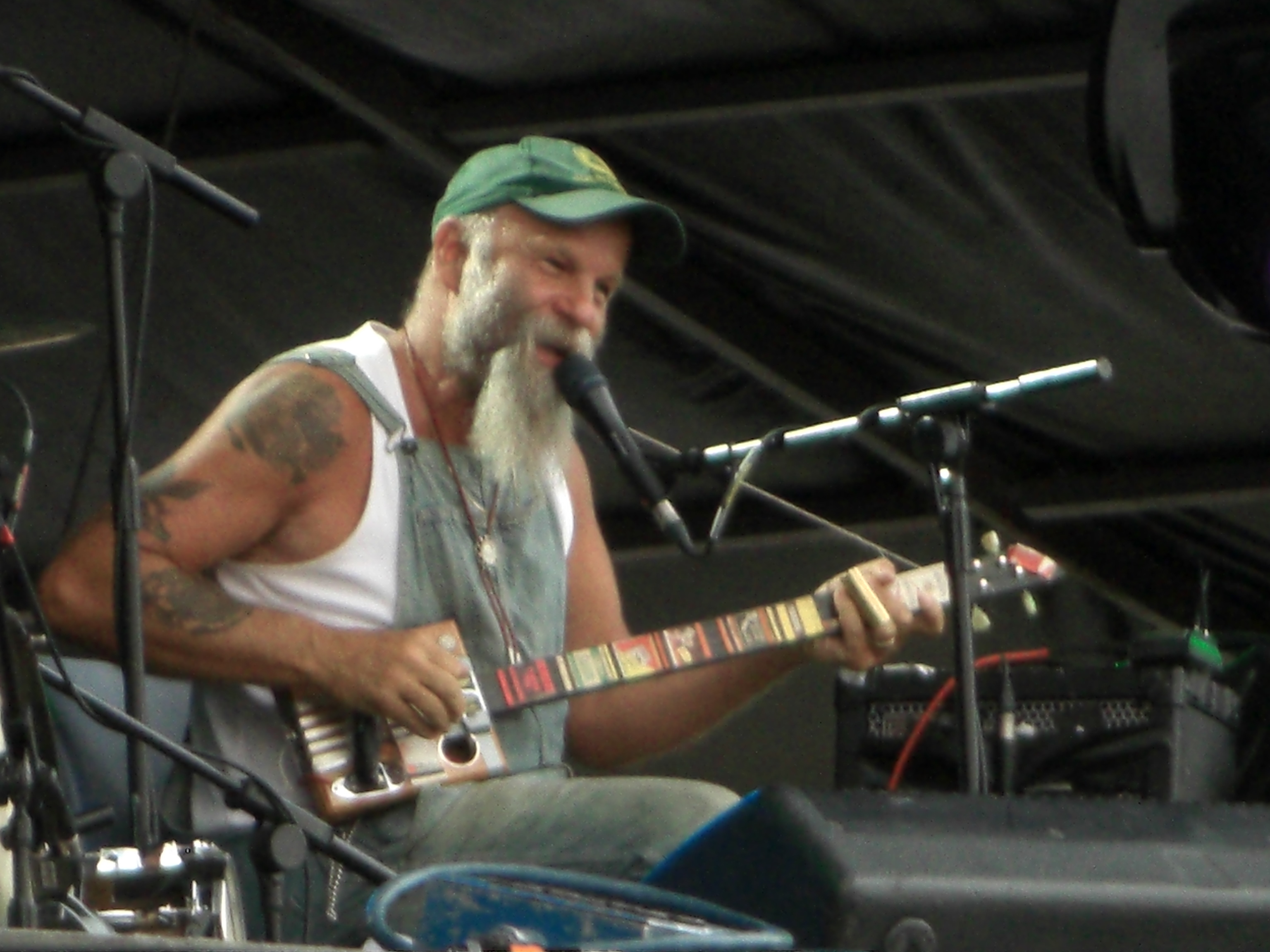
Seasick Steve was number one for four weeks with his eighth studio album Keepin' the Horse Between Me and the Ground.

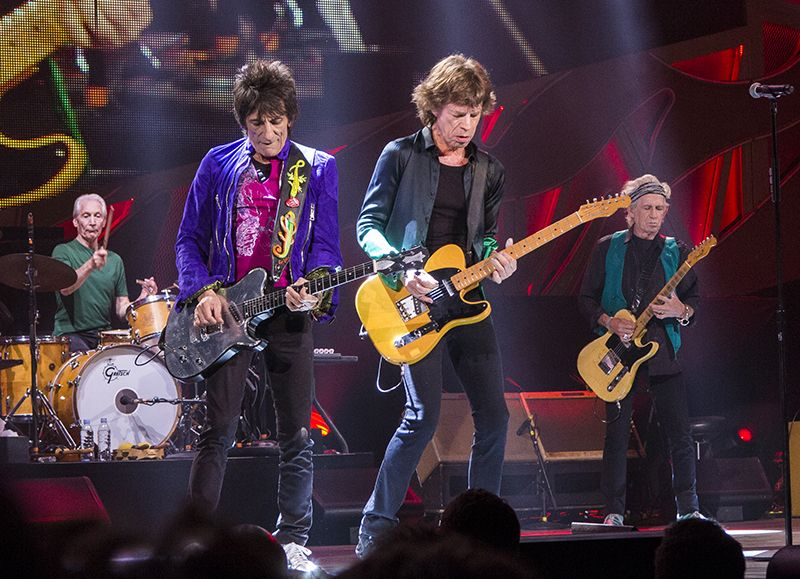
The Rolling Stones spent the last four weeks of 2016 atop the UK Jazz & Blues Album Chart with Blue & Lonesome.

Key
†	Indicates best-selling jazz/blues album of 2016

Issue date	Album	Artist(s)	Record label(s)	Ref.
1 January	Nathaniel Rateliff & the Night Sweats	Nathaniel Rateliff & the Night Sweats	Concord	
8 January	Nathaniel Rateliff & the Night Sweats	Nathaniel Rateliff & the Night Sweats	Concord	
15 January	Frank	Amy Winehouse	Island	
22 January	Frank	Amy Winehouse	Island	
29 January	Nathaniel Rateliff & the Night Sweats	Nathaniel Rateliff & the Night Sweats	Concord	
5 February	Nathaniel Rateliff & the Night Sweats	Nathaniel Rateliff & the Night Sweats	Concord	
12 February	Man Made Object	GoGo Penguin	Blue Note	
19 February	Nathaniel Rateliff & the Night Sweats	Nathaniel Rateliff & the Night Sweats	Concord	
26 February	Nathaniel Rateliff & the Night Sweats	Nathaniel Rateliff & the Night Sweats	Concord	
4 March	Nathaniel Rateliff & the Night Sweats	Nathaniel Rateliff & the Night Sweats	Concord	
11 March	Nathaniel Rateliff & the Night Sweats	Nathaniel Rateliff & the Night Sweats	Concord	
18 March	Nathaniel Rateliff & the Night Sweats	Nathaniel Rateliff & the Night Sweats	Concord	
25 March	Nathaniel Rateliff & the Night Sweats	Nathaniel Rateliff & the Night Sweats	Concord	
1 April	Blues of Desperation	Joe Bonamassa	Provogue	
8 April	Blues of Desperation	Joe Bonamassa	Provogue	
15 April	Blues of Desperation	Joe Bonamassa	Provogue	
22 April	Blues of Desperation	Joe Bonamassa	Provogue	
29 April	Liquid Spirit	Gregory Porter	Blue Note	
6 May	Liquid Spirit	Gregory Porter	Blue Note	
13 May	Take Me to the Alley	Gregory Porter	Blue Note	
20 May	Take Me to the Alley	Gregory Porter	Blue Note	
27 May	I Still Do	Eric Clapton	Polydor	
3 June	Take Me to the Alley	Gregory Porter	Blue Note	
10 June	Take Me to the Alley	Gregory Porter	Blue Note	
17 June	The Jazz Album	various artists	Decca	
24 June	The Jazz Album	various artists	Decca	
1 July	The Jazz Album	various artists	Decca	
8 July	The Jazz Album	various artists	Decca	
15 July	The Jazz Album	various artists	Decca	
22 July	Take Me to the Alley	Gregory Porter	Blue Note	
29 July	Take Me to the Alley	Gregory Porter	Blue Note	
5 August	Take Me to the Alley	Gregory Porter	Blue Note	
12 August	Take Me to the Alley	Gregory Porter	Blue Note	
19 August	Liquid Spirit	Gregory Porter	Blue Note	
26 August	Liquid Spirit	Gregory Porter	Blue Note	
2 September	Liquid Spirit	Gregory Porter	Blue Note	
9 September	Liquid Spirit	Gregory Porter	Blue Note	
16 September	Take Me to the Alley	Gregory Porter	Blue Note	
23 September	Secular Hymns	Madeleine Peyroux	Impulse!	
30 September	Live at the Greek Theatre	Joe Bonamassa	Provogue	
7 October	Wild	Joanne Shaw Taylor	Axehouse	
14 October	Keepin' the Horse Between Me and the Ground	Seasick Steve	Caroline	
21 October	Keepin' the Horse Between Me and the Ground	Seasick Steve	Caroline	
28 October	Keepin' the Horse Between Me and the Ground	Seasick Steve	Caroline	
4 November	Keepin' the Horse Between Me and the Ground	Seasick Steve	Caroline	
11 November	Day Breaks	Norah Jones	Capitol	
18 November	Day Breaks	Norah Jones	Capitol	
25 November	Take Me to the Alley	Gregory Porter	Blue Note	
2 December	Day Breaks	Norah Jones	Capitol	
9 December	Blue & Lonesome †	The Rolling Stones	Polydor	
16 December	Blue & Lonesome †	The Rolling Stones	Polydor	
23 December	Blue & Lonesome †	The Rolling Stones	Polydor	
30 December	Blue & Lonesome †	The Rolling Stones	Polydor	

== See also ==
- 2016 in British music
