= Kamau Kenyatta =

American musician and educator (born 1955)

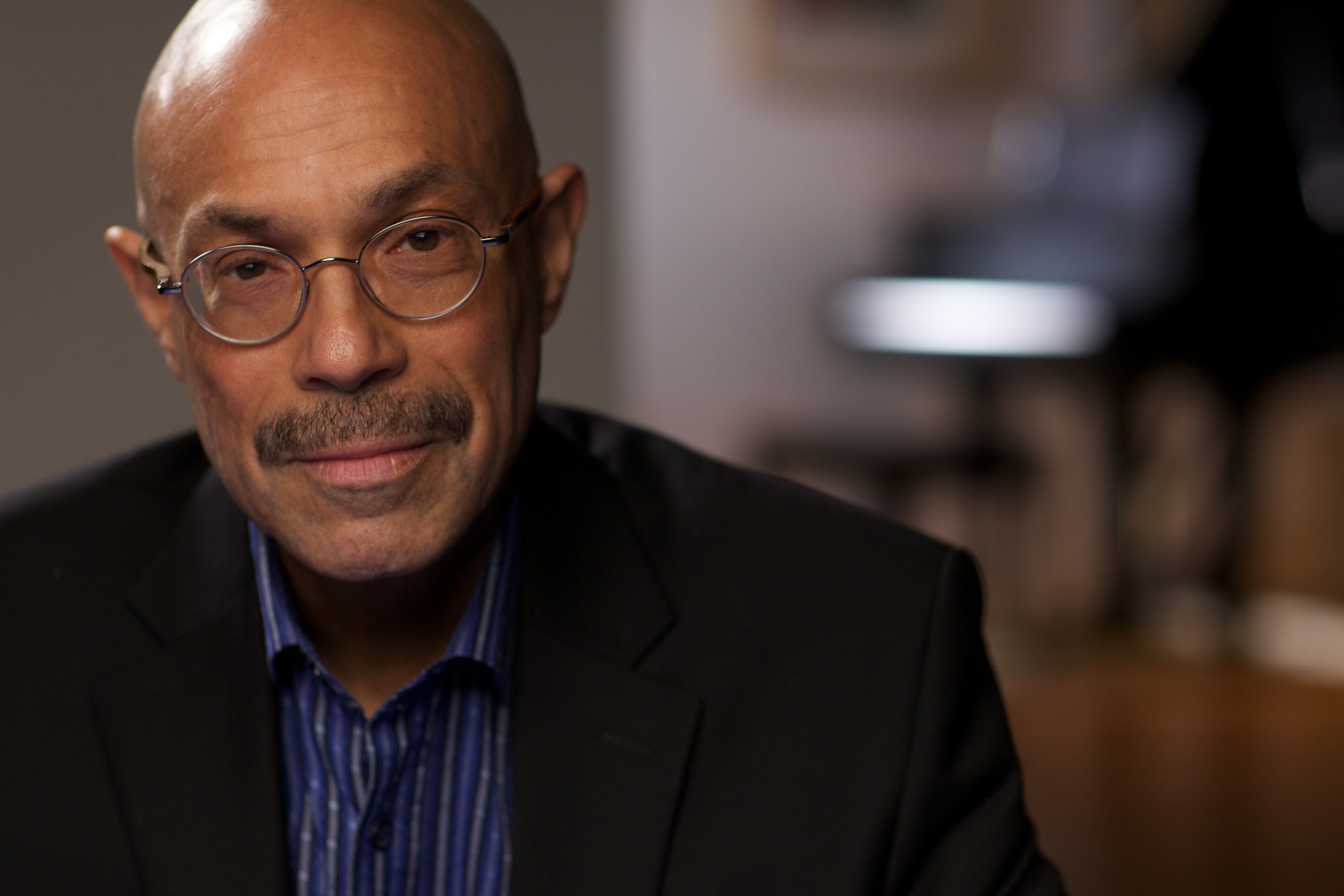
- Kenyatta in 2014

Background information
- Born: June 27, 1955 (age 70); Detroit, Michigan, U.S.
- Genres: Jazz; R&B
- Occupations: Musician; record producer; arranger; film composer; jazz educator
- Instruments: Piano, soprano sax
- Years active: 1972–present

Kamau Kenyatta (born June 27, 1955) is a Grammy Award-winning record producer. He is a musician, arranger, film composer, and educator. He is a Teaching Professor at the University of California, San Diego (UCSD).

== Life and career ==
Kenyatta was born in Detroit, Michigan. A long-time collaborator with vocalist Gregory Porter, Kenyatta produced Porter's debut album Water (2010), which was nominated for a Best Jazz Vocal Album Grammy Award. In 2013, Kenyatta served as associate producer and arranger for Porter's Blue Note Records debut album, Liquid Spirit. In February 2014, the recording won a Grammy Award in the Best Jazz Vocal Album category. In 2016, releases of Kenyatta's productions included Gregory Porter's Take Me to the Alley, Ed Motta's Perpetual Gateways, and Steph Johnson's Music Is Art.

In February 2017, Kenyatta won a Grammy for his co-production of Take Me to the Alley in the Best Jazz Vocal Album category. Production projects released in 2019 include a self-titled album for vocalist Daneen Wilburn and Intuition: Songs From The Minds Of Women for Alicia Olatuja. In 2020, Kenyatta's productions of Paulette McWilliams' A Woman’s Story and Gregory Porter's All Rise were released. Kenyatta's productions of Allan Harris's Kate’s Soulfood and Gregory Porter's Still Rising were released in 2021. Kenyatta directed the recording of horns and background vocals for Ed Motta's 2023 release, Behind The Tea Chronicles.

As a film composer, Kenyatta worked with Hubert Laws to create the score for Small Steps, Big Strides (1997), a Fox network documentary detailing the history of African-American film. Kenyatta also composed the soundtrack for Carroll Parrot Blue's The Dawn at My Back, an interactive memoir that won the Online Film Festival Jury Award for Short Filmmaking New Forms at the 2004 Sundance Film Festival. In 2015, Kenyatta scored the film Spirits of Rebellion by director Zeinabu Irene Davis. In 2016, after the international success of Liquid Spirit, Kenyatta scored the Gregory Porter biopic Don't Forget Your Music. The film was released in the UK in the fall of 2016. Kenyatta released the music from the film under his own name in a project called The Elegant Sadness.

As an educator, Kenyatta has worked since 1999 at the University of California, San Diego (UCSD).

== Discography ==
- Destiny (2007)
- The Elegant Sadness (2019)

== Awards and nominations ==
Educator Awards
Year	Award	Faculty	Location	Result
May 2009	Barbara J. and Paul D. Saltman Distinguished Teaching Award	Kamau Kenyatta	University of California, San Diego (UCSD)	Won

Grammy Awards
Year	Nominated work	Artist	Award	Result
2017	Take Me to the Alley	Gregory Porter	Best Jazz Vocal Album	Won
