= Hey Laura =

Hey Laura may refer to:

- Laura Welsh (born 1986), an English indie pop singer, also known as Hey Laura
- "Hey Laura", a 2013 song by Gregory Porter from the album Liquid Spirit
