= All Rise =

All Rise may refer to:

- All Rise (Blue album), 2001
  - "All Rise" (song), its title song
- All Rise (Naked Raygun album), 1986
- All Rise (Gregory Porter album), 2020
- All Rise (TV series), a 2019 American drama television series
- All Rise: A Joyful Elegy for Fats Waller, a 2014 album by Jason Moran
- All Rise for Julian Clary, a short-lived British game show presented by Julian Clary
- All Rise, an album by Jazz at Lincoln Center Orchestra
- All Rise, an oratorio composed by Wynton Marsalis
- All Rise: Somebodies, Nobodies, and the Politics of Dignity, by Robert W. Fuller

== See also ==
- A phrase uttered when a judge enters a courtroom
  - A catchphrase associated with American baseball player Aaron Judge
