= Be Good (Gregory Porter album) =

Studio album by Gregory Porter
- Released: 15 February 2012
- Recorded: 20–22 June 2011
- Studio: Systems Two Recording Studio, Brooklyn, New York City
- Genre: Jazz
- Length: 1:02:02
- Label: Motéma
- Producer: Brian Bacchus

Gregory Porter chronology
Water (2010)	Be Good (2012)	Liquid Spirit (2013)

Singles from Be Good
- 1. "Be Good (Lion's Song)" Released: 2012; 2. "On My Way to Harlem" Released: 24 April 2012

Professional ratings
Aggregate scores
Source	Rating
Metacritic	89/100
Review scores
Source	Rating
AllMusic	3.5/5 stars
The Guardian	4/5 stars
Jazzwise	5/5 stars
Time Out Dubai	5/5

Be Good is the second studio album by American jazz musician Gregory Porter. It was released through Motéma Music on 15 February 2012. The album charted in Belgium, France and the Netherlands.

== Reception ==
John Fordham of The Guardian commented that Porter's live shows in London "balanced plenty of fizzing, fast music and jazz acrobatics with the honeyed tones of Nat King Cole [...] Much of this largely self-penned set operates at more of a smoulder, exploring that distinctive kind of mellow innocence in Porter's articulate lyrics. However, after half-a-dozen lovesongs and mother-cherishing acclamations (including the lullaby-like title track), a little more muscle becomes desirable." Chris Nickson of AllMusic stated of Porter's a cappella rendition of "God Bless the Child": "It's a daring move, and one that works as it showcases the tenderness in his voice, with an almost liquid quality in the singing, the emotions hinted at rather than laid out. It's a superb climax to a disc that should certainly help Porter's star rise even further."

== Track listing ==
All songs written by Gregory Porter, except where noted.

No.	Title	Length
1.	"Painted on Canvas"	4:45
2.	"Be Good (Lion's Song)"	6:26
3.	"On My Way to Harlem"	7:40
4.	"Real Good Hands"	4:50
5.	"The Way You Want to Live"	4:24
6.	"When Did You Learn"	4:19
7.	"Imitation of Life" (Sammy Fain, Paul Francis Webster)	3:00
8.	"Mother's Song"	6:59
9.	"Our Love"	3:31
10.	"Bling Bling"	6:00
11.	"Work Song" (Nat Adderley, Oscar Brown Jr.)	6:34
12.	"God Bless the Child" (Arthur Herzog Jr., Billie Holiday)	3:34
Total length:		1:02:02

== Personnel ==
- Gregory Porter - vocals
- Chip Crawford - piano (all tracks, except 12)
- Aaron James - bass (exc. 7, 12)
- Emanuel Harrold - drums (exc. 7, 12)
- Yosuke Sato - alto saxophone (2, 3, 6, 8–11)
- Tivon Pennicott - tenor saxophone (2–4, 8, 10, 11)
- Keyon Harrold - trumpet (2–4, 8, 10, 11)
- Kamau Kenyatta - horn arrangements (2–4, 8, 11)

Production

- Brian Bacchus - production
- Mike Marciano - recording
- Liberty Ellman - mixing and mastering
- Rebecca Meek - art direction, design
- Vincent Soyez - photography

== Charts ==
Chart (2012)	Peak position
Belgian Albums (Ultratop Flanders)	149
Belgian Albums (Ultratop Wallonia)	183
Dutch Albums (Album Top 100)	10
French Albums (SNEP)	144

== Release history ==
Region	Date	Format	Label
United Kingdom	15 February 2012	Digital download	Motéma
