= Nat King Cole & Me =

Studio album by Gregory Porter
- Released: October 27, 2017
- Recorded: 2017
- Studios: AIR Studios, London, England; Capitol Studios, Los Angeles, California; Esplande Studios, New Orleans, Louisiana
- Genre: Jazz
- Length: 49:34
- Labels: Blue Note; Decca
- Producer: Vince Mendoza

Gregory Porter chronology
Take Me to the Alley (2016)	Nat King Cole & Me (2017)	All Rise (2020)

Nat King Cole & Me is the fifth studio album by American jazz musician and singer Gregory Porter. He sings songs that were either recorded by or inspired by Nat King Cole, whom Porter has cited as an important part of his childhood and an influence on his career. The tracks were arranged by Vince Mendoza for a 70 piece orchestra and recorded at AIR Studios in London, England. It is the first time Porter recorded with a full orchestra. The album was released by Blue Note Records and Decca Records on October 27, 2017.

Jeff Simon of The Buffalo News compared the album to Both Sides Now by Joni Mitchell. Other reviewers felt Porter's voice was stronger on big band songs rather than the slower numbers.

== Background ==
Porter became aware of the music of Nat King Cole while growing up in Bakersfield, California, during the 1970s, where his mother was a Baptist minister, and in a household from which his father was absent. When he was five or six, Porter wrote a song that he performed for his mother. She told him, "Boy, you sound like Nat King Cole." Her response prompted him to search through his mother's record collection, where he found some of Cole's recordings, and began listening to them.

He has said that Cole's music was a big part of his childhood: "I was listening to Nat as a child, without my father around, these songs they hit me". He has described the album as a personal tribute to Cole, whose "words were the life lessons, words of wisdom and fatherly advice I needed". He has also spoken of the important role Cole played in the African American community, and to his own family: "My mother and grandmother were very proud of him. He was the first black man to have a television show. His image was beautiful, his style was beautiful. This was a different image of a black man."

Porter's musical breakthrough occurred following his appearance in the 2004 semi-autobiographical musical, Nat King Cole & Me, a show that he wrote, and that enjoyed an eight-week run in Colorado. He first had the idea of recording a tribute album to Cole around 25 years before the project eventually came to fruition, but began to seriously plan its recording a year or so before its release. He has said that he mentioned his wish to record an album of Nat King Cole songs to Cole's daughter, Natalie when the pair met at a concert she was giving at London's Royal Albert Hall, and she encouraged him to do it.

The choice of songs, and arrangement took four to six months to complete: "Song choices were the most difficult because Nat King Cole has such a huge discography that we really had to narrow it down and choose. Another challenge was containing my emotions, literally this was just a dream come true, it felt so good." Among the songs chosen for the album were "I Wonder Who My Daddy Is", a song recorded by Cole's brother, Freddy, and "When Love Was King", a song that previously appeared on Porter's 2013 album, Liquid Spirit, and that Porter says was strongly influenced by Nat King Cole: "I literally heard his voice in my head".

Following its release, Nat King Cole & Me entered the UK Albums Chart at number three, Porter's highest debut entry in the UK charts, and his third album to reach the UK top 10. Tracks from the album were featured on the November 5 edition of Music 'til Midnight, a BBC Radio 2 easy listening programme presented by Moira Stuart.

== Reception ==
Professional ratings
Aggregate scores
Source	Rating
Metacritic	71/100
Review scores
Source	Rating
Allmusic	4/5 stars
Clash Music	7/10
The Guardian	2/5 stars
Exeposé	3.5/5 stars
Financial Times	3/5 stars
NARC	4/5
PopMatters	7/10
Sunday Express	3/5 stars
The Telegraph	4/5 stars
The Times	3/5 stars

Giving the album three of five stars, Chris Pearson of The Times praised Nat King Cole & Me: "It took Nat King Cole half his career to graduate from small groups to string orchestras. Gregory Porter has managed it in just five albums... Some of Vince Mendoza's arrangements are so close to the originals that it's a jolt when a different voice enters." Gareth Hipwell of Rolling Stone Australia gave the album a four star rating, declaring "Porter distils the wide-screen cinematic romance of the Forties, Fifties and Sixties, mantling his celebrated, honeyed baritone in glistening updrafts of strings, horns and woodwind". Keith Bruce of The Glasgow Herald wrote that "[Porter] sings the Cole canon superbly [but] the arrangements and production of Vince Mendoza – and the playing of a London studio ensemble – are what really lift this 12-song collection". Bruce also felt that Porter's rendition of The Christmas Song "should certainly be this Yuletide's chart-topper".

The Christian Science Monitor described the album as "a sincere and heartfelt tribute to a musical father figure that only comes up a bit short because Nat King Cole was such a giant". Awarding the album seven out of ten, Will Rosebury of Clash magazine wrote that Nat King Cole & Me "isn't anything groundbreaking [but] is ultimately a well produced and excellently performed tribute album". Writing in The Guardian, John Lewis gave the album two of five stars, feeling that "Mendoza's cloying arrangements for a 70-piece orchestra pay homage to the string-drenched showbiz Cole with a fidelity that is largely pointless", and felt that Porter should have drawn from Cole's 1940s Capitol Records repertoire rather than choosing songs from his later career. Mike Hobart of The Financial Times gave the album a three of five stars rating, suggesting that "clear diction, a powerful voice and true pitch mirror Cole and bring each song to life", but he felt Porter's voice was better suited to the big band numbers such as "L-O-V-E".

Awarding three of five stars, Andy Gill of The Independent echoed other thoughts that the big band tracks were more powerful, suggesting that "Though obviously sincere and heartfelt, Gregory Porter's tribute to his greatest influence falls a touch short in some cases. His voice, while smooth and warm, lacks the silky, creamy timbre of Cole's". Nate Chinen of National Public Radio wrote that Porter "gives us precise, persuasive and courtly renditions of the songs you'd most expect to see on an essential Cole playlist", and had mixed views about the choice of tracks. Martin Townsend of the Sunday Express also rated the album three out of five, feeling that the quality of Porter's voice depended on the pace of the songs: "though Porter turns in breezy and rather beautiful versions of the faster, jazzier, parts of his repertoire, such as "L-O-V-E" and "Pick Yourself Up", he struggles a bit on the slow vocal elongations of "Mona Lisa" and "Smile"."

Writing for The Buffalo News, Jeff Simon awarded Nat King Cole & Me three and a half stars out of five, and compared the album with Joni Mitchell's Both Sides Now, a project on which Mendoza was also the arranger, and that Simon calls "a magnificent disc that showed generations of female world-beating jazz singers everything they were doing wrong". Mendoza's involvement with Porter's album is something Simon believes "makes it a far more brilliant exploration of Nat "King" Cole's repertoire than anyone had any right to expect".

Christopher Loudon of JazzTimes wrote "Fittingly, Porter’s long affection for Nat “King” Cole provides the foundation for his first full-length exploration of pop and jazz classics. That Porter and Cole are kindred spirits is undeniable: both warm, enthralling baritones; both blessed with tremendous, infectious charm".

== Track listing ==
Nat King Cole & Me track listing
No.	Title	Writer(s)	Length
1.	"Mona Lisa"	Jay Livingston; Ray Evans	4:19
2.	"Smile"	Charles Chaplin; Geoffrey Parsons; John Turner	4:18
3.	"Nature Boy"	Eden Ahbez	3:45
4.	"L-O-V-E"	Bert Kaempfert; Milt Gabler	2:09
5.	"Quizas, Quizas, Quizas"	Farres Osvaldo	4:31
6.	"Miss Otis Regrets"	Cole Porter	4:31
7.	"Pick Yourself Up"	Dorothy Fields; Jerome Kern	3:12
8.	"When Love Was King"	Gregory Porter	7:44
9.	"The Lonely One"	Lenny Hambro; Roberta Heller	4:34
10.	"Ballerina"	Bob Russell; Carl Sigman	2:54
11.	"I Wonder Who My Daddy Is"	Gladys Shelley	3:48
12.	"The Christmas Song"	Mel Tormé; Robert Wells	3:46

Deluxe edition bonus tracks
No.	Title	Writer(s)	Length
12.	"But Beautiful"	Jimmy Van Heusen; Johnny Burke	4:33
13.	"Sweet Lorraine"	Cliff Burwell; Mitchell Parish	3:36
14.	"For All We Know"	J. Fred Coots; Sam M. Lewis	5:33
15.	"The Christmas Song"	Mel Tormé; Robert Wells	3:46

== Personnel ==
- Gregory Porter – vocals
- Terence Blanchard – trumpet (tracks 4 and 15)
- Christian Sands – piano
- Reuben Rogers – bass
- Ulysses Owens – drums
- Vince Mendoza – arrangement

== Charts ==
=== Weekly charts ===
Weekly chart performance for Nat King Cole & Me
Chart (2017)	Peak position
Austrian Albums (Ö3 Austria)	5
Belgian Albums (Ultratop Flanders)	21
Belgian Albums (Ultratop Wallonia)	35
Dutch Albums (Album Top 100)	12
French Albums (SNEP)	20
German Albums (Offizielle Top 100)	17
Irish Albums (IRMA)	5
Italian Albums (FIMI)	80
Portuguese Albums (AFP)	12
Scottish Albums (Official Charts)	3
Spanish Albums (Promusicae)	34
Swiss Albums (Schweizer Hitparade)	22
UK Albums (Official Charts)	3
US Top Jazz Albums (Billboard)	1

=== Year-end charts ===
Year-end chart performance for Nat King Cole & Me
Chart (2017)	Position
UK Albums (OCC)	21
