= Issues of Life: Features and Remixes =

Compilation album by Gregory Porter
- Released: September 15, 2014
- Genre: Vocal jazz; jazz, R&B
- Length: 68:53
- Label: Membran; Must Have Jazz

Gregory Porter chronology
Liquid Spirit (2013)	Issues of Life: Features and Remixes (2014)	Take Me to the Alley (2016)

Issues of Life: Features and Remixes is a compilation album by American jazz musician and singer Gregory Porter.

Issues of Life: Features and Remixes was released after Grammy-winning Liquid Spirit (2013). The album brings together disparate tracks recorded prior to signing contract with Blue Note Records and "displays much of what has made him such a jazz superstar".

== Reception ==
Professional ratings
Review scores
Source	Rating
AllMusic	3.5/5 stars
Financial Times	4/5 stars
The Guardian	3/5 stars
The Irish Times	4/5 stars

Jazz critic John Fordham from The Guardian highlighted a "muscular, horn-heavy" version of Bobby Timmons' "Moanin'", described "Be My Monster Love" as "soulful and coolly bass-walking" and "Hope Is a Thing with Feathers" as a "smokily wondering immigant-song". He added that it was recorded with David Murray, describing him as a "post-Coltrane tenor-sax supremo".

Jazz critic Mike Hobart from Financial Times called Issues of Life: Features and Remixes a "terrific introduction to the Porter aesthetic".

== Track listing ==
No.	Title	Length
1.	"Moanin' (Radio Edit)" (Gregory Porter, Paul Zauner's Blue Brass)	3:32
2.	"Be My Monster Love" (Gregory Porter, David Murray Infinity Quartet)	8:01
3.	"Issues of Life" (Gregory Porter, Zbonics)	5:26
4.	"About the Children" (Gregory Porter, David Murray Infinity Quartet)	7:48
5.	"Just in Time" (Gregory Porter, Zbonics)	4:53
6.	"Hope Is a Thing with Feathers" (Gregory Porter, David Murray Infinity Quartet)	7:16
7.	"Nowhere to Run" (Gregory Porter, Zbonics)	3:50
8.	"She Danced Across the Floor (Automart Remix)" (Gregory Porter, Zbonics)	3:55
9.	"1960 What? (Opolopo Kick and Bass Rerub)" (Gregory Porter)	8:24
10.	"Army of the Faithful (Joyful Noise)" (Gregory Porter, David Murray Infinity Quartet)	6:18
11.	"She's Gone" (Gregory Porter, Zbonics)	5:16
12.	"Song of the Wind" (Gregory Porter, M1, Brian Jackson, The New Midnight Band)	4:14
Total length:		68:53
