= Annual Charlie Parker Celebration =

Annual music festival in Kansas City, MO

The Annual Charlie Parker Celebration is an annual festival held in Kansas City, Missouri, since 2014, celebrating legendary jazz saxophonist Charlie Parker. It is held for 10 days in August and celebrates all aspects of Parker from live jazz music shows and boot camps, to tours of his haunts in the city, to exhibits at the American Jazz Museum. During the 2nd celebration in 2015, the museum featured rare programs, album sleeves, a pocket watch and cuff links that belonged to “The Bird” himself.

In 2016, saxophonist Tivon Pennicott was artist-in-residence at the festival. A 21-sax salute was made to Parker at his gravesite. The 2016 event was attended by about 300 people and unites numerous interests, with supporters including the Office of Culture and Creative Services and the Neighborhood Tourist Development Fund.
