= Take Me to the Alley =

2016 studio album by Gregory Porter

Studio album by Gregory Porter
- Released: May 6, 2016
- Recorded: September 28 – October 1, 2015
- Studio: Capitol Studio B, Hollywood; Sear Sound, New York City
- Genre: Jazz
- Length: 51:18
- Label: Blue Note
- Producer: Gregory Porter; Kamau Kenyatta

Gregory Porter chronology
| Issues of Life: Features and Remixes (2014) | Take Me to the Alley (2016) | Nat King Cole & Me (2017) |

Singles from Take Me to the Alley
- 1. "Don't Lose Your Steam" Released: 2016

Professional ratings
Aggregate scores
| Source | Rating |
|---|---|
| AnyDecentMusic? | 7.6/10 |
| Metacritic | 81/100 |
Review scores
| Source | Rating |
| All About Jazz | 4.5/5 stars |
| AllMusic | 3.5/5 stars |
| The Telegraph | 4/5 stars |
| Exeposé | 4/5 stars |
| The Guardian | 4/5 stars |
| Irish Examiner | 4/5 |
| The Irish Times | 4/5 stars |
| The National | 4/5 stars |
| Pitchfork | 6.7/10 |
| PopMatters | 9/10 |

Take Me to the Alley is the fourth studio album by Gregory Porter, released on May 6, 2016, through Blue Note Records. It earned Porter a 2017 Grammy Award for Best Jazz Vocal Album.

The album was recorded in Hollywood and New York City between September and October 2015. Porter worked alongside producer Kamau Kenyatta, with whom he first worked in the mid-1990s when he was a student at San Diego State University. Porter observed: "Kamau has been most instrumental in taking what I have and refining it... he's been great at offering encouragement to what I already have artistically."

== Reception ==
Writing for The Guardian, Alexis Petridis said:

... for all its easiness on the ear, – and there are moments when listening Take Me to the Alley feels like being mugged by a syrup sponge pudding – there’s something weirdly uncompromising about Porter’s music. He doesn’t bother with glossy production: Take Me to the Alley sounds fantastic, but that’s down to the warm spontaneity of an album that seems to have been recorded in six days. Nor does he dabble in radio-friendly pop covers – no scat-singing interpreter of the Coldplay songbook he. His own compositions proudly display his gospel roots – not the first genre you’d think of flaunting were you desperate for mainstream success. The title track offers up a parable about the second coming of Christ, its sternness at odds with the pacific piano playing and Alicia Olatuja's pillowy backing vocals; "In Heaven" undercuts the small hours loveliness of its muted trumpet with a lyric by Porter's cousin about death and redemption.

== Track listing ==
All songs written by Gregory Porter, except where noted. Arrangements by Porter, Chip Crawford and Kamau Kenyatta, horns arranged by Kenyatta and Keyon Harrold.

| No. | Title | Length |
|---|---|---|
| 1. | "Holding On" (Gregory Porter, James John Napier, Guy William Lawrence and Howard John Lawrence) | 5:01 |
| 2. | "Don't Lose Your Steam" | 3:17 |
| 3. | "Take Me to the Alley" | 5:16 |
| 4. | "Day Dream" (Gregory Porter and Craig Dawson) | 3:51 |
| 5. | "Consequence of Love" | 3:20 |
| 6. | "In Fashion" | 4:34 |
| 7. | "More Than a Woman" | 3:31 |
| 8. | "In Heaven" (Darlene Andrews) | 4:18 |
| 9. | "Insanity" | 5:37 |
| 10. | "Don't Be a Fool" | 4:31 |
| 11. | "Fan the Flames" | 4:12 |
| 12. | "French African Queen" | 3:44 |
| Total length: | | 51:18 |

=== Deluxe edition bonus tracks ===
| No. | Title | Length |
|---|---|---|
| 13. | "Holding On" (featuring Kem) | 4.16 |
| 14. | "Insanity" (featuring Lalah Hathaway) | 5.03 |
| 15. | "Don't Lose Your Steam" (Fred Falke remix) | 3:15 |
| Total length: | | 63:51 |

=== DVD bonus tracks ===
1. "Take Me to the Alley" (EPK) – 6:33
2. "Don't Lose Your Steam" (Official Video) – 3:17
3. The Making of "Don't Lose Your Steam" – 2:04
4. "Don't Lose Your Steam" (1 Mic 1 Take) – 3:28
5. "Holding On" (1 Mic 1 Take), featuring Kem – 4:10
6. Don Was Interview (#"Take Me to the Alley") – 19:31

== Personnel ==
- Voice – Gregory Porter
- Piano – Chip Crawford
- Bass – Aaron James
- Drums – Emanuel Harrold
- Alto saxophone – Yosuke Sato
- Tenor saxophone – Tivon Pennicott
- Trumpet – Keyon Harrold
- Organ – Ondřej Pivec
- Voice – Alicia Olatuja

Production

- Producers – Gregory Porter, Kamau Kenyatta
- Recording engineer – Jay Newland (at Sear Sound, NYC), Charlie Paakkari (at Capitol Studio B, LA)
- Assistant engineers – Grant Valentine and Richie Kennon (at Sear Sound)
- Mixing – Jay Newland (at Capitol Studio B)

Additional musicians on Deluxe Edition's bonus tracks

- Guest vocals – Kem ("Holding On"), Lalah Hathaway ("Insanity")
- Bass, keyboard – Demetrius Nabors ("Holding On")
- Guitar – Darrell Crooks ("Insanity")
- Remix – Rex Rideout ("Insanity"), Fred Falke ("Don't Loose Your Steam")

DVD

- Piano trio at Capitol Studio A on tracks 4 and 5 – Chip Crawford, Jahmal Nichols (bass), and Emanuel Harrold
- Guest vocals on 5 – Kem
- Video directors – Ali Muhammad (1), Nayip Ramos (2, 3), Possum Hill (4–6)
- Video producers – Thoro NYC (1), Decca Records France (2, 3), Daylan Williams (4–6)

== Charts ==
=== Weekly charts ===
| Chart (2016–17) | Peak position |
|---|---|
| Australian Albums (ARIA) | 65 |
| Austrian Albums (Ö3 Austria) | 11 |
| Belgian Albums (Ultratop Flanders) | 8 |
| Belgian Albums (Ultratop Wallonia) | 30 |
| Dutch Albums (Album Top 100) | 5 |
| French Albums (SNEP) | 14 |
| German Albums (Offizielle Top 100) | 8 |
| Italian Albums (FIMI) | 31 |
| New Zealand Heatseekers Albums (RMNZ) | 1 |
| Portuguese Albums (AFP) | 33 |
| Spanish Albums (PROMUSICAE) | 34 |
| Swiss Albums (Schweizer Hitparade) | 11 |
| UK Albums (OCC) | 5 |
| US Billboard 200 | 82 |
| US Top Jazz Albums (Billboard) | 1 |
| US Top R&B/Hip-Hop Albums (Billboard) | 8 |

=== Year-end charts ===
| Chart (2016) | Position |
|---|---|
| Belgian Albums (Ultratop Flanders) | 83 |
| Dutch Albums (Album Top 100) | 81 |
| French Albums (SNEP) | 155 |
| UK Albums (OCC) | 65 |
| US Top Jazz Albums (Billboard) | 8 |

| Chart (2017) | Position |
|---|---|
| US Top Jazz Albums (Billboard) | 8 |

=== Certifications ===
| Region | Certification | Certified units/sales |
|---|---|---|
| Germany (BVMI) | 4× Platinum | 80,000^{^} |
^{^} Shipments figures based on certification alone.
