= Water (Gregory Porter album) =

Studio album by Gregory Porter
- Released: May 11, 2010
- Recorded: August 19–20, 2009
- Studio: 58 North Six Media Lab, Brooklyn, New York City
- Genre: Jazz; blues; rhythm and blues
- Length: 68:57
- Label: Motéma (MTM-41)
- Producer: Kamau Kenyatta

Gregory Porter chronology
Water (2010)	Be Good (2012)

Water is the debut studio album by American jazz musician Gregory Porter. It was released under the Motéma Music label on May 11, 2010.

== Critical reception ==
Professional ratings
Review scores
Source	Rating
AllMusic	3.5/5 stars
All About Jazz	4/5 stars

Christopher Loudon of JazzTimes stated "The intersection of Kurt Elling and Sammy Davis Jr. may seem an unfathomable junction, but that’s precisely where you’ll find Gregory Porter. On his debut album, consisting largely of original tunes that are as uniformly impressive as his sound, Porter takes the best of Davis-the superior interpretive skills, clarion tone and immaculate diction that were too often overwhelmed by staginess-and marries it to the best of Elling, complete with some solid scatting".

Phil Johnson of The Independent wrote "Tipped by Jamie Cullum as one to watch, Porter is a deep-voiced vocalist from Bakersfield, California. There's an obvious debt to Kurt Elling but Porter seems relatively unbound by technique, sounding less mannered and more soulful as a result".

== Commercial reception ==
As of June 2017, the album is ranked number 27 in Jazz digital albums on Amazon.

Kevin Le Grande of BBC Music noted that "Gregory Porter has a voice and musicality to be reckoned with" and that Mr. Porter could help fill the gap of new male African-American jazz singers. Howard Dukes of Soul Tracks claims Gregory Porter as a new talent, "an artist who has a number of classic, familiar elements in his style, but whose approach brings a freshness that both jazz and soul fans should love" and continues with praise: "I think Nat King Cole would be pleased."

== Track listing ==
All songs written by Gregory Porter, except where noted.

No.	Title	Writer(s)	Length
1.	"Illusion"		3:02
2.	"Pretty"		6:19
3.	"Magic Cup"		6:11
4.	"Skylark"	Hoagy Carmichael; Johnny Mercer	8:17
5.	"Black Nile"	Wayne Shorter	4:55
6.	"Wisdom"	Daniel Jackson; Gregory Porter	9:30
7.	"1960 What?"		12:26
8.	"But Beautiful"	Jimmy van Heusen; Johnny Burke	5:34
9.	"Lonely One"		5:41
10.	"Water"		4:01
11.	"Feeling Good"	Anthony Newley; Leslie Bricusse	3:01
Total length:			68:57

== Personnel ==
Featured artists

- Gregory Porter – vocals, arrangements
- James Spaulding – alto saxophone
- Chip Crawford – piano, arrangements

Production

- Kamau Kenyatta – production
