= All Rise (Gregory Porter album) =

Studio album by Gregory Porter
- Released: August 28, 2020
- Genres: Jazz; soul; gospel
- Length: 61:25
- Labels: Blue Note; Decca
- Producers: Troy Miller; Kamau Kenyatta

Gregory Porter chronology
Nat King Cole & Me (2017)	All Rise (2020)	Christmas Wish (2023)

All Rise is the sixth studio album by American jazz musician and singer Gregory Porter, released on August 28, 2020, through Blue Note and Decca Records. It was produced by Troy Miller and Kamau Kenyatta and charted across Europe. The album was nominated for the "Best R&B Album Award" at the 63rd Annual Grammy Awards.

== Critical reception ==
Professional ratings
Review scores
Source	Rating
AllMusic	4.5/5 stars
The Arts Desk	4/5 stars
Evening Standard	4/5 stars
Hot Press	8/10
Jazz Journal	5/5 stars
Jazzwise	4/5 stars
Laut.de	4/5 stars
Mojo	3/5 stars
PopMatters	9/10
Tom Hull	B+

AllMusic's Matt Collar wrote that Porter "has the kind of warm, enveloping voice that just seems to flow forever" on the album, on which Porter "returns to his original, crossover blend of vintage-inspired soul, jazz, and pop". Collar also felt that the producers add "just the right amount of organic textures and old-school grooves to the singer's already evocative songs". Semassa Boko of PopMatters stated that "while the sounds vary throughout the album, the songs share a lush, soothing, self-assured energy", calling it "an album full of layered production and performances" on which "Porter crafts tender sonic scenes of intimacy". Louder Than War's Paul Clarke described All Rise as "a joyous, smart mix of jazz, soul and old school gospel" that "proves [Porter] is a skilled songwriter who can tell a story". Rachel McGrath of the Evening Standard concurred, summarizing it as "a reminder of his incredible songwriting ability, as his lyrics boast a depth to match his famous vocals".

Tanis Smither of Hot Press found that "epic, joyous choruses and Porter's distinctive timbre – in turns silky smooth and throaty – are both present in full, resplendent form". Reviewing the album for The Arts Desk, Sebastian Scotney felt that Porter as a songwriter "brings satisfying variety, both emotional and stylistic" and complimented the contributions of the musicians, particularly producer and instrumentalist Troy Miller. Peter Quinn of Jazzwise opined that the "textural palette is pleasingly varied throughout, with a horn section, 10-strong choir plus the London Symphony Orchestra strings all being judiciously brought into play".

== Track listing ==
All tracks are written by Gregory Porter, except "Revival Song" and "Revival", written by Porter, Troy Miller and Oliver Rockberger.

All Rise track listing
No.	Title	Length
1.	"Concorde"	3:54
2.	"Dad Gone Thing"	5:01
3.	"Revival Song"	3:35
4.	"If Love Is Overrated"	5:53
5.	"Faith in Love"	4:56
6.	"Merchants of Paradise"	6:02
7.	"Long List of Troubles"	4:14
8.	"Mister Holland"	3:24
9.	"Modern Day Apprentice"	2:53
10.	"Everything You Touch Is Gold"	6:03
11.	"Phoenix"	4:45
12.	"Merry Go Round"	5:26
13.	"Thank You"	5:19
Total length:		61:25

Digital edition bonus track
No.	Title	Length
14.	"Revival"	3:06
Total length:		64:31

Deluxe edition bonus tracks
No.	Title	Length
13.	"Real Truth"	6:36
14.	"You Can Join My Band"	5:50
15.	"Thank You"	5:19
Total length:		73:51

== Charts ==
Chart performance for All Rise
Chart (2020)	Peak position
Austrian Albums (Ö3 Austria)	3
Belgian Albums (Ultratop Flanders)	9
Belgian Albums (Ultratop Wallonia)	7
Dutch Albums (Album Top 100)	6
French Albums (SNEP)	8
German Albums (Offizielle Top 100)	8
Irish Albums (IRMA)	25
Portuguese Albums (AFP)	11
Scottish Albums (Official Charts)	2
Spanish Albums (Promusicae)	63
Swiss Albums (Schweizer Hitparade)	9
UK Albums (Official Charts)	3
US Top Jazz Albums (Billboard)	2
