= Alicia Olatuja =

American opera singer

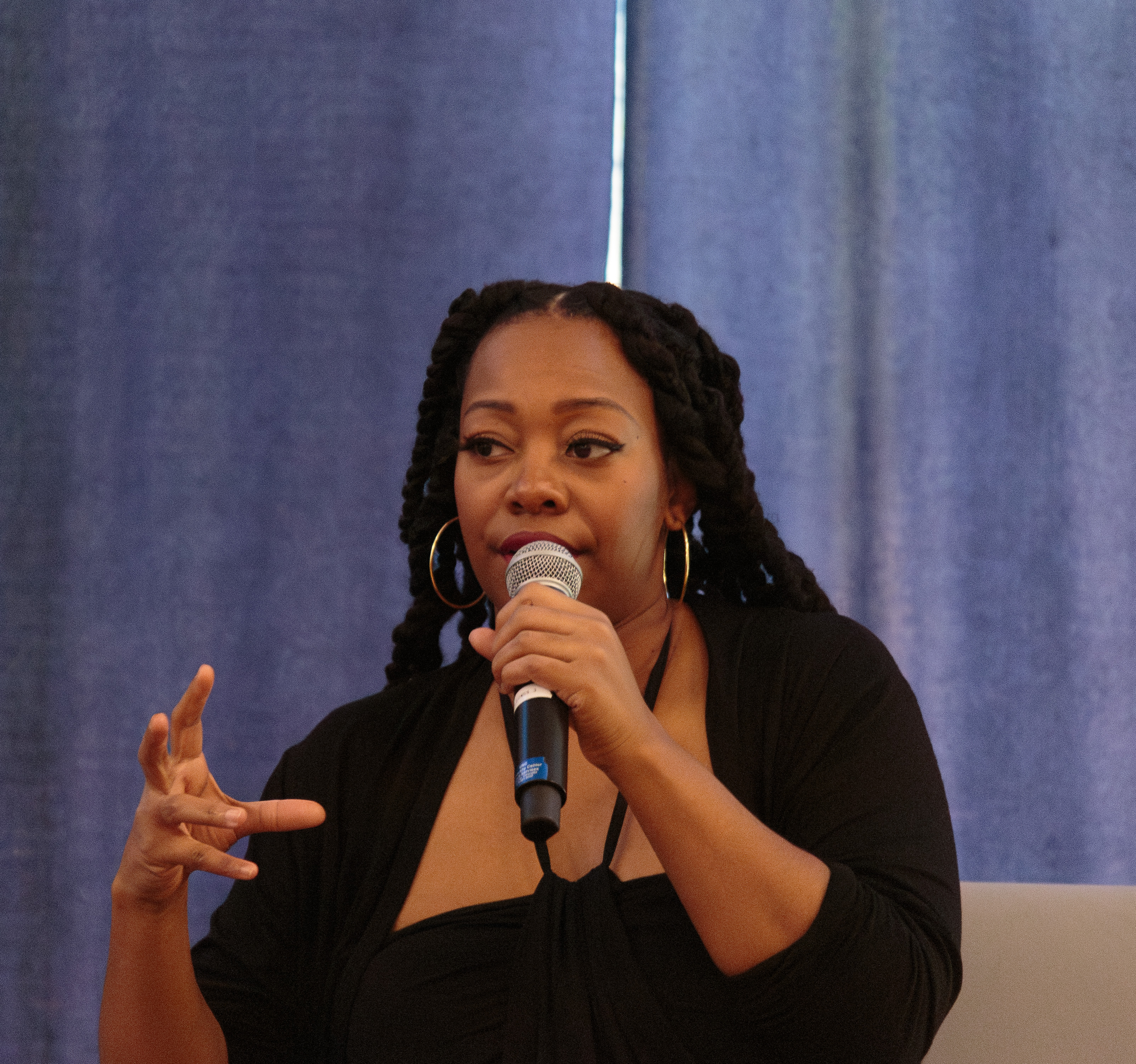
- Olatuja in 2026
- Born: June 16; Washington
- Occupation: Singer
- Website: www.aliciaolatuja.com

Alicia Olatuja is a mezzo-soprano and graduate of the Manhattan School of Music. She has made her professional debut as Sacagawea at the Opera Memphis and at Carnegie Hall, UVA, and The Kennedy Center. She has sung with the Brooklyn Tabernacle Choir since 2007.

== Early life ==
Born in Washington State, Olatuja moved to Oregon and then settled in St. Louis with her family when she was 5 years old. Growing up, she started developing her voice in church and found inspiration from Whitney Houston. She was supported by her grandmother, Lucille Mitchell, who was a head elder at their church, as well as her mother Valencia who had a singing voice of her own.

Olatuja remembers traveling across Missouri, namely to Kansas City, for church music retreats. She sang her first solo in church when she was 9 years old and by the time she was in middle school, she was able to read and sing music from prolific composers including Handel and Mozart.

=== Education ===
Olatuja originally majored in veterinary medicine before deciding to pursue a music degree at the University of Missouri. She graduated with her undergraduate degree from the School of Music, then pursued her masters at the Manhattan School of Music. Her studies in classical voice/opera and being on stage “instantly felt at home” for her.

== Career ==
=== U.S. 2013 inauguration ceremony ===
On January 21, 2013, Olatuja performed a solo during “Battle Hymn of The Republic” with the Brooklyn Tabernacle Choir at President Barack Obama’s second inauguration. She was given 10 days to prepare for an event that approximately one million people attended. While she couldn’t recall what she saw more than how the event made her feel, this performance helped gain Olatuja international attention.

=== Albums ===
She had released an album The Promise in the preceding January, as the Olatuja Project, with her Nigerian-born husband Michael Olatuja, himself a successful jazz bassist. Alicia sang some Nigerian lyrics, including in the Yoruba language. Later that year she released "In The Dark" as a single, and the next year included it in her album Timeless. In 2019 she released Intuition: Songs from the Minds of Women.

=== Other performances ===
Alicia performed at the Monterey Jazz Festival in 2017. She tours extensively, performs vocal arranging as well as singing, and operates the on-line Vocal Breakthrough Academy, an adaptation to the disruption of the COVID-19 pandemic.

She sings “Pilgrimage” on track 6 of Dr. Lonnie Smith's 2021 CD Breathe (Blue Note Records).
