= Tivon Pennicott =

American jazz saxophonist and composer

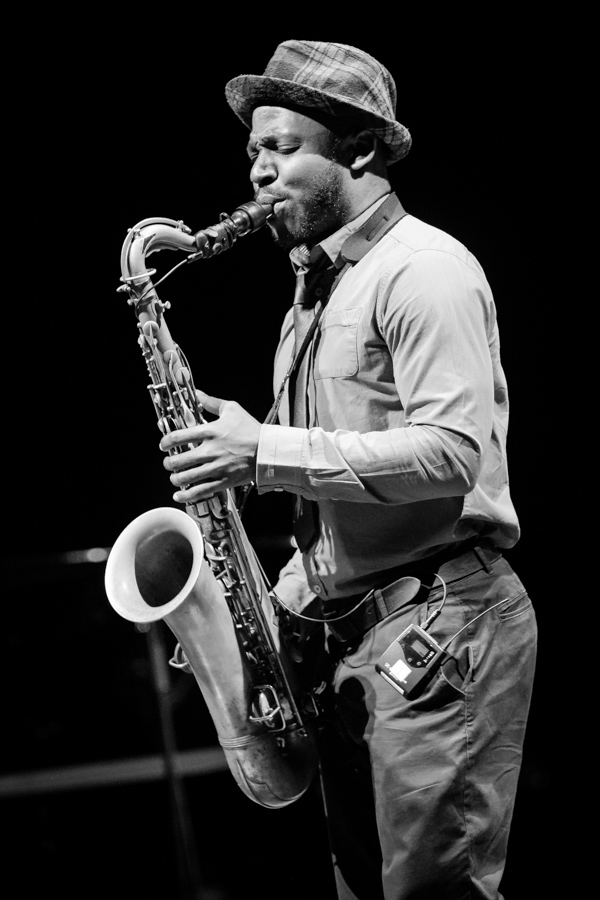
- Pennicott at the Kongsberg Jazzfestival, 2018

Background information
- Origin: Marietta, Georgia, U.S.
- Genres: Jazz
- Occupations: Musician; composer
- Instrument: Tenor saxophone
- Years active: 2000s–present
- Member of: Sound Quartet
- Website: tivonpennicott.com

Tivon Pennicott is an American jazz saxophonist and composer.

== Early life and career ==
Of Jamaican parentage, Pennicott grew up in Marietta, Georgia, but moved to Miami, Florida, where he studied music at the University of Miami. On a visit in Los Angeles, he met and was invited to perform with Kenny Burrell, who was a major influence on him. He later recorded on Burrell's album Be Yourself, recorded live in Jazz at Lincoln Center at Dizzy's Club on September 9, 2008. Pennicott then moved to New York City in late 2009, where he formed the Sound Quartet with pianist Mike Battaglia, bassist Spencer Murphy, and drummer Kenneth Salters. These members are featured on his debut album, Lover of Nature, which was released in November 2014. In 2018, Pennicott was on drummer Ari Hoenig's album NY Standard.

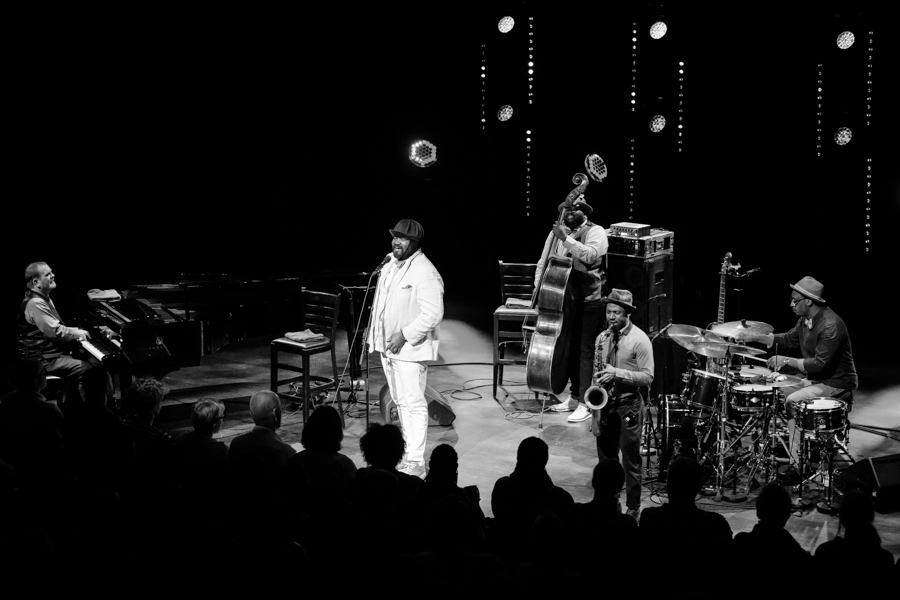
Pennicott with Gregory Porter at the Kongsberg Jazzfestival, 2018. From left: Chip Crawford, Porter, Jahmal Nichols, Pennicott, and Emanuel Harrold.

Pennicott released his sophomore recording in the fall of 2020, Spirit Garden (New Phrase Records), having produced, orchestrated, composed, and performed with and for a 26-piece string orchestra alongside several combinations of a chordless quartet. Joe Saylor, Philip Dizack, Yasushi Nakamura, Dominique Sanders, Olivier Glissant, and Yoojin Park were also contributors to the record. The album was recorded to tape at Studio G in Brooklyn and Dreamland Recording Studios in Hurley, New York. It was mixed by Russell Elevado and mastered by Alex DeTurk.

As of September 2021, he has been a contributor to three Grammys: one with Esperanza Spalding and two with Gregory Porter. He is also the second-place winner of the Thelonious Monk Institute of Jazz competition held in 2013 (now the Herbie Hancock Institute of Jazz).

Since early 2016, he has been performing full-time with singer Gregory Porter, while also continuing his artist-in-residence at the Annual Charlie Parker Celebration in Kansas City, Missouri.

In 2024, he released the album Roots to Branches on Dox Records.
