= Liquid Spirit =

Studio album by Gregory Porter
- Released: September 2, 2013
- Recorded: 2013
- Studio: Sear Sound, New York City
- Genre: Jazz; blues; rhythm and blues
- Length: 61:15
- Label: Blue Note
- Producer: Brian Bacchus

Gregory Porter chronology
Be Good (2012)	Liquid Spirit (2013)	Issues of Life: Features and Remixes (2014)

Singles from Liquid Spirit
- 1. "Musical Genocide" Released: 2013; 2. "The 'In' Crowd" Released: 2014; 3. "No Love Dying" Released: 2014; 4. "Liquid Spirit" Released: 2015; 5. "Hey Laura" Released: 2015; 6. "Water Under Bridges" Released: 2015

Professional ratings
Review scores
Source	Rating
All About Jazz	4.5/5 stars
AllMusic	4/5 stars
Contactmusic.com	4.5/5 stars
Daily Express	4/5
Financial Times	4/5 stars
The Galleon	8/10
The Guardian	3/5 stars
laut.de	4/5 stars
PopMatters	8/10 stars
The Sydney Morning Herald	4/5 stars

Liquid Spirit is the third studio album by American jazz musician Gregory Porter. It was released through Blue Note Records on September 2, 2013. The album won the Grammy Award for Best Jazz Vocal Album in 2014. The record also produced six singles.

== Critical reception ==
John Fordham of The Guardian stated 'It's a better balanced Porter album than formerly, and as classily polished and confident as is usual from Blue Note." Will Layman of PopMatters commented "Gregory Porter is now flat-out in the jazz spotlight. Where he deserves to be. What that means, commercially, in 2013 may be limited. But now that he is recording for the art form's marquis label, Porter has the chance to change the art, to enrich the audience, to sing from a higher mountaintop. Liquid Spirit is a beautiful extension of that clarion cry." Thom Jurek of AllMusic added "While his first two recordings revealed a major new talent with their promise, Liquid Spirit is a giant step forward artistically, and for the listener, an exercise in musical inspiration." The Independent's Phil Johnson noted "The soulful vocalist follows his two excellent indie albums with a major-label debut that contains few surprises yet deepens the story so far". Mike Hobart of Financial Times wrote "Gregory Porter ’s largely self-penned major label debut is an artful and free-spirited blend of love songs, social commentary and reflections on life... The lyrics are heart-on-sleeve, and occasionally odd, but Porter's rich baritone oozes confidence and brings each syllable life".

== Commercial reception ==
The album entered the US Billboard 200 at No. 192 with around 3,000 copies sold, and peaked at No. 187 on the chart. It peaked at No. 2 on Jazz Albums. The album has sold 43,000 copies in the US as of April 2016.

In the United Kingdom, the album peaked at No. 9 in the chart, and it was certified Platinum by the BPI on July 8, 2016.

== Track listing ==
All songs written by Gregory Porter, and arranged by Porter, Chip Crawford and Kamau Kenyatta, except where noted. Horns arranged by Kamau Kenyatta.

No.	Title	Length
1.	"No Love Dying"	3:56
2.	"Liquid Spirit"	3:36
3.	"Lonesome Lover" (Abbey Lincoln, Max Roach)	3:11
4.	"Water Under Bridges"	3:32
5.	"Hey Laura"	3:19
6.	"Musical Genocide"	3:45
7.	"Wolfcry"	4:10
8.	"Free" (Zak Najor, Gregory Porter)	5:01
9.	"Brown Grass"	4:17
10.	"Wind Song"	3:23
11.	"The 'In' Crowd" (Billy Page)	3:37
12.	"Movin'"	4:49
13.	"When Love Was King"	6:52
14.	"I Fall in Love Too Easily" (Sammy Cahn, Jule Styne)	7:47
Total length:		61:15

2013 Deluxe Edition bonus tracks / Japanese Edition bonus tracks

No.	Title	Length
15.	"Time is Ticking"	3:23
16.	"Water Under Bridges" (Robato Version)	4:43
Total length:		69:21

2014 Deluxe Edition bonus tracks

No.	Title	Length
15.	"Water Under Bridges" (featuring Laura Mvula)	3:57
16.	"Don't Let Me Be Misunderstood" (featuring Jamie Cullum)	2:50
17.	"Grandma's Hands" (featuring Ben l'Oncle Soul)	3:32
18.	"Liquid Spirit" (20Syl Remix)	3:25
Total length:		74:59

2014 Deluxe Edition Bonus DVD

No.	Title	Length
1.	"Grandma's Hands" (Live)	5:49
2.	"Hoochie Coochie Man" (Live)	5:15
3.	"She Was Too Good to Me" (Live)	4:43
4.	"Someday We'll All Be Free" (Live)	6:02
5.	"Work Song" (Live)	7:40
Total length:		29:29

2015 Special Edition bonus tracks

No.	Title	Length
15.	"When You Wish Upon A Star"	3:48
16.	"Liquid Spirit" (Claptone Remix – Full Vocal Version)	2:44
17.	"Puttin' On The Ritz"	3:06
18.	"Fly Me to the Moon (In Other Words)" (with Julie London)	2:41
19.	"Don't Let Me Be Misunderstood" (Jamie Cullum featuring Gregory Porter)	2:58
Total length:		76:32

== Personnel ==
Featured artists

- Gregory Porter – vocals
- Chip Crawford – piano
- Aaron James – bass (all tracks, except 4, 7)
- Emanuel Harrold – drums (exc. 4, 7, 14)
- Yosuke Sato – alto saxophone (1–3, 6, 8, 10, 12)
- Tivon Pennicott – tenor saxophone (2, 3, 5, 6, 8, 10, 12)
- Curtis Taylor – trumpet (2, 3, 6, 8, 10, 12)
- Glenn Patscha – Hammond B3 organ (5, 6, 8), Fender Rhodes (6)

Production

- Brian Bacchus – production
- Kamau Kenyatta – associate producer
- Jay Newland – recording, mixing
- Ted Tuthill, Owen Mulholland – assistant engineers
- Fran Cathcart – pre-mix editing for track 6
- Mark Wilder – mastering

== Charts and certifications ==
=== Weekly charts ===
Chart (2013–15)	Peak position
Austrian Albums (Ö3 Austria)	25
Belgian Albums (Ultratop Flanders)	35
Belgian Albums (Ultratop Wallonia)	57
Danish Albums (Hitlisten)	7
Dutch Albums (Album Top 100)	6
French Albums (SNEP)	24
German Albums (Offizielle Top 100)	8
Italian Albums (FIMI)	42
Norwegian Albums (VG-lista)	35
Spanish Albums (PROMUSICAE)	89
Swiss Albums (Schweizer Hitparade)	63
UK Albums (OCC)	9
US Billboard 200	187
US Top Jazz Albums (Billboard)	2

=== Year-end charts ===
Chart (2013)	Position
German Albums (Offizielle Top 100)	50
US Top Jazz Albums (Billboard)	31

Chart (2014)	Position
French Albums (SNEP)	150
German Albums (Offizielle Top 100)	34
UK Albums (OCC)	60
US Top Jazz Albums (Billboard)	6

Chart (2015)	Position
UK Albums (OCC)	37

=== Certifications ===
Region	Certification	Certified units/sales
Austria (IFPI Austria)	Platinum	15,000^{*}
Germany (BVMI)	3× Gold	300,000^{‡}
Netherlands (NVPI)	Platinum	50,000^{‡}
United Kingdom (BPI)	Platinum	300,000^{‡}
^{*} Sales figures based on certification alone.^{‡} Sales+streaming figures based on certification alone.
