= Gregory Porter =

American singer and songwriter (born 1971)

- Porter at the 2026 Montreux Jazz Festival

Background information
- Born: November 4, 1971 (age 55); Sacramento, California, U.S.
- Origin: Bakersfield, California, U.S.
- Education: Highland High School
- Genres: Jazz; blues; soul; gospel
- Occupations: Singer; songwriter
- Instrument: Vocals
- Years active: 1998–present
- Labels: Motéma; Blue Note; Membran
- Website: gregoryporter.com

Signature
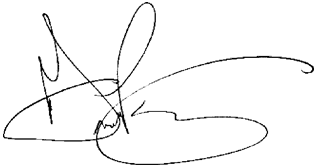

Gregory Porter (born November 4, 1971) is an American singer, songwriter, and musician. He has twice won the Grammy Award for Best Jazz Vocal Album: first in 2014 for Liquid Spirit and then again in 2017 for Take Me to the Alley.

== Early life and education ==
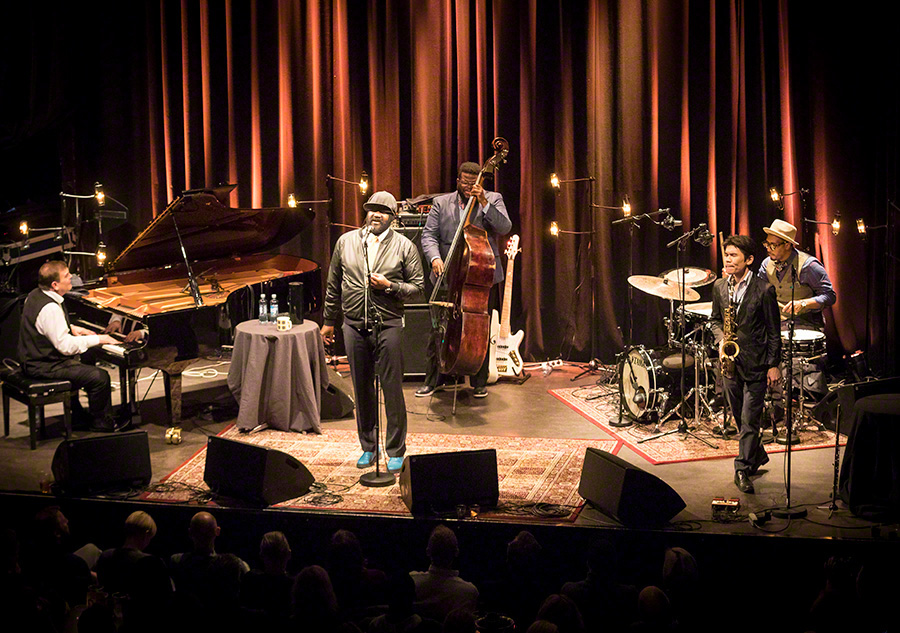
Porter in concert with his regular band at Cosmopolite club in Oslo, Norway, 2016

Gregory Porter was born in Sacramento, California, and was raised in Bakersfield, California, where his mother Ruth was a minister. Porter has seven siblings. His mother was a large influence on his life, having encouraged him to sing in church at an early age. His father, Rufus, was largely absent from his life. Says Porter, "Everybody had some issues with their father, even if he was in the house. He may have been emotionally absent. My father was just straight-up absent. I hung out with him just a few days in my life. And it wasn't a long time. He just didn't seem to be completely interested in being there. Maybe he was, I don't know."

After graduating from Highland High School in 1989, he received a full athletic scholarship as a football lineman from San Diego State University (SDSU Aztecs), but a shoulder injury during his junior year cut short his football career.

Porter's mother died from cancer when he was 21 years old. From her death bed, she told him to: "Sing, baby, sing!"

== Career ==
Porter moved to the Bedford-Stuyvesant section of Brooklyn in 2004, along with his brother Lloyd. He worked as a chef at Lloyd's restaurant, Bread-Stuy (now defunct), where he also performed. He performed at other neighborhood venues including Sista's Place and Solomon's Porch, and moved on to Harlem club St. Nick's Pub, where he maintained a weekly residency. Out of this residency evolved what would become Porter's touring band.

Porter released two albums on the Motéma label together with Membran Entertainment Group, 2010's Water and 2012's Be Good, before signing with Blue Note Records (under Universal Music Group) on May 17, 2013. His third album, Liquid Spirit, was released on September 2, 2013, in Europe and on September 17, 2013, in the US. The album, produced by Brian Bacchus, won the 2014 Grammy for Best Jazz Vocal Album. Liquid Spirit enjoyed commercial success rarely achieved by albums in the jazz genre, reaching the top 10 on the UK album charts. It was certified gold by the BPI, selling over 100,000 units in the UK.

In August 2014, Porter released "The 'In' Crowd" as a single. On May 9, 2015, Porter participated in VE Day 70: A Party to Remember, a televised commemorative concert from Horse Guards Parade in London, singing "As Time Goes By".

His fourth album, Take Me to the Alley, was released on May 6, 2016. In UK's The Guardian it was Alexis Petridis's album of the week.

On June 26, 2016, Porter performed on the Pyramid Stage at Glastonbury Festival 2016. Writing for The Daily Telegraph, Neil McCormick said, "The portly middle-aged jazzer may be the oddest pop star on the planet but he is a refreshing testament to the notion that the most important organ for musical appreciation should always be our ears. And Porter has one of the most easy-on-the-ear voices in popular music, a creamy baritone that flows thick and smooth across a rich gateaux of juicy melody. It's a voice that makes you want to lick your lips and dive right in."

In September 2016, Porter performed at Radio 2 Live in Hyde Park from Hyde Park, London. He would go on to perform in the annual BBC Children in Need show in November, a night dedicated to Sir Terry Wogan, who hosted it in previous years and was a fan of Porter.

In January 2017, Porter performed the song "Holding On" on BBC One's The Graham Norton Show. In September 2017, he performed as part of the Later... with Jools Holland: Later 25 concert at the Royal Albert Hall. In October 2017, he performed the song "Mona Lisa", with Jeff Goldblum on piano, on The Graham Norton Show.

On August 28, 2020, Porter released his sixth studio album, All Rise. On November 5, 2021, Porter released a greatest hits compilation album titled Still Rising - The Collection on the Blue Note label. The same day he performed the song "Revival" on The Graham Norton Show.

On New Year's Eve 2021, Porter performed on Jools' Annual Hootenanny.

On May 12, 2021, Porter launched his cooking show, The PorterHouse with Gregory Porter, which was presented by Citi and aired 6 episodes.

On June 2, 2022, Porter, accompanied by the London Community Gospel Choir, sang the specially-composed song "A Life Lived with Grace" for the lighting of The Queen's Platinum Jubilee Beacons. On September 14, 2023, Porter released the single "Somebody", in collaboration with TSHA and Ellie Goulding.

On November 3, 2023, Porter released his seventh studio album, Christmas Wish, on the Decca and Blue Note labels.

On December 13, 2023, Porter performed at the Royal Albert Hall in its "Christmas at The Royal Albert Hall" programme.

In September 2024, Porter announced a 12-night tour of the UK, commencing in April 2025, including a night at Manchester's new Co-op Live arena.

In 2025, Porter participated in the sixth season of The Masked Singer UK as "Dressed Crab", where he finished in second place.

== Style ==
Describing his own style, Porter said in a 2014 interview that "I would say Donny Hathaway, Nat King Cole, Bill Withers – I hear something of me in all of them that is similar to the culture that I grew up in i.e. Gospel music. I could hear the familiarity to Gospel music in the songs of someone like Ray Charles; just voices that influence my soul and are rooted in Gospel music."

== Critical reception ==
Since his 2010 debut on the Motéma label, Porter has been well received in the music press.

His debut album, Water, was nominated for Best Jazz Vocal album at the 53rd Annual Grammy Awards. He was also a member of the original Broadway cast of It Ain't Nothin' But the Blues. His second album, Be Good, which contains many of Porter's compositions, garnered critical acclaim for both his distinctive singing and his compositions, such as "Be Good (Lion's Song)", "Real Good Hands", and "On My Way to Harlem". "Real Good Hands" was also nominated for Best Traditional R&B Performance at the 55th Annual Grammy Awards. In his review of Water, the BBC's Kevin Le Gendre wrote that "Gregory Porter has a voice and musicality to be reckoned with."

The New York Times described Porter as "a jazz singer of thrilling presence, a booming baritone with a gift for earthy refinement and soaring uplift" in its review of Liquid Spirit.

Michael G. Nastos of AllMusic wrote a mixed review of Water, stating: "In hard bop trim, Shorter's 'Black Nile' has Porter shouting out a lyric line that was done many years ago by Chicago's Luba Raashiek, but Porter's voice is strained and breaks up. While on every track Porter sings with great conviction, he's more effective on lower-key compositions", but went on to say that "he's right up there with José James as the next big male vocal jazz star."

== Personal life ==
Porter is married to Victoria and they have two sons. Their home is in Bakersfield, California. His brother Lloyd died in May 2020 due to complications from COVID-19.

For public appearances, Porter always wears a hat reminiscent of a newsboy cap incorporating fabric that covers his ears and chin. In a 2012 interview with Jazzweekly.com, when asked: "What's with the weird and wonderful hat?" Porter replied: "I've had some surgery on my skin, so this has been my look for a little while and will continue to be for a while longer. People recognize me by it now. It is what it is." In an interview with The Daily Telegraph in 2016, he divulged that he received some facial scars when he was "seven or eight", but declined to go into the specifics of how they were sustained. He said: "I just saw it one day (the hat) and said 'I'm gonna put this on, I like it.' It was before the music career." The cap is a Kangol Summer Spitfire.

== Discography ==
=== Studio albums ===
- Water (2010)
- Be Good (2012)
- Liquid Spirit (2013)
- Take Me to the Alley (2016)
- Nat King Cole & Me (2017)
- All Rise (2020)
- Christmas Wish (2023)

== Awards and nominations ==
=== Grammy Awards ===
Year	Category	Nominated work	Result	Ref
2010	Best Jazz Vocal Album	Water	Nominated	
2012	Best Traditional R&B Performance	"Real Good Hands"	Nominated	
2013	Best Traditional R&B Performance	"Hey Laura"	Nominated	
2013	Best Jazz Vocal Album	Liquid Spirit	Won	
2016	Best Jazz Vocal Album	Take Me to the Alley	Won	
2018	Best Traditional Pop Vocal Album	Nat King Cole & Me	Nominated	
2020	Best R&B Album	All Rise	Nominated	
2025	Best Traditional Pop Vocal Album	Christmas Wish	Nominated	

=== Edison Awards ===
Edison Oeuvre Award 2025
